= Battle of Iwo Jima =

Major World War II battle in the Pacific Theater

- Part of the Volcano and Ryukyu Islands campaign of the Pacific Theater (World War II)
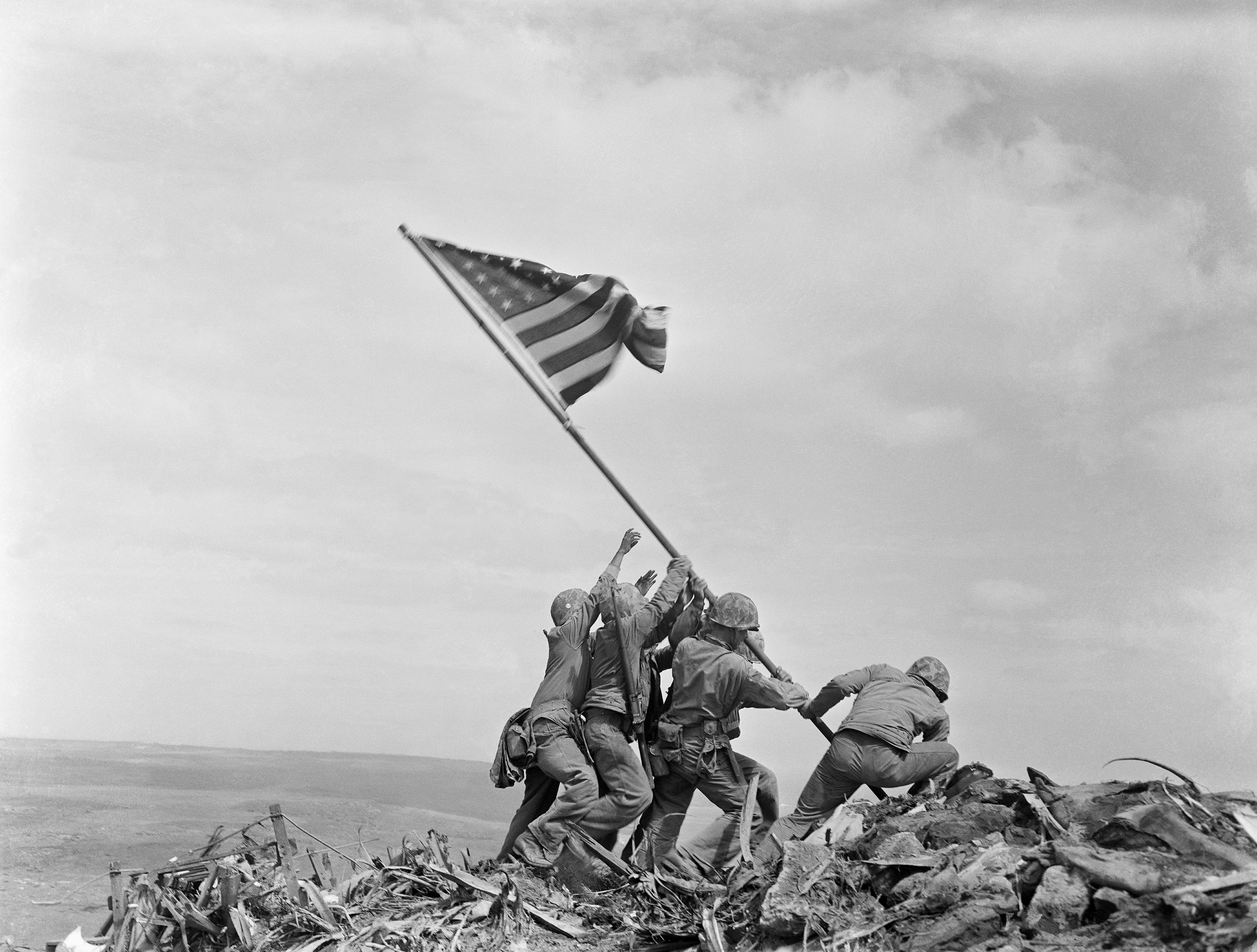
- Raising the Flag on Iwo Jima, taken on Mount Suribachi
Date	19 February – 26 March 1945 (5 weeks)
Location	Iwo Jima, Volcano Islands, Japan 24.78°N 141.32°E
Result	American victory

Belligerents
United States	Japan

Commanders and leaders
Raymond A. Spruance; Marc Mitscher; William H. P. Blandy; Holland M. Smith; Harry Schmidt; Graves B. Erskine	Tadamichi Kuribayashi (PKIA); Takeichi Nishi (PKIA)

Units involved
V Amphibious Corps; 147th Infantry Regiment (separate); Seventh Air Force; U.S. 5th Fleet	109th Infantry Division; Naval ground troops

Strength
110,000 (all branches); 500+ ships	20,933; (13,586 Army, 7,347 Navy)

Casualties and losses
Main battle phase: 6,821 dead 19,217 wounded 2 captured 2,648 fatigued 44 tanks destroyed (Note: 137 tanks damaged or destroyed.); 28,698 total Post-battle phase: 15 killed 144 wounded	Main battle phase: 17,845–18,375 KIA/MIA; 216 prisoners Post-battle phase: 867 prisoners remainder killed, died, or dispersed (Note: Many of which would succumb to their wounds, die of disease, or surrender at a later date. The last group of Japanese soldiers to surrender on Iwo Jima did so in 1949.)

The Battle of Iwo Jima (硫黄島の戦い, Iōtō no Tatakai,or Iōjima no Tatakai; 19 February – 26 March 1945) was a major battle in which the United States Marine Corps (USMC), United States Navy (USN), and United States Army (USA) landed on and eventually captured the island of Iwo Jima from the Imperial Japanese Army (IJA) during World War II. The American invasion, designated Operation Detachment, had the goal of capturing the island with its two airfields: South Field and Central Field.

The Japanese Army positions on the island were heavily fortified, with a dense network of bunkers, hidden artillery positions, and 18 km (11 mi) of tunnels. (Note: "... the defenders of Iwo literally developed [the improvement of natural caves] into a science. Because of the importance of the underground positions, 25 percent of the garrison was detailed to tunneling. Positions constructed underground ranged in size from small caves for a few men to several underground chambers capable of holding 300 or 400 men. In order to prevent personnel from becoming trapped in any one excavation, the subterranean installations were provided with multiple entrances and exits, as well as stairways and interconnecting passageways. ... the northern slope of Mount Suribachi alone harbored several thousand yards of tunnels. By the time the Marines landed on Iwo Jima, more than 11 miles of tunnels had been completed.") American ground forces were supported by extensive naval artillery, and enjoyed complete air supremacy provided by US Navy, Army, and Marine Corps aviators throughout. The five-week battle saw some of the fiercest and bloodiest fighting of the Pacific War.

Unique among Pacific War battles involving amphibious island landings, total American casualties exceeded those of the Japanese, with a ratio of three American casualties for every two Japanese. Of the 21,000 Japanese soldiers on Iwo Jima at the beginning of the battle, only 216 were taken prisoner, some only captured because they had been knocked unconscious or otherwise disabled. (Note: Burrell writes about how many historians have overestimated the number of Japanese casualties, with 20,000 and even 25,000 listed. Burrell puts the range between 18,060 and 18,600, with exactly 216 of these taken prisoner during the course of the battle. Another 867 prisoners were taken by the U.S. Army between April and June, after the Marines had left.) Most Japanese were killed in action, but 3,000 or more continued to resist within various cave systems on the island after most major fighting ended, until they were hunted down and killed by the US Army, with some eventually surrendering.

The invasion of Iwo Jima was controversial, with retired Chief of Naval Operations William V. Pratt stating that the island was useless to the Army as a staging base and useless to the Navy as a fleet base. The island's airfield did support P-51 Mustang long-range escort fighters to protect B-29 Superfortress bombers en route to Japan, and also for emergency landings of B-29s, although these were of limited value late in the war. The Japanese continued to maintain early-warning radar capabilities on the island of Rota, which was never invaded by American forces. Experiences with previous Pacific island battles suggested that the island would be well-defended and that seizing it would result in significant casualties. Lessons learned on Iwo Jima served as guidelines for American forces in the Battle of Okinawa two months later and the planned invasion of the Japanese homeland.

Joe Rosenthal's Associated Press photograph of the raising of the U.S. flag at the summit of the 169 m (554 ft) Mount Suribachi by six Marines became a famous image of the battle and the American war in the Pacific.

== Background ==
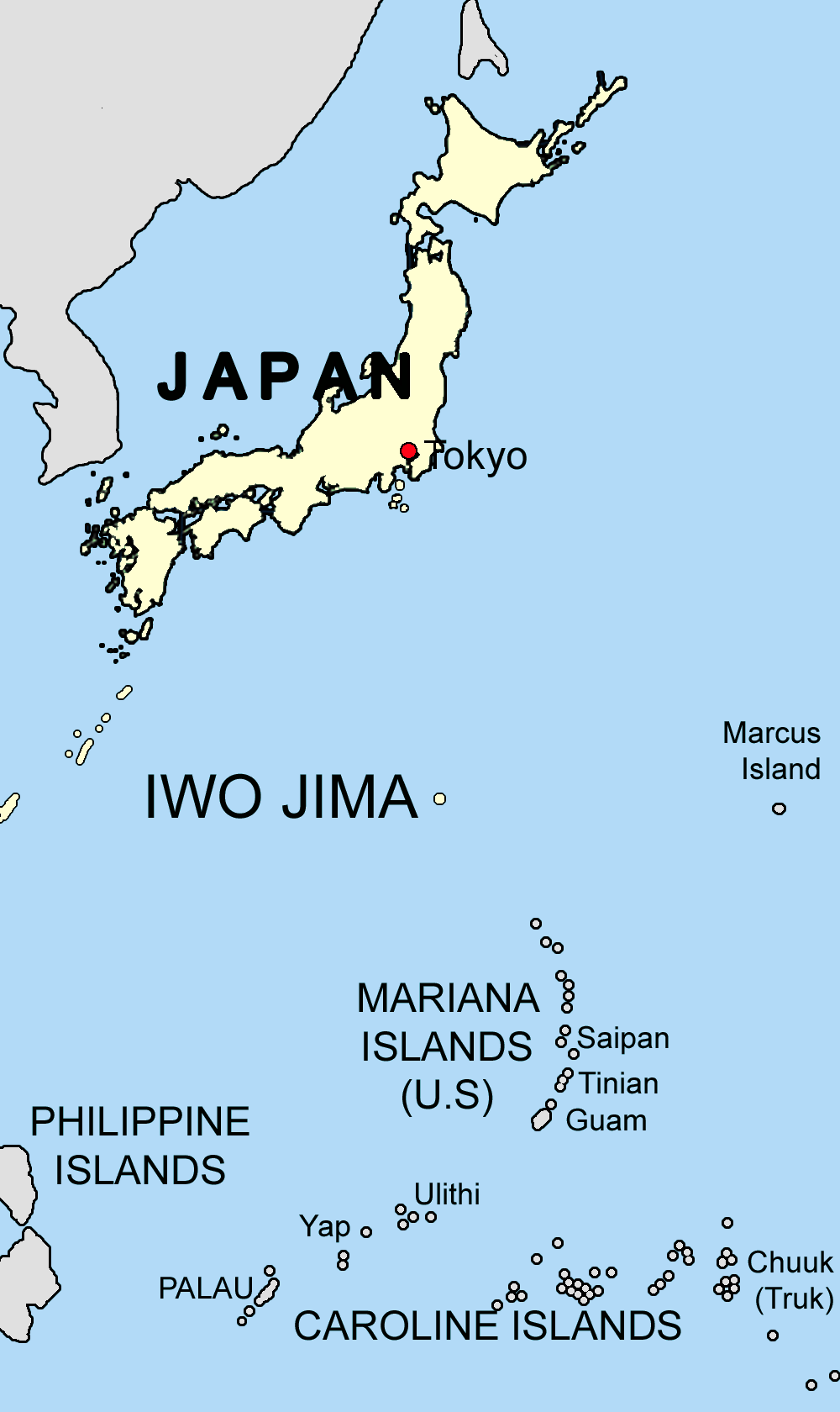
Location of Iwo Jima

After the American capture of the Marshall Islands and the air attacks against the Japanese fortress island of Truk Atoll in the Carolines in January 1944, Japanese military leaders reevaluated their strategic position. All indications pointed to an American drive toward the Mariana Islands and the Carolines. To counter such an offensive, the IJA and the Imperial Japanese Navy (IJN) established an inner line of defenses extending generally northward from the Carolines to the Marianas, from there to Japan via the Volcano Islands, and westward from the Marianas via the Carolines and the Palau Islands to the Philippines.

In March 1944, the Japanese 31st Army, commanded by General Hideyoshi Obata, was activated to garrison this inner line. (Note that an army-sized unit in Imperial Japanese military doctrine was about the size of an American, British Army, or Canadian Army corps.)

The commander of the Japanese garrison on Chichi Jima was placed nominally in command of IJA and IJN units in the Volcano Islands. After the American conquest of the Marianas, daily bomber raids from the Marianas began to strike mainland Japan in Operation Scavenger. Iwo Jima served as an early warning station that radioed reports of incoming bombers back to the home islands, allowing Japanese air defenses to prepare for the arrival of American bombers.

After the U.S. seized bases in the Marshall Islands in the battles of Kwajalein and Eniwetok in February 1944, Japanese reinforcements were sent to Iwo Jima: 500 men from the naval base at Yokosuka and 500 from Chichi Jima reached Iwo Jima during March and April 1944. At the same time, with reinforcements arriving from Chichi Jima and the home islands, the army garrison on Iwo Jima reached a strength of more than 5,000 men. The loss of the Marianas during the summer of 1944 greatly increased the importance of the Volcano Islands for the Japanese, who were concerned that the loss of those islands would further facilitate American air raids against the home islands, disrupt war manufacturing, and severely damage civilian morale.

The final Japanese plans for the defense of the Volcano Islands were hamstrung by several factors:

1. The Combined Fleet had lost almost all of its striking power during naval engagements in the latter half of 1944, and could not interdict American landings.
2. Aircraft losses in 1944 had been so severe that even if war production was not affected by American air attacks, the combined Japanese air strength was not expected to increase to 3,000 warplanes until March or April 1945.
3. Those aircraft could not be used from bases in the home islands to support the defense of Iwo Jima because their range was not more than 900 km (560 mi).
4. Available warplanes had to be hoarded to defend Taiwan and the home islands.
5. There was a serious shortage of properly trained and experienced pilots because many pilots and aircrews died in battles over the Solomon Islands in 1942 and the Battle of the Philippine Sea in mid-1944.

In a postwar study, Japanese staff officers described the strategy used in the defense of Iwo Jima:

In the light of the above situation, seeing that it was impossible to conduct our air, sea, and ground operations on Iwo Island [Jima] toward ultimate victory, it was decided that to gain time necessary for the preparation of the Homeland defense, our forces should rely solely upon the established defensive equipment in that area, checking the enemy by delaying tactics. Even the suicidal attacks by small groups of our Army and Navy airplanes, the surprise attacks by our submarines, and the actions of parachute units, although effective, could be regarded only as a strategical ruse on our part. It was a most depressing thought that we had no available means left for the exploitation of the strategical opportunities which might from time to time occur in the course of these operations.

— Japanese Monograph No. 48

After the Battle of Leyte in the Philippines, the Allies were left with a two-month lull in their offensive operations before the planned invasion of Okinawa. Iwo Jima was considered strategically important since it provided an air base for Japanese fighter planes to intercept long-range B-29 Superfortress bombers flying to strike targets in Japan. In addition, it was used by the Japanese to stage intermittent air attacks on the Mariana Islands from November 1944 to January 1945. The capture of Iwo Jima would eliminate those problems. The island's airfield would also support P-51 Mustang fighters, which could escort and protect bombers en route to Japan.

American intelligence sources were confident that Iwo Jima would fall in one week. In light of optimistic intelligence reports, the decision was made to invade Iwo Jima, and the operation was codenamed Operation Detachment.

== Planning and preparation ==
=== Japanese preparations ===
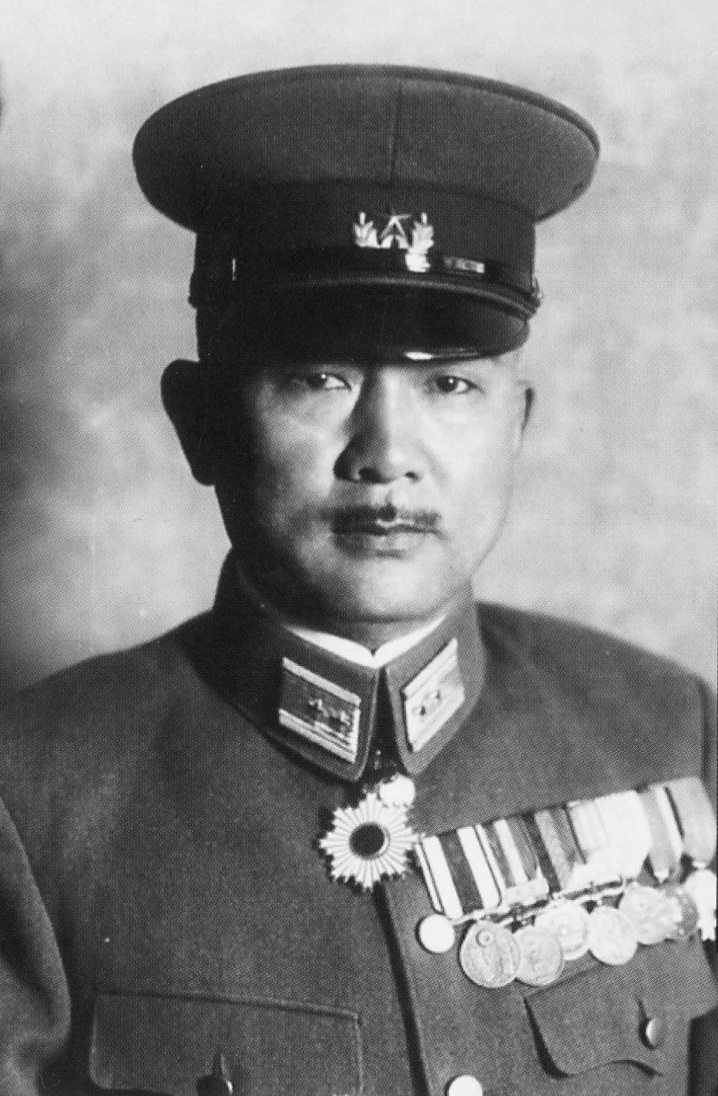
Lieutenant General Tadamichi Kuribayashi

In June 1944, Lieutenant General Tadamichi Kuribayashi was assigned to command the defense of Iwo Jima. Kuribayashi knew that if the Americans decided to land on Iwo Jima, his garrison could not win the battle, but he hoped to inflict massive casualties on the American forces so that the United States, and its Australian and British allies, might reconsider carrying out an invasion of the Japanese home islands.

Drawing inspiration from Japanese defensive tactics used in the Battle of Peleliu, Kuribayashi designed a defensive strategy that broke with traditional Japanese military doctrine. Rather than establishing defenses on the beach to contest the landings directly, he opted for defenses in depth. Kuribayashi's troops constructed a complex system of mutually-supporting fortifications, often linked by a vast tunnel system, equipped with heavy machine guns and artillery. Takeichi Nishi's armored tanks were camouflaged and used as static artillery positions. Because the tunnel linking Mount Suribachi to the rest of the island was never completed, Kuribayashi organized the southern area of the island in and around the mountain as a semi-independent sector, with his main defensive zone built up in the north. The expected American naval and air bombardment prompted the creation of an extensive network of tunnels connecting otherwise disparate fighting positions, so that a pillbox that had been cleared could be later reoccupied. This network of bunkers and pillboxes was designed for protracted resistance. For instance, the Nanpo Bunker (Southern Area Islands Naval Air HQ) east of Airfield Number 2, had enough food, water, and ammunition for the Japanese to hold out for three months. The bunker was 90 feet underground with tunnels running in various directions. Approximately five hundred 55-gallon drums filled with water, kerosene, and fuel oil for generators were stored inside the complex. Gasoline-powered generators allowed for radios and lighting to be operated underground.

By the time the Americans invaded on 19 February 1945, 18 km (11 mi) of a planned 27 km (17 mi) of tunnels had been dug. Besides the Nanpo Bunker, there were numerous other command centers and barracks 75 feet below ground. Tunnels allowed for troops to move undetected between defensive positions. Hundreds of hidden artillery and mortar positions were placed all over the island, and many areas extensively mined. Among the Japanese weapons were 320 mm spigot mortars and a variety of explosive rockets. Nonetheless, the Japanese supply situation was inadequate. Troops were supplied 60% of the ammunition normally considered sufficient for single engagement by one division, and food for no more than four months.

Numerous Japanese sniper nests and camouflaged machine gun positions were set up. Kuribayashi engineered the defenses so that every part of Iwo Jima was subject to Japanese defensive fire. He also received a handful of kamikaze pilots to use against the enemy fleet; their attacks during the battle killed 318 American sailors. However, against his wishes, Kuribayashi's superiors on Honshu ordered him to erect some beach defenses.

Starting on 15 June 1944, the U.S. Navy and the U.S. Army Air Forces began shore bombardment and air raids against Iwo Jima, which would become the longest and most intense preliminary bombardments in the Pacific Theater. They consisted of a combination of naval artillery attacks and aerial bombings, which would last for nine months. Unaware of Kuribayashi's tunnel defense system, some American planners assumed that most of the Japanese garrison had been killed by the constant bombing raids.

On 17 February 1945 the destroyer escort USS Blessman deployed Underwater Demolition Team 15 (UDT-15) onto Iwo Jima's Blue Beach for reconnaissance. They were spotted by Japanese infantry and fired upon, killing one American diver. On the evening of 18 February, Blessman was hit with a bomb by Japanese aircraft, killing 40 sailors, including 15 members of the UDT.

=== Pre-landing bombardment ===
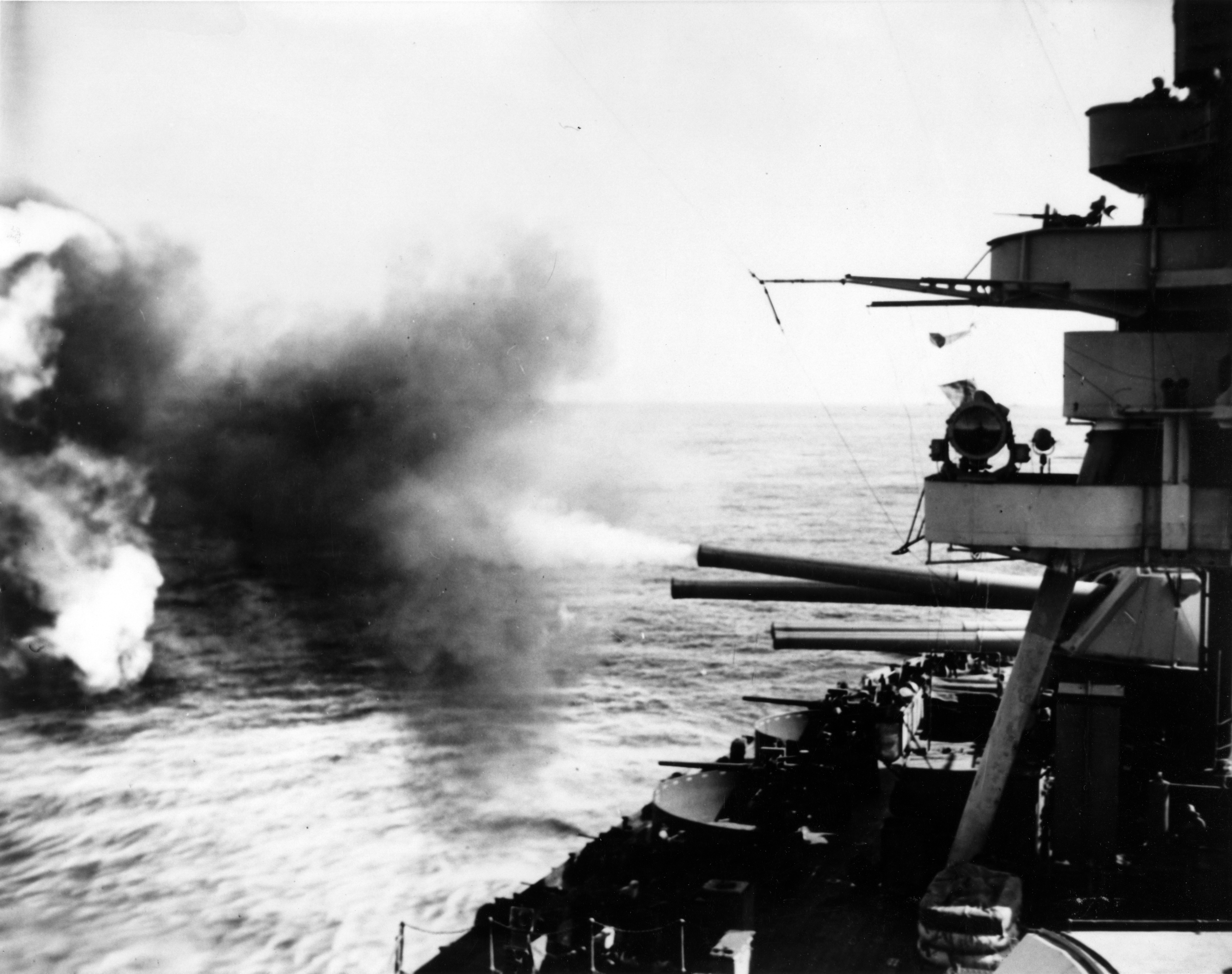
The battleship USS New York firing her 14 in (360 mm) main guns on the island, 16 February 1945 (D minus 3)

Major General Harry Schmidt, commander of the Marine landing force, requested a 10-day heavy bombardment of the island immediately preceding his planned amphibious assault. However, Rear Admiral William H. P. Blandy, commander of the Amphibious Support Force (Task Force 52), believed that such a bombardment would not allow him time to replenish his ships' ammunition before the landings; he thus refused Schmidt's request. Schmidt then asked for nine days of shelling; Blandy again refused and insisted upon a three-day bombardment. This decision was resented among the Marines in the landing force. After the war, Lieutenant General Holland M. "Howlin' Mad" Smith, commander of the Expeditionary Troops (Task Force 56, which consisted of Schmidt's Fifth Amphibious Corps), bitterly complained that a frequent lack of supporting naval gunfire had cost Marine lives throughout the Allied island-hopping campaign.

Each heavy warship was assigned an area on Iwo Jima to saturate with shells, ultimately covering the entire island. Each warship fired for approximately six hours before stopping for a certain amount of time. Poor weather on D-3 (three days before the landings) led to uncertain results for that day's bombardment. On D-2, the time and care that the Japanese had taken in preparing their artillery positions became clear. When heavy cruiser USS Pensacola got within range of Japanese shore batteries, the ship was quickly hit six times and suffered 17 dead. Later, 12 small craft attempting to land a UDT were all struck by Japanese fire and quickly retired. While aiding these vessels, the destroyer USS Leutze was also hit and suffered seven dead. On D-1, Blandy's gunners were once again hampered by rain and clouds. Schmidt summed up his feelings by stating, "We only got about 13 hours worth of fire support during the 34 hours of available daylight."

The limited bombardment had a questionable impact on the enemy since the Japanese were heavily dug-in and well fortified. The craters left behind by the barrage also provided additional cover for the defenders, while hampering the attackers' advance. Despite this, many bunkers and caves were destroyed during the bombardment. The Japanese had been preparing for this battle since March 1944, which gave them a significant advantage. By the time of the landing, about 450 American ships were located off Iwo Jima, and the battle ultimately involved about 60,000 U.S. Marines and several thousand U.S. Navy Seabees.

== Opposing forces ==
Naval commanders for Operation Detachment

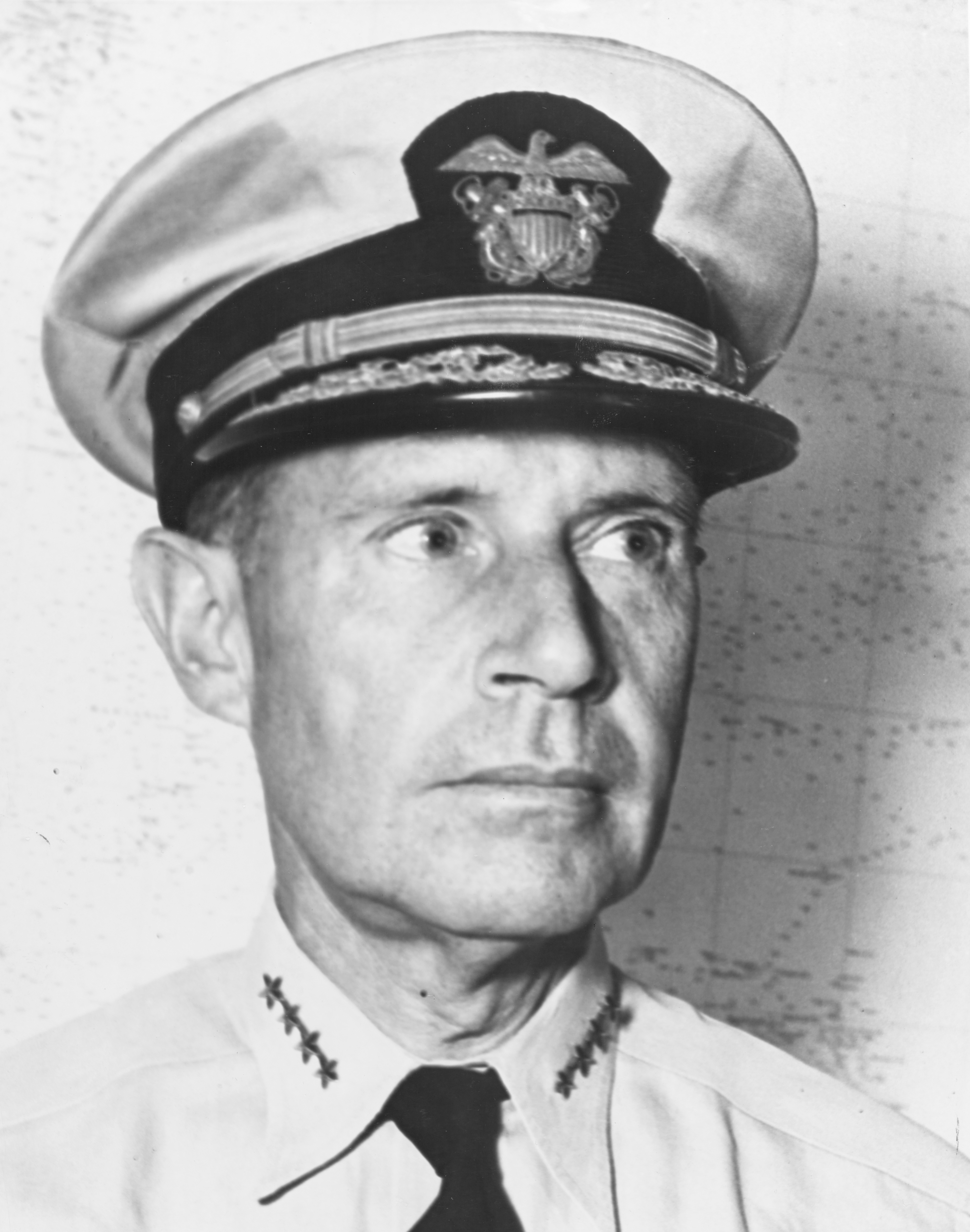
Admiral Raymond A. Spruance

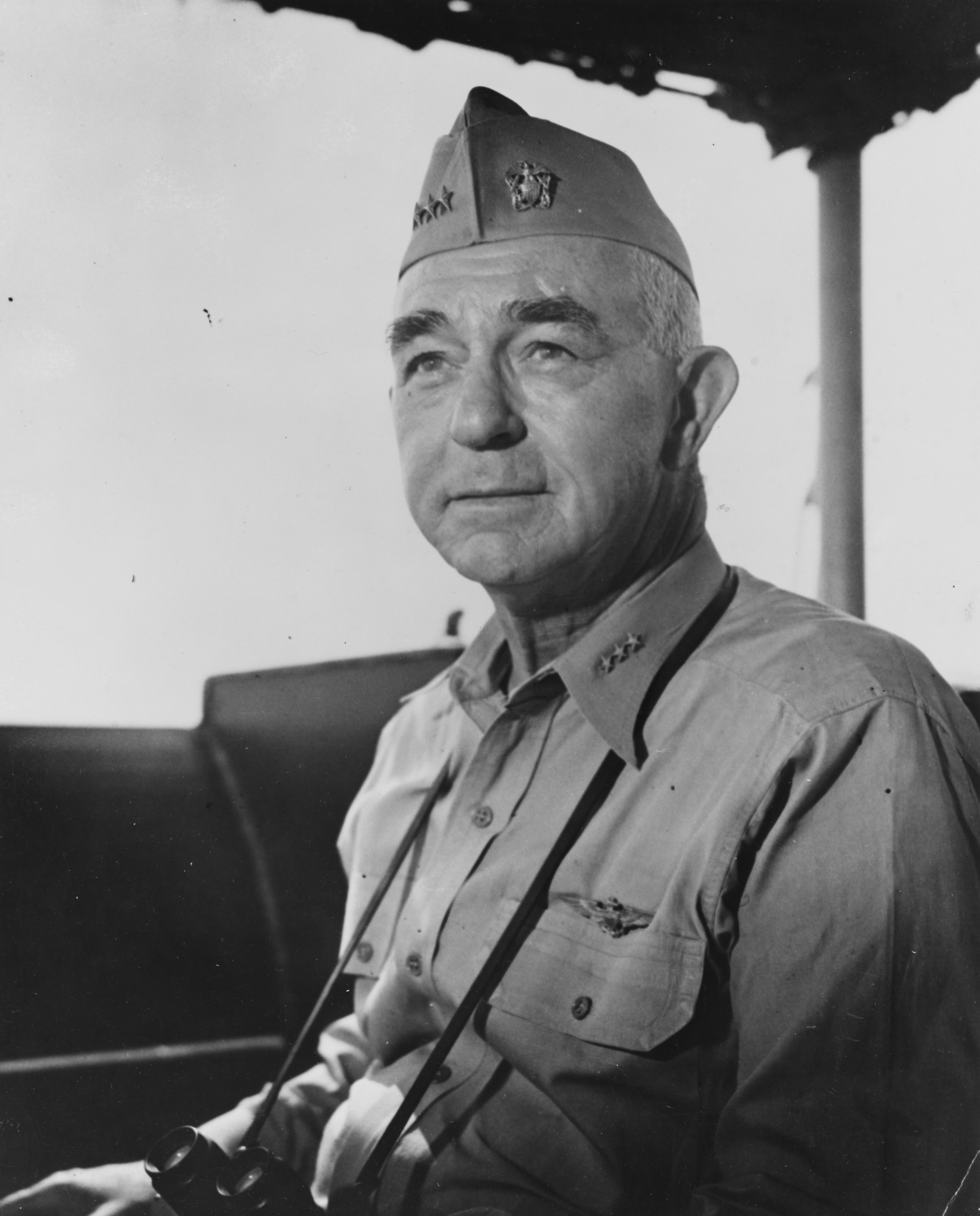
Vice Admiral Richmond Kelly Turner

Ground force commanders

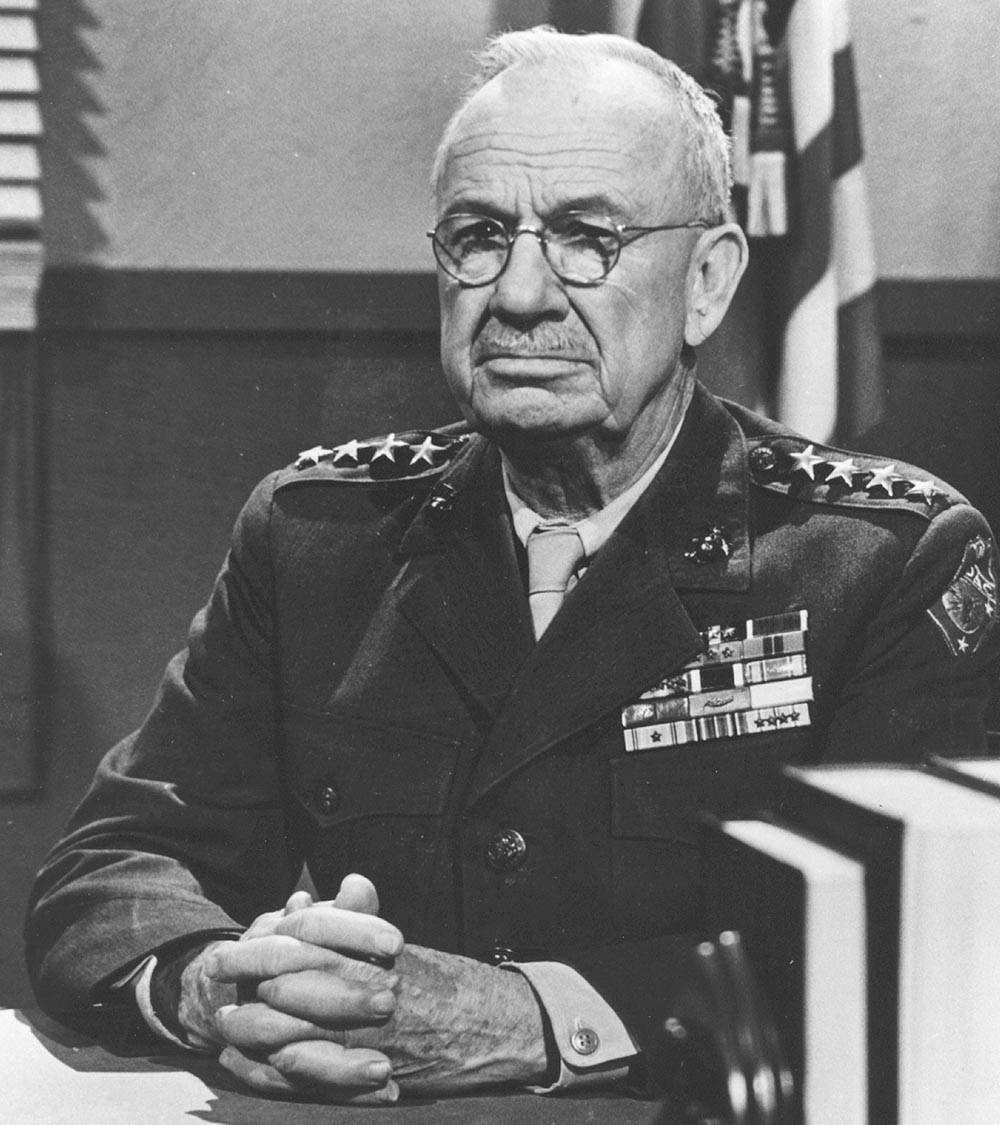
Lieutenant General Holland M. Smith

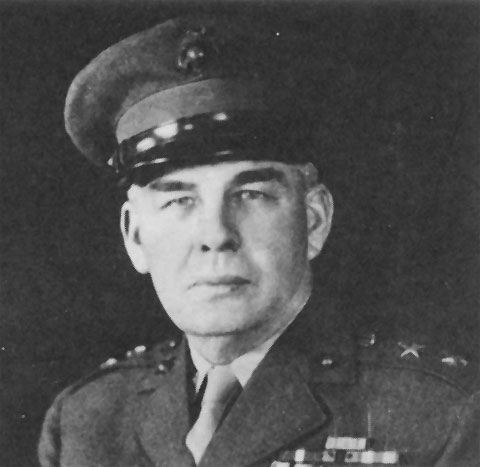
Major General Harry Schmidt

Marine division commanders on Iwo Jima

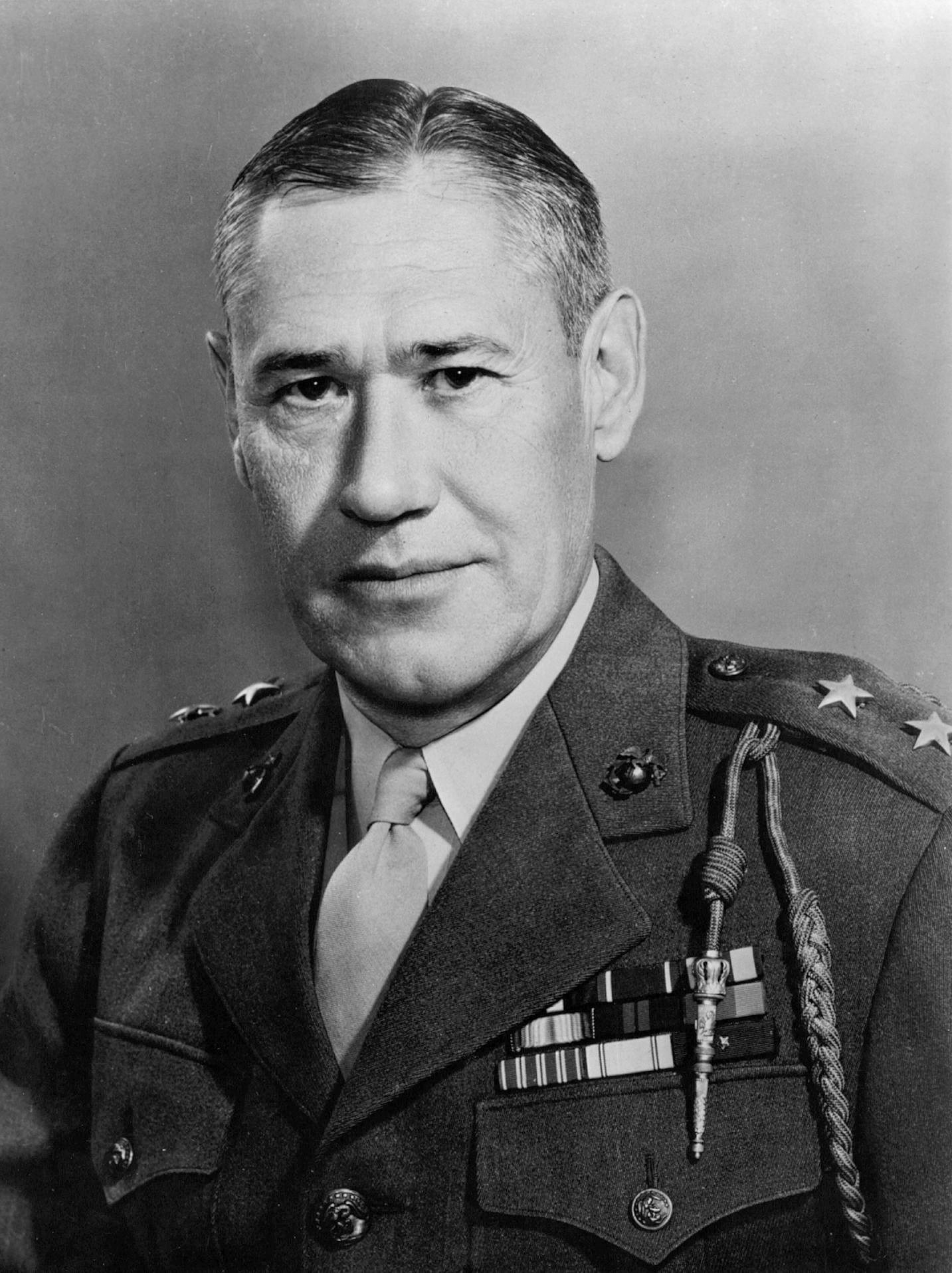
Major General Keller Rockey

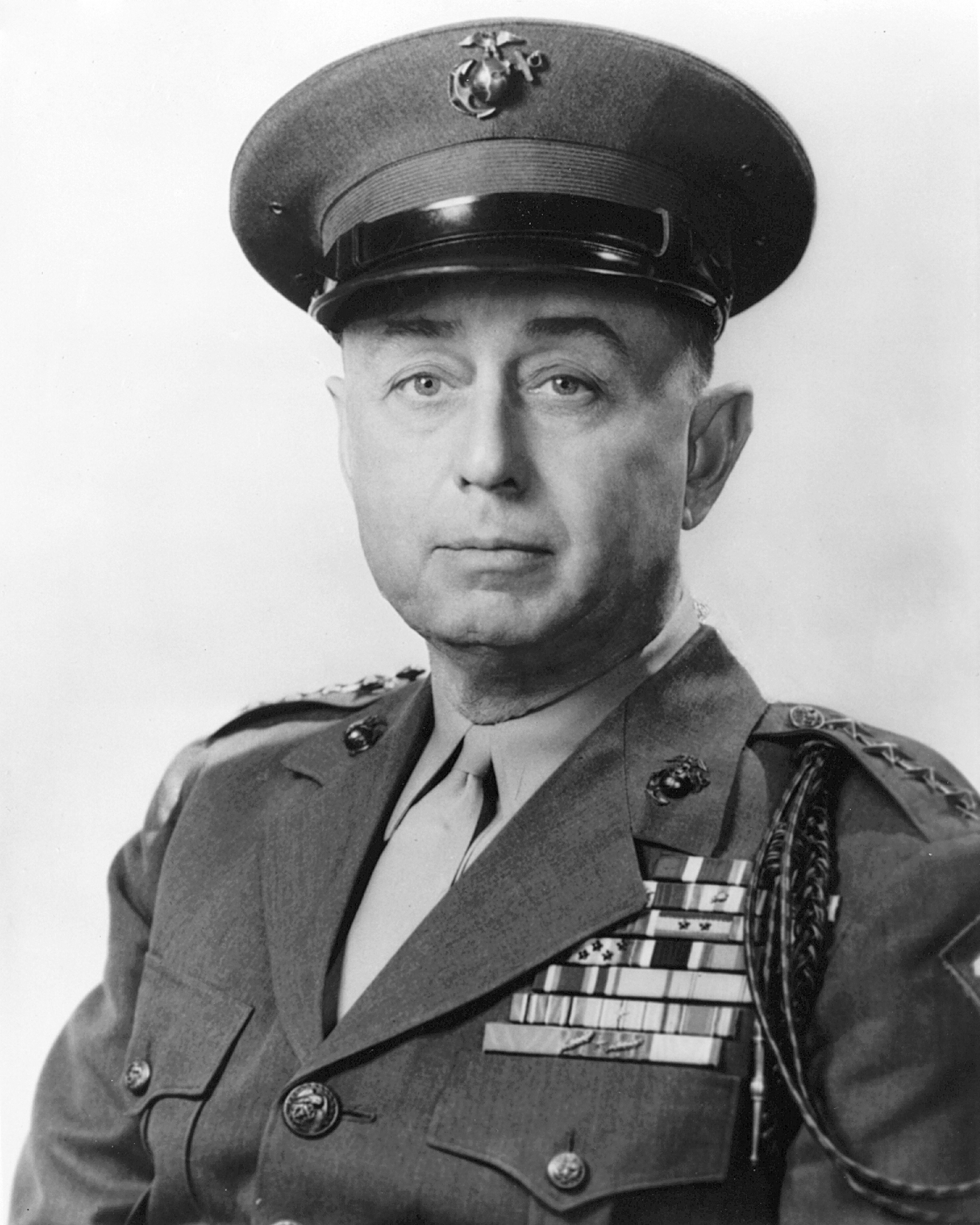
Major General Clifton Cates

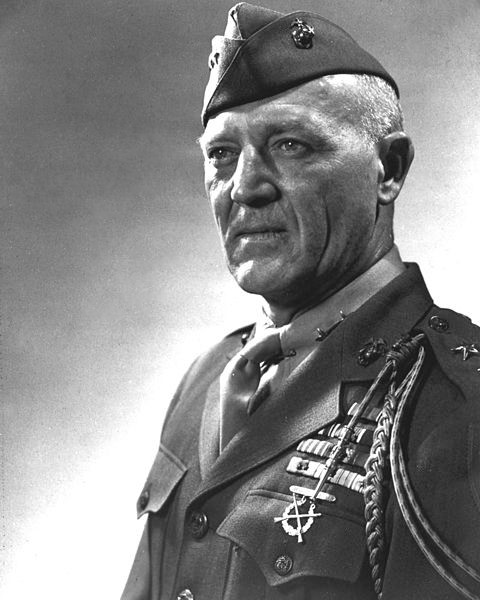
Major General Graves Erskine

=== American ===
- United States Fifth Fleet
- Admiral Raymond A. Spruance in heavy cruiser Indianapolis
  - Joint Expeditionary Force (Task Force 51)
    - Vice Admiral Richmond Kelly Turner in amphibious command ship Eldorado
  - Expeditionary Troops (Task Force 56)
    - Lieutenant General Holland M. Smith, USMC
- V Amphibious Corps
- Major General Harry Schmidt, USMC
  - Southern sector (Green and Red beaches):
    - 5th Marine Division (25,884 officers and enlisted)
    - Major General Keller E. Rockey
      - 26th Marine Regiment (Colonel Chester B. Graham)
      - 27th Marine Regiment (Colonel Thomas A. Wornham)
      - 28th Marine Regiment (Colonel Harry B. Liversedge)
      - 13th Marine Regiment (Artillery) (Colonel James D. Waller)
  - Northern sector (Yellow and Blue beaches):
    - 4th Marine Division (24,452 officers and enlisted)
    - Major General Clifton B. Cates (Note: Served as Commandant of the Marine Corps from 1948 to 1951.)
      - 23rd Marine Regiment (Colonel Walter W. Wensinger)
      - 24th Marine Regiment (Colonel Walter I. Jordan)
      - 25th Marine Regiment (Colonel John R. Lanigan)
      - 14th Marine Regiment (Artillery) (Colonel Louis G. DeHaven)
  - Floating reserve:
    - 3rd Marine Division (19,597 officers and enlisted)
    - Major General Graves B. Erskine
      - 3rd Marine Regiment (Note: Did not land on Iwo Jima) (Colonel James A. Stuart)
      - 9th Marine Regiment (Colonel Howard N. Kenyon)
      - 21st Marine Regiment (Colonel Hartnoll J. Withers)
      - 12th Marine Regiment (Artillery) (Lieutenant Colonel Raymond F. Crist Jr.)
    - 147th Infantry Regiment (Ohio Army National Guard) (2,952 officers and enlisted)

=== Japanese ===
21,060 total men under arms
Lieutenant General Tadamichi Kuribayashi, commanding
Colonel Tadashi Takaishi, chief of staff

Army

Lieutenant General Tadamichi Kuribayashi
109th Infantry Division

Navy

Rear Admiral Rinosuke Ichimaru
4 anti-aircraft defense units

== First day – 19 February 1945 ==
=== Amphibious landing ===
During the night of 18 February 1945, Vice Admiral Marc Mitscher's large carrier force, Task Force 58, arrived off Iwo Jima. Also in this flotilla was Admiral Raymond A. Spruance, the overall commander for the invasion, in his flagship USS Indianapolis. Smith was once again deeply frustrated that Mitscher's powerful carrier group had been bombing the Japanese home islands instead of softening the defenses of Iwo Jima. Mitscher's fliers did, however, assist the additional surface vessel bombardment that accompanied the launch of the amphibious landing craft toward the island.

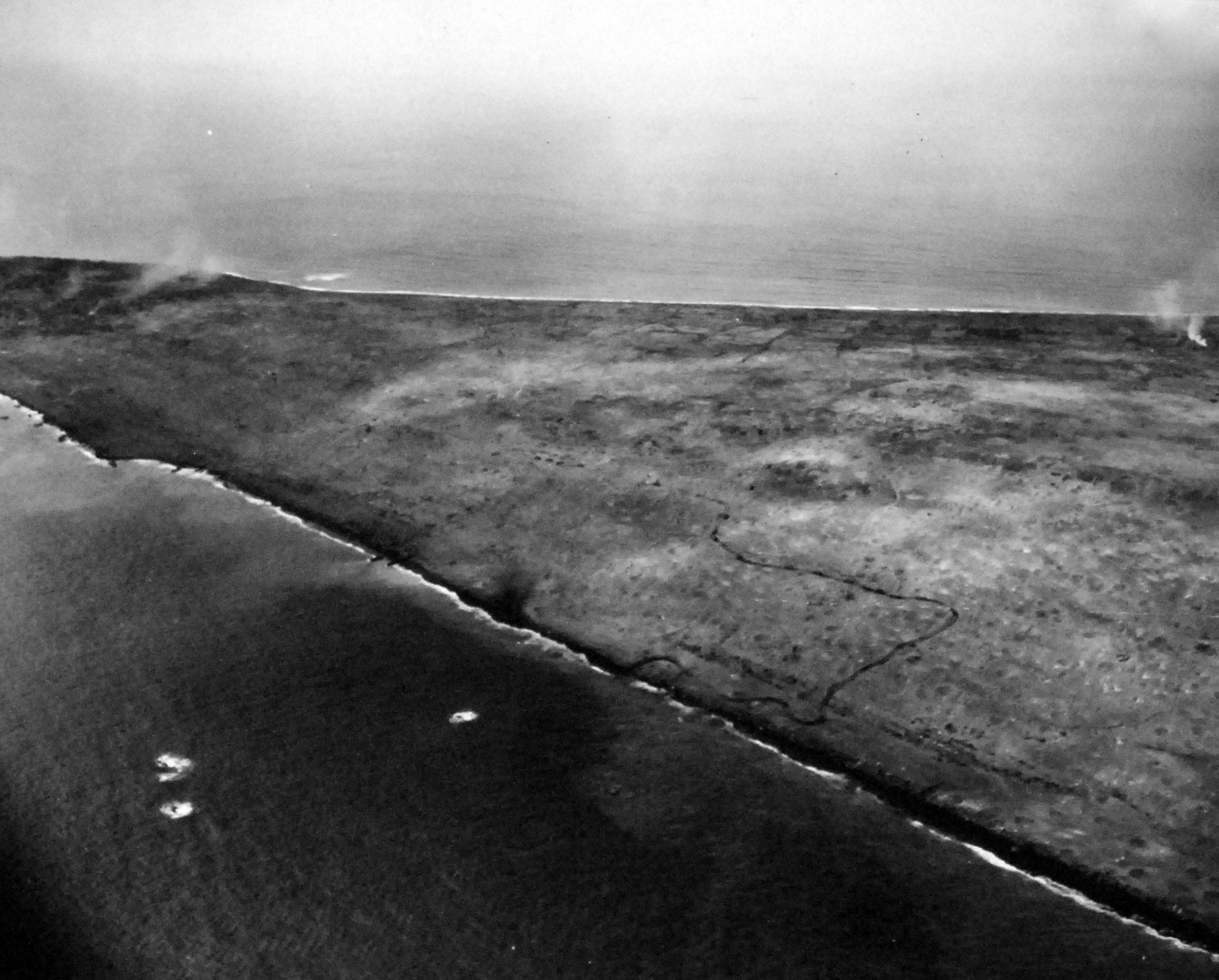
19 February 1945 air view of Marines landing on the beach

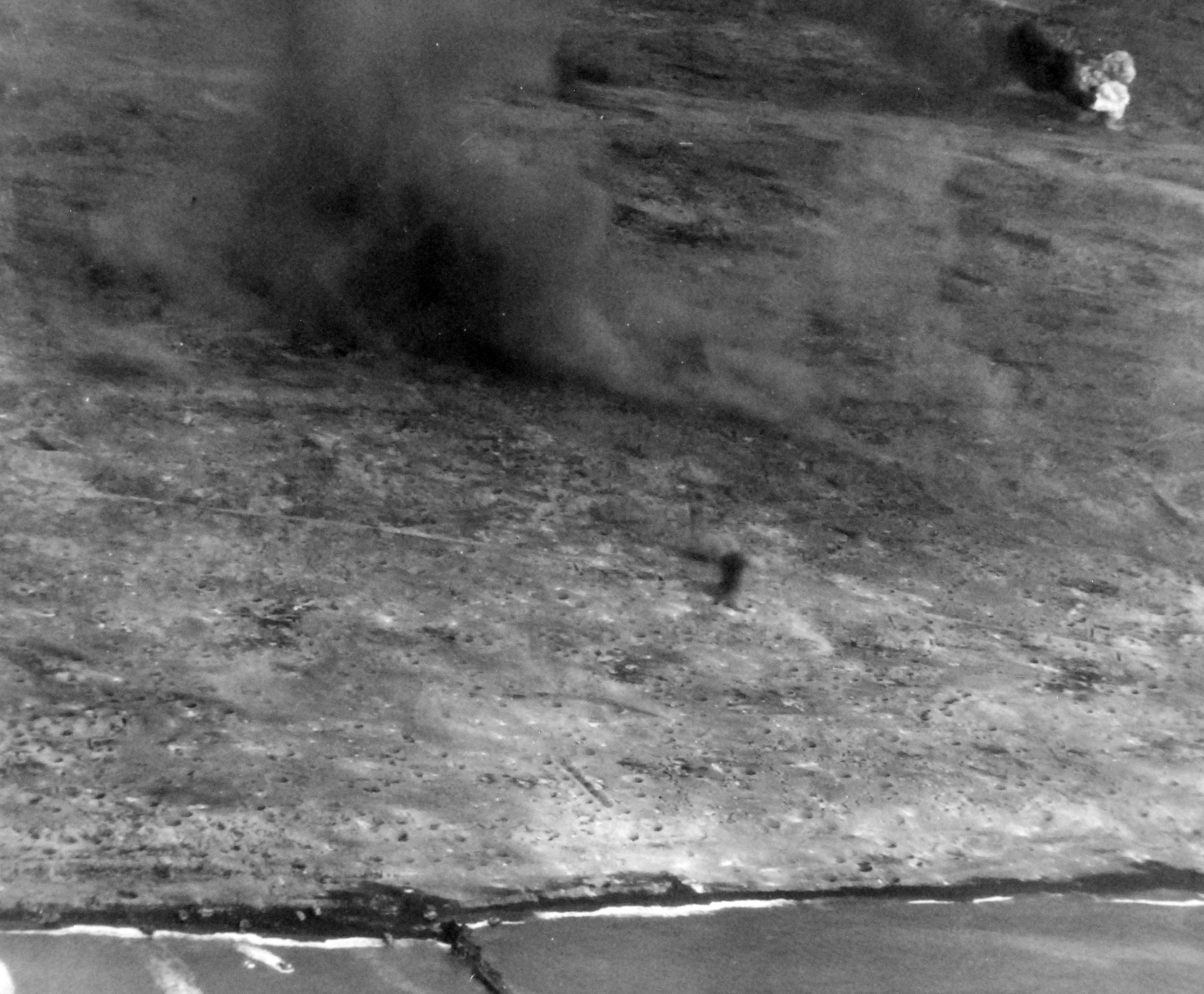
19 February 1945 air view of Marines landing on the beach

Unlike many days during the three-day preliminary bombardment, D-Day dawned clear and bright. At 08:59, one minute ahead of schedule, the first wave of Marines landed on the beaches of the southeastern coast of Iwo Jima. Under Major Howard Connor, 5th Marine Division signal officer, six Navajo code talkers worked around the clock during the first two days of the battle. These six men sent and received over 800 messages, all without error. Connor later stated, "Were it not for the Navajos, the Marines would never have taken Iwo Jima."

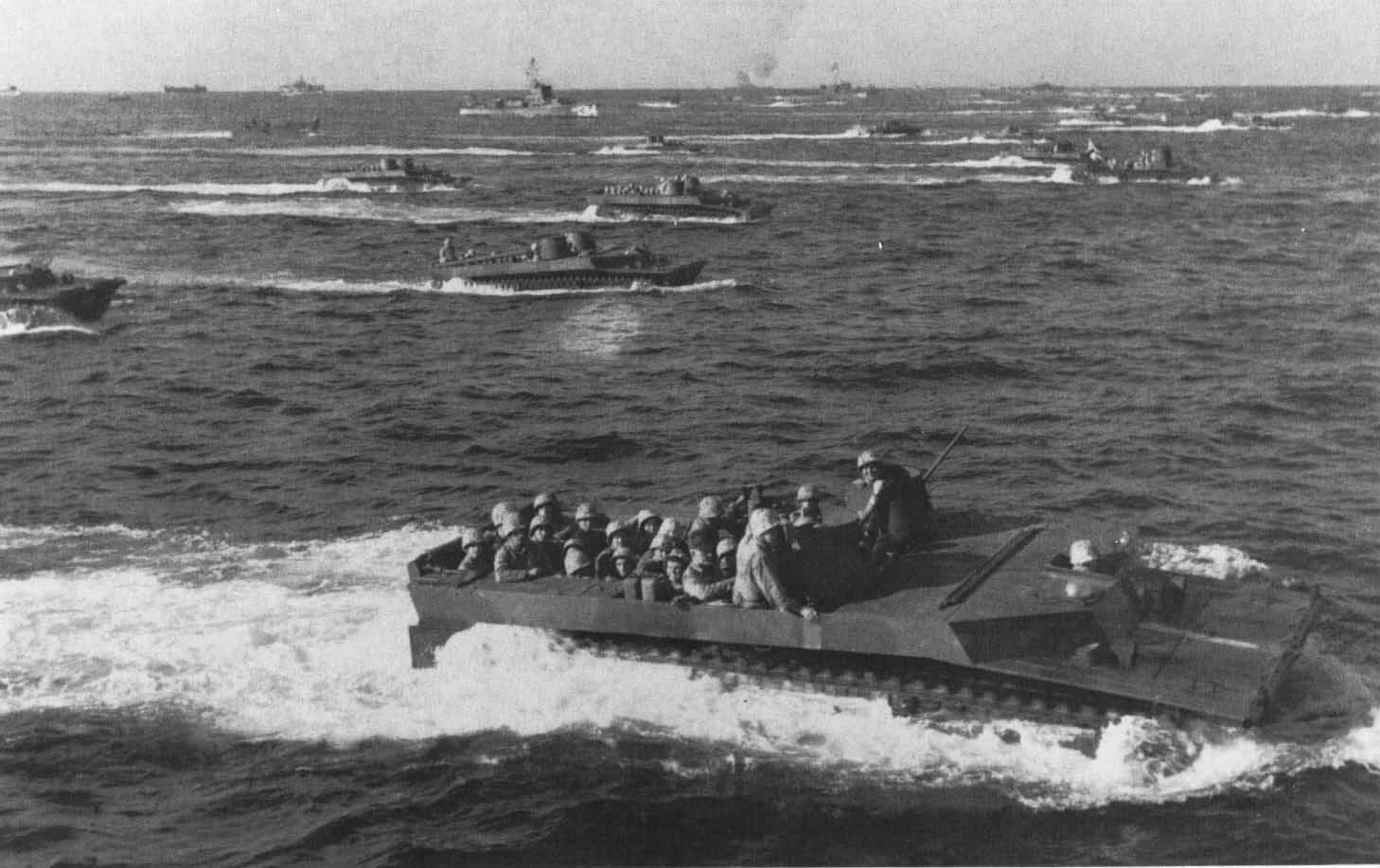
LVTs approach Iwo Jima

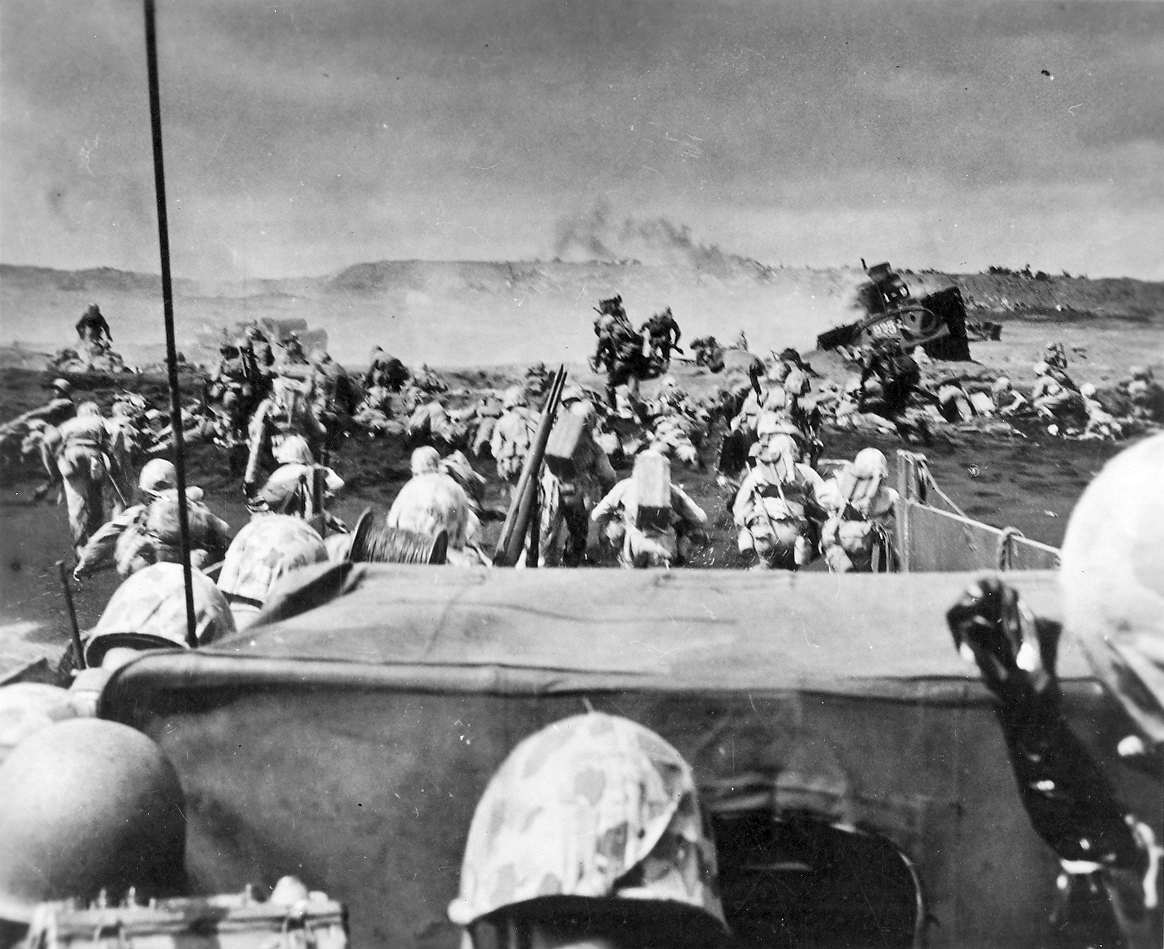
Marines landing on the beach

=== Situation on the beaches ===
Unfortunately for the landing force, the planners at Pearl Harbor severely misjudged the situation that would face Schmidt's Marines. The beaches had been described as "excellent," and the thrust inland expected to be "easy." The apparent lack of a vigorous Japanese response to the landings led the Navy to conclude that its bombardment had effectively suppressed the Japanese defenses. The Marines initially began deployment on the beach in good order, but the landings swiftly became congested due to the loose volcanic ash covering the island. After allowing the Americans to concentrate men and materiel on the beach for just over an hour, throughout which they maintained cohesive fire discipline, the Japanese opened fire. Shortly after 10:00 machine guns, mortars, and heavy artillery began to rain down on the crowded beach.

At first it came as a ragged rattle of machine-gun bullets, growing gradually louder and fiercer until at last all the pent-up fury of a hundred hurricanes seemed to be breaking upon the heads of the Americans. Shells screeched and crashed, every hummock spat automatic fire and the very soil underfoot erupted with hundreds of exploding land mines ... Marines walking erect crumpled and fell. Concussion lifted them and slammed them down, or tore them apart ...

Furthermore, after crossing the beach, the Marines were faced with 15 ft-high (4.6 m) slopes of soft black volcanic ash. This ash allowed for neither secure footing nor the construction of foxholes to protect the Marines from hostile fire. However, the ash did help to absorb some of the fragments from Japanese artillery.

Marines were trained to move rapidly forward; here they could only plod. The weight and amount of equipment was a terrific hindrance and various items were rapidly discarded. First to go was the gas mask ...

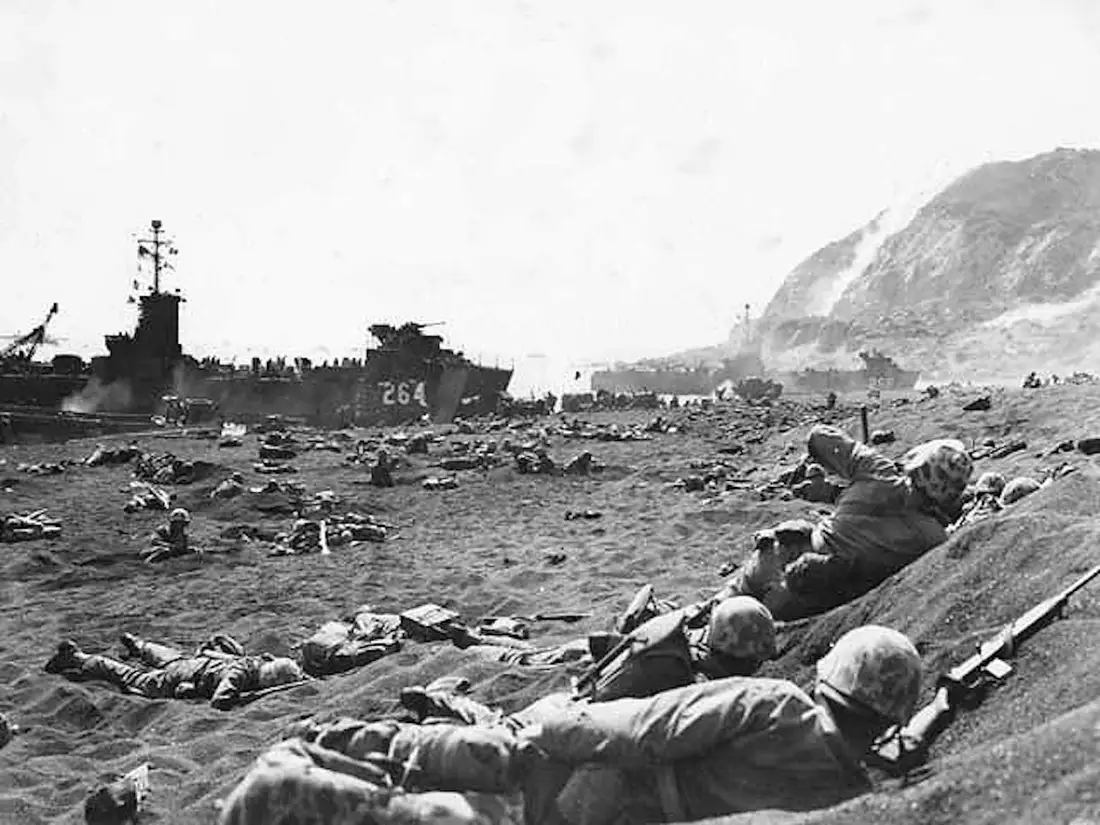
Members of the 1st Battalion 23rd Marines burrow in the volcanic sand on Yellow Beach 1. A beached LCI is visible upper left with Mount Suribachi upper right.

The Japanese crews manning the heavy artillery in Mount Suribachi opened reinforced steel doors shielding their positions in order to fire, and then closed them immediately afterward to prevent counterfire from the Marines and USN gunners. This made it exceedingly difficult for American units to destroy a Japanese artillery piece. To make matters worse for the Americans, most bunkers were connected to the elaborate tunnel system running through most of the island. Bunkers cleared with flamethrowers and grenades were often reoccupied shortly afterwards by Japanese troops moving underground. This tactic caused many casualties among the Marines, as they walked past reoccupied bunkers without expecting to suddenly take fresh fire from them.

Time-Life correspondent Robert Sherrod described the landing simply as "a nightmare in hell."

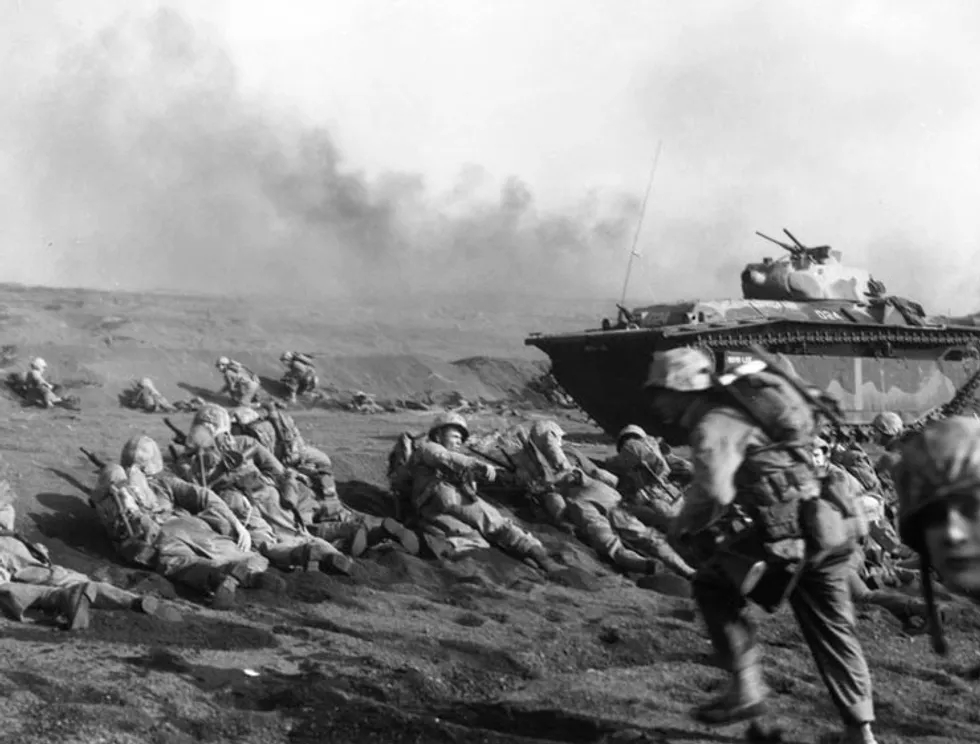
U.S. Marines of the Second Battalion, Twenty-Seventh Regiment, wait to move inland on Iwo Jima, soon after going ashore on 19 February 1945. An LVT(A)-5 amphibious tractor is in the background. Red Beach One.

=== Moving off the beaches ===
Amtracs, unable to gain traction in the black ash, made no progress up the slopes dominating the beach; their Marine passengers had to dismount and slog forward on foot. Men of Naval Construction Battalions 31 and 133, braving enemy fire, were eventually able to bulldoze roads off of the beach. This allowed the Marines to finally make some progress inland and get off the beach, which had become overcrowded with both men and materiel as follow-on waves of landing craft continued to unload. Casualties on the beach were heavy, with historian Derrick Wright noting "in virtually every shell hole there lay at least one dead Marine."

By 11:30, some Marines had managed to reach the southern tip of Airfield No. 1, the seizure of which had been one of the original objectives for the first day. They repelled a fanatical charge by over 100 Japanese troops and were able to keep their toehold on Airfield No. 1 as night fell.

=== Crossing the island ===
In the left-most sector of the landings, the Americans did manage to achieve one of their objectives for the battle that day. Led by Colonel Harry B. "Harry the Horse" Liversedge, the 28th Marines drove across the island at its narrowest width, around 800 m (870 yd), thereby isolating the Japanese dug in on Mount Suribachi.

=== Action on the right flank ===
The rightmost landing area was dominated by Japanese fortifications located at "the Quarry". The 25th Marine Regiment conducted a two-pronged attack to neutralize this position. 2nd Lieutenant Benjamin Roselle, part of a ground team directing naval gunfire, described the following experience:

Within a minute a mortar shell exploded among the group ... his left foot and ankle hung from his leg, held on by a ribbon of flesh ... Within minutes a second round landed near him and fragments tore into his other leg. For nearly an hour he wondered where the next shell would land. He was soon to find out as a shell burst almost on top of him, wounding him for the third time in the shoulder. Almost at once another explosion bounced him several feet into the air and hot shards ripped into both thighs ... as he lifted his arm to look at his watch a mortar shell exploded only feet away and blasted the watch from his wrist and tore a large jagged hole in his forearm: "I was beginning to know what it must be like to be crucified," he was later to say.

The 25th Marines' 3rd Battalion had landed approximately 900 men on the island that morning. Japanese resistance at the Quarry was so fierce that by nightfall, only 150 Marines were left in fighting condition, an 83.3% casualty rate.

By the evening of 19 February, 30,000 Marines had landed. About 40,000 more would follow. Aboard the command ship USS Eldorado, Smith saw the lengthy casualty reports and was briefed on the slow progress of the ground forces. To the war correspondents covering the operation, Smith remarked: "I don't know who he is, but the Japanese general running this show is one smart bastard."

== Subsequent combat ==
In the days after the landings, the Marines expected the usual Japanese banzai charge during the night. This had been the standard Japanese defense strategy in previous island battles against enemy ground forces in the Pacific, such as what the US Army faced in the Battle of Saipan in June 1944. In those attacks, for which the Army Soldiers had usually been at least somewhat prepared, the majority of Japanese attackers had been killed and the overall Japanese fighting strength significantly degraded. However, General Kuribayashi had strictly forbidden these "human wave" attacks, considering them a futile waste of resources.

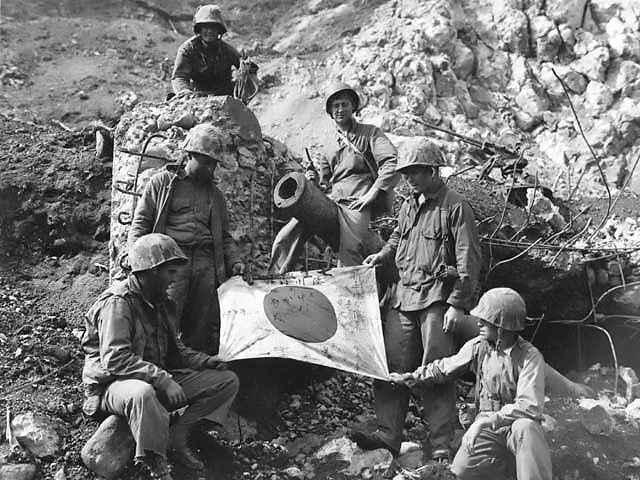
U.S. Marines pose with a captured Japanese flag on top of enemy pillbox.

The fighting near the beachhead remained intense, and the American advance was stalled by numerous defensive positions augmented by artillery. Marines were frequently ambushed by Japanese troops who sprang out of previously-unseen tunnels. At night, the Japanese left their defenses in small groups to attack American foxholes under cover of darkness, and USN ships began firing star shells to illuminate the battlefield. Similar to previous battles on Japanese-held islands, Japanese soldiers who knew English were used to harass and deceive Marine units. English-speaking IJA troops often yelled "corpsman", pretending to be a wounded Marine, in order to lure and kill the USN medical personnel attached to Marine infantry companies.

U.S. Marines raising the American flag over Iwo Jima

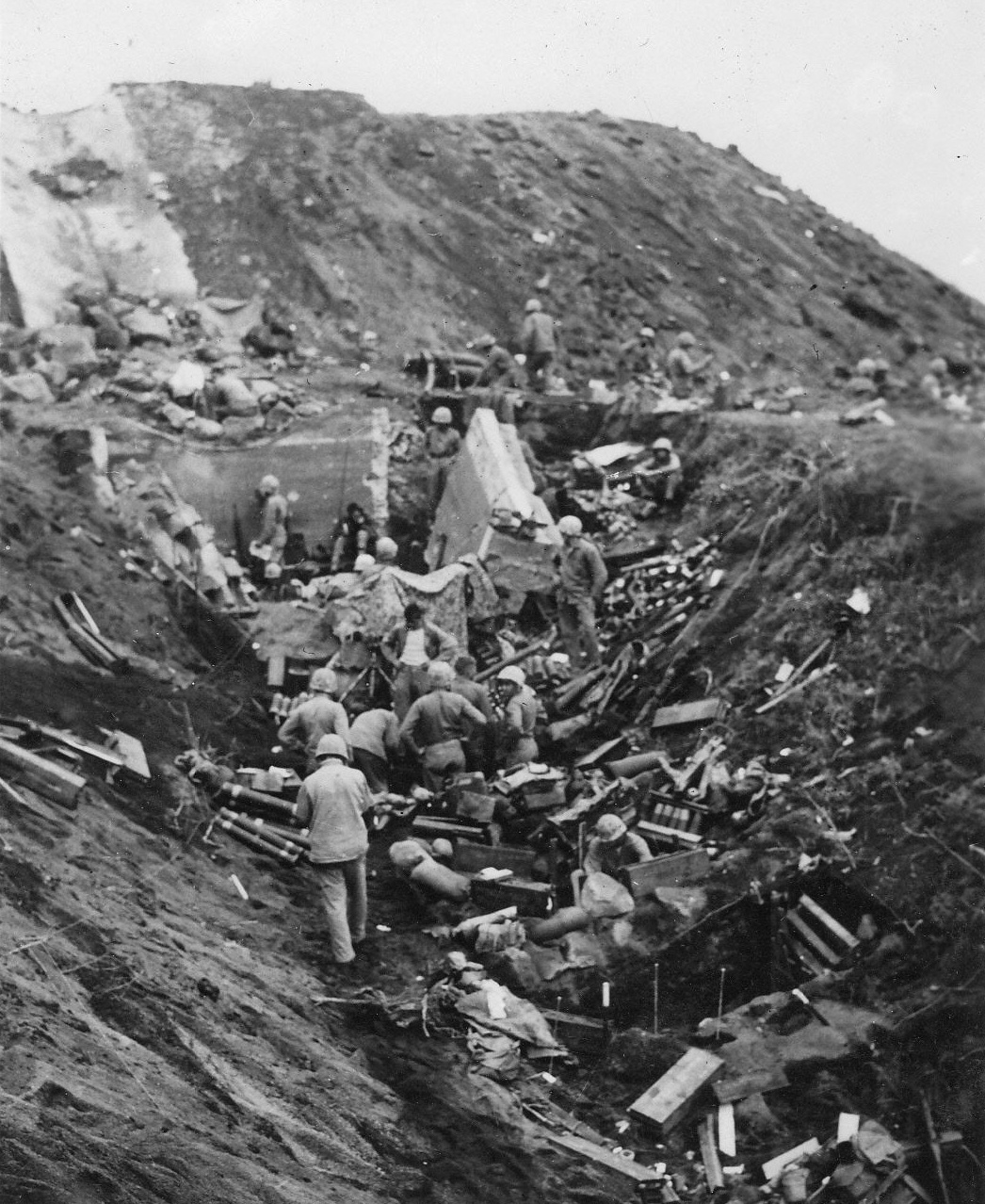
Culvert serves as command post for 23rd Marine Regiment on Iwo Jima

The Marines learned that firearms were relatively ineffective against the Japanese defenders, and turned to flamethrowers and grenades to flush the Japanese troops out of their tunnels. One of the technological innovations of the battle, the eight Sherman M4A3R3 medium tanks equipped with a flamethrower ("Ronson" or "Zippo" tanks), proved highly effective at clearing hardened Japanese positions. The Shermans were difficult to disable, often requiring Japanese defenders to assault them in the open, where they were vulnerable to the superior numbers and firepower of the Marines.

Close air support was initially provided by fighters from escort carriers off the coast. This shifted over to the 15th Fighter Group, flying P-51 Mustangs, after they arrived on the island on 6 March. Similarly, illumination rounds (flares), used to light up the battlefield at night, were initially provided by ships but were later provided by land-based artillery. Navajo code talkers were part of the American ground communications system, along with walkie-talkies and SCR-610 backpack radio sets.

After running out of water, food and most other supplies, Japanese troops became desperate toward the end of the battle. Kuribayashi, who had argued against banzai attacks for most of the fighting, realized defeat was imminent.

Marines began to face increasing numbers of nighttime attacks; these were only repelled by a combination of machine-gun fire and artillery support. At times, the Marines engaged in hand-to-hand fighting to repel the Japanese attacks. Once the landing area was secured, more troops and heavy equipment came ashore, and the Americans proceeded north to capture the airfields and the remainder of the island. Most Japanese soldiers fought to the death.

== Raising the flag on Mount Suribachi ==
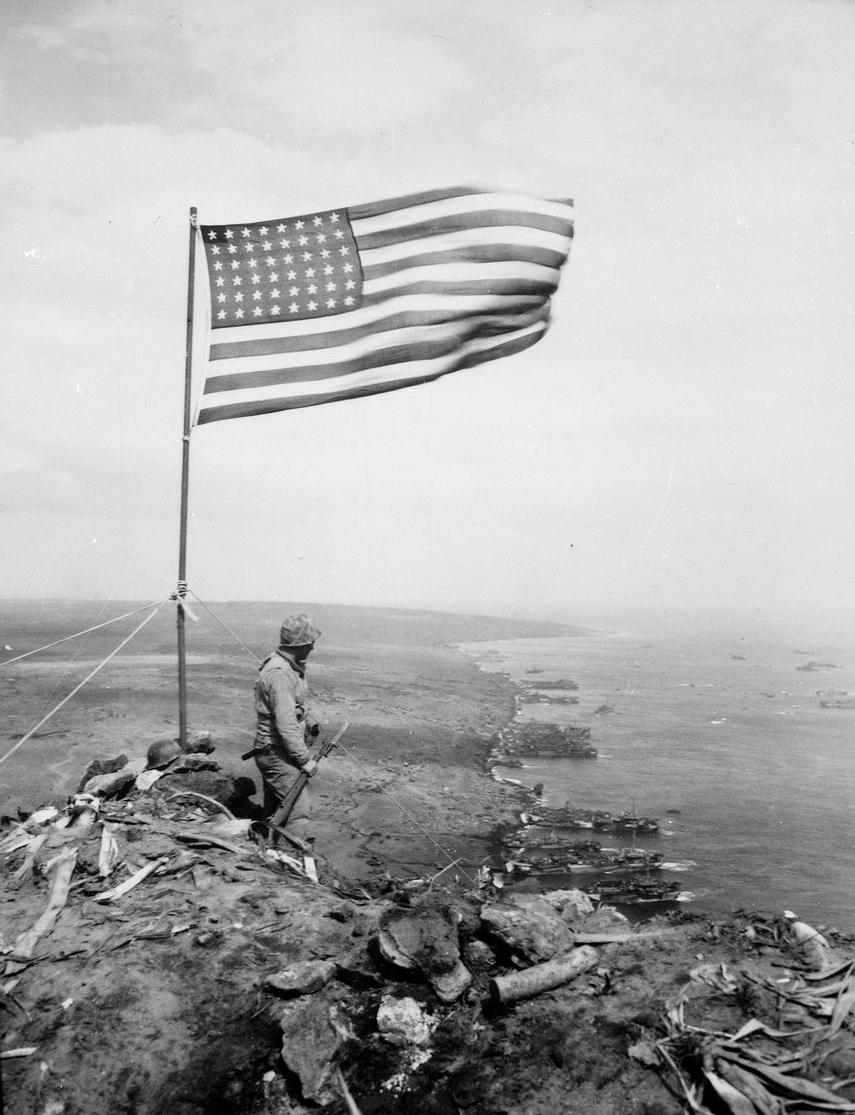
U.S. flag over Mount Suribachi

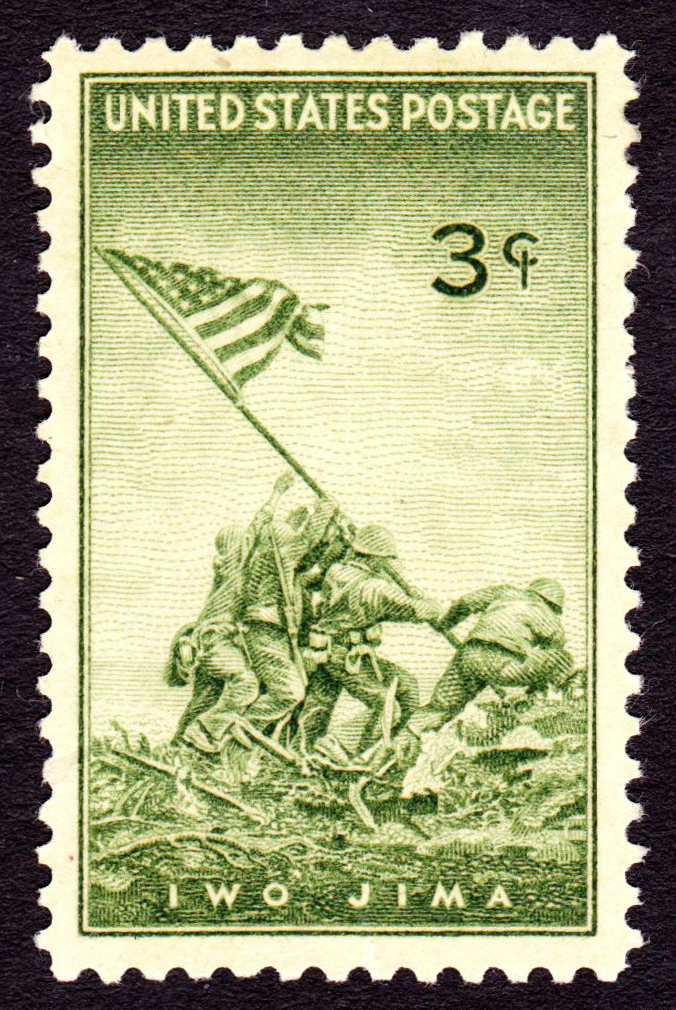
U.S. postage stamp, 1945 issue, commemorating the Battle of Iwo Jima

Raising the Flag on Iwo Jima is a black and white photograph taken by Joe Rosenthal depicting six Marines from E Company, 2nd Battalion, 28th Marines, raising a U.S. flag atop Mount Suribachi on 23 February 1945, the second of two flag-raisings on the site that day. The photograph was extremely popular, being reprinted in thousands of publications. Later, it became the only photograph to win the Pulitzer Prize for Photography in the same year as its publication, becoming one of the most significant and recognizable images of the war and possibly the most reproduced photograph of all time. The image was later used by Felix de Weldon to sculpt the 1954 Marine Corps War Memorial located adjacent to Arlington National Cemetery.

By the morning of 23 February, Mount Suribachi was effectively cut off above ground from the rest of the island. The Marines knew there was an extensive network of below-ground defenses, and that in spite of its isolation above ground, the volcano was still connected via the tunnel network. They expected a fierce fight for the summit. Two small patrols from two rifle companies of the 2/28 Marines were sent up the volcano to reconnoiter routes on the mountain's north face. The recon patrols made it to the summit and scrambled down again, reporting all enemy contacts to the 2/28 Marines commander, Lieutenant Colonel Chandler W. Johnson.

Popular accounts published by the press in the aftermath of the release of the photo of the flag raising had the Marines fighting all the way up to the summit. Although the riflemen expected an ambush, the larger patrol going up afterwards encountered only a few defenders once on top and after the flag was raised. The majority of the Japanese troops stayed in the tunnel network during shelling, only occasionally attacking in small groups, and were generally all killed.

Johnson called for a reinforced platoon-size patrol from E Company to climb Suribachi and seize and occupy the crest. The patrol commander, First Lieutenant Harold G. Schrier, was handed the battalion's American flag to be raised on top to signal Suribachi's capture, if they reached the summit. Johnson and the Marines anticipated heavy fighting, but the patrol encountered only a small amount of sniper fire on the way up the mountain. After the mountain top was secured by Schrier and his men, a length of Japanese water pipe was found among the wreckage; the American flag was attached to the pipe, then raised and planted atop Mount Suribachi, the first foreign flag to fly on Japanese soil. Photographs of the flag and some of the patrol members around it were taken by Marine photographer Louis R. Lowery, the only photographer who had accompanied Schrier's patrol up the mountain.

As the flag went up, Secretary of the Navy James Forrestal had just landed on the beach at the foot of Mount Suribachi and decided that he wanted the flag as a souvenir. Johnson believed that the flag belonged to the 2nd Battalion, 28th Marines, who had captured that section of the island. In the early afternoon, Johnson sent Gagnon, a runner (messenger) from his battalion for E Company, to take a larger flag up the volcano to replace the smaller and less visible flag. The replacement flag was attached to a heavier section of water pipe, and six Marines proceeded to raise it into place as the smaller flag was taken down and delivered to the battalion's headquarters down below. It was during this second flag-raising that Rosenthal took the iconic photograph "Raising the Flag on Iwo Jima". The second flag flew on Mount Suribachi until it was taken down on 14 March, when, at the same time, an American flag was officially raised during a ceremony at the V Amphibious Corps command post near Mount Suribachi. The official flag raising was ordered by General Holland Smith and attended by General Erskine and some members of the 3rd Marine Division.

Three of the six Marines depicted in the photograph, Sergeant Michael Strank, Corporal Harlon Block, and Private First Class Franklin Sousley, were killed in action days after the flag-raising. Surviving flag-raiser Private First Class Ira Hayes, together with Private First Class Rene Gagnon and Navy hospital corpsman Pharmacist's Mate Second Class John Bradley, became celebrities upon their participation in a war bond selling tour after the battle. Three subsequent Marine Corps investigations into the identities of the six men in the photograph determined: in 1946 and 1947, that Harlon Block was incorrectly identified as Henry Hansen (both killed six days after the photo was taken); in May and June 2016, that John Bradley was not in the photograph and Private First Class Harold Schultz was; and in 2019, that Rene Gagnon was not in the photograph and Private First Class Harold Keller was.

== Northern Iwo Jima ==
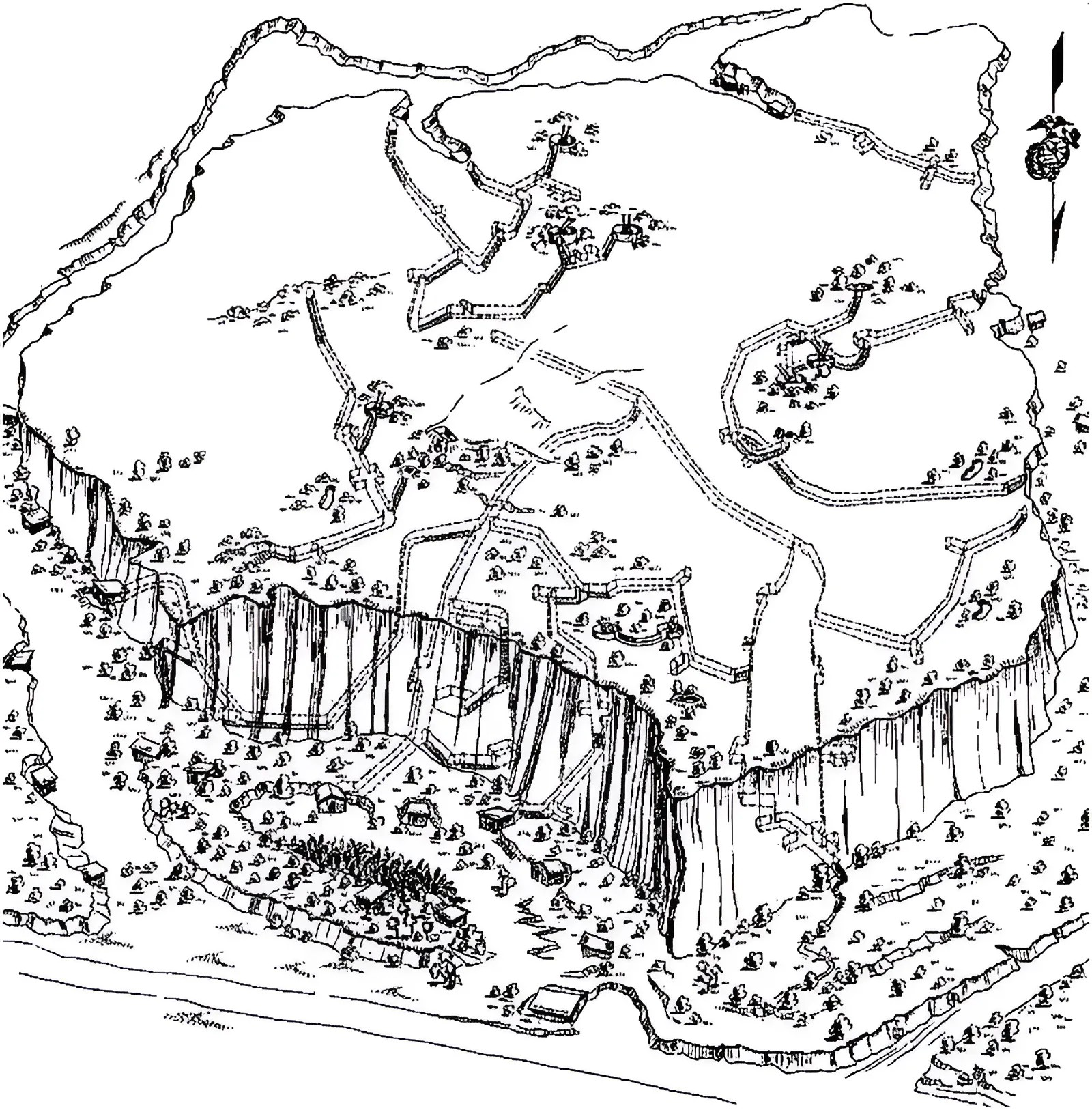
Sketch of Hill 362A, made by the 31st U.S. Naval Construction Battalion. Dotted lines show the Japanese tunnel system.

Despite the loss of Mount Suribachi on the south end of the island, the Japanese still held strong positions on the north end. The rocky terrain vastly favored defense, even more so than Mount Suribachi, which was much more vulnerable to naval artillery fire. The fortifications on the northern section of Iwo Jima were also more impressive than those at the southern end of the island. Remaining under the command of Kuribayashi was the equivalent of eight infantry battalions, a tank regiment, and two artillery and three heavy mortar battalions. There were also about 5,000 gunners and naval infantry available for combat. The most arduous task left to the Marines was seizing the Motoyama Plateau, with its distinctive Hill 382 and "Turkey knob", as well as the area in between, referred to as "the Amphitheater". These obstacles formed the basis of what came to be known to the Marines as the "meatgrinder". While these Japanese positions were being reduced on the right flank, American units on the left were clearing out Hill 362 with just as much difficulty.

The Marines' overall objective at this point was to take control of Airfield No. 2 in the center of the island. However, every "penetration seemed to become a disaster" as "units were raked from the flanks, chewed up, and sometimes wiped out. Tanks were destroyed by interlocking fire or were hoisted into the air on the spouting fireballs of buried mines". As a result, the fighting bogged down, and American casualties piled up rapidly. Even capturing these points did not guarantee that the captured territory was secure, since a previously cleared fortification could be reoccupied by Japanese troops utilizing the island's tunnel system. As such, it was said that "[the Marines] could take these heights at will, and then regret it".

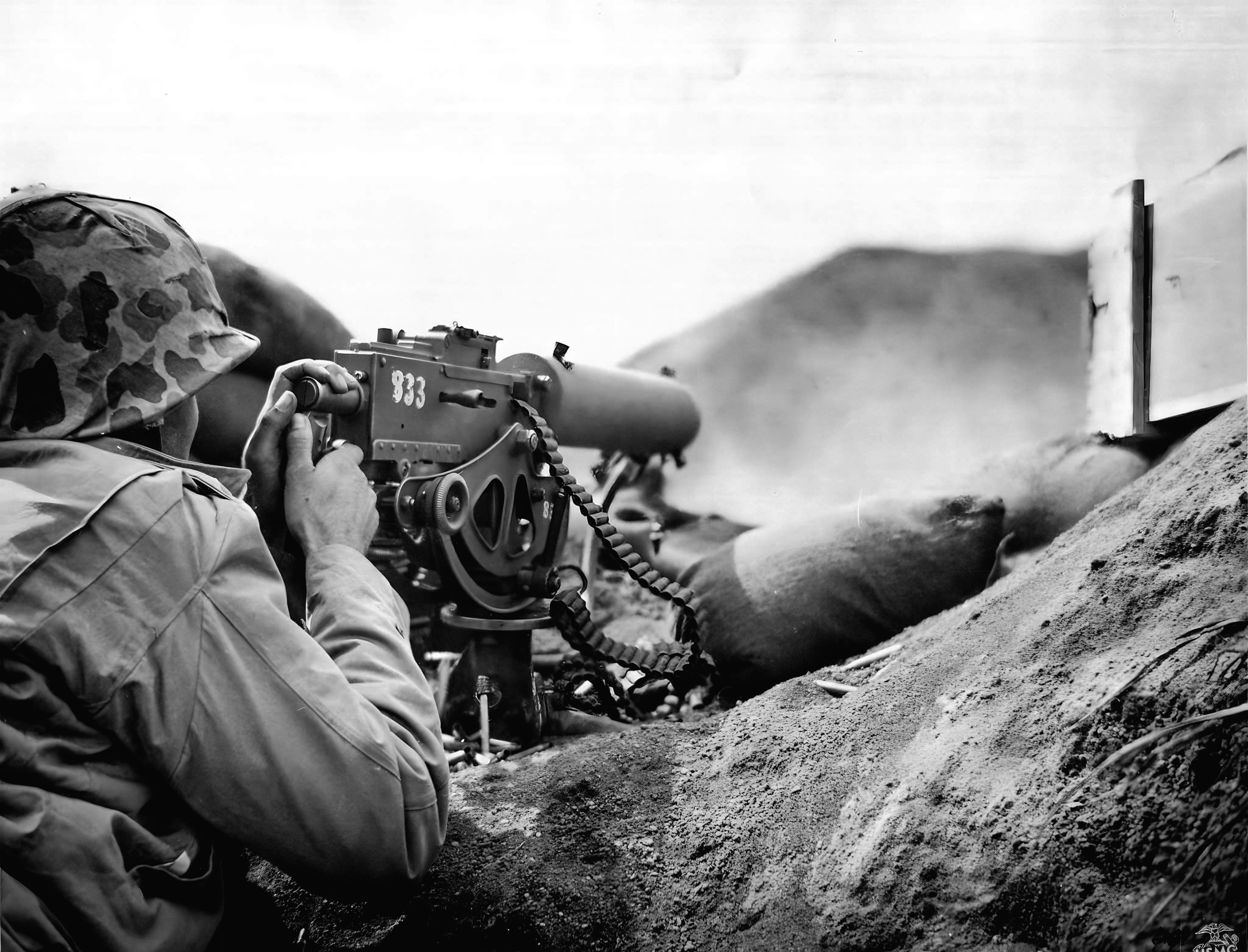
A U.S. Marine firing his Browning M1917 machine gun at the Japanese

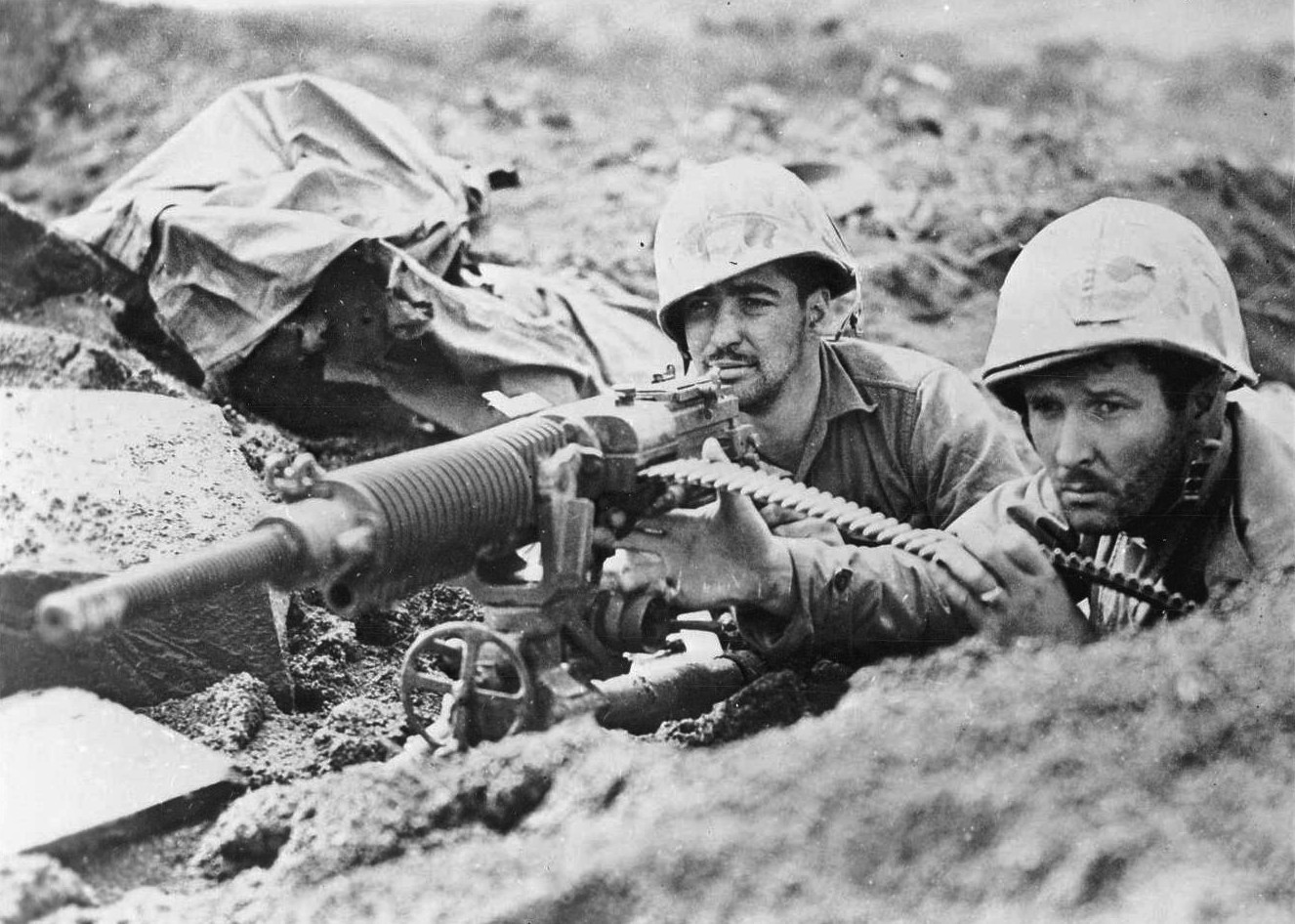
Two Marines using a "Hotch Kiss" from the Japanese, 1945

American troops observed that during bombardments, the Japanese would hide their guns and themselves in caves, only to reemerge when Marine units began to advance and lay down devastating fire on them. Over time, the Japanese learned basic American combat tactics, which usually involved laying down a heavy bombardment before an infantry attack. Consequently, Erskine ordered the 9th Marine Regiment to attack under cover of darkness with no preliminary barrage. This was a resounding success, with many Japanese soldiers killed while still asleep. This became a key moment in the capture of Hill 362. The hill held such strategic importance that the Japanese organized a counterattack to retake it the following night. Although Kuribayashi had forbidden the massed infantry charges often used by the Japanese in previous battles in the Pacific, the local IJA commander of the area decided on a banzai charge with the optimistic goal of recapturing Mount Suribachi.

On the evening of 8 March, Captain Samaji Inouye and his 1,000 men charged the American lines, inflicting 347 casualties (90 deaths). The Marines counted 784 dead Japanese soldiers the next day. The same day, elements of the 3rd Marine Division reached the northern coast of the island, splitting Kuribayashi's defenses in two. There was also a kamikaze air attack (the only one of the battle) on the ships anchored at sea on 21 February, which resulted in the sinking of the escort carrier USS Bismarck Sea, severe damage to USS Saratoga, and slight damage to the escort carrier USS Lunga Point, an LST, and a transport.

Although the island was declared secure at 18:00 on 16 March (25 days after the landings), the 5th Marine Division still faced Kuribayashi's main stronghold, located in a gorge 640 m (700 yd) long at the northwestern end of the island. On 21 March, the Marines destroyed the command post in the gorge with four tons of explosives, and on 24 March Marines sealed the remaining caves at the northern tip of the island. However, on the night of 25 March, a 300-man Japanese force launched a final counterattack in the vicinity of Airfield No. 2. Army pilots, Seabees, and Marines of the 5th Pioneer Battalion and 28th Marines fought the Japanese force for up to 90 minutes, suffering heavy casualties (53 killed, 120 wounded). Although still a matter of speculation due to conflicting accounts from surviving Japanese veterans, it is possible that Kuribayashi personally led this final assault, (Note: "General Kuribayashi may have been killed in this foray; but his body was not identified, and it seems more likely that this brave and resourceful officer committed hara-kiri in his subterranean command post.") which – unlike the loud banzai charge of previous battles – was conducted in silence by the Japanese infantrymen. If he did participate in this assault, Kuribayashi would have been the highest ranking Japanese officer to have personally led an attack during World War II. Additionally, this would also be a departure from the normal practice of commanding Japanese officers committing seppuku behind the lines while their subordinates perished in a last-ditch banzai charge, as occurred during the battles of Saipan and Okinawa. The island was officially declared secure at 09:00 on 26 March.

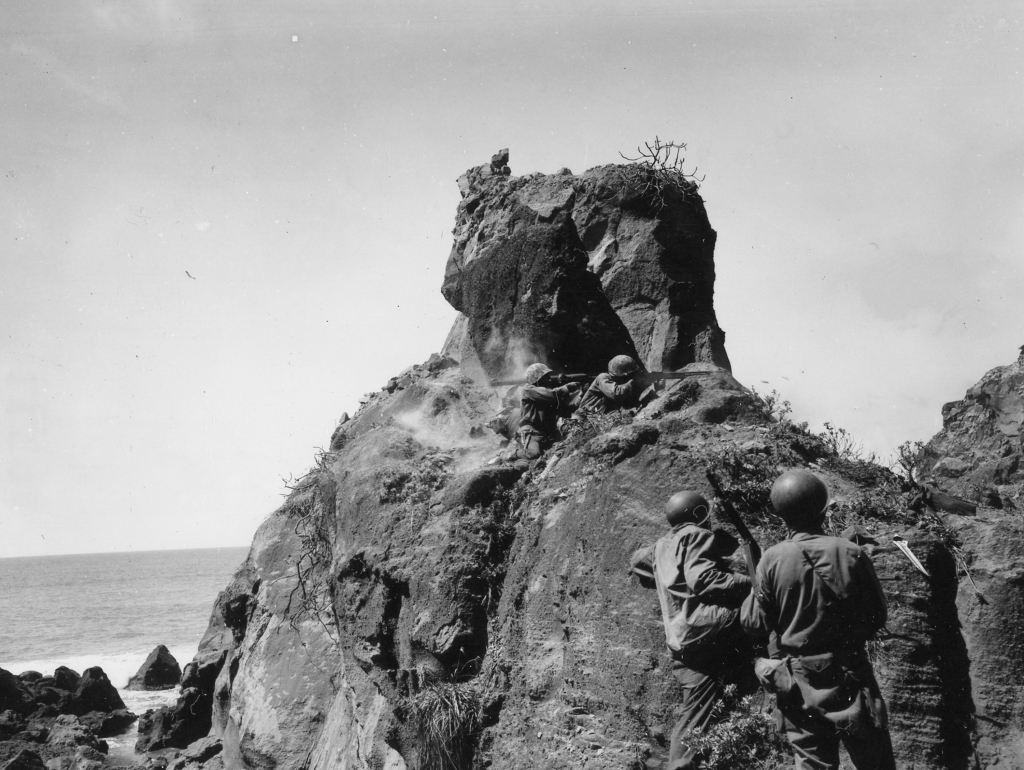
US Army Soldiers engaging Japanese holdouts along Mount Suribachi

Once the island was declared "secure", the U.S. Army's 147th Infantry Regiment was there to eliminate the over 3,000 Japanese soldiers still on the island, finding themselves locked in a bitter struggle against the Japanese holdouts engaging in a guerrilla campaign to harass the Americans. Utilizing caves and tunnel systems, the remnants of the Japanese garrison conducted numerous attacks on American forces. For three months, the 147th slogged across the island, using flamethrowers, grenades, and satchel charges to dig out the enemy, ultimately killing some 1,602 Japanese soldiers in small unit actions (along with many others who died in sealed caves) while suffering fifteen men killed in action and another 144 wounded. The Ohioans were also credited with capturing 867 Japanese soldiers; combined with the number of enemy soldiers killed by the regiment, this casualty figure represented over 10% of the original Japanese garrison.

== Flamethrowers ==
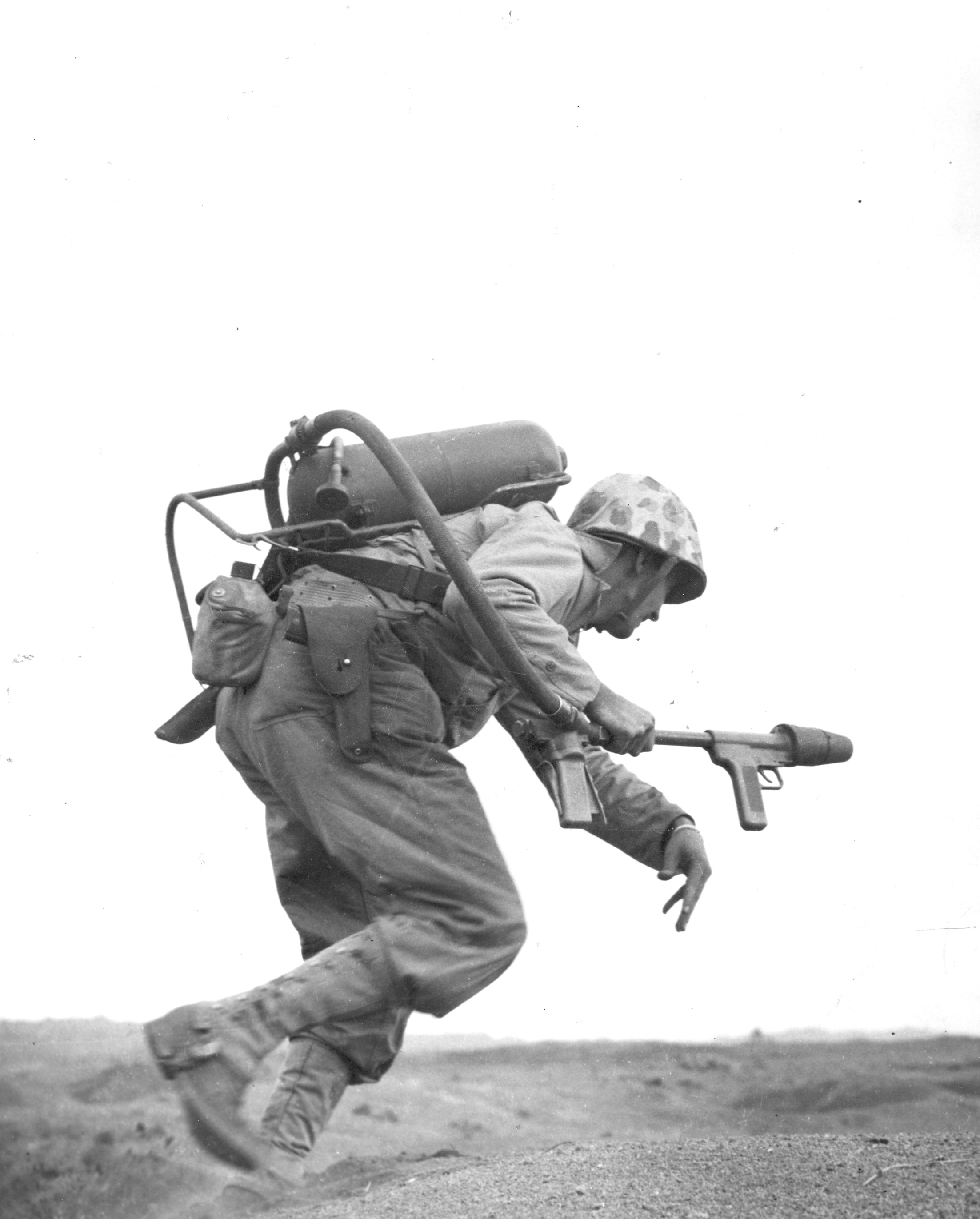
A flamethrower operator of E Company, 2nd Battalion 9th Marines, 3rd Marine Division, runs under fire on Iwo Jima.

The United States M2 flamethrower was heavily used in the Pacific. It features two tanks containing fuel and one of compressed gas, which are combined and ignited to produce a stream of flaming liquid out of the tip.

Flamethrowers were used to kill Japanese inside pillboxes, buildings and caves. A battalion would assign one flamethrower per platoon with one reserve flamethrower in each group. Flamethrower operators were usually in more danger than regular troops as the short range of their weapon required close combat, and the visibility of the flames on the battlefield made them a prominent target for snipers. Still, they were essential to breaking the dug-in enemy.

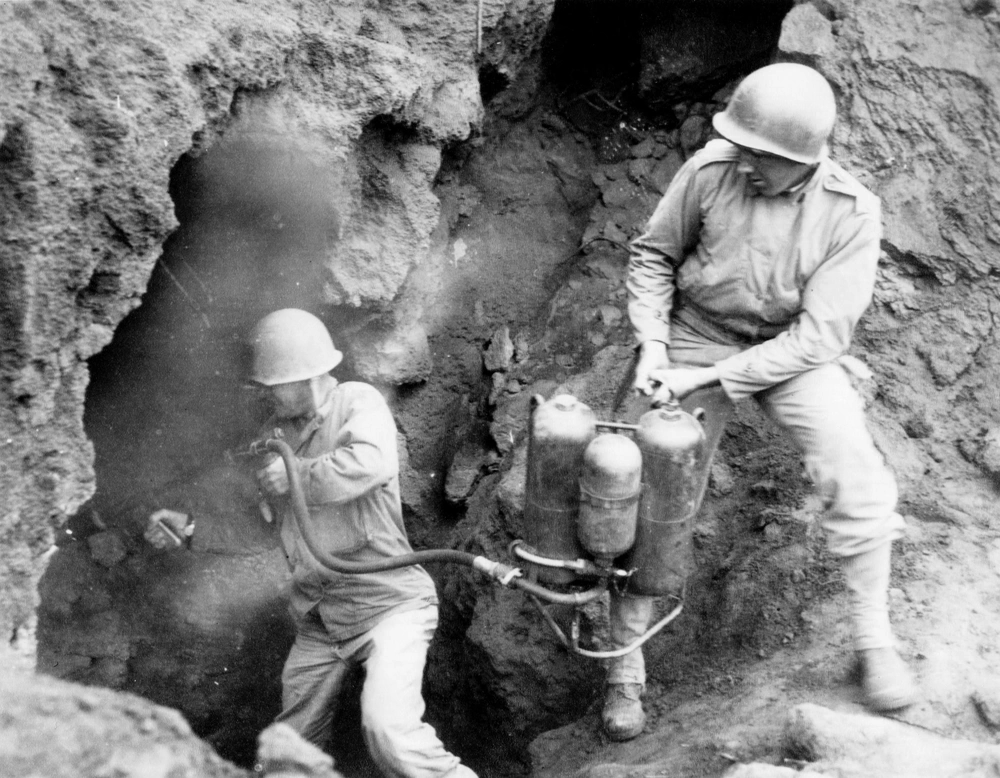
US Army Soldiers clearing caves on Mount Suribachi with a flamethrower

For better protection, flamethrowers were mounted on flame tanks, and one battalion commander called these the "best single weapon of the operation." Prior to Saipan, the Marine Corps had left flamethrowing tank development to the Army. They had placed an order with the Army for nine tanks per division. At Schofield Barracks in Hawaii, Colonel Unmacht's top secret "Flame Thrower Group" located eight M4A3 Sherman medium tanks to convert for Operation Detachment. His Seabees, from the 117th CB, worked to combine the best features of three different flame units, the Ronson, the Navy model I and the Navy Mk-1, which soon led to the far better CB-H2. The U.S. Army Chemical Corps variously identified these tanks as POA-CWS-H1, (Pacific Ocean Area-Chemical Warfare Section-Hawaii) CWS-POA-H2, CWS-POA-H1 H2, OR CWS-"75"-H1 H2 mechanized flamethrowers. U.S. Marine and U.S. Army observer documents from Iwo Jima refer to them as the CB-Mk-1 or CB-H1. Marines on the lines simply called them the Mark I. The official USMC designation was "M4 A3R5". The Japanese referred to them as M1 tanks, and it is speculated that they did so because of a poor translation of "MH-1".

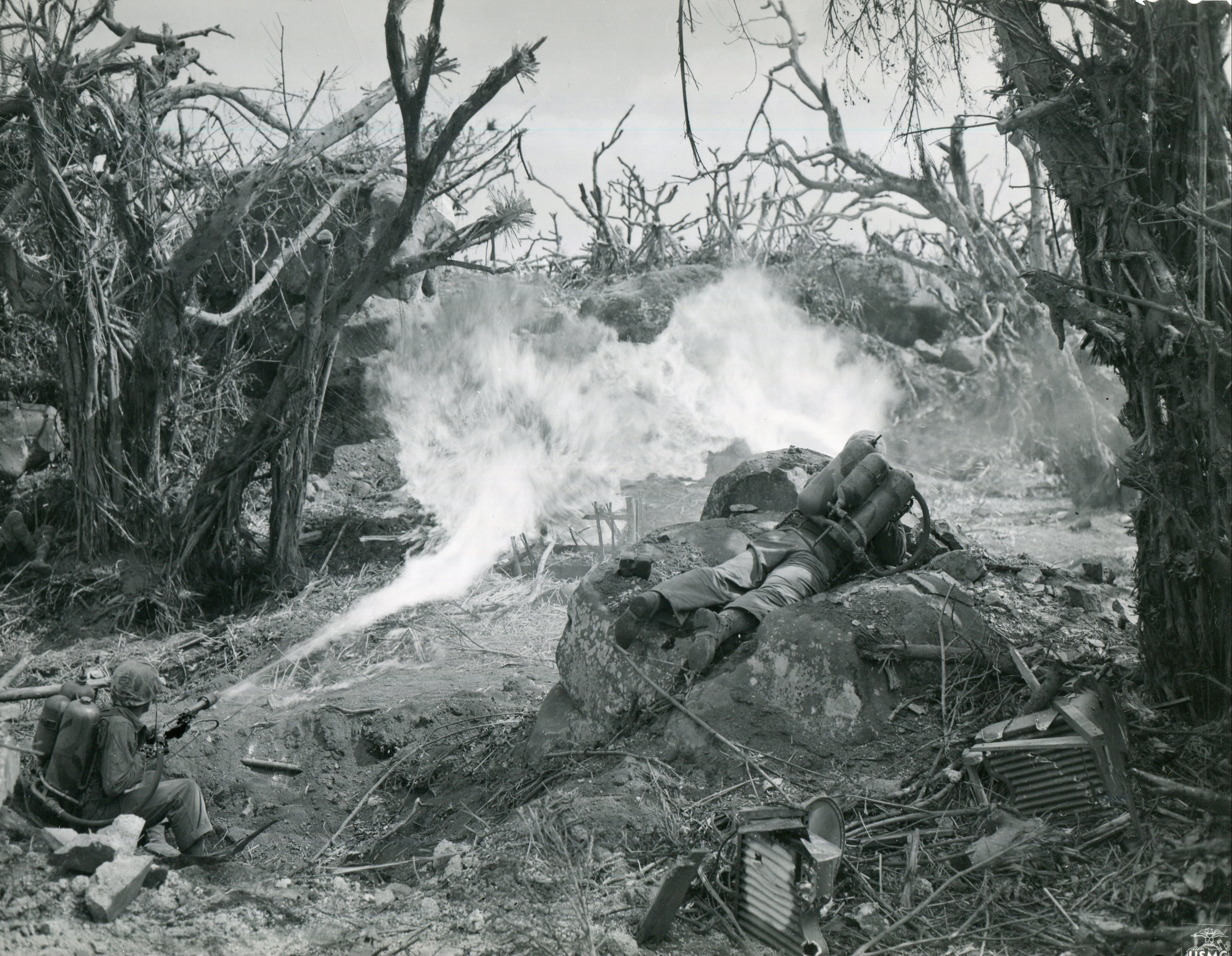
Two Marines throwing fire at the defenses which blocked the way to Mount Suribachi, D-Day, February 19

On Iwo Jima the flame tanks all landed on D-Day and went into action on D+2, sparingly at first. As the battle progressed, portable flame units wielded on foot sustained casualty rates up to 92%, leaving few troops trained to use the weapon. More and more calls came for the Mark-1 flame tanks, to the point that the Marines became dependent upon them and would hold up their assault until a flame tank was available. Since each tank battalion had only four, they were pooled among units and would dispatch from their respective refueling locations as the battle progressed. Towards the end of the battle, 5th Marine tanks expended between 5,000 to 10,000 US gal (19,000 to 38,000 L) of napalm per day.

== Navajo Code Talkers ==
Navajo code talkers were a vital part of the U.S. Pacific campaign, and especially in the Battle of Iwo Jima. "Before the War Navajo boys were sent to a boarding school where Indians were taught to read, write and speak English. If they were caught speaking Navajo they would be punished. "This caused the United States to almost lose one of its secret weapons. When the Attack on Pearl Harbor happened in 1941 "The United States had been caught unprepared. In addition to being out-manned, outgunned and outsmarted in the early days of the war, the U.S. was also out-coded, as the Japanese forces had broken the coding system of the Pacific fleet."

This prompted the U.S. armed forces to search for new sources for codes. In 1942, Sergeant Phillip Johnson was assigned to direct the code training of Platoon 382 made up of Navajo men. "They were trained in sending and receiving messages from air to ground, ship to shore, tank to command post. Messages included missions and maneuvers, location and strength of the enemy, time and place of attack and other tactical orders." While on the Island of Iwo Jima, "Code Talkers acted as forward observers, calling in artillery strikes against positions that were causing the Marines problems. Code Talkers on land would radio positions to a command ship offshore, their messages then given to admirals and generals. A new strike plan would be drawn then the information transmitted back onto the shore all without being tapped by the Japanese, to whom such information would have proven decisive" "By the end of the battle, Billison and other Code Talkers had transmitted more than 800 messages error-free." These messages would be important information like new plans, or artillery barrages from the Navy Ships. Overall, the Navajo Code Talkers played a significant part in the U.S. success in the Pacific and Iwo Jima. There were only 28 non-Navajos who could speak the language, none of whom were German or Japanese. The Navajo language is challenging for speakers of European or East Asian languages to learn; and even if learned, it would be hard to imitate a native speaker. Japanese forces tried to bribe the Navajo to decipher the code, but they remained loyal to the United States.

== Aftermath ==
Japanese holdouts on the island, including two of Lieutenant Toshihiko Ohno's men, Yamakage Kufuku [sic] (山蔭光福, Yamakage Kōfuku) and Matsudo Linsoki [sic] (松戸利喜夫, Matsudo Rikio), lasted four years without being caught, and finally surrendered on 6 January 1949.

The American victory at Iwo Jima had been extremely costly. According to the Navy Department Library, "the 36-day assault resulted in more than 26,000 American casualties, including 6,800 dead." By comparison, the much larger-scale 82-day Battle of Okinawa lasting from early April until mid-June 1945 (involving five U.S. Army and two Marine Corps divisions) resulted in over 62,000 U.S. casualties, of whom over 12,000 were killed or missing. Iwo Jima was also the only U.S. Marine battle where the American casualties exceeded those of the Japanese, although Japanese combat deaths numbered three times as many as American KIA. Two U.S. Marines were captured during the battle, neither of whom survived their captivity.

The USS Bismarck Sea was sunk during the battle, the last U.S. aircraft carrier sunk in World War II. 20 Grumman FM-2 Wildcat fighters and 11 Grumman TBM Avenger torpedo bombers went down with Bismarck Sea. The USS Saratoga was so severely damaged that she took no part in either combat or transportation duties for the rest of the war, and became a training ship for night fighter operations. 31 Grumman F6F Hellcat fighters and nine Grumman TBM Avenger torpedo bombers were destroyed by the kamikaze attack on Saratoga along with the loss of 132 men. Because all civilians had been evacuated, there were no civilian casualties on Iwo Jima, unlike at Saipan and Okinawa.

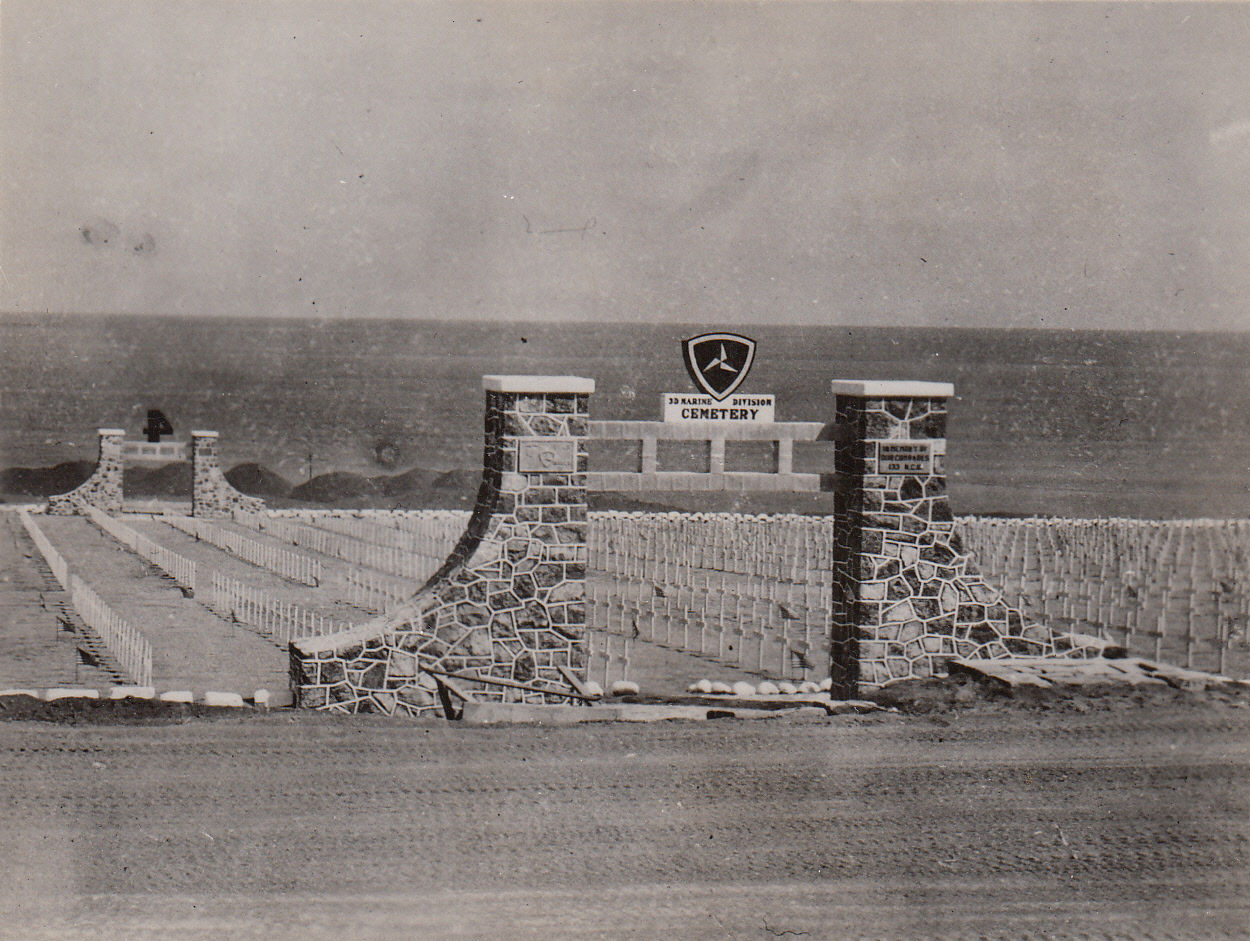
Iwo Jima cemetery entrances built by the 133rd Seabees, with the 3rd Marine Division forward and the 4th Marine Division opposite.

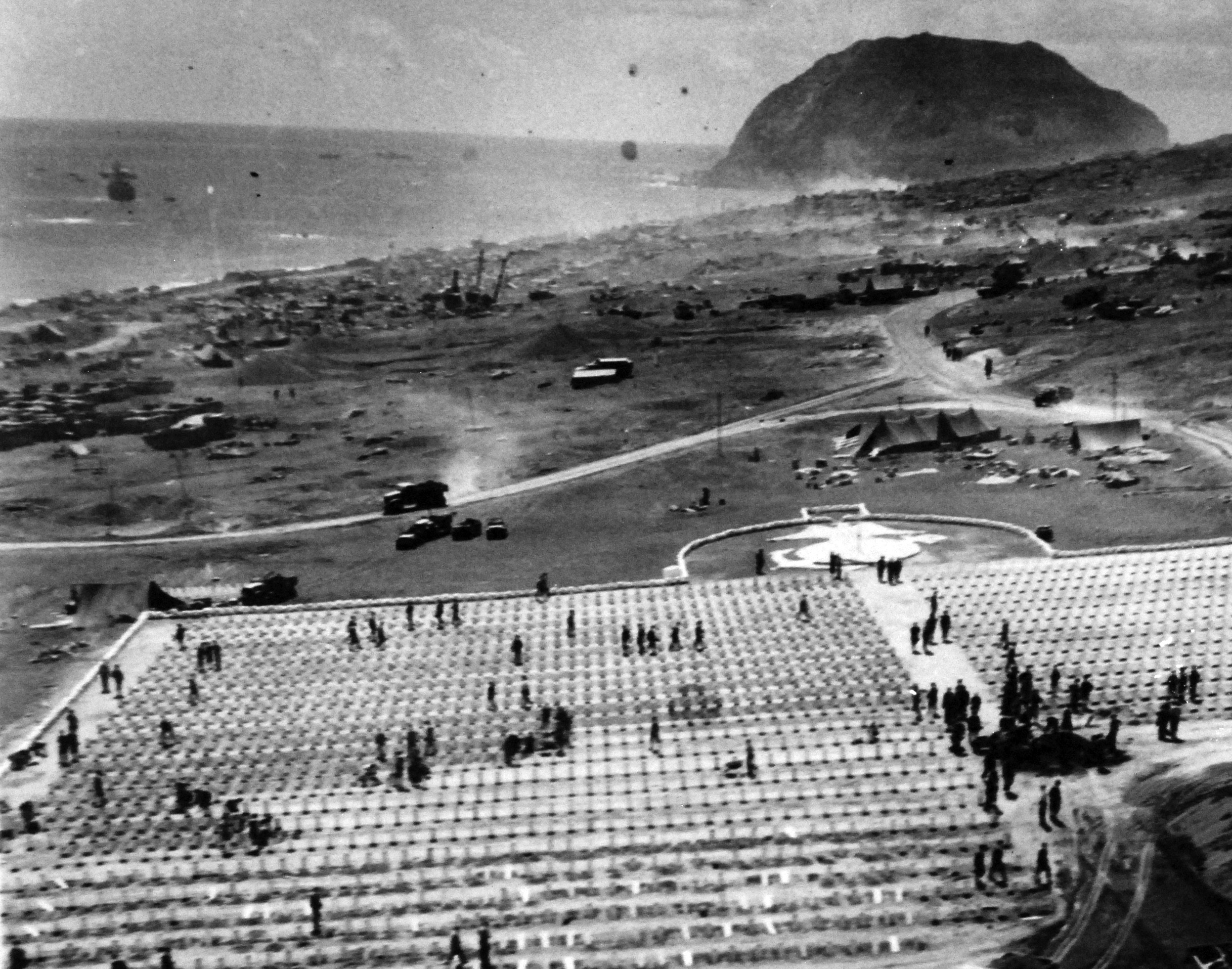
Interments of the 4th Marine Division.

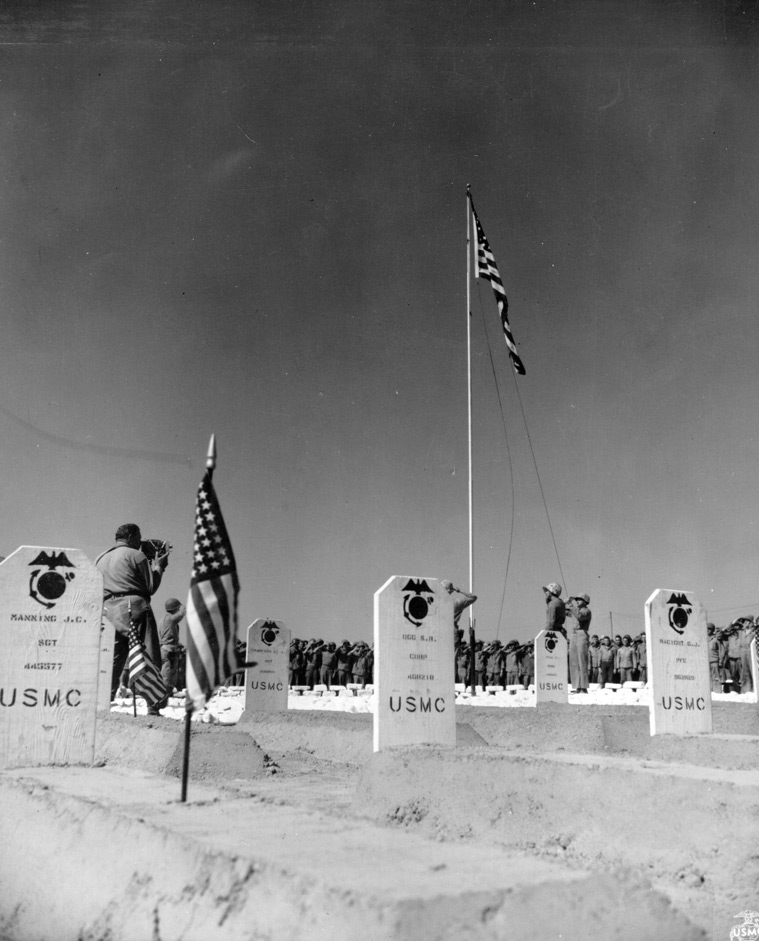
4th USMC Division Cemetery Iwo Jima

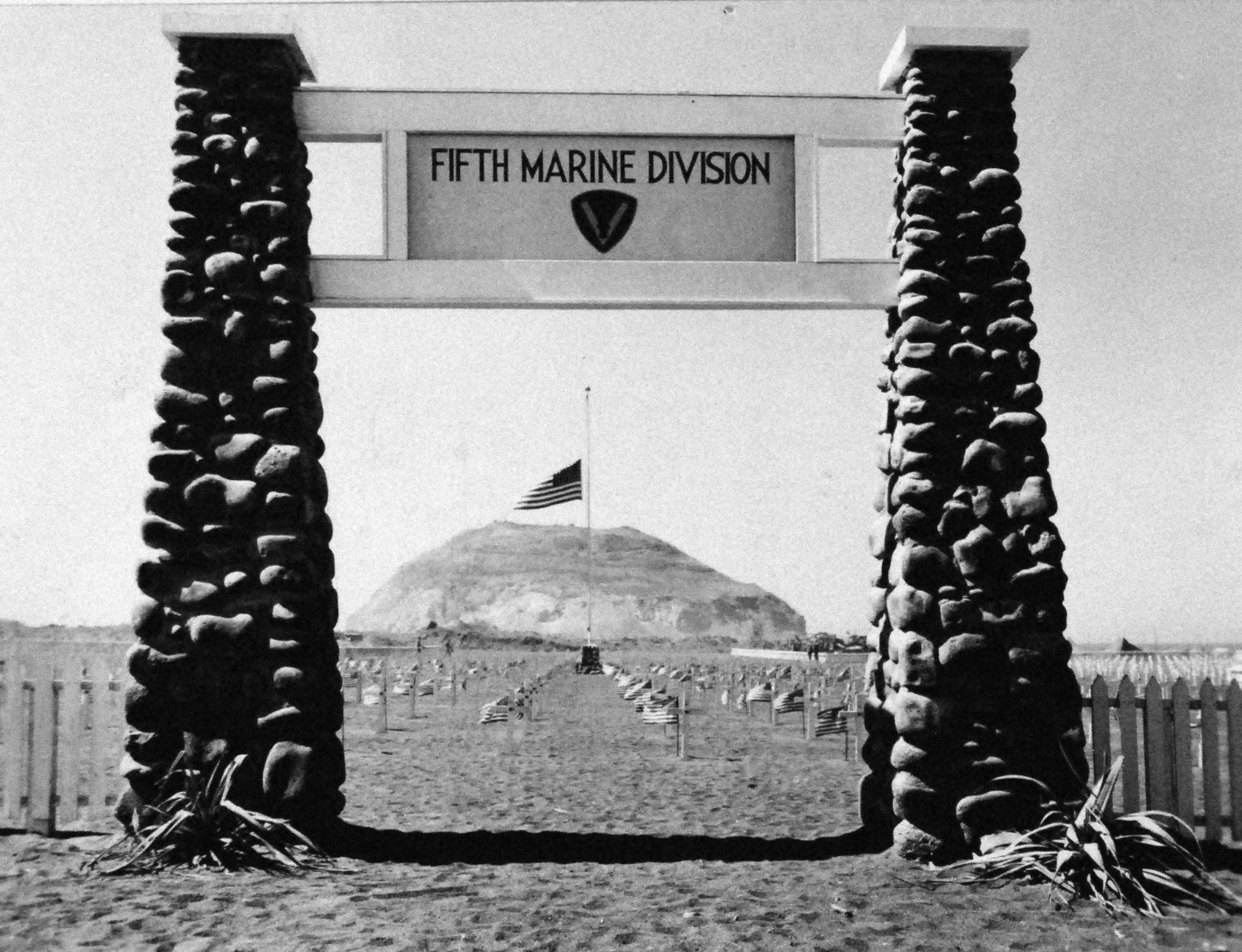
5th USMC Division Cemetery entrance built by the 31st CB with Mt. Suribachi center.

== Strategic importance ==
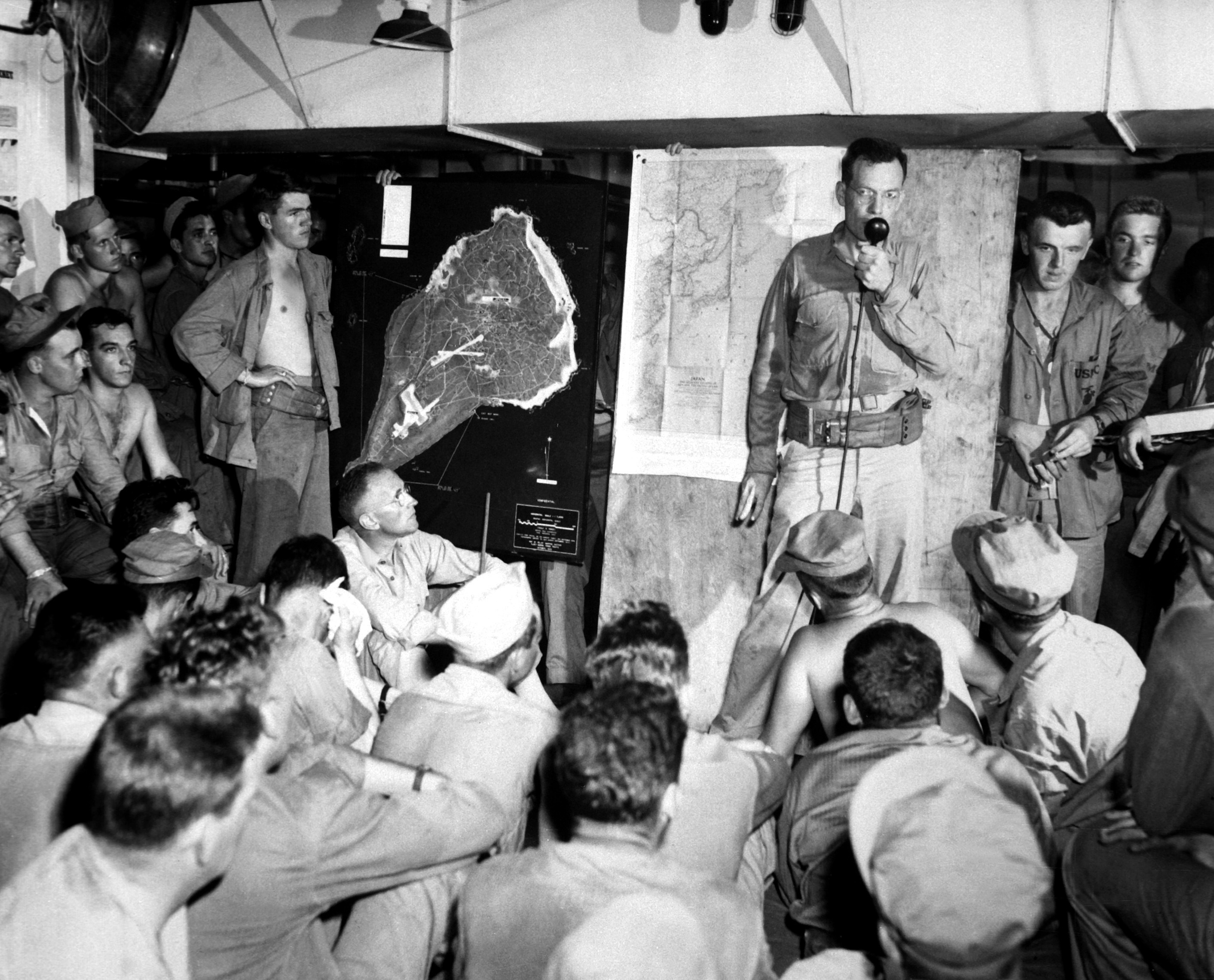
Lieutenant Wade discusses the overall importance of the target at a pre-invasion briefing.

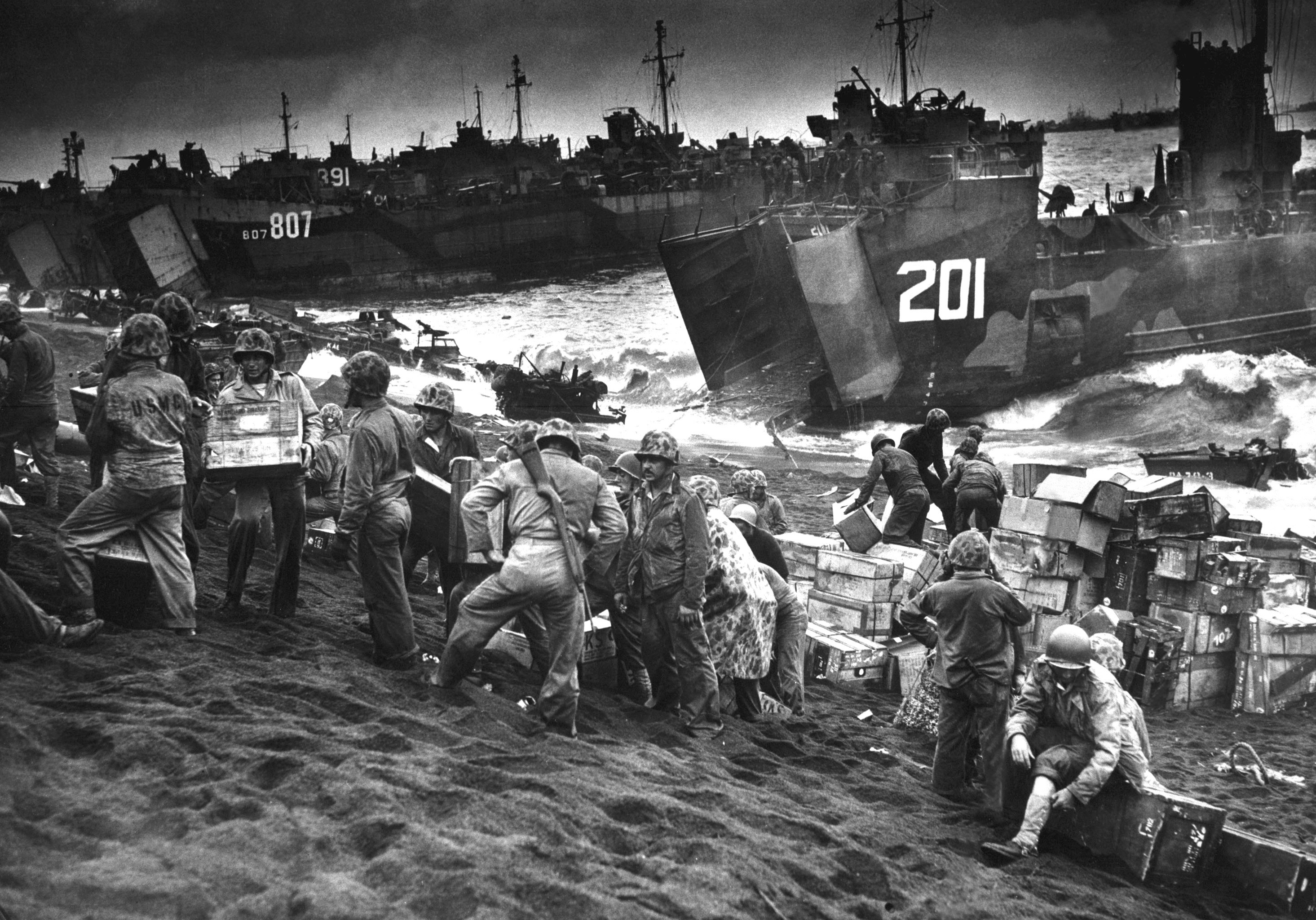
American supplies being landed at Iwo Jima

In hindsight, given the number of casualties, the necessity and long-term significance of the island's capture to the outcome of the war became a contentious issue and remains disputed. The Marines, who conducted the landings and suffered the vast majority of the casualties, had not been consulted in the planning of the operation. As early as April 1945, retired Chief of Naval Operations William V. Pratt stated in Newsweek magazine that the "expenditure of manpower to acquire a small, God-forsaken island, useless to the Army as a staging base and useless to the Navy as a fleet base ... [one] wonders if the same sort of airbase could not have been reached by acquiring other strategic localities at lower cost."

The lessons learned on Iwo Jima served as guidelines for the Battle of Okinawa in April 1945, and influenced American planning for an invasion of the Japanese home islands. For example, on Okinawa, "because of the casualties taken at Iwo Jima on the first day, it was decided to make the preparatory bombardment the heaviest yet delivered on to a Pacific island". Additionally, in the planning for a potential invasion of Japan itself, it was taken into account that around a third of the troops committed to Iwo Jima, and later again at Okinawa, had been killed or wounded.

The justification behind Iwo Jima's strategic importance to the United States' war effort revolves around the island's role as a base for the P-51 Mustangs to serve as long-range fighter escorts for B-29 Superfortress bombers. In actual practice, these escorts proved both impractical and unnecessary, and only ten such missions were flown from Iwo Jima. The actual threat to American bombers from Japanese interceptor fighters continued to diminish, as all that remained in the Japanese inventory were mostly obsolete types, which was exacerbated by numerous quality control issues and fuel shortages as well as insufficient pilot training, and soon the Japanese were saving their remaining planes and fuel for kamikazes. By the time Iwo Jima had been captured, the bombing campaign against Japan had switched from daylight precision bombing to nighttime incendiary attacks, so fighter escorts were of limited utility. Starting in April 1945 and exclusively in July 1945, the P-51s based on Iwo Jima were repurposed from bomber escort to strike and interdiction missions. These raids were frequently made against airfields to destroy aircraft being held in reserve to attack the expected Allied invasion fleet if Operation Downfall commenced. Buildings, ships, and railway rolling stock were also targeted. Author J. Robert Moskin records that 1,191 fighter escorts and 3,081 strike sorties were flown from Iwo Jima against Japan. A more recent Air Force study found the contribution of VII Fighter Command, based on Iwo Jima, to be superfluous.

The Japanese garrison on Iwo Jima possessed radar and was thus able to notify air defenses on the home islands of incoming B-29 Superfortresses flying from the Marianas. However, the capture of Iwo Jima did not affect the Japanese early-warning radar system, which continued to receive information on incoming B-29s from the island of Rota (which was never invaded). Japanese fighter aircraft based on Iwo Jima occasionally intercepted U.S. Army Air Force bombers, which were vulnerable en route to Japan because they were heavily laden with bombs and fuel. However, the impact of Iwo Jima-based Japanese interceptors on the American bombing effort was marginal; in the three months before the invasion, only 11 B-29s had been lost to Japanese aircraft flying out of the Bonin Islands. The Superfortresses largely found it unnecessary to make any major detour around the island. Furthermore, capturing Iwo Jima neutralized the few Japanese air attacks on the Marianas, but these attacks were too small to ever seriously threaten American military assets based on Saipan and Tinian.

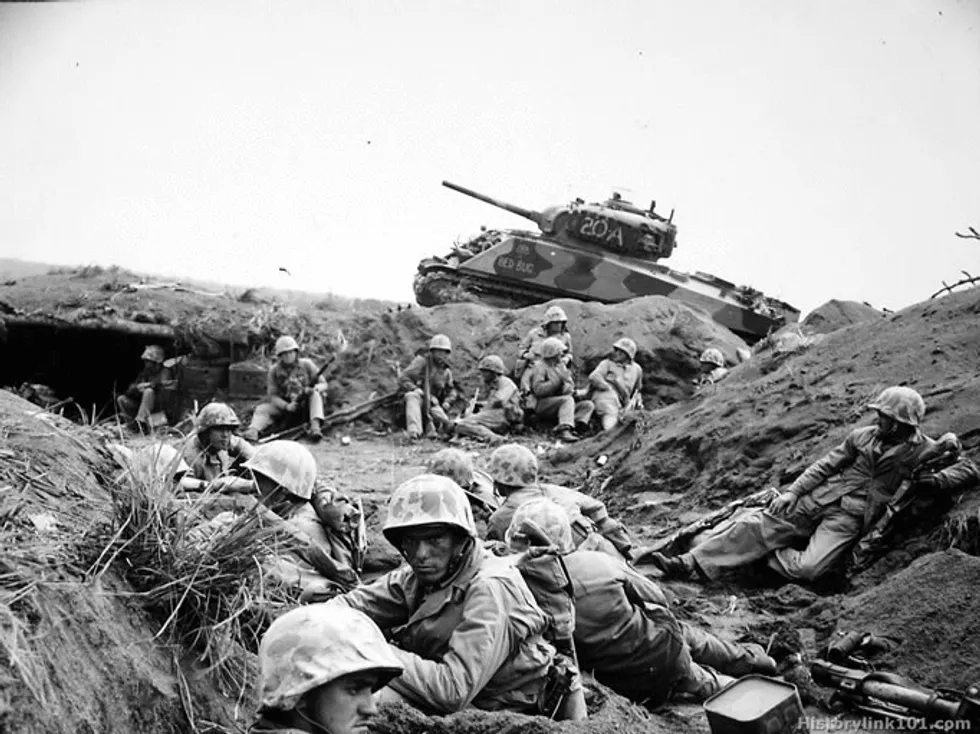
Marines from the 24th Marine Regiment during the Battle of Iwo Jima

As early as 4 March 1945, while fighting was still taking place, the B-29 Dinah Might of the USAAF 9th Bomb Group reported it was low on fuel near the island and requested an emergency landing. Despite enemy fire, the airplane landed on the Allied-controlled section of the island (South Field) without incident and was serviced, refueled and departed. In all, 2,251 B-29 landings on Iwo Jima were recorded during the war. Another rationale for capturing the island was to provide a base for shorter-range B-24 Liberator bombers against Japan, but no significant B-24 bombing campaign ever materialized. Some downed B-29 crewmen were saved by air-sea rescue aircraft and vessels operating from the island, but Iwo Jima was just one of many islands that could have been used for such a purpose. As for the importance of the island as a landing and refueling site for bombers, Marine Captain Robert Burrell, then a history instructor at the United States Naval Academy, suggested that only a small proportion of the 2,251 landings were for genuine emergencies, with the vast majority possibly being for minor technical checkups, training, or refueling. According to Burrell,

This justification became prominent only after the Marines seized the island and incurred high casualties. The tragic cost of Operation Detachment pressured veterans, journalists, and commanders to fixate on the most visible rationalization for the battle. The sight of the enormous, costly, and technologically sophisticated B-29 landing on the island's small airfield most clearly linked Iwo Jima to the strategic bombing campaign. As the myths about the flag raisings on Mount Suribachi reached legendary proportions, so did the emergency landing theory in order to justify the need to raise that flag.

The "emergency landing" thesis counts every B-29 landing on Iwo Jima as an emergency and asserts that capturing the island saved the lives of the nearly 25,000 crewmen of all 2,251 planes (2,148 B-29 crewmen were killed in combat during the entire war in all theaters). However, of the nearly 2,000 B-29s which landed from May–July 1945, more than 80% were for routine refueling. Several hundred landings were made for training purposes, and most of the remainder were for relatively minor engine maintenance. During June 1945, which saw the largest number of landings, none of the more than 800 B-29s that landed on the island did so because of combat damage. Of the aircraft that would have been lost without being able to land, air-sea rescue figures indicate that 50% of crewmen who ditched at sea survived, so even if Iwo Jima had not been taken the estimate of the supposedly potential 25,000 dead crewmen from airplanes crashing into the ocean should be dwindled down to 12,500.

According to Robert S. Burrell, author of The Ghosts of Iwo Jima, the very losses formed the basis for a "reverence for the Marine Corps" that not only embodied the "American national spirit" but ensured the "institutional survival" of the Marine Corps.

== Naval vessels badly damaged ==
The following table lists for each ship badly damaged in the Battle of Iwo Jima, the dates they received hits, the cause, the type of ship, and the casualties inflicted during 17–28 February. The carrier USS Lunga Point, which received light damage, was listed because of the importance of escort carriers in the battle.

Naval vessels badly damaged and sunk by Japanese forces at Iwo Jima, primarily kamikazes, 17–28 February 1945 (Note: All information is public domain from United States Navy, with casualties taken from individual action reports; table format and structure is heavily borrowed from Morison 1960, p. 388, Appendix II.)
Ship	Day	Type	Cause	Killed	Wounded
LCI(G)-438	17 Feb 1945	Landing craft infantry / gunboat	Coastal battery	0	4
LCI(G)-441	17 Feb 1945	Landing craft infantry / gunboat	Coastal battery	7	21
LCI(G)-449	17 Feb 1945	Landing craft infantry / gunboat	Coastal battery	21	18
LCI(G)-450	17 Feb 1945	Landing craft infantry / gunboat	Coastal battery	0	6
LCI(G)-457	17 Feb 1945	Landing craft infantry / gunboat	Coastal battery	1	20
LCI(G)-466	17 Feb 1945	Landing craft infantry / gunboat	Coastal battery	5	19
LCI(G)-469	17 Feb 1945	Landing craft infantry / gunboat	Coastal battery	0	7
LCI(G)-473	17 Feb 1945	Landing craft infantry / gunboat	Coastal battery	3	18
LCI(G)-474 *	17 Feb 1945	Landing craft infantry / gunboat	Coastal battery	3	18
Blessman	18 Feb 1945	Destroyer	Aerial bomb over engine room	42	29
Gamble	18 Feb 1945	Destroyer / minesweeper	2 aerial bombs	5	9
LSM-216	20 Feb 1945	Landing ship, medium built	Coastal battery/air attack	0	0
Bismarck Sea *	21 Feb 1945	Escort carrier	5 bomb hits and kamikaze hits, one on low angle dive, hit after elevator, thru to hangar deck, sunk	318	99
Lunga Point	21 Feb 1945	Escort carrier	kamikaze Nakajima B6N skidded into her, light damage	0	6
Saratoga	21 Feb 1945	Carrier	kamikaze dove w/bomb penetration	123	192
Keokuk	21 Feb 1945	Net cargo ship	kamikaze dove w/bomb penetration	17	44
LCI(G)-760	25 Feb 1945	Landing craft infantry, mortar	Coastal battery	0	2
Terry	28 Feb 1945	Destroyer	Coastal battery	11	19
Whitley	28 Feb 1945	Large cargo ship	Air attack	0	5
Total				556	536
Legend: * Ship sunk or scuttled

== Medal of Honor recipients ==
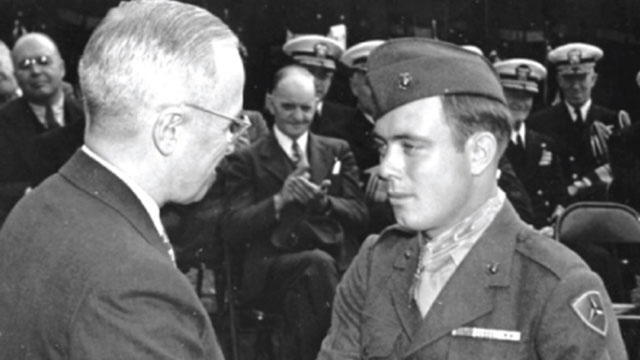
Harry Truman congratulates Marine Corporal Hershel Williams of the Third Marine Division on being awarded the Medal of Honor, 5 October 1945.

The Medal of Honor is the highest military decoration awarded by the United States government. It is bestowed on a member of the United States Armed Forces who distinguishes himself by "... conspicuous gallantry and intrepidity at the risk of his life above and beyond the call of duty while engaged in an action against an enemy of the United States ..." Because of its nature, the medal is commonly awarded posthumously.

The Medal of Honor was awarded to 22 Marines (12 posthumously), and five were presented to sailors, four of whom were hospital corpsmen (two posthumously) attached to Marine infantry units. The medals awarded for the battle accounted for 28% of the 82 awarded to Marines in World War II.

At the time of his death on 29 June 2022, Marine Hershel W. Williams was the last living Medal of Honor recipient from World War II. He received his medal for actions in the Battle of Iwo Jima.

== Legacy ==
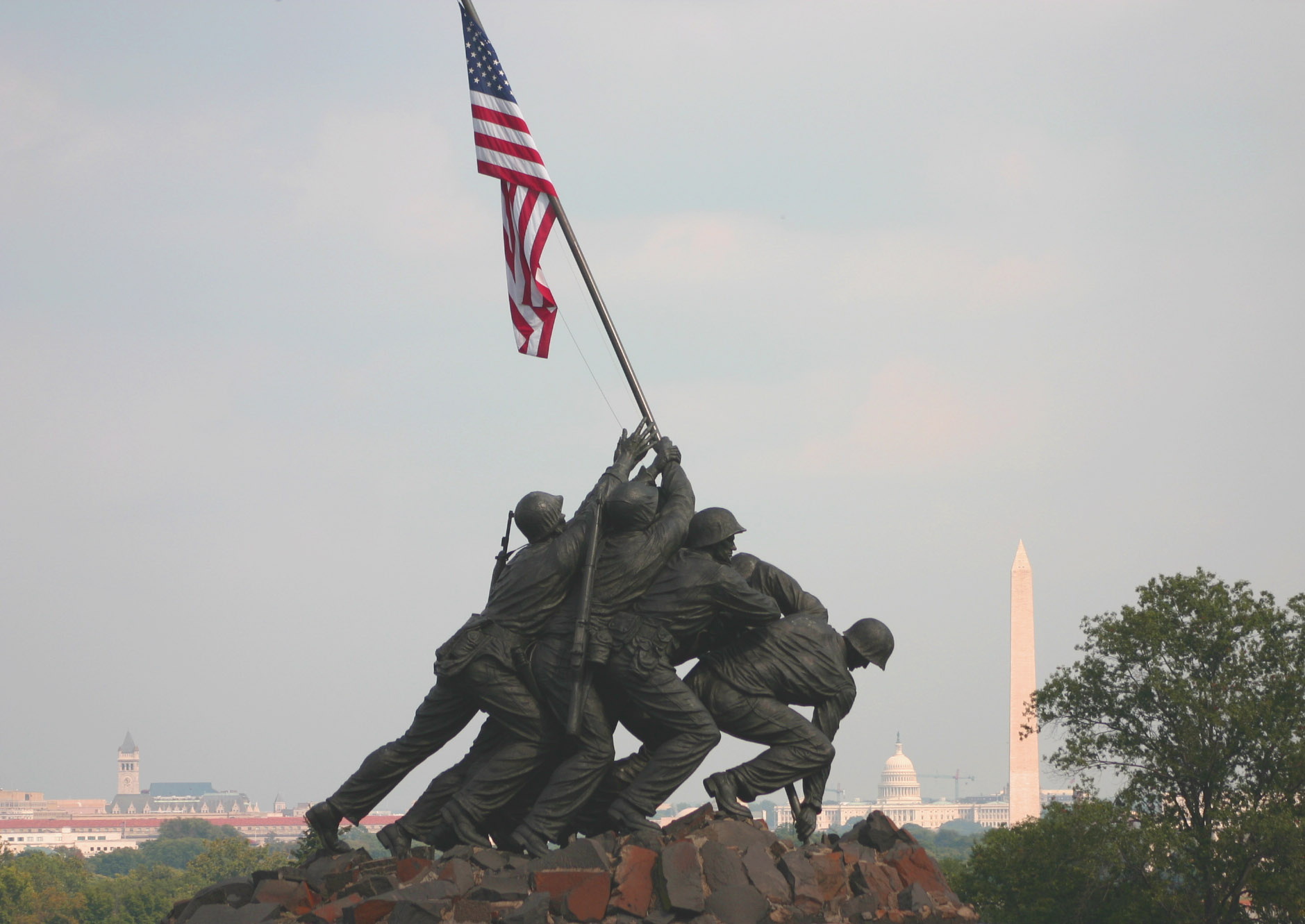
The U.S. Marine Corps War Memorial in Arlington with the Washington Monument and the United States Capitol in the distance.

The Marine Corps Iwo Jima Memorial was dedicated on 10 November 1954 at Arlington National Cemetery.

The USN has commissioned two ships with the name USS Iwo Jima (LPH-2) (1961–1993) and USS Iwo Jima (LHD-7) (2001–present).

The first large reunion of veterans on the island was held in 1970 on the 25th anniversary of the battle. The event was sponsored by the Fifth Marine Division Association and included both American and Japanese veterans of the battle. Other notable attendees included then-Brigadier General William K. Jones commander of the 3rd Marine Division and NBC’s senior correspondent in Asia John Rich. The widows of General Tadamichi Kuribayashi and Colonel Takeichi Nishi also attended events with American veterans held in Tokyo.

On 19 February 1985, the 40th anniversary of the landings on Iwo Jima, an event called the "Reunion of Honor" was held (the event has been held annually since 2002). Veterans of both sides of the battle attended the event, which is sited on the beach where U.S. forces landed. A memorial on which inscriptions were engraved by both sides was built at the center of the meeting place. Japanese attended at the mountain side, where the Japanese inscription was carved, and Americans attended at the shore side, where the English inscription was carved. After unveiling and offering of flowers were made, the representatives of both countries approached the memorial; upon meeting, they shook hands. The combined Japan-U.S. memorial service of the 50th anniversary of the battle was held in front of the monument in February 1995. Further memorial services have been held on later anniversaries.

The importance of the battle to Marines today is demonstrated in pilgrimages made to the island, and specifically the summit of Suribachi. Marines will often leave dog tags, rank insignia, or other tokens at the monuments in homage. Iwo Jima Day is observed annually on 19 February in the Commonwealth of Massachusetts with a ceremony at the State House.

The Japanese government continues to search for and retrieve the remains of Japanese military personnel who were killed during the battle.

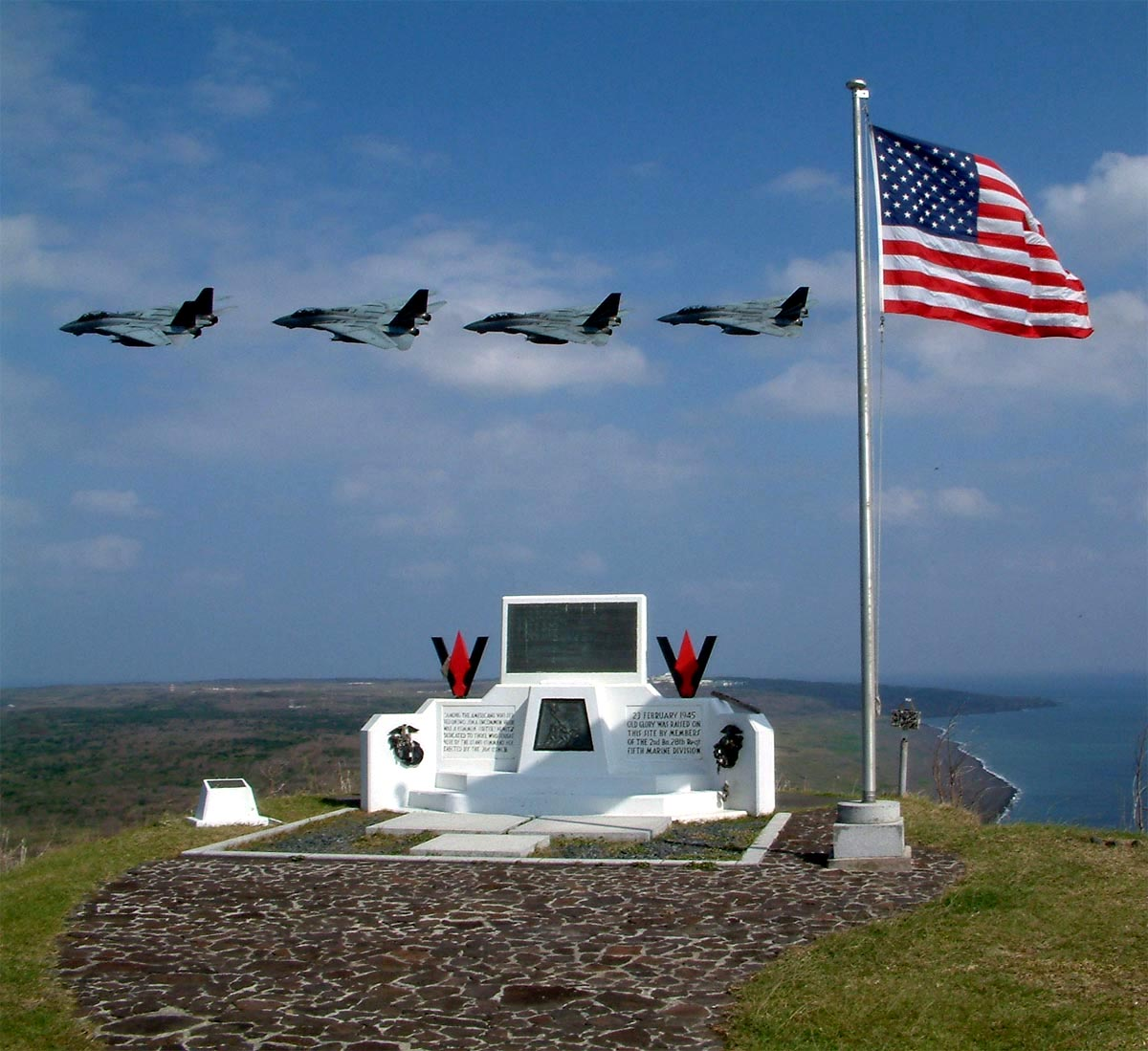
The memorial on top of Suribachi

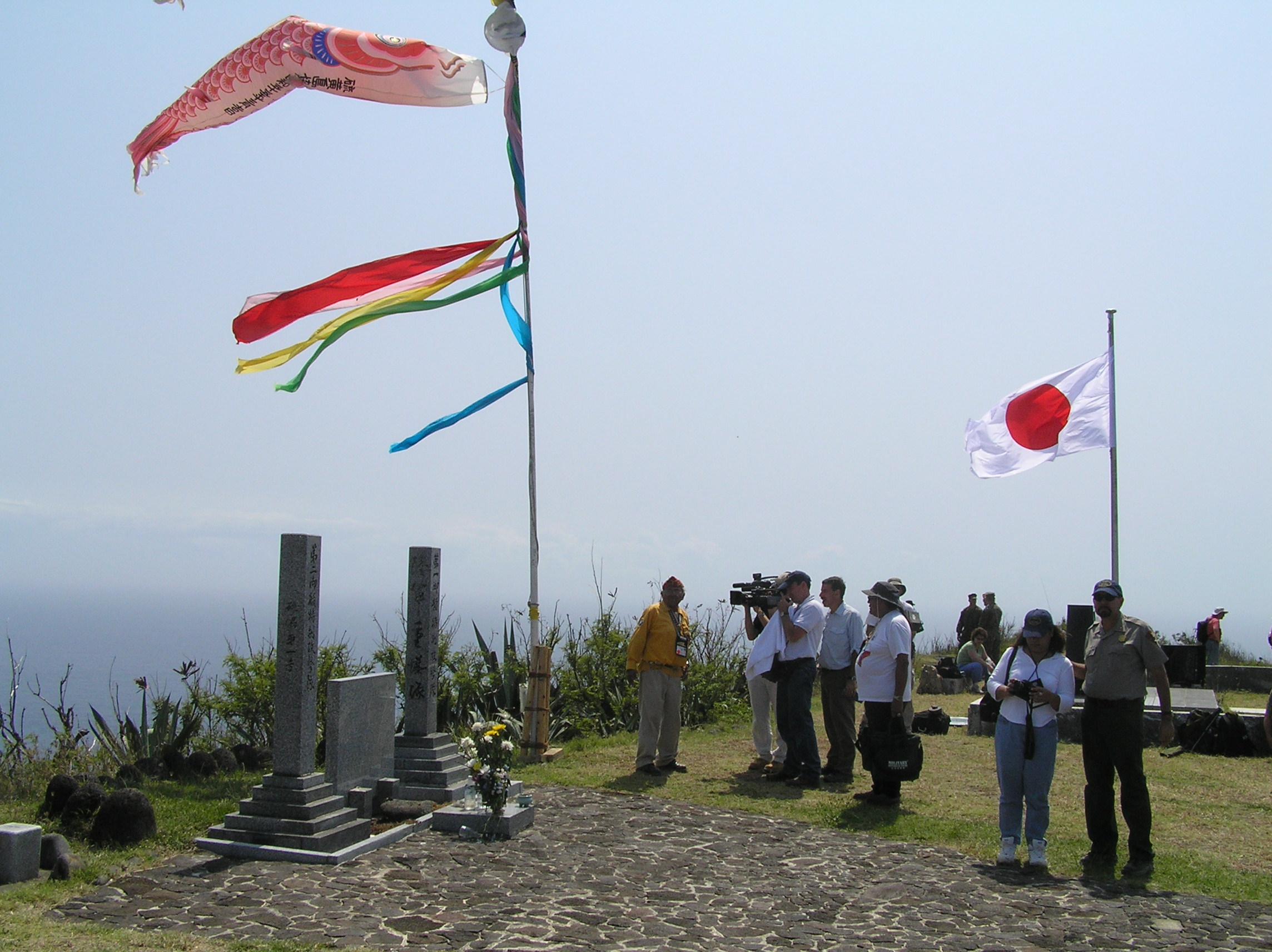
The 60th anniversary reunion at the Japanese part of the memorial

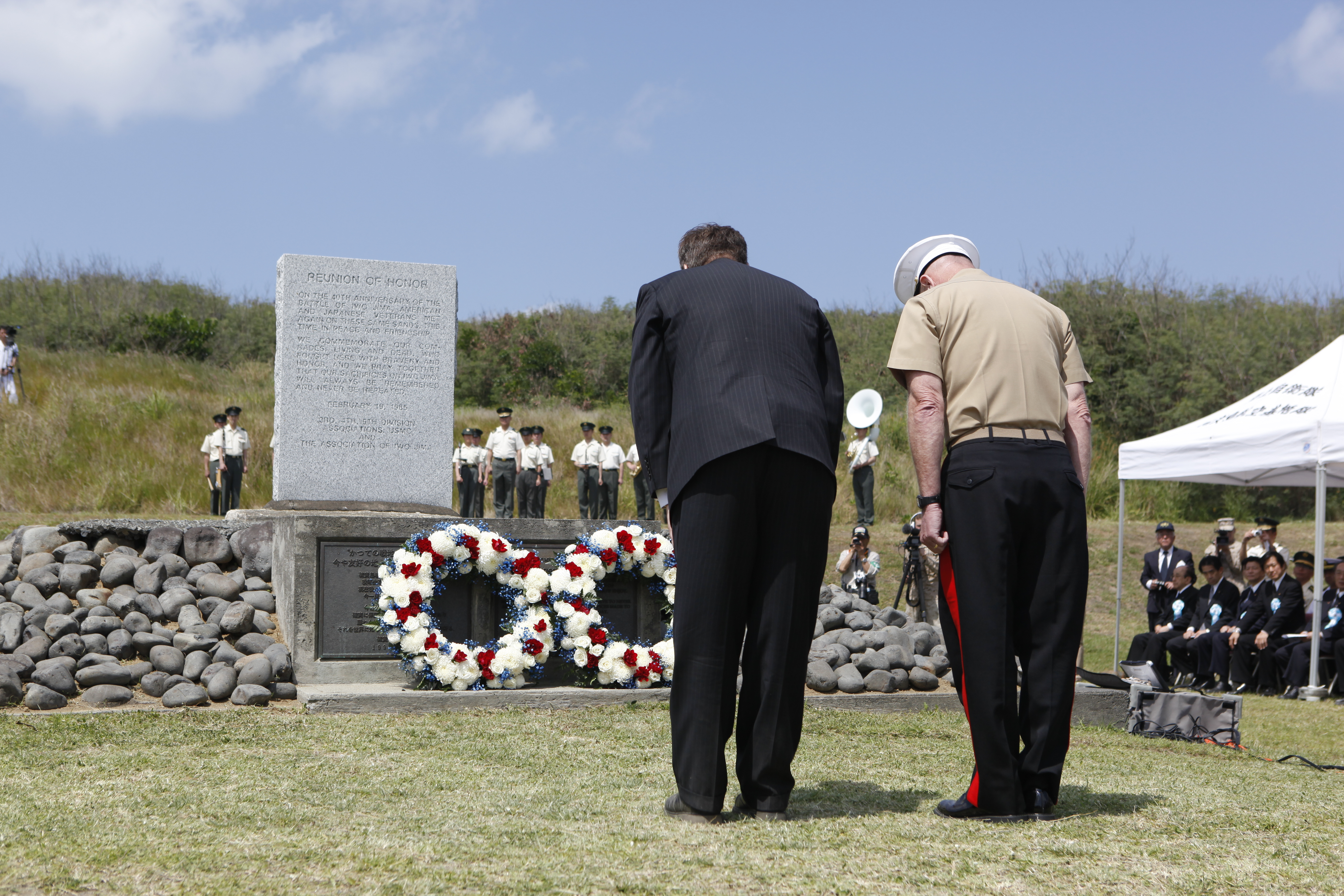
The 67th anniversary ceremony sponsored by the U.S. Marine Corps, the government of Japan, and the Iwo Jima Associations of America and Japan

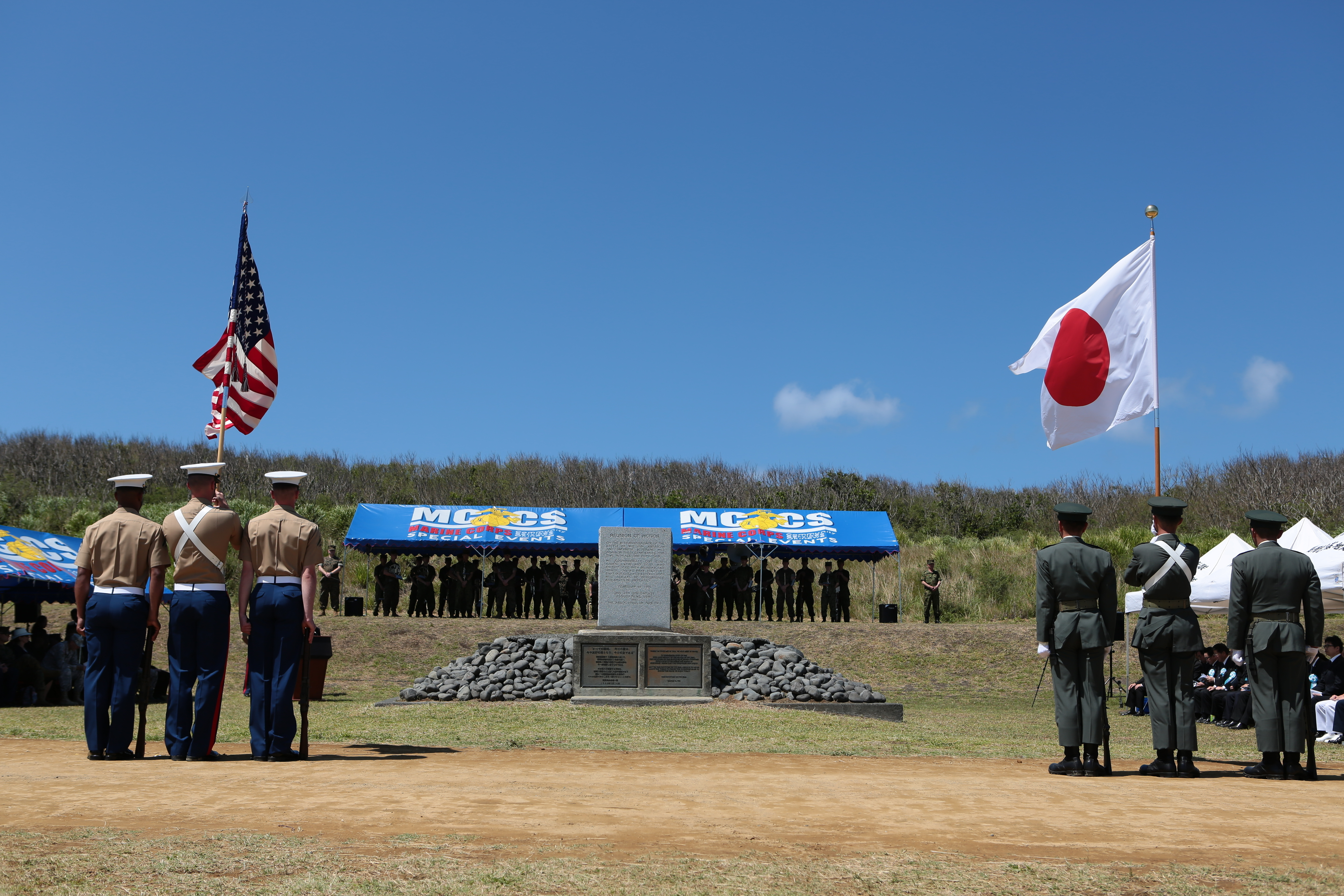
Commencement of the 71st commemoration of the anniversary

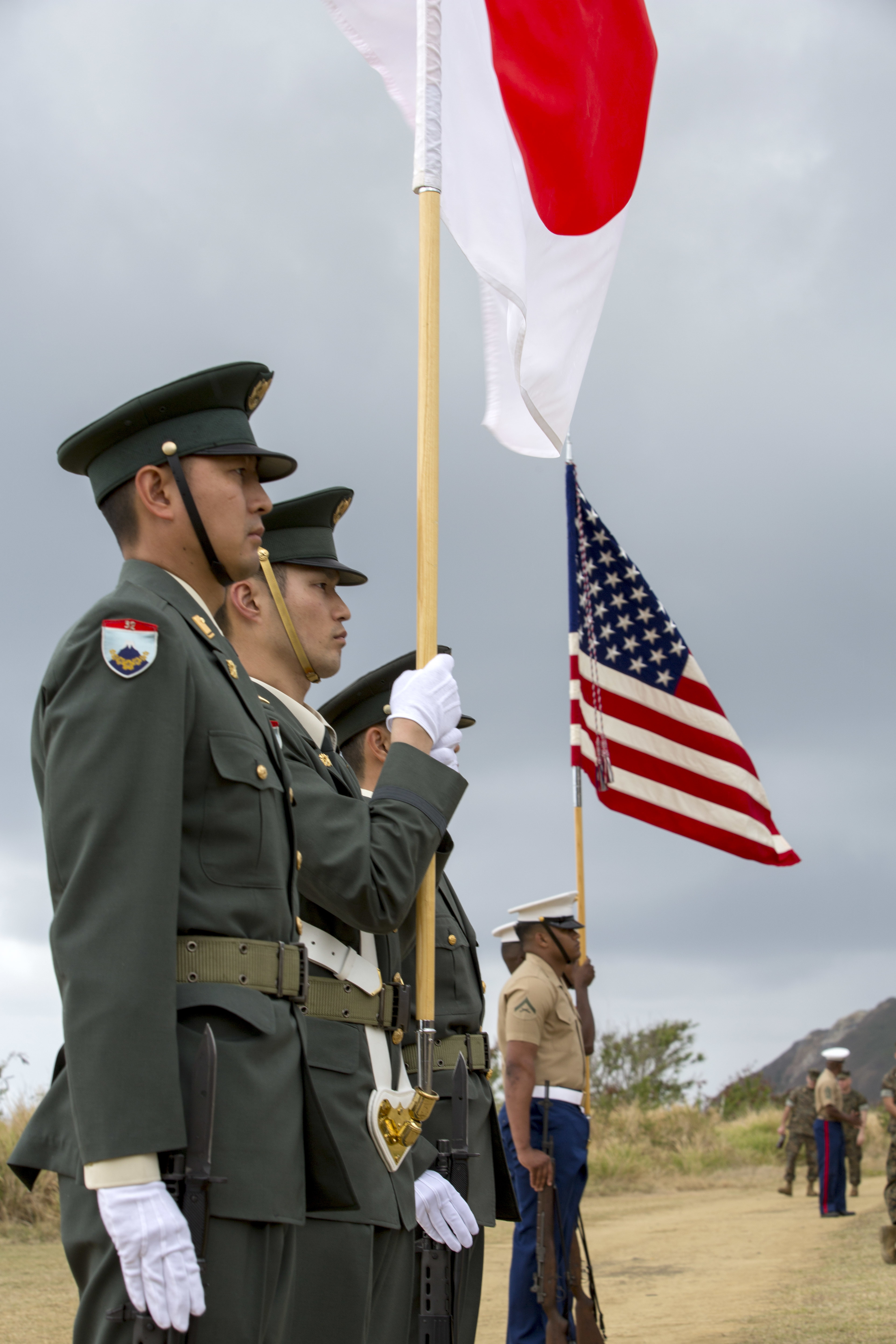
U.S. and Japanese color guard teams stand at attention during the 72nd Reunion of Honor ceremony.

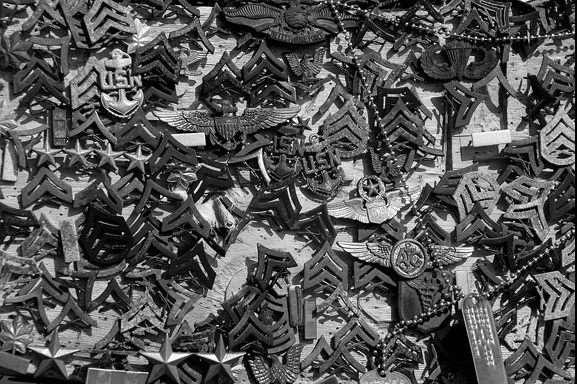
Insignia and other remembrances left by visitors on Mount Suribachi’s summit

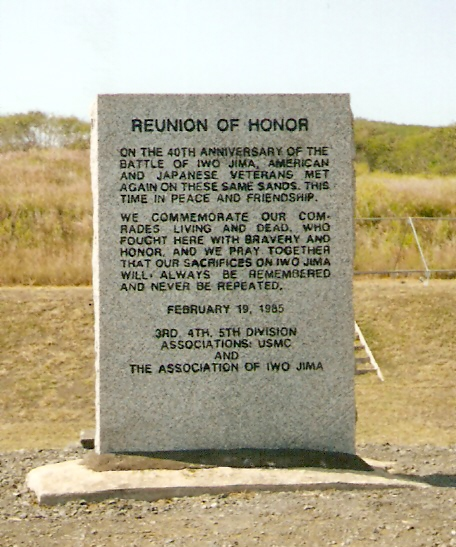
Reunion of Honor Memorial

== See also ==
- To the Shores of Iwo Jima (16 mm film)
- List of naval and land-based operations in the Pacific Theater during World War II
- Naval Base Iwo Jima
