= Naval Base Okinawa =

United States military facilities in Okinawa Island, Japan

Naval Base Okinawa Naval Facility Okinawa
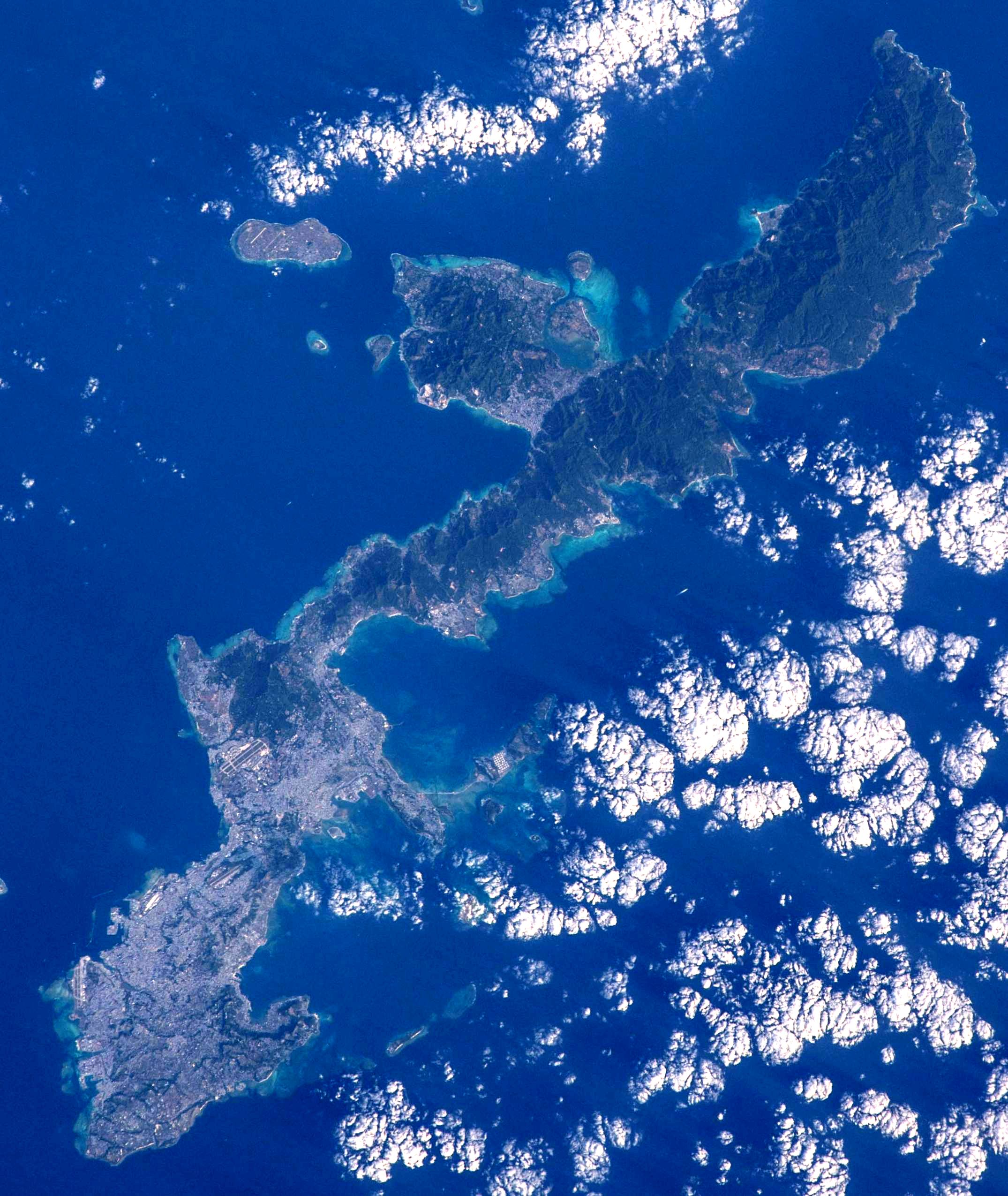
- Okinawa Island in 2015

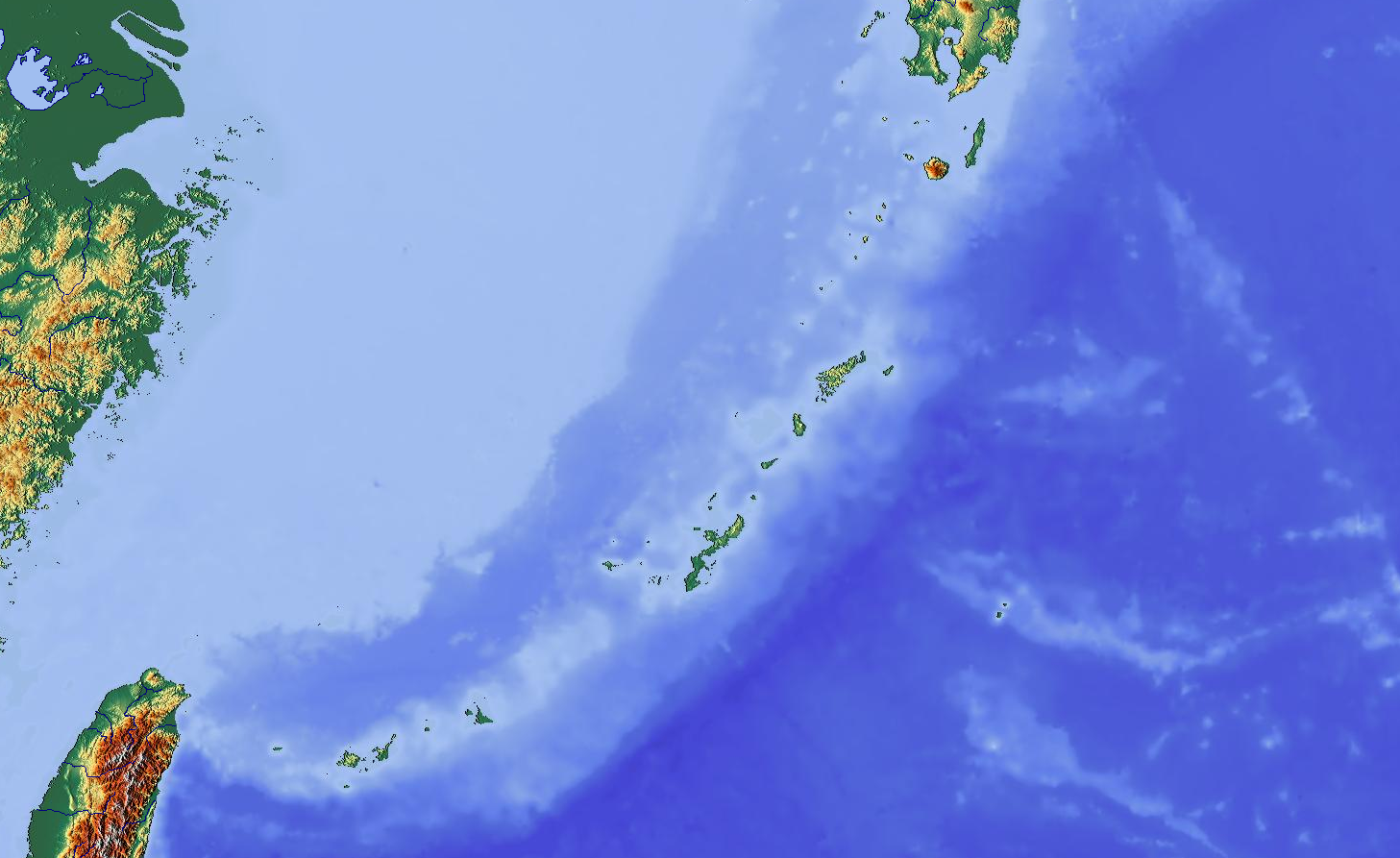
- Location within Ryukyu Islands Location within Asia

Geography
- Location: Pacific Ocean
- Coordinates: 26°28′46″N 127°55′40″E
- Archipelago: Ryukyu Islands
- Area: 1,199 km^{2} (463 sq mi) as of 1 October 2018
- Length: 106.6 km (66.24 mi)
- Width: 11.3 km (7.02 mi)
- Highest elevation: 503 m (1650 ft)
- Highest point: Mount Yonaha

Administration
- Japan
- Location: Okinawa Island
- Naval Base Administrative: United States Navy 1945–present (USMGR 1945–1950, USCAR 1950–1972)
- Founded after: Battle of Okinawa

Demographics
- Population: Peak of over 545,000 US Troops in 1945 (12,000 killed)

Naval Base Okinawa, now Naval Facility Okinawa, encompasses a number of bases built after the Battle of Okinawa by United States Navy on Okinawa Island, Japan. The naval bases were built to support the landings on Okinawa on April 1, 1945, and the troops fighting on Okinawa. The Navy repaired and did expansion of the airfields on Okinawa. United States Navy Seabees built or repaired the facilities on the island. The bases on Okinawa put the United States Armed Forces only 350 miles from Japan's home islands. Most facilities closed after the war, but some are still in use today by all branches of the United States Armed Forces.

58th Seabees building Katchin Hanto Seaplane Base. Seabees are installing Marston Mat for the Seaplane ramp

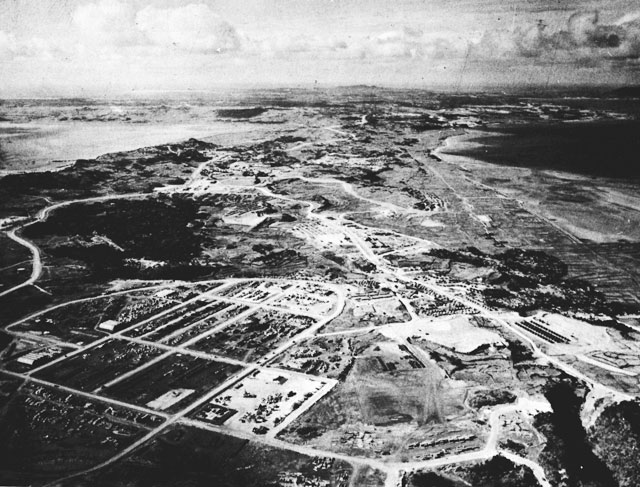
Katchin Hanto Peninsula in 1945. Looking west, with the Seabee construction advance base depot, supply depot and camp in the foreground

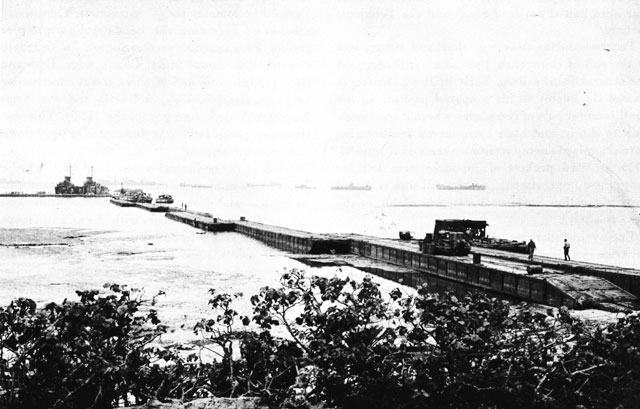
One of many pontoon causeways built by Navy Seabees at Okinawa in 1945 to get cargo to shores over coral reefs on the Okinawa Island

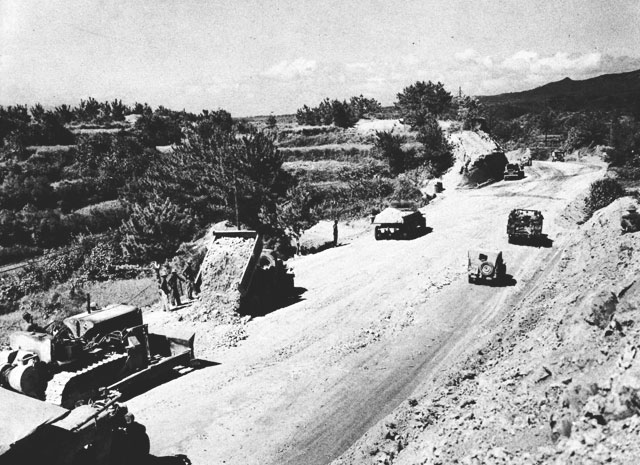
One of many road improvement projects by Seabees. Native roads were not wide enough or strong enough for the supply demands. New roads and highways were also built.

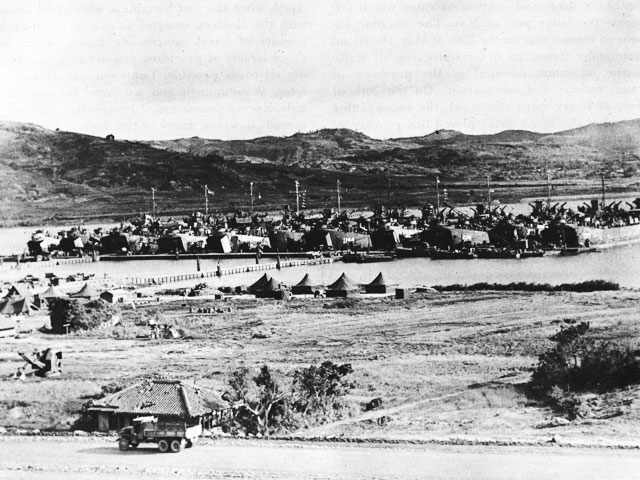
Pontoon causeway built by 21st Seabees to unload LSTs (Landing Ship, Tank)

== Construction history ==
Construction and improvements to captured facilities were given to Navy Seabee construction brigades 8th, 10th, 70th and 11th. The 1181st US Army Engineer construction joined in the construction projects. Some construction brigades came ashore during the landings as support combat engineers. As soon as the beaches were secured, the construction brigades began fixing and improving beach exit roads and bridges. Construction brigades were given the dangerous task of clearing land mines and demolitions. The other high priorities for the Construction brigades were fresh water and the repair and expansion of the airfields on Okinawa, once they were captured. Construction brigades worked in shifts around the clock, due to the high priorities of these tasks. Seabee 43rd Naval Construction Regiment landed with the troop on the east coast of Okinawa. The next Seabee landings were the 36th, 40th, and 87th Seabee Battalions in late April from Naval Base Saipan on LST ships. Seabees built their own loading zone for the heavy equipment needed for road work and runway repair and improvement. Heavy rains sometimes slowed and stop the work. Work on Yontan Airfield and Kadena Airfield started on April 3 and both were ready the next day by the efforts of 1901st Aviation Engineer Battalion and Seabee 624. The repaired runways were used by fighter aircraft and reconnaissance aircraft. Seabees added a tank farm for fuel storage. On April 28, Seabee started construction of new runway that could handle the needs of Bombers at Yontan Airfield. There were now 95,000 construction troops on Okinawa, improving and building facilities. Next repair and improvement started at Bolo Airfield and Yonabaru Airfield. When completed Yonabaru Airfield was 6,500 feet long. Due to poor drainage at Awase Airfield, the captured runway was abandoned, for later work. From June 15 to Awase Airfield completion on June 30, Seabees did massive earthwork project to drain and fill the Awase runway. Awase Airfield became a fighter aircraft base. Seabee 36th Battalion began building a new 5,000-foot fighter aircraft runway nearby to Awase starting on April 23. On May 6 Seabees of the 40th Battalion began the repair and improvement of the Chimu Airfield. On the Katsuren Peninsula at Katchin Hanto Seabees of the 7th Battalion started work on a seaplane base, that opened on July 1. Also at Katchin Hanto Seabees built a large supply depot. For unloading all the needed cargo harbor facilities at Katchin Hanto, Tengan and Baten Ko at Buckner Bay were built. At Tengan a breakwater and pier was built. A number of anchored pontoon piers and causeways were built to get over the coral reefs. Seabees used many tugboats and barges to get cargo ashore. Most ships could not get to pontoon causeways, so ships would unload into barges, barge cargo was then loaded into trucks. Additional piers and causeways were built at City of Kin on Chimu-Wan Bay, Awase, Machinato, Chimu Wan, Yonabaruand, City of Kuba Saki and Bisha Gawa. Unten Ko on Motobu Hanto and Chimu Wan became a supply depot with boat repair, naval mine depot. Each depot has an ammunition depot outside of the main depot. A ship repair depot was established at Baten Ko. Buckner Bay and Chimu Wan became massive supply depots. Port at Awase became an aircraft repair depot, with the docking of aircraft repair ships and Combat Aircraft Service Unit.

On June 1, 1945, the original Seabees Battalion were given a break as replacements arrived and took over unloading the massive amount of cargo still needed for operation. The new units were: Seabee 3rd, 4th, 11th, 12th, 23rd, 27th, and 36th Special Battalions, the Seabee 81st, 28th, and 148th Pontoon Battalions, and the Seabee 137th and 139th Trucking Battalions. June rain slowed the supply chain on muddy roads, priority cargo was unloaded first due to this slow down. Okinawa Island was declared secured on June 22, 1945. By July 1 supply chain problems were gone. Seabee also built the Third Amphibious Corps evacuation hospital at Yontan and Special Augmented Hospital 3, 4, 6 & 7. Seabee built degaussing station at Tsuken Shima, and a joint Headquarter communications center. All this work was interrupted from the landing to victory by air attacks, troops and Seabee were bombed, strafed and Kamikaze attacked on ships. On the ground, sniper fire, artillery, mortar fire, land mines and booby traps were a constant danger for work crews. Seabee repaired the remaining airfields at Ie Shima Airfield, Futema Airfield, Machinato Airfield and Tsuken Shima Airfield. By August, the troops peaked at 87,000 construction and engineering troops on Okinawa in 36 naval construction battalions, 21 Army engineer aviation battalions, 14 Army combat engineer battalions, and 7 Army engineer construction battalions.

== Post War ==
More than 12,000 US Troops died during the fighting on Okinawa. The Okinawa Bases were building up for the planned, more costly, invasion of Japan home island, called Operation Downfall. With the Surrender of Japan on September 2, 1945, the invasion was not needed. The Navy cleared naval mines around Okinawa waters in Operation Zebra. The Pentagon decided to keep Okinawa Bases as a Naval Advance Base. Seabee projects that were planned continued after the surrender of Japan. These projects included a full naval base at Baten Ko, camp for receiving troops at Kuba Saki, camp for outgoing troops, new ammunition depot, Fleet Hospital #116, a small naval base at Katchin Hanto, full aviation supply depot, making a deep harbor at Baten Ko, building a fleet recreation area at Tsuken Shima, and enlarging the naval supply depot at Tengan on Chimu Wan. On September 1, 1945, the agreement between the US Army engineer and the Seabee ended. Before this time both operated under a single command. This ended the largest ever joint construction force assembled. On October 9, 1945, the south part of Okinawa Island was hit by a typhoon, Typhoon Louise. Typhoon Louise did massive damage to the fleet post office at Baten Ko, departure camp, and Special Augmented Hospital No. 4, along with general damage across the southern bases. The typhoon did more damage to vessels than the air attacks.

At the end of construction in late 1945, The US Navy bases and facilities covered 20,000 acres. Construction crews had built for both the naval and army use: 4,180 feet of wharves, 712,000 square feet of storage depot buildings, 193,000 cubic feet of refrigerated storage and 11,778,000 square feet of open storage. Seabee had built tank farms holding: 8,820,000 gallons of aviation gasoline, 30,000 barrels of Diesel fuel, 50,000 barrels of fuel oil. Always built outside of camp and other depots Seabee built 13,000 square feet for ammunition storage. At the airfields, 324,100 square feet of buildings were built for aviation repair shops and 91,000 square feet for general repair shops. The Hospitals took up 338,000 square feet. For the troops, 4,755,000 square feet of barracks were built. The US Navy's share of the space was: 16,700 square feet of supply depot and 7,475 cubic feet of refrigerated storage, and 4,500 square feet of open storage, 2,400 square feet of hospital and 67,692 square feet of barracks. The Seabee had a 5,500 square feet repair shops.

Japanese prisoner of war camps were built to house the 11,250 Imperial Japanese Army troops that surrendered between April and July 1945. The 11,250 Troops, which included 3,581 unarmed laborers, made up 12 percent Troops Japan had placed on the island. Some of the Troops that surrendered were home guard personnel called Boeitai. The camps held the POWs until repatriation to the Japanese homeland on US Navy ships.

United States Military Government of the Ryukyu Islands was set up during the battle in 1945 for Administrative control. In 1950, United States Civil Administration of the Ryukyu Islands was set up Administrative control. In 1972, Administrative control was returned to Japan.

United States Forces Japan was founded in 1957 for the defense of Japan.

Naval Forces Japan (United States) was founded in 1962 and has control over all United States Navy shore installations in Japan.

Japanese governments has allowed US bases on Okinawa in exchange for a US commitment to defend Japan from external attacks, called The U.S.-Japan Security Alliance.

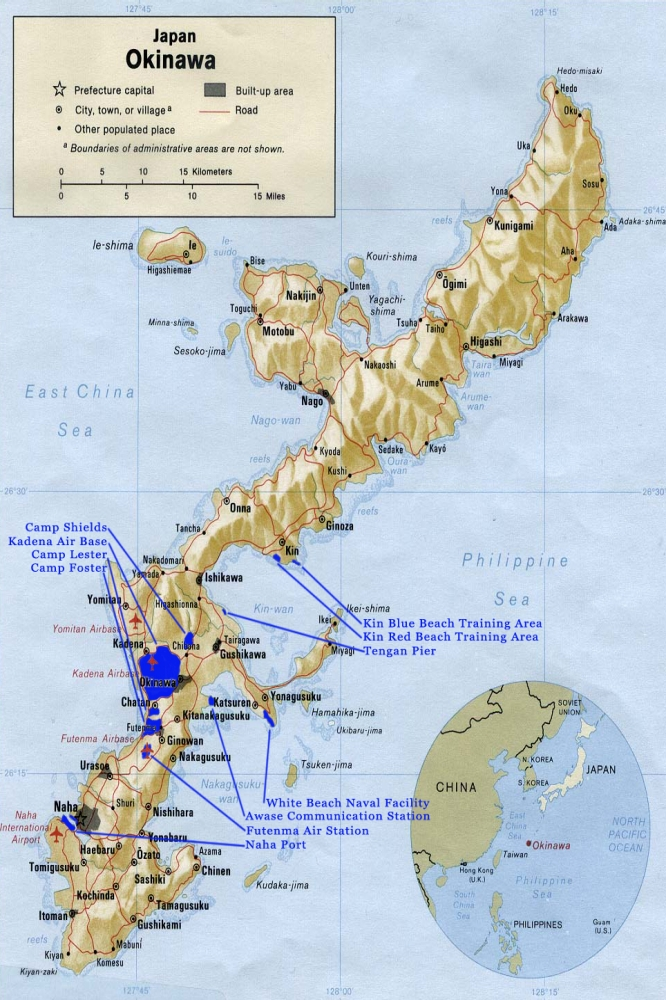
Map Commander, US Fleet Activities Okinawa (CFAO)

=== Current Navy use ===
Naval Facility Okinawa

- Navy Medicine Readiness and Training Command Okinawa
- United States Naval Hospital Okinawa
- Camp Courtney near Kadena Air Base
- Tengan Pier
- Northern Training Area, part of United States Forces Japan, used by all branches, including the US Navy.
- Kin Blue Beach Training Area
- Kin Red Beach Training Area
- Henoko Navy Ammunition Dump
- Camp Shields
- Camp Lester (Camp Kuwea) (base hospital)
- Camp Foster Marine Corps and US Navy
- Awase Communication Site
- White Beach Naval Facility on Katsuren peninsula
- Marine Corps Air Station Futenma, US Navy operates from Air Station also.
- Parts of Kadena Air Force Base
- Some waters off the coast of Okinawa are reserved for use by US Navy and other branches.
- Naval Facility Okinawa Units:
  - 76th Task Force
  - Battalion for Mobile Construction
  - Communication Detachment
  - Command for Military Sealift / Air Pacific Repair unit
  - Temporary units posted at Okinawa

== Bases and facilities ==
Built at Okinawa:

- Naha Port Facility US Navy, Naval Headquarters, radar, depot, communication, (1945–present), now US Army
- Teguchi Harbor, PT Boat base, Squadrons 31, 32, and 37
- Awase port, repair base
- Fleet anchorage
- Shonawan Harbor PT Boat base, NPTB 25
- Kuba Saki, pier and supply depot
- Chimu Wan, section base and suplly depot
- Unten Ko, on Motobu Peninsula, port
- Bisha Gawa, pier, supply depot
- Tsuken Island, degaussing station. fleet recreation, pontoon pier (later training center)
- Nakagusuku Bay - Buckner Bay, naval base, depot
- Yomitan hospital
- Katchin Hanto, pier, seaplane base, hospital, supply depot
- Chimu and Naval Base, repair (1945–1946)
- Ie Shima fleet port off airfield
- USS Comfort (AH-6) hospital ship, was off shore to receive wound troops
- Fleet Post Office
- Rock and coral quarry
- Power stations
- Tank farms for: Fuel oil, aviation fuel, diesel fuel, gasoline
- AA gun emplacements
- Navy Communication Center
- Seabee depots
- Aircraft hangars
- Mess halls - quonsets
- Navy Carrier Aircraft Service Unit (CASU) camp and depot
- Water supply system, with tanks
- Ammunition depots
- Quartermaster depots
- Medical centers
- Engineering camp
- Chemical Engineering Camp
- Crash boat base
- Camp McTureous, Marine Corps, some Navy use
- Marine Corps Base Camp Smedley D. Butler some Navy use
- Camp Gonsalves, Marine Corps, some Navy use
- Camp Schwab, Marine Corps, some Navy use
- Camp Kinser, Marine Corps, some Navy use
- Fleet Post Office FPO# 3256 SF Okinawa Jima, Ryukyu Retto, Japan
- Fleet Post Office FPO# 1170 SF Katchin Hanto, Okinawa
- Fleet Post Office FPO# 1171 SF Motobu Peninsula, Okinawa
- Fleet Post Office FPO# 1172 SF Bishi Gawa, Okinawa
- Fleet Post Office FPO# 1173 SF Chimu Wan, Okinawa
- Fleet Post Office FPO# 1174 SF Awase, Okinawa
- Fleet Post Office FPO# 1175 SF Yonabaru, Okinawa

== Repair bases ==
Naval Base Okinawa became a major repair base, ships and other equipment had been fighting in the war for some time, or damaged in kamikaze attacks and were in need of repair. In addition to the land-based repair shops and depots, repair ships worked at Okinawa. Aircraft repair ship, repair ship and floating docks were used to do maintenance, some based at Kerama Islands:

- AFD 13, a Auxiliary floating drydock, lost in Typhoon, good parts removed for depot stock.
- AFD 14, Aux floating drydock, damaged in Typhoon
- AFDL 32, Aux floating drydock, lost in Typhoon, good part removed.
- ARD 21, Auxiliary Repair Dock, damaged in Typhoon repaired
- ARD 22, Auxiliary Repair Dock, damaged in Typhoon repaired
- ARD 29, Auxiliary Repair Dock, damaged in Typhoon repaired
- USS Nestor (ARB-6), repair ship, damaged in Typhoon not repaired
- USS Sarpedon (ARB-7), a repair ship, damaged in Typhoon repaired
- USS Mona Island (ARG-9), a repair ship, damaged in Typhoon repaired
- USS Extricate (ARS-16), rescue and salvage ship, damaged in Typhoon repaired
- USS Aventinus aircraft repair ship, damaged in Typhoon
- USS Fabius aircraft repair ship, damaged in Typhoon

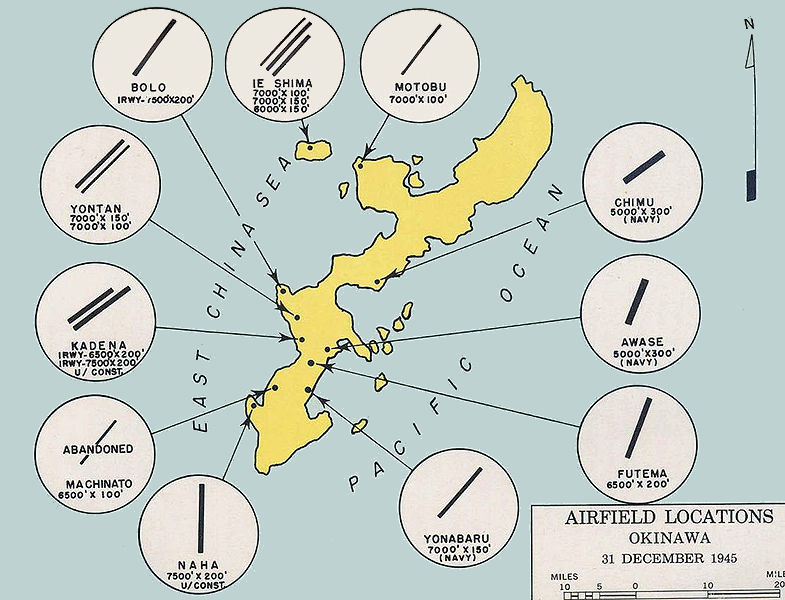
Okinawa airfields in 1945

== Airfields ==
Construction crews, both Navy and Army improved the airfields on the island. After Seabee construction, four airstrips were turned over to the US Army. But were used by Naval Air Transport Service and Navy patrol planes also.

- Naha Air Base Naval Headquarters (Navy 1945–1952) (USAF 1954–1971)
- Yomitan Auxiliary Airfield, (1945–1996) three runways, joint Airfield Navy, Army, Marine Corps
- Kadena airfield, (Naval Air Facility Kadena 1975–1992, now Camp Shields) Improved and used for USAAF bombers (1945 – present as Kadena Air Base)
- Ie Shima Airfield built on a small island, post for training only (1945–present)
    - Iejima Airport Auxiliary to Ie Shima Airfield, now civil airport.
- Tsuken Shima airfield on small Tsuken Island (1945–1946)
- Machinato Airfield, became Camp Kinser Marine Corps post war (1945–present)
- Yonabaru Airfield US Navy patrol base (active 1945–1947)
- Motobu Airfield (Operated by Navy and Army) (1945) abandoned after war is now a road.
- Chimu Airfield (1945–1946), then Camp Hansen United States Marine Corps camp (1965–present)
    - Chimu Seaplane Base (July 1945 – 1946)
- Awase Airfield (1945–1950) For United States Marine Corps fighters, US Air Force (1950–1977), site is now housing
- Bolo Airfield, 78 and 87 Seabee camp, opened too late for war, used as a storage depot (1945–1972)
- Futenma airfield, became Marine Corps Air Station Futenma, also used by Navy
- Miyako Airfield on Miyako Island (1945–1946), now Miyako Airport
- Itazuke Auxiliary Airfield, (1945–1972) now Fukuoka Airport
- Kerama Retto Seaplane Base, unit VH-3 with Martin PBM Mariner air & sea rescue

== Okinawa supplies ==
Both US Navy and World War II United States Merchant Navy ships unload massive amounts of cargo and fuel needed to build and operate the Okinawa Bases. SS Canada Victory, SS Hobbs Victory, SS Logan Victory each an ammunition ship, were attacked and sank with an explosion after kamikaze attack in 1945 at Okinawa. The loss of the three Victory ships, each sunk by a kamikaze attack severely hurt the combat forces on Okinawa. The ships were carrying a total of 24,000 tons (54 million pounds) of ammunition; including most of the 81 mm mortar shells needed for the troops. The Victory ships were some of 47 ships sunk by kamikaze attack during World War II. The ammunition ship SS Saginaw Victory arrived April 12, 1945, at Okinawa to replace the ammunition lost on the ships. More ammunition ships were not needed, as the war came to an end without the invasion of Japan. The SS Sharon Victory delivered C-rations to the troops on Okinawa, during unloading came under attack. Sharon Victory fought off a Japanese kamikaze plane attacking the ship.

== Monuments ==
- Buckner Monument on Itoman (Ichuman)
- Cornerstone of Peace, Peace of Peace Memorial Park at Itoman at 26.095184°N 127.725742°E
- Okinawa Prefectural Peace Memorial Museum
- Okinawa Peace Hall at 26.097576°N 127.723610°E
- Cemetery & National War Dead Peace Mausoleum, Mabuni Hill, (Mabuni no Oka)
- Monument of Kai to people from Yamanashi died on Okinawa located in Yaese.
- Easley Monument, Memorial monument of Brigadier General Claudius M. Easley of the 96th Infantry Division of the US Army at Okinawa, his KIA place at 26.114649°N 127.680332°E
- May Monument, On June 5, 1945, U.S. Army Col. Edwin T. May was Killed In Action (KIA) at the spot of the marker
- Kyan Memorial (Kyan Misaki Enchi), Large black marble monument notes where civilians jumped to their death off cliffs during the battle.
- Himeyuri Peace Museum and Himeyuri Monument-1.jpg|Himeyuri Monument (Himeyuri No To)
- Konpaku Memorial Tower, Konpaku No To (Japanese monument, Mass Grave Site) at 26.085897°N 127.085897°E
- 96th Infantry Division Memorials
- Marker April 1, 1945 invasion beaches of Minatoga (Minatogawa) located on the southeast of Okinawa.

== Gallery ==
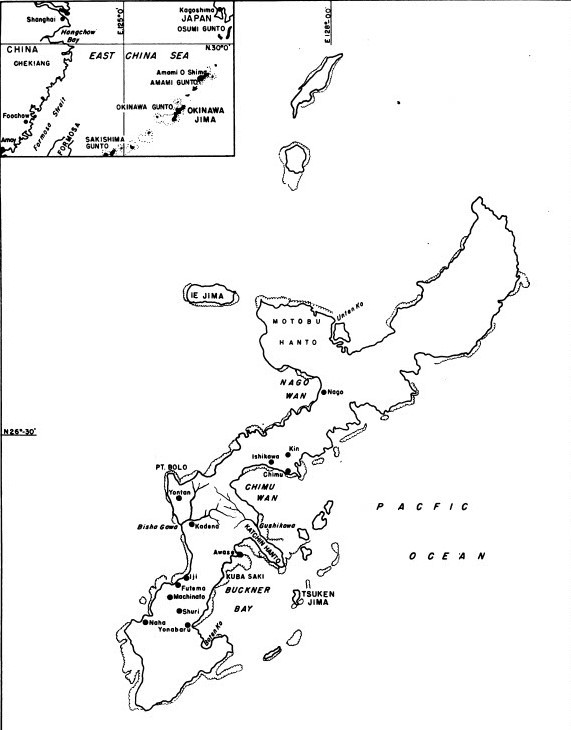
Map of Okinawa

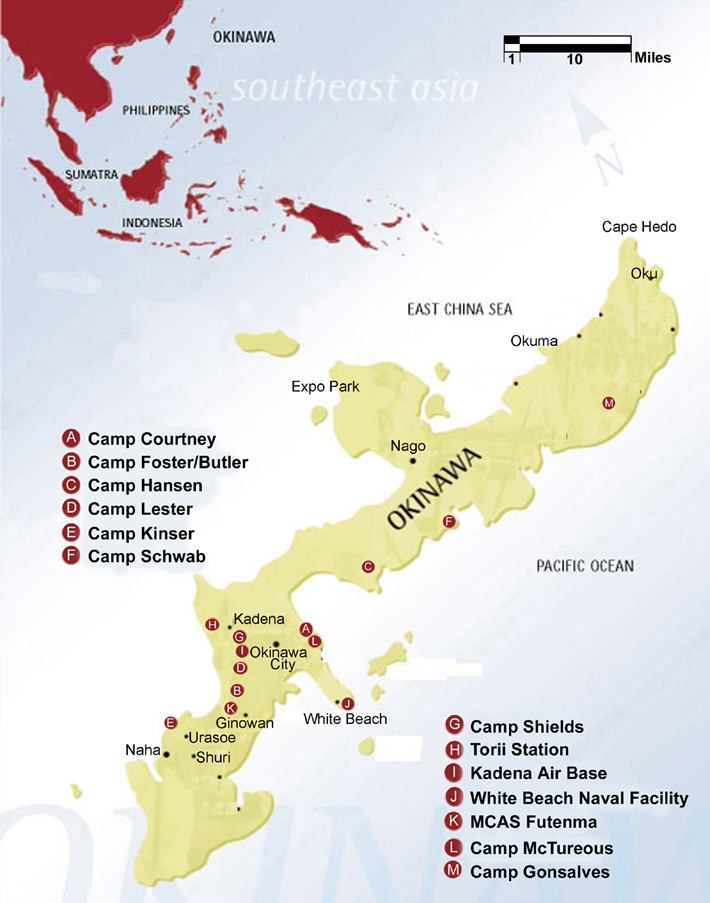
Map Okinawa US Bases

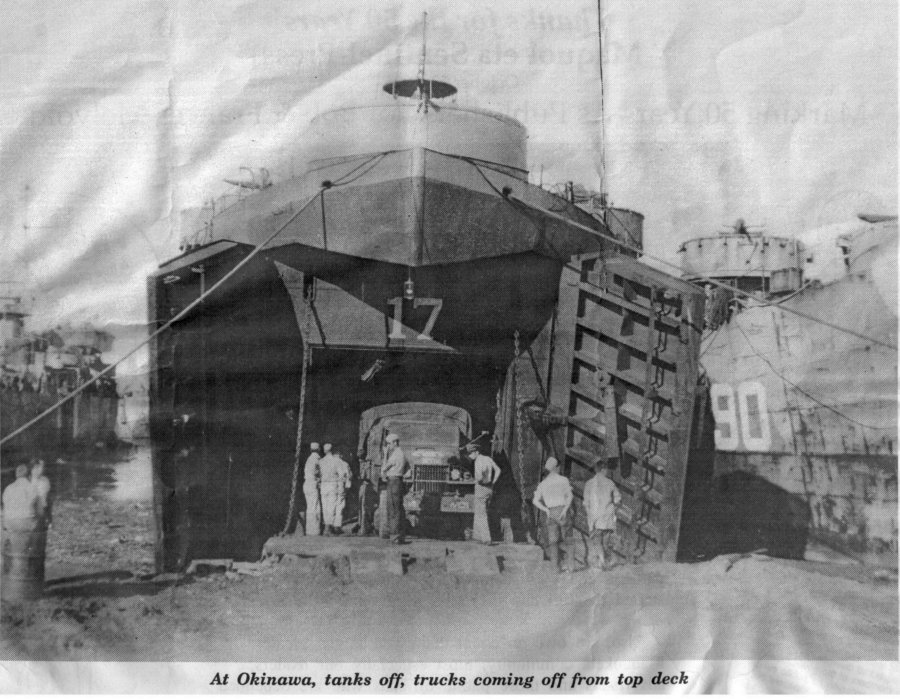
USS LST-17 unloading at Okinawa

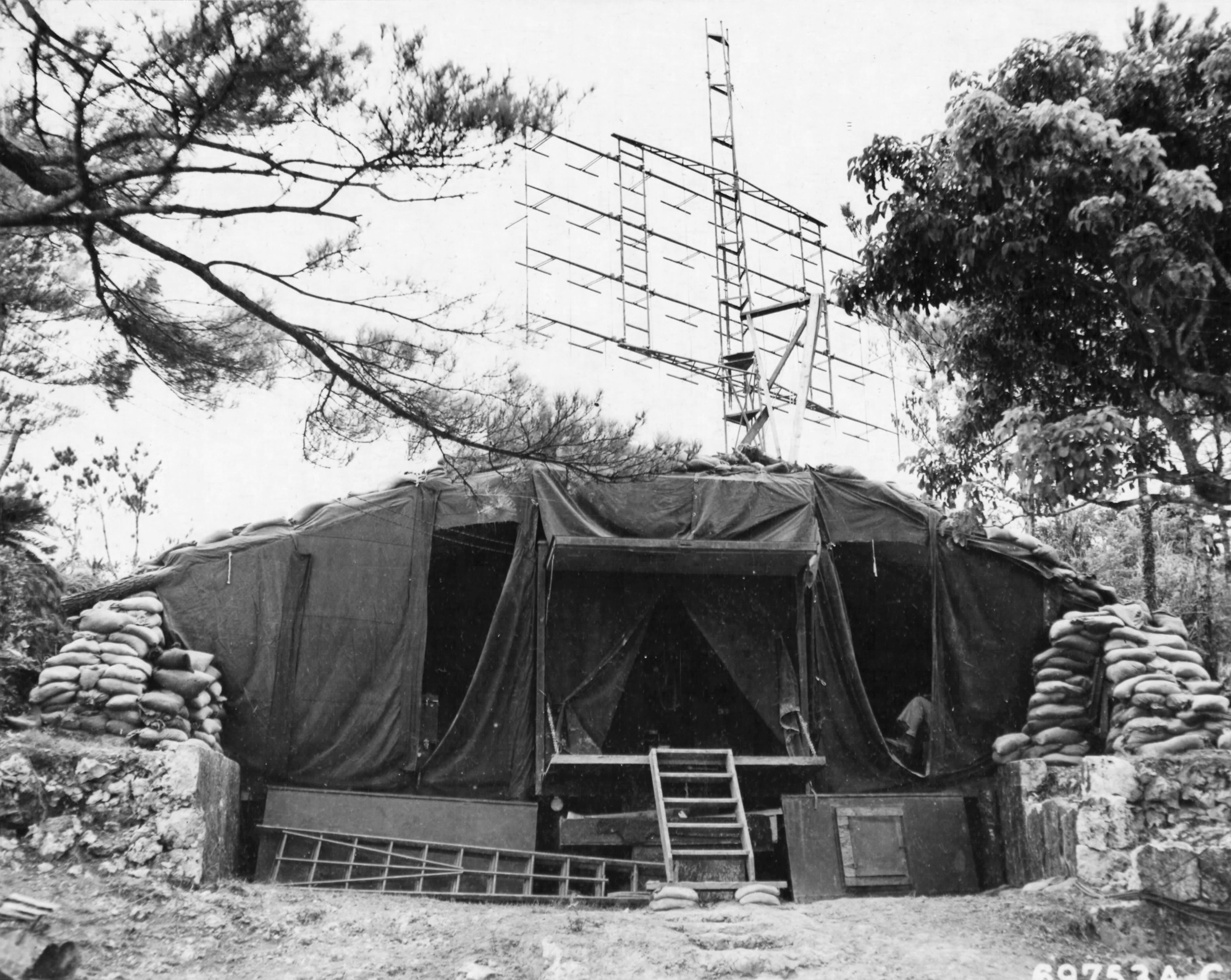
Air Warning Squadron 6 on Okinawa

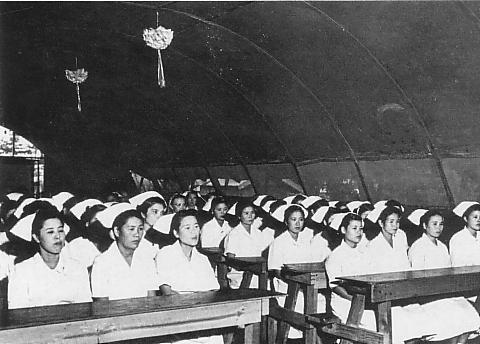
Nurses at Okinawa Central Hospital Nursing School in 1946

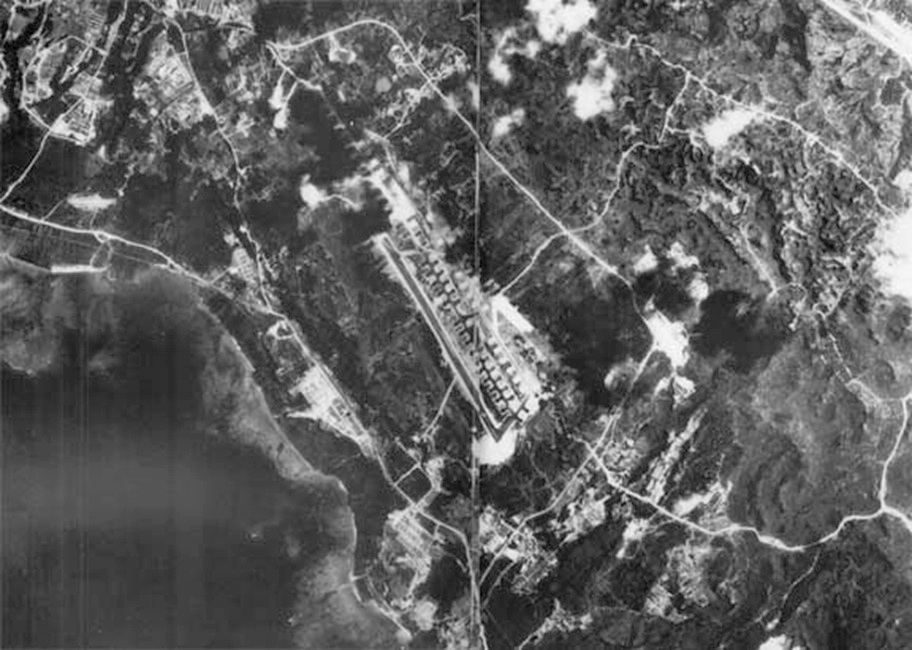
Futenma Air Base in Okinawa, Japan 1945

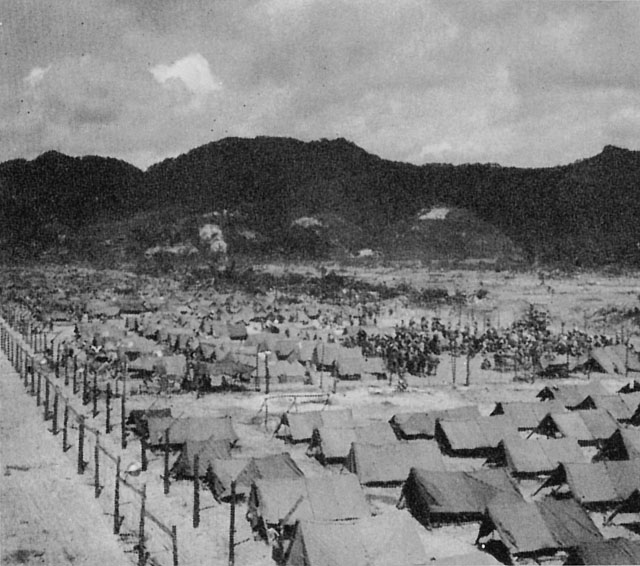
Camp for thousands of Japanese troops who surrendered on Okinawa in 1945

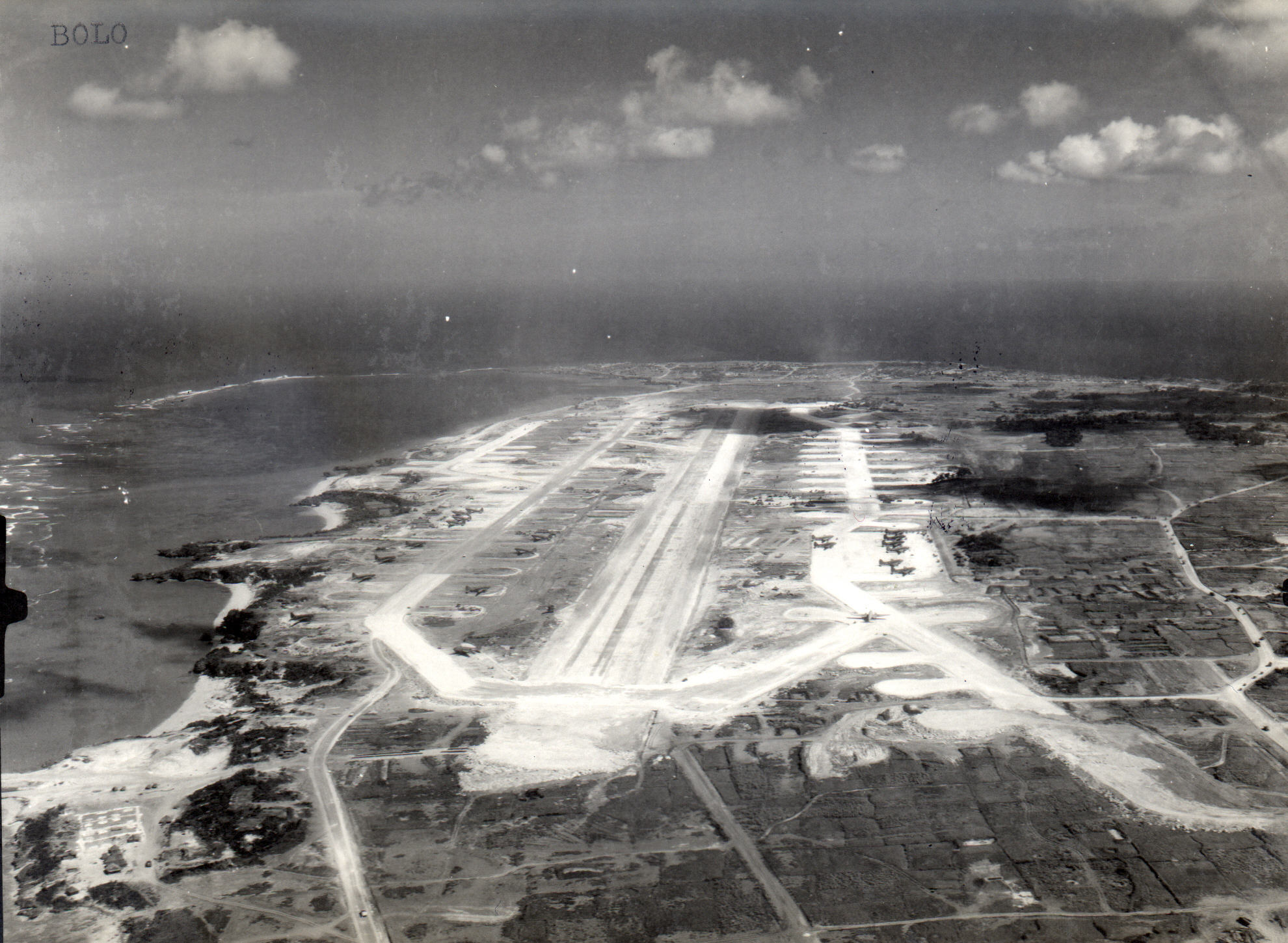
Bolo airfield

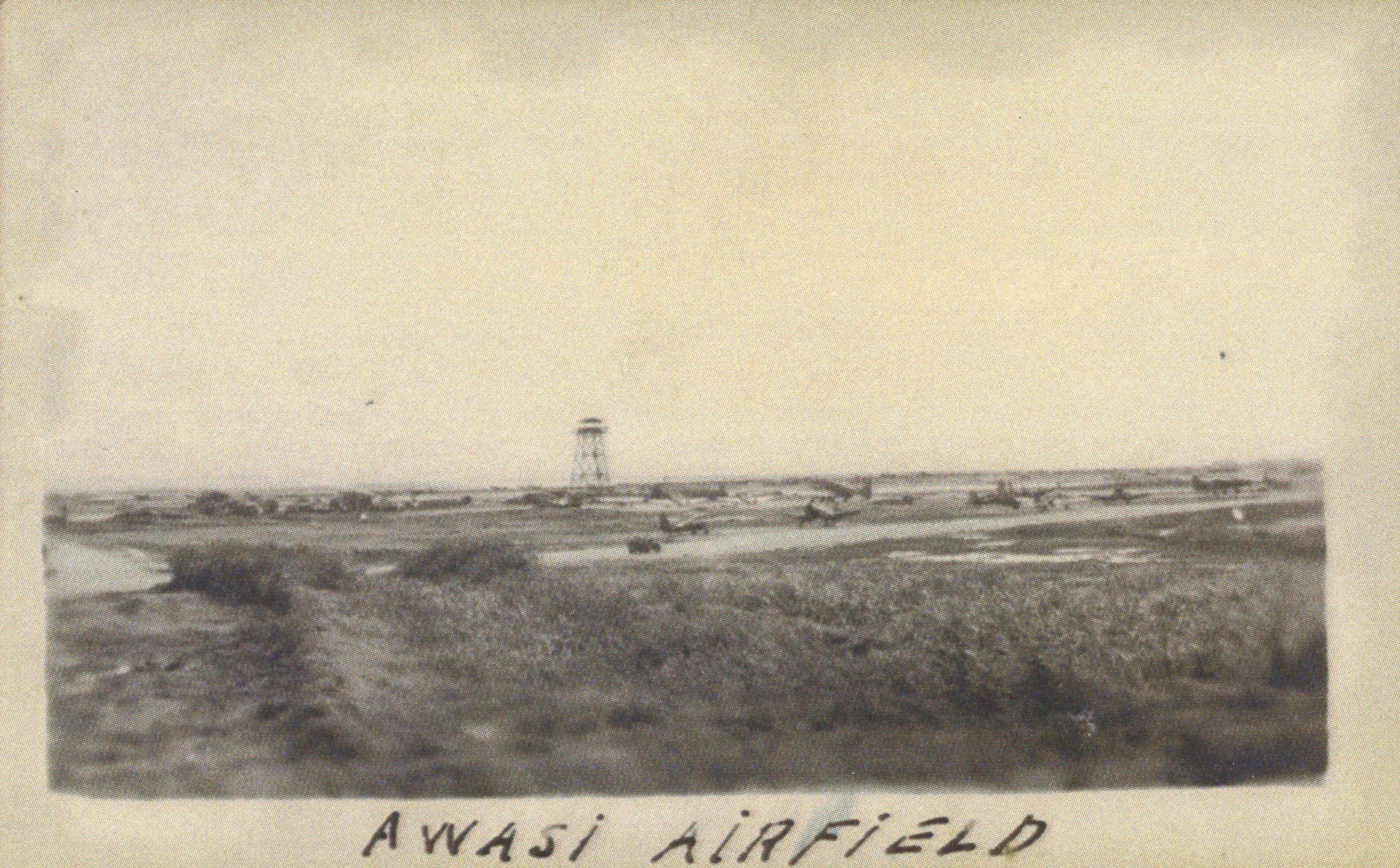
Awase Airfield

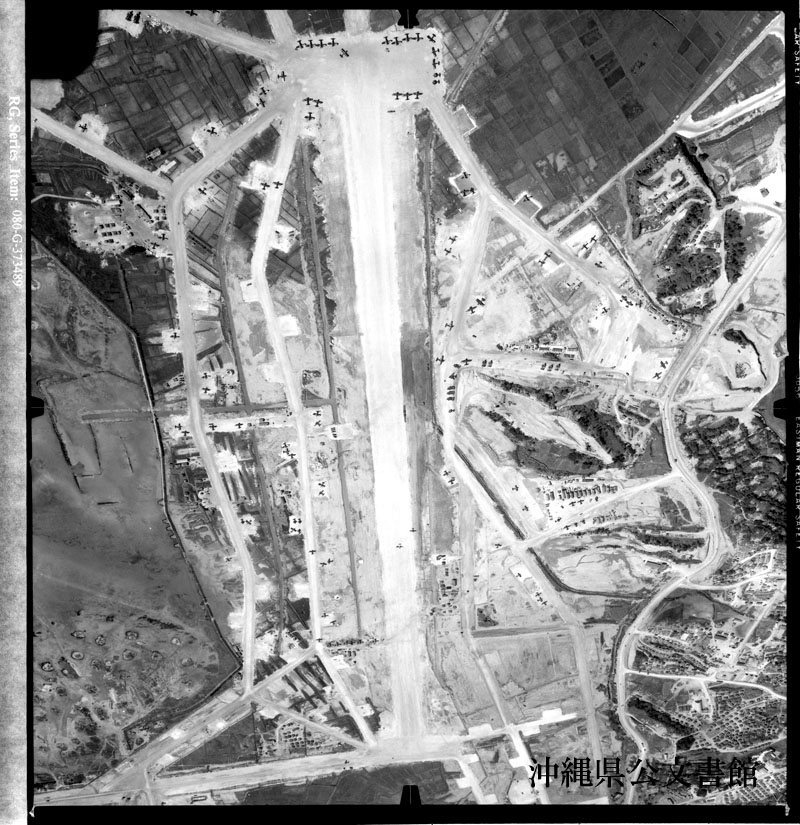
Awase airfield

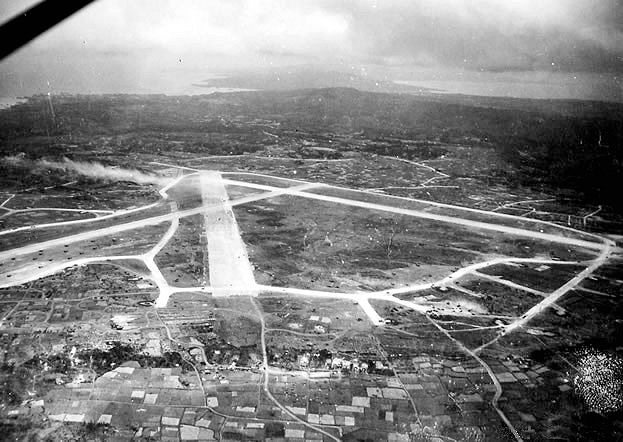
Yontan Airfield

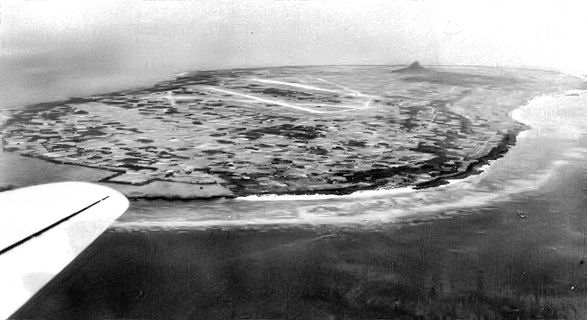
Ieshima in 1945

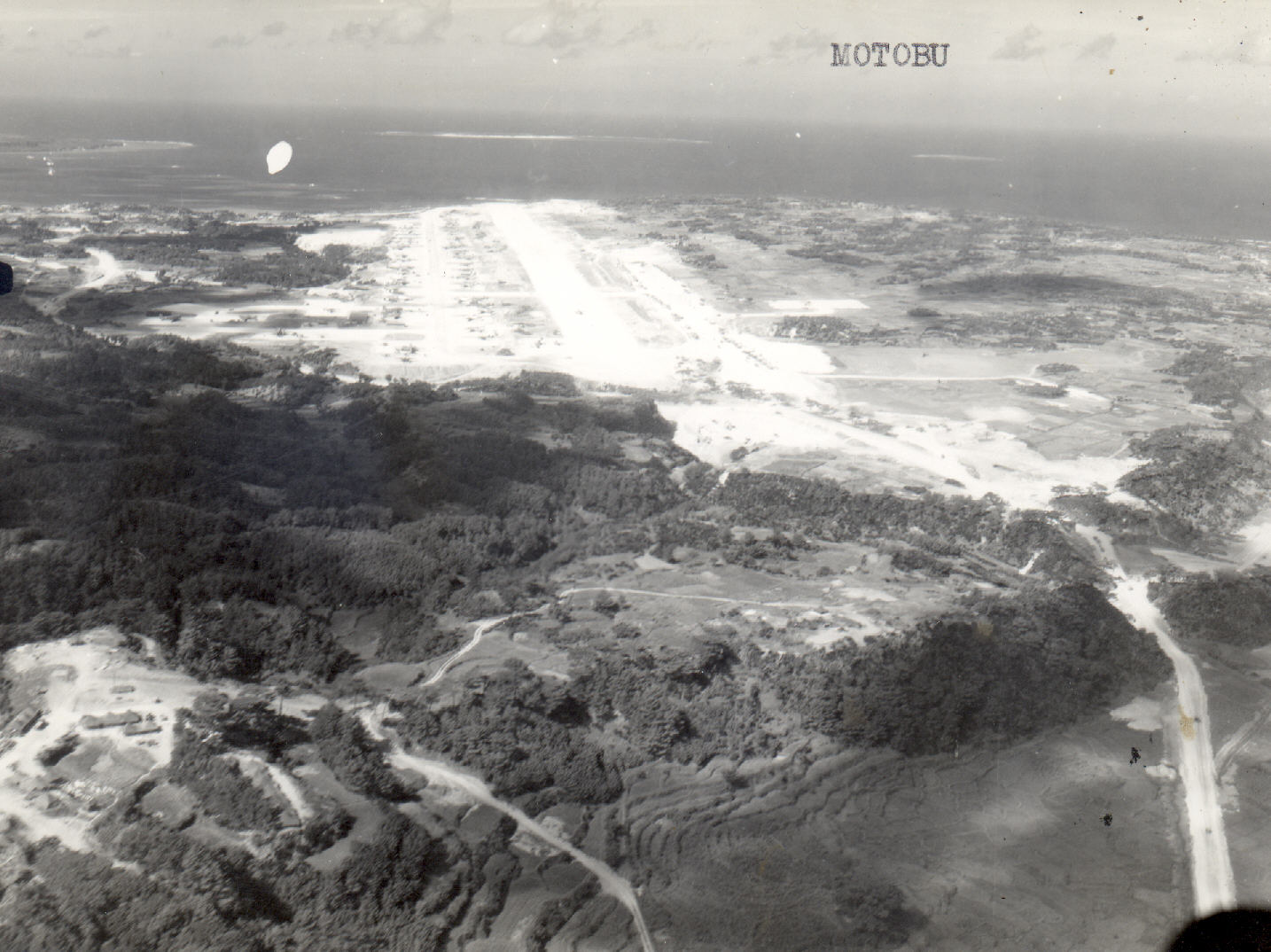
Motobu Airfield

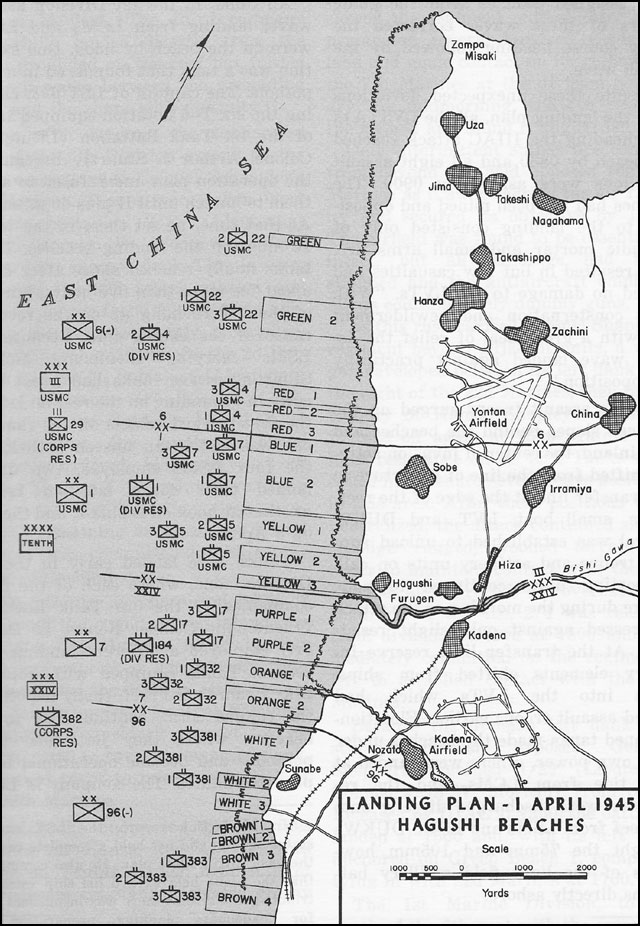
Map with Yontan Airfield and Kadena Airfield

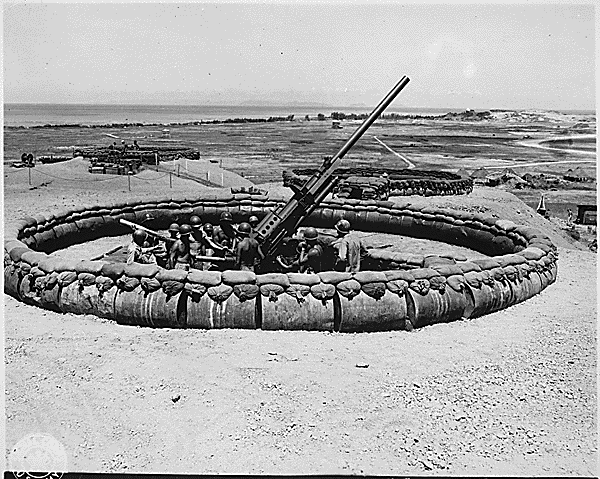
90mm AA gun on Okinawa base

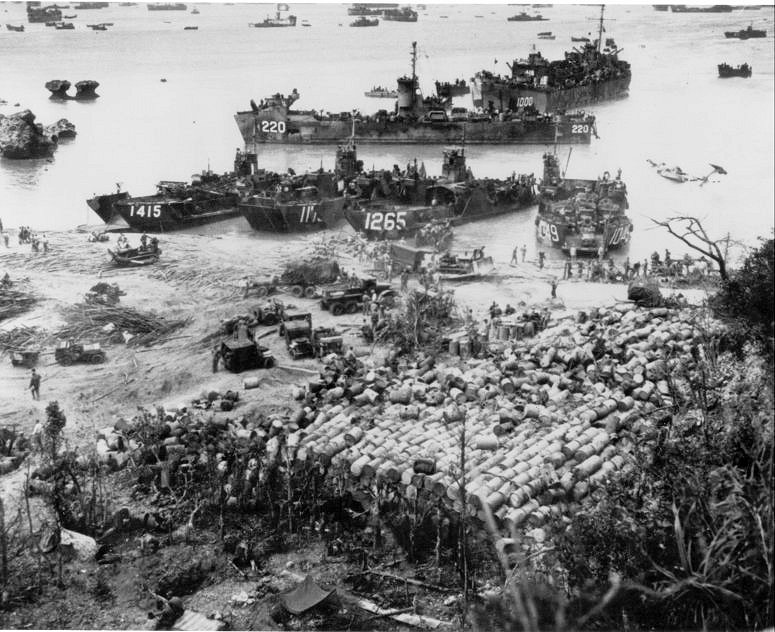
USS LST-1000 and beach with cargo

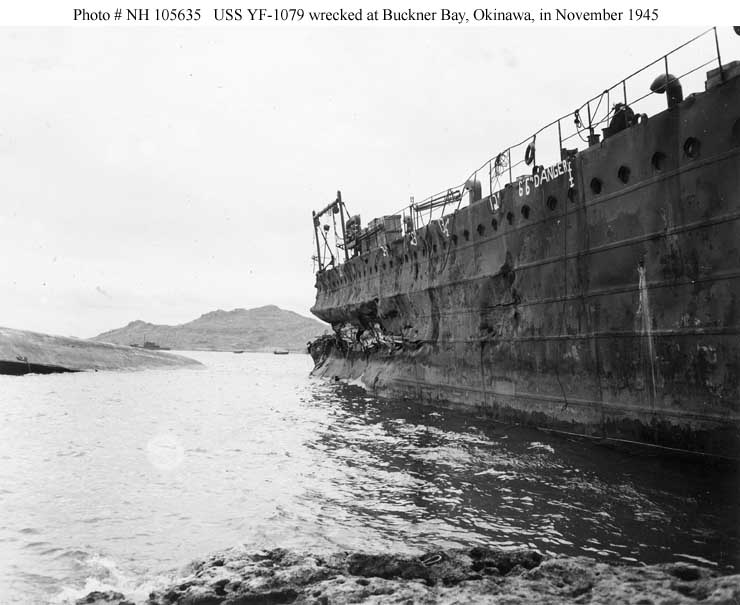
Barge YF-1079 in Buckner Bay, damaged in Typhoon

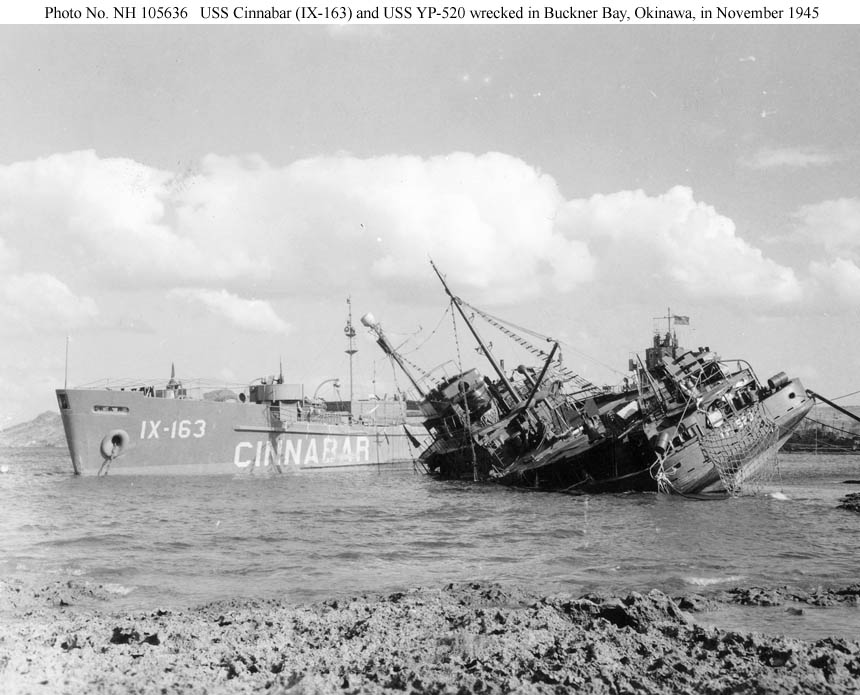
USS Cinnabar (IX-163) and USSYP-520 damaged in Typhoon, in Buckner Bay

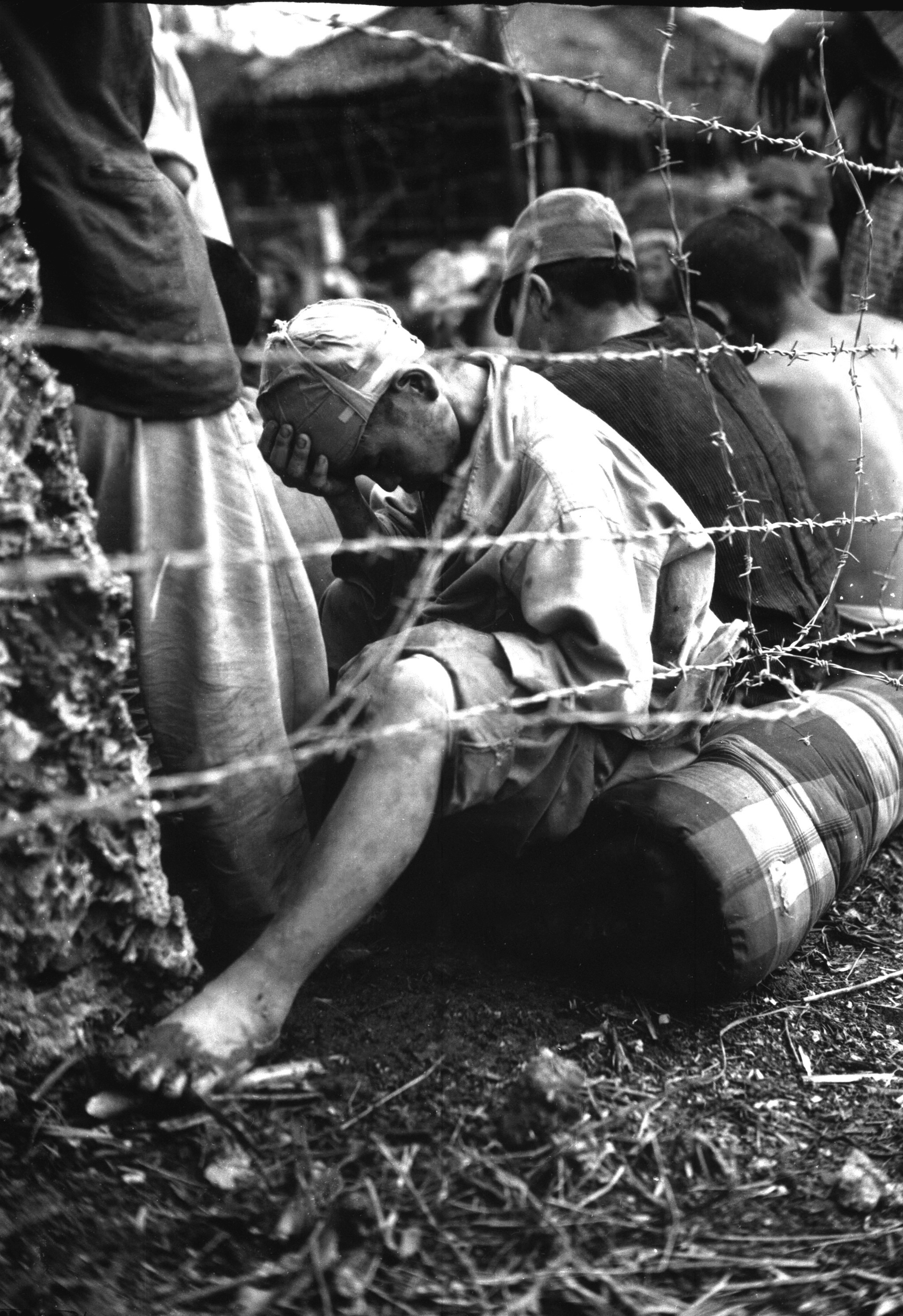
A group of Japanese captured during the Battle of Okinawa

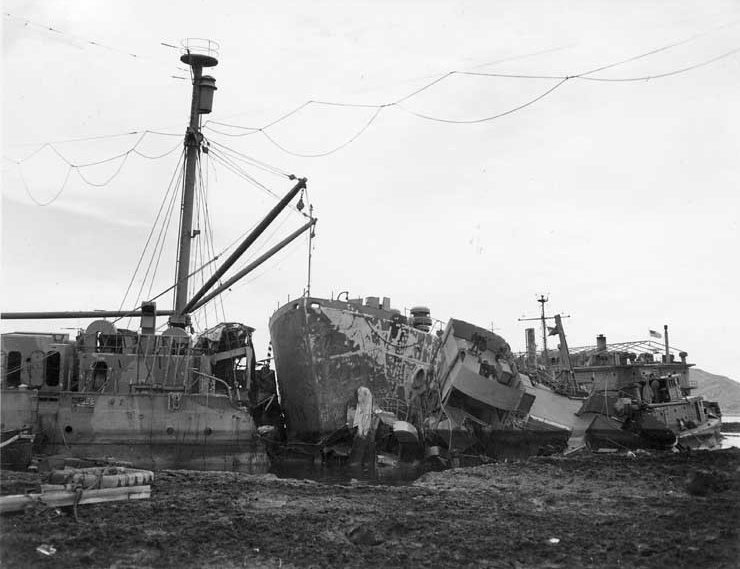
USS Nestor damaged in Typhoon

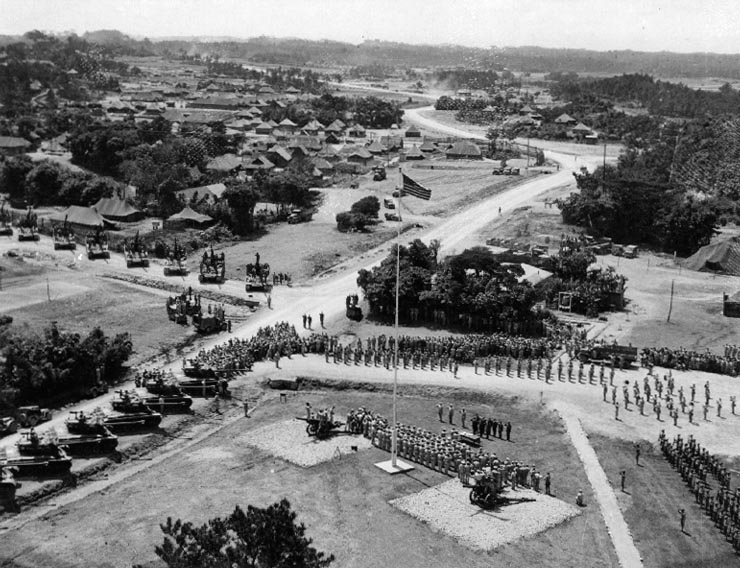
Okinawa-Ryukyus surrender on September 7, 1945

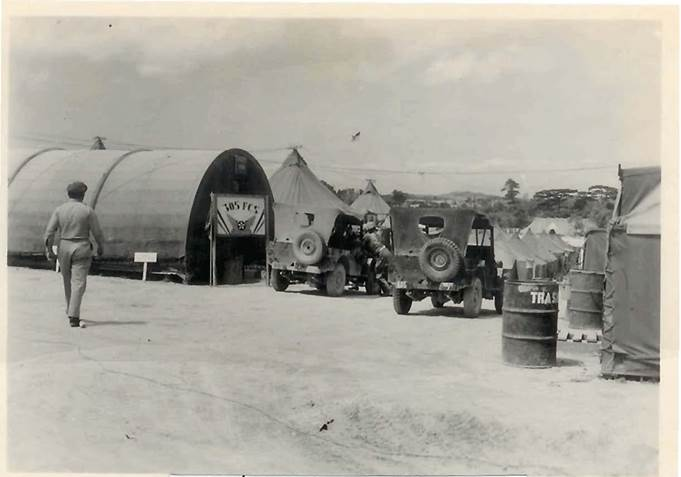
Headquarters 305th FCS, Camp Bishigawa, Okinawa 1945

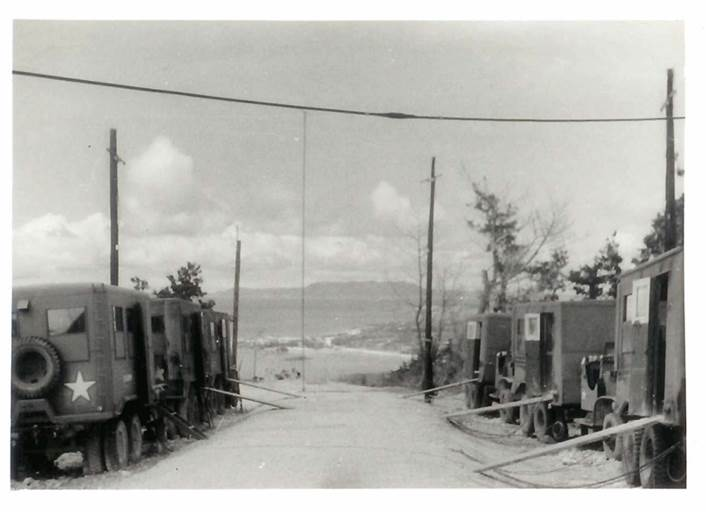
Radar and Comm Vans line the top of Yontan, looking north, Okinawa 1945

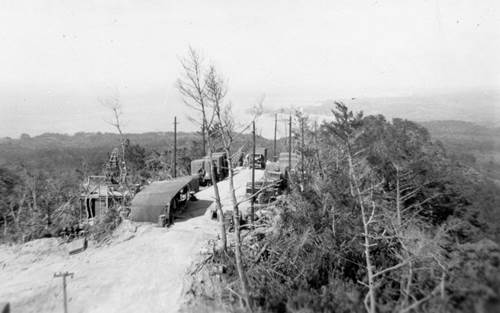
Yontan Radar "Walter Control", Camp Bishigawa, Okinawa 1946

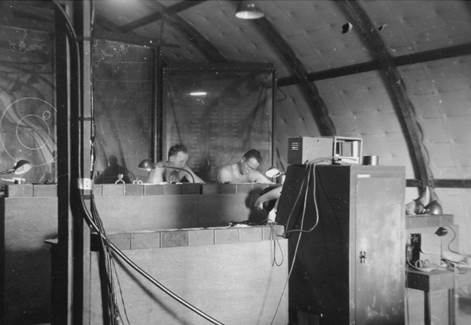
Radar Plotting Room of the 305th FCS, Camp Bishigawa, Okinawa, Japan 1945

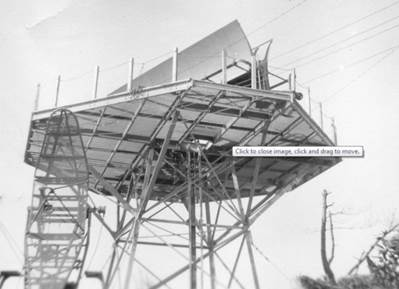
Sq Radars MPS-5 and Lil' Abner, 1940s

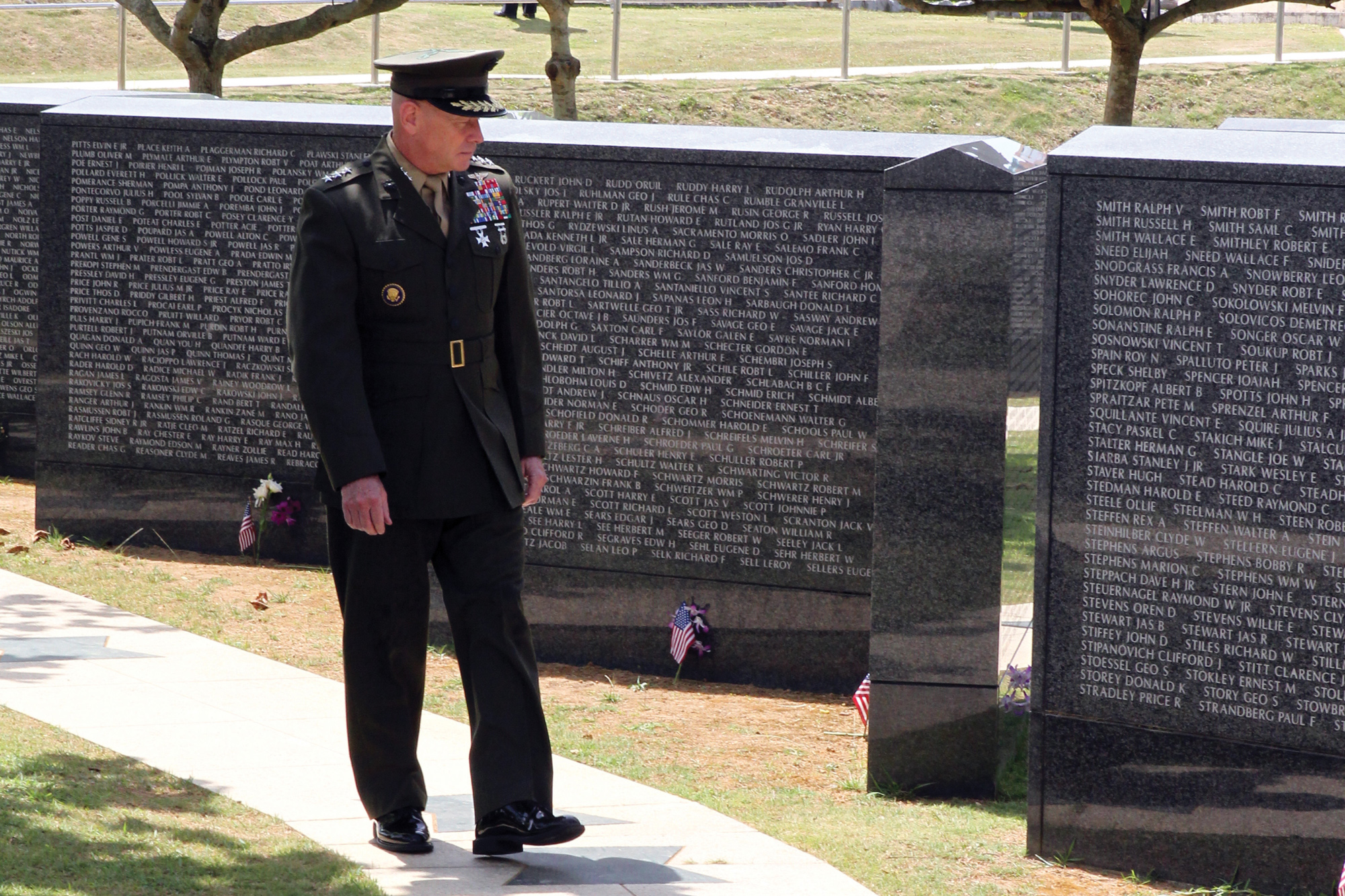
The Cornerstone of Peace Memorial with names of all military and civilians from all countries who died in the Battle of Okinawa

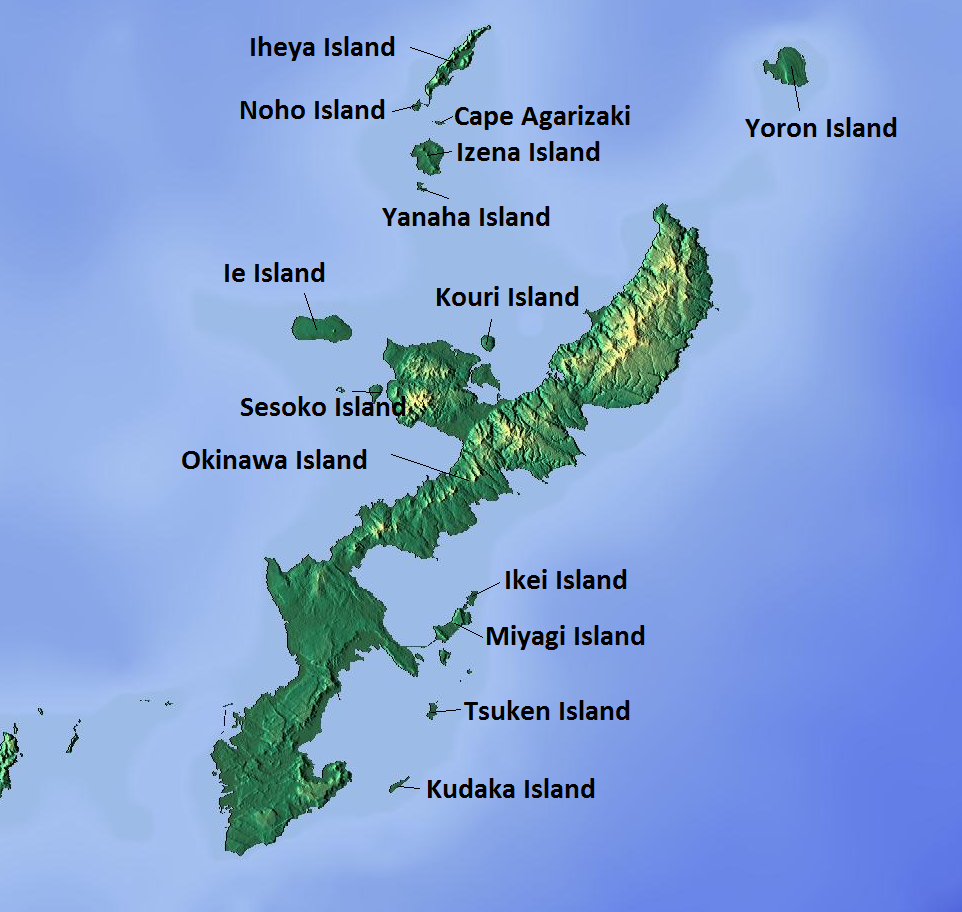
Okinawa Islands map

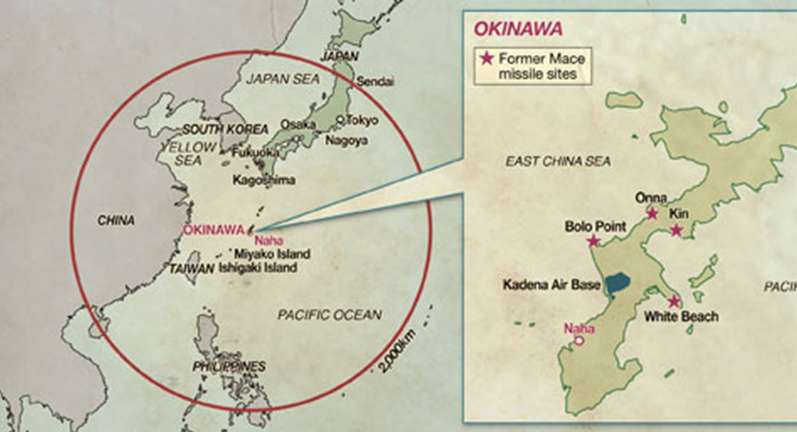
Former Mace missile sites on Okinawa

== See also ==
- Okinawa ground order of battle
- History of the Ryukyu Islands
- Patrol and Reconnaissance Wing 1
- Naval Base Iwo Jima
- Okinawa Memorial Day
