= Awase Airfield =

WWII airfield in Okinawa, Japan

- Okinawa, Ryukyu Islands, Japan
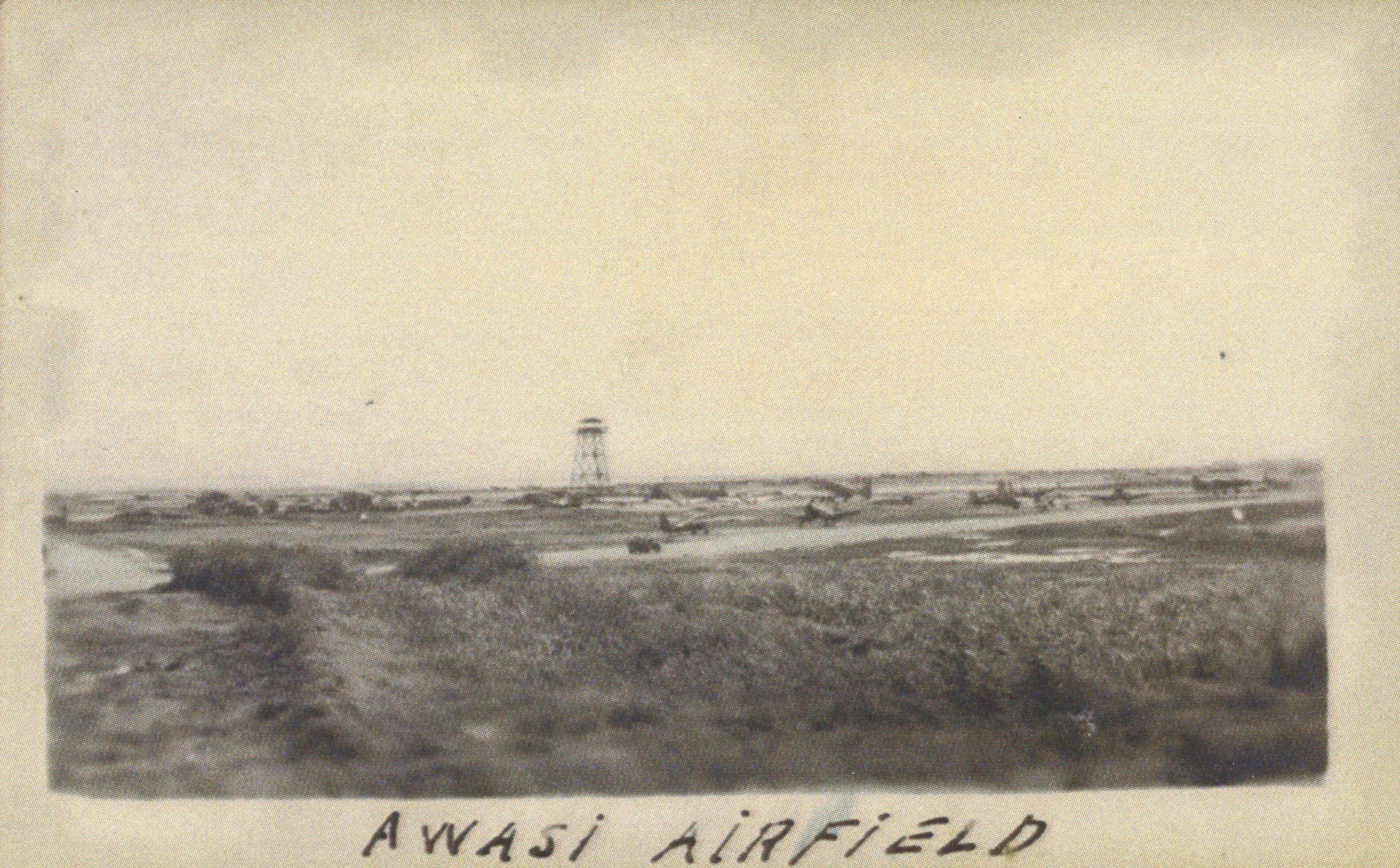

Site information
- Type: Military airfield
- Controlled by: United States Navy

Location
- Coordinates: 26.313°N 127.817°E

Site history
- Built: April–June 1945
- Built by: Seebees
- In use: 1945-50
- Materials: Coral

Garrison information
- Past commanders: Melvin J. Maas (final)

Awase Airfield or NAB Awase is a former World War II airfield on the Pacific coast of Okinawa.

== History ==
=== World War II ===
The Awase area was captured during the first week of the Battle of Okinawa and was surveyed for possible airbase construction in late April 1945. Two Naval Construction Battalions commenced construction of a 5000 ft fighter airstrip on April 23, the 34th and 36th CBs. Along with the airfield the African American Seabees of the 34th constructed a JCC(Joint Communications Center) Radio Transmitter Station. Construction of the airfield was delayed by torrential rains late May into June so the heavy earth-moving equipment was diverted to the maintenance and upgrading of the island's roadways. On 30 June 1945 the base was declared operational and the first aircraft from Marine Air Group 33 (MAG-33) landed at the airfield.

Marine Aircraft Group 14 (MAG-14) comprising VMF-212, VMF-222 and VMF-223 all operating F4Us were based at Awase from July until September 1945.

VMF-312 operating F4Us was based at Awase from July to November 1945.

VMA-322 operating F4Us was based at Awase from July to November 1945.

VMF-323 operating F4Us transferred to Awase from Kadena on 15 July and remained there until the end of the war.

VMF(N)-543 operating F6F-3Ns night-fighters transferred to Awase from Kadena Airfield in July and remained there until the end of the war.

VMB-612's PBJ-1Ds were transferred to Awase in November 1945 when the unit was disestablished.

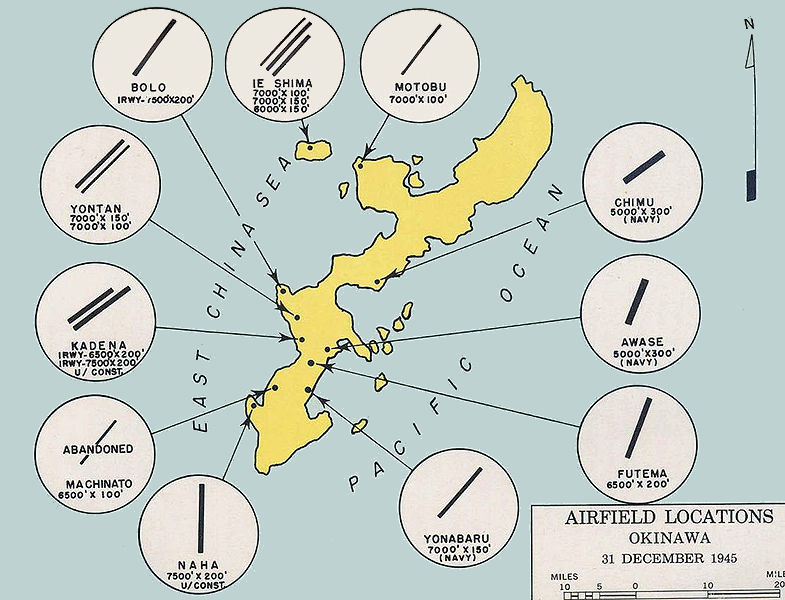
Location of Awase Airfield

=== Postwar ===
In 1950 the US Navy upgraded and the US Air Force constructed communications facilities on the base. By March 1977 all of the airfield area had been returned to Japanese control other than the 0.552 km2 Awase Communication Station at the tip of the Awase peninsula. This base is responsible for communications with the United States Seventh Fleet, and all radio transmission of the U.S. Naval Forces in Okinawa. The station was upgraded by Mobile Construction Battalion 7.

== See also ==
- Chimu Airfield
- Yonabaru Airfield
- Naval Base Okinawa
