= USS Mona Island =

US Navy internal combustion engine repair ship

Coordinates: 37.532667°N 75.441833°W

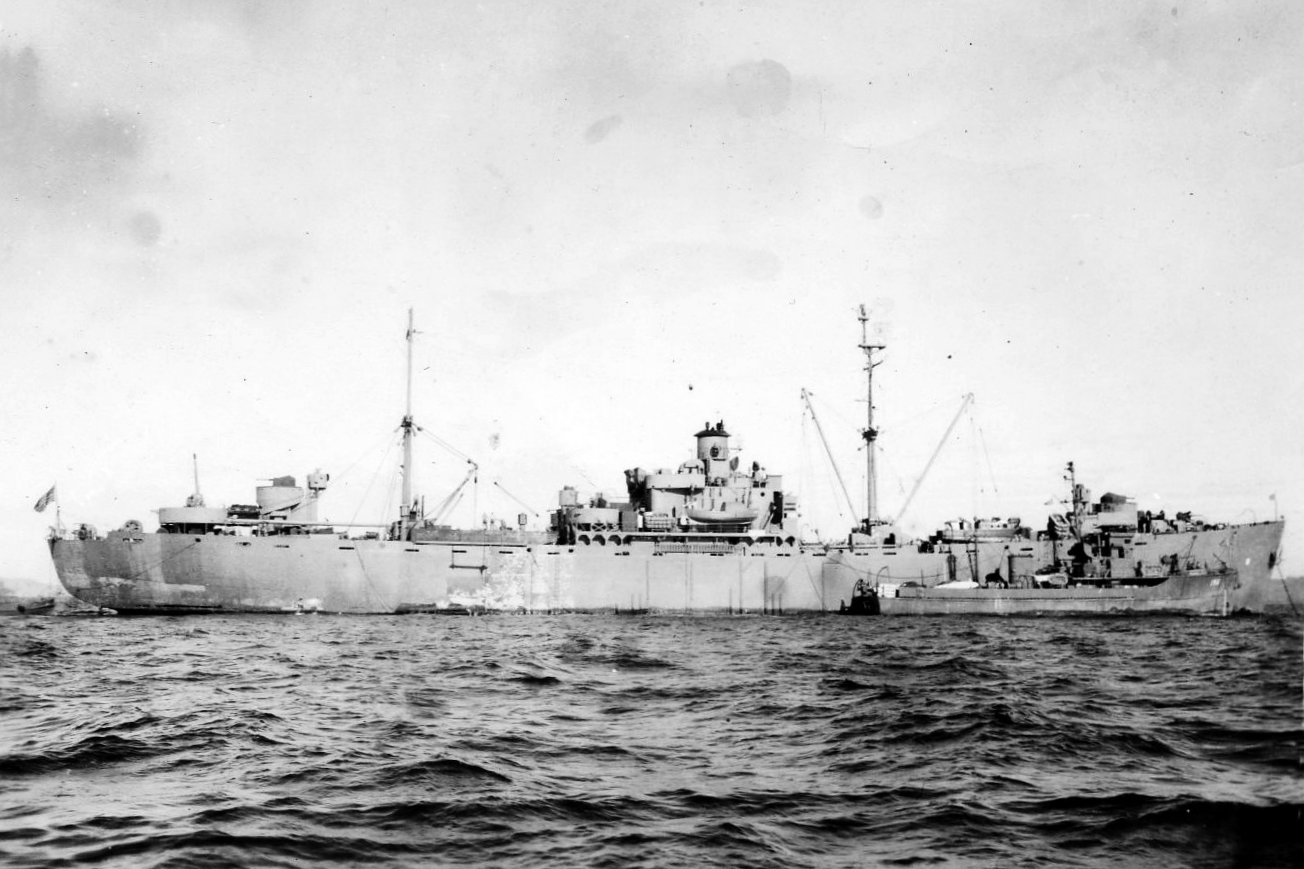
- USS Mona Island (ARG-9) in 1945

History

United States
- Name: USS Mona Island
- Namesake: Mona Island, Puerto Rico
- Laid down: 10 April 1944
- Launched: 11 May 1944
- Acquired: 20 May 1944
- Commissioned: 17 October 1944
- Decommissioned: June 1947
- Stricken: 1 September 1962
- Fate: Scuttled as an artificial reef 20 August 1975

General characteristics
- Class & type: Luzon-class internal combustion engine repair ship
- Type: EC2-S-C1
- Displacement: 5,159 long tons (5,242 t) light; 8,700 long tons (8,840 t) full
- Length: 442 ft (135 m)
- Beam: 57 ft (17 m)
- Draft: 23 ft (7.0 m)
- Propulsion: General Machinery Corporation reciprocating steam engine, single shaft, 1,950 hp (1,454 kW)
- Speed: 13 knots (24 km/h; 15 mph)
- Complement: 574 officers and enlisted
- Armament: 1 × 5"/38 caliber gun; 2 × 3"/50 caliber guns; 4 × 40 mm guns; 12 × 20 mm guns

USS Mona Island (ARG-9) was Luzon-class internal combustion engine repair ship in service with the United States Navy from 1944 to 1947. She was sunk as an artificial reef in 1975.

== History ==
Mona Island was laid down on 10 April 1944, as a United States Maritime Commission type (EC2-S-C1) hull, under Maritime Commission contract (MC hull 2634) at Bethlehem Fairfield Shipyard, Inc., Baltimore, Maryland. Launched on 11 May 1944. Acquired by the United States Navy from the Maritime Commission and converted to Internal Combustion Engine Repair Ship (ARG-9) at Maryland Drydock Co, Baltimore, Maryland, and commissioned USS Mona Island (ARG-9), on 17 October 1944.

=== World War II Pacific Theatre operations ===
Following shakedown in Chesapeake Bay, USS Mona Island departed Norfolk, Virginia, 2 December en route to the Pacific. Six days out of Pearl Harbor, on 18 January 1945, she effected the rescue of survivors of a crashed Army C 47 transport, en route to Hawaii from the mainland. On the 24th, she arrived at Pearl Harbor, debarked her passengers, and reported to ComServForce, U.S. Pacific Fleet for duty and onward routing.

Underway on the 27th, she steamed via the Marshalls to Ulithi, arriving 18 February to become the flagship for MinRon 10. Between 19 February and 4 April she remained at Ulithi making repairs on vessels in that harbor. On the 5th, she got underway for Naval Base Okinawa at Kerama Retto, Okinawa, arriving the 10th to commence repairs on the craft which had entered the shallow waters off the prospective invasion beaches to render them safe for the landing forces.

Between 11 April and 7 July repair work on ships alongside and in the harbor was interrupted by 180 air attacks on the harbor. On the latter date Mona Island shifted to the island of Okinawa itself, anchoring in Buckner Bay. There, during the remainder of July, work was interrupted by the approach of one typhoon and 21 air attacks; while the last two weeks of the war brought only air raid alerts.

Mona Island continued her valuable repair services at Buckner Bay until grounded on a reef during a typhoon on 9 October. Ten days later she got underway, towed by the tug Cahuilla (ATF-152), for Guam where temporary repairs to her rudder and screw enabled her to steam, independently, to San Diego, California, 19 November to 11 December. Continuing on from California she transited the Panama Canal once again and headed for New York City where repairs were completed. Cornelius Taft Cone, father of author Carl T Cone was a crew member. Cone wrote Pacific Letters, an epistle-based story that features letters his father wrote while aboard Mona Island during World War II.

=== Decommissioning and fate ===
On 19 March 1946 she steamed down the coast to Norfolk, Virginia, where she decommissioned in June 1947. She remained at Norfolk as a unit of the Atlantic Reserve Fleet until struck from the Navy List on 1 September 1962. She was transferred in 1962 to the Maritime Administration for lay up in the National Defense Reserve Fleet, James River, Fort Eustis, Virginia. The ship was scuttled as an artificial reef off Wachapreague, Virginia, at on 20 August 1975.
