= 2d Combat Cargo Group =

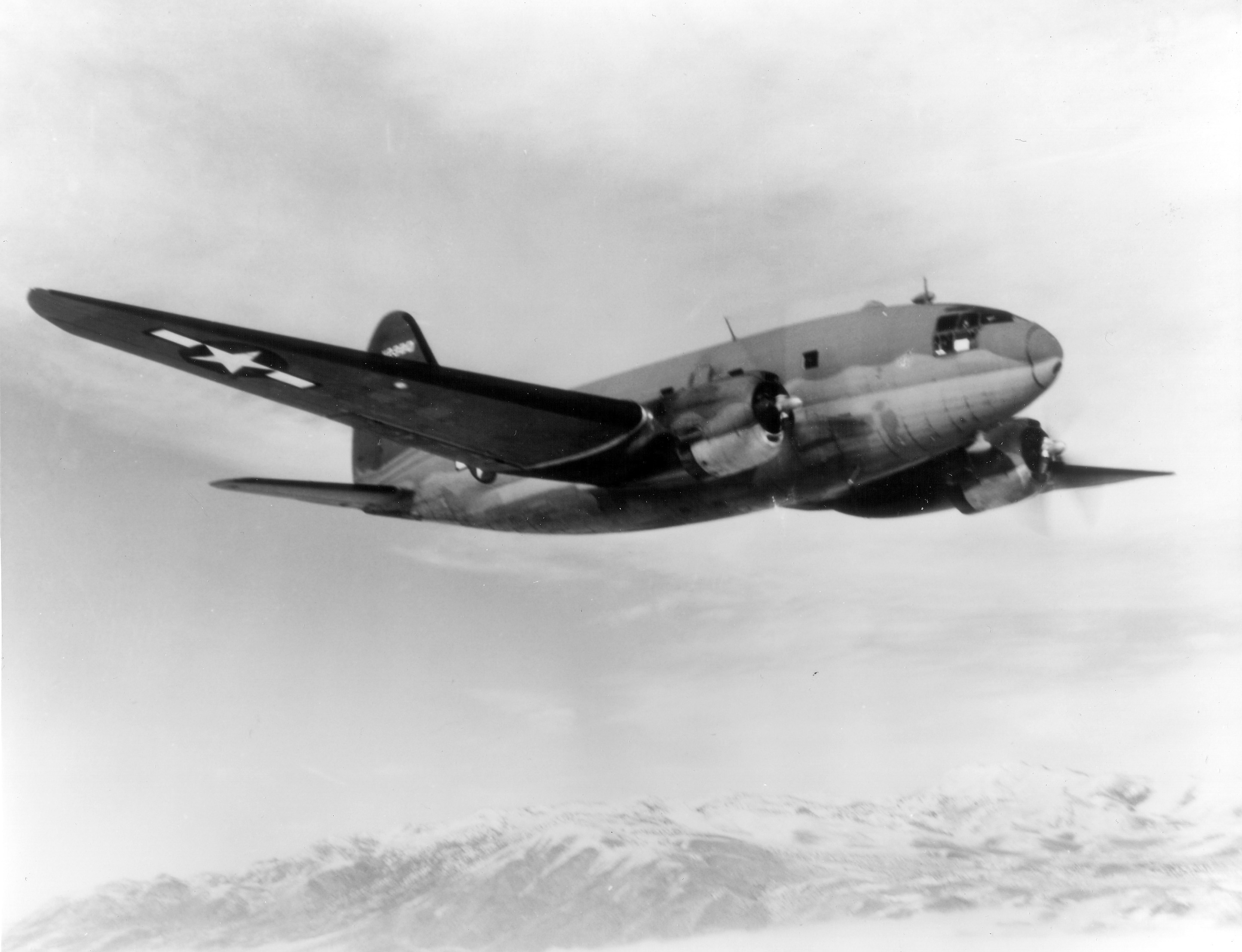
- C-46 Commando as flown by the group
- Active: 1944–1946; 1992–1994
- Country: United States
- Branch: United States Air Force
- Role: Airlift
- Size: Group
- Engagements: Pacific Theater of Operations
- Decorations: Philippine Presidential Unit Citation

The 2d Combat Cargo Group is an inactive United States Army Air Forces unit. The unit was organized at Syracuse Army Air Base in New York. It operated during World War II in the Southwest Pacific, transporting passengers and cargo. Its last duty station under this designation was Yokota Air Base, Japan, where it was inactivated on 15 January 1946.

Although the group was disbanded in 1948, it was reconstituted in 1985 as the 362d Military Airlift Group. It was activated at Rhein-Main Air Base, Germany in 1992 as the 362d Airlift Support Group. Inactivated in 1994, in 2002 it was converted to provisional status as the 362d Air Expeditionary Group

== History ==
=== World War II ===
The 2d Combat Cargo Group was organized at Syracuse Army Air Base, New York, and trained with Curtiss C-46 Commando and Douglas C-47 Skytrain aircraft. It moved to Baer Field, Indiana for overseas processing. Its operational squadrons were the 5th, 6th, 7th, and 8th Combat Cargo Squadrons. The group moved to the Southwest Pacific, arriving in November 1944, and assigned to Fifth Air Force. It initially operated from Biak Island, Papua New Guinea to fly passengers and cargo to US bases in Australia, New Guinea, the Admiralties, and the Philippines. The group also dropped supplies to US and guerrilla forces in the Philippines. The group moved to Leyte in May 1945. Maintaining its flights in the Southwest Pacific, it also transported personnel and supplies to the Ryukyus, and evacuated casualties on return flights. The 2d moved to Okinawa in August 1945. While there it transported personnel and equipment of the occupation forces to Japan and ferried liberated prisoners of war back to the Philippines. The group moved to Japan in September 1945 and served with the occupation forces until it was inactivated on 15 January 1946. It was disbanded on 8 October 1948.

=== Reconstitution ===
The group was reconstituted on 31 July 1985 and redesignated as the 362d Military Airlift Group, It was not active under this designation, but was redesignated as the 362d Airlift Support Group and activated on 1 April 1992 at Rhein-Main Air Base, Germany. It was inactivated c. 1 July 1994. It has since been converted to provisional status as the 362d Air Expeditionary Group and assigned to Air Mobility Command to activate as needed.

== Lineage ==
- Constituted as the 2d Combat Cargo Group on 25 April 1944

Activated on 1 May 1944
Inactivated on 15 January 1946
Disbanded on 8 October 1948

- Reconstituted on 31 July 1985 and redesignated as the 362d Military Airlift Group
- Redesignated 362d Airlift Support Group

Activated on 1 April 1992
Inactivated c. 1 July 1994

- Redesignated 362d Air Expeditionary Group and converted to provisional status on 12 June 2002

=== Assignments ===
- I Troop Carrier Command, 1 May 1944
- Fifth Air Force, November 1944
- 54th Troop Carrier Wing, 13 December 1944 – 5 January 1946
- Twenty-First Air Force, 1 April 1992 – ca. 1 July 1994
- Air Mobility Command to activate or inactivate as needed, 12 June 2002

=== Stations ===
- Syracuse Army Air Base, New York, 1 May 1944
- Baer Field, Indiana, 9–27 October 1944
- Mokmer Airfield, Biak Island, Netherlands East Indies, November 1944
- Dulag Airfield, Leyte, Philippines, May 1945
- Bolo Airfield, Okinawa, c. 20 August 1945
- Yokota Airfield, Japan, c. 22 September 1945 – 15 January 1946
- Rhein-Main Air Base, Germany, 1 April 1992 – ca. 1 July 1994

=== Aircraft ===
- Curtiss C-46 Commando, 1944–1946
- Douglas C-47 Skytrain, 1944, 1945

=== Awards ===
- Air Force Outstanding Unit Award, 1 April 1992 – 30 June 1993
- Philippine Republic Presidential Unit Citation
- Asiatic Pacific Campaign Medal
- Campaigns

Air Offensive, Japan
New Guinea
Western Pacific
Leyte

Luzon
Southern Philippines
Ryukyus

- World War II Army of Occupation Medal (Note: The award would carry the inscription "Japan", not that depicted in the image)
