= Yonabaru Airfield =

World War II airfield

- Okinawa, Ryukyu Islands, Japan
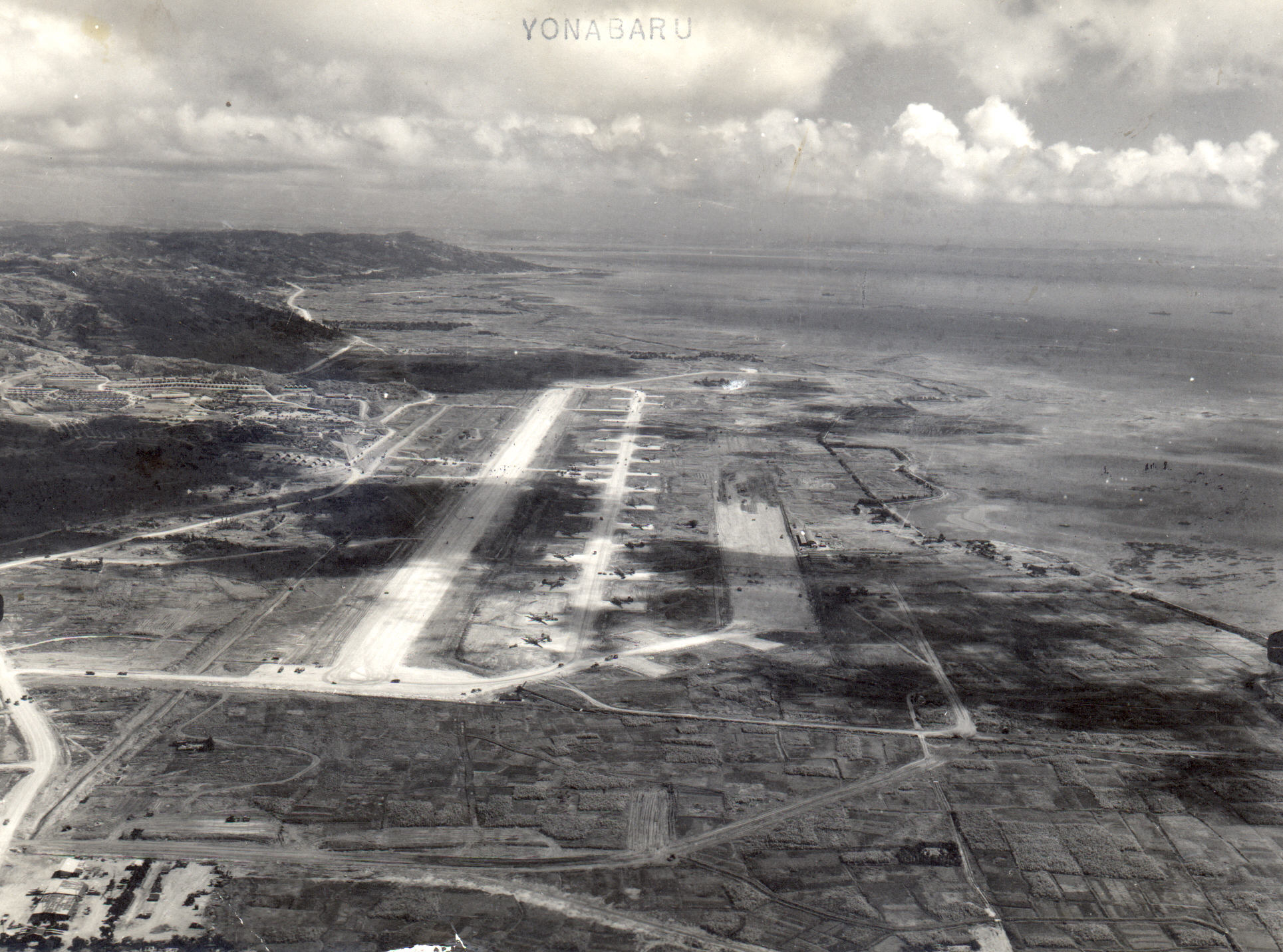
- Aerial view of Yonabaru airfield, Okinawa

Site information
- Type: Military Airfield
- Controlled by: United States Navy

Location
- Coordinates: 26°12′26.33″N 127°45′46.41″E

Site history
- Built: May–June 1945
- Built by: Seebees
- In use: 1945-47
- Materials: Coral

Yonabaru Airfield or NAB Yonabaru is a former World War II airfield on the Pacific coast of Okinawa. The base was disestablished on 30 June 1947.

== History ==
=== World War II ===
Yonabaru Airfield was originally established by the Imperial Japanese Army Air Force. The airfield was captured on 15 May 1945 during Battle of Okinawa. The 145th Naval Construction Battalion (Seebees) began to improve the airfield for service as a patrol/bomber airstrip in June once the fighting had moved further south. On 15 August 1945 the base with its 6,500 feet (2,000 m) runway was ready for use by US Navy aircraft.

VPB-124 operating PB-4Ys was based at Yonabaru from 10 August until 12 December 1945.

The base was severely damaged by Typhoon Louise on 9 October 1945.

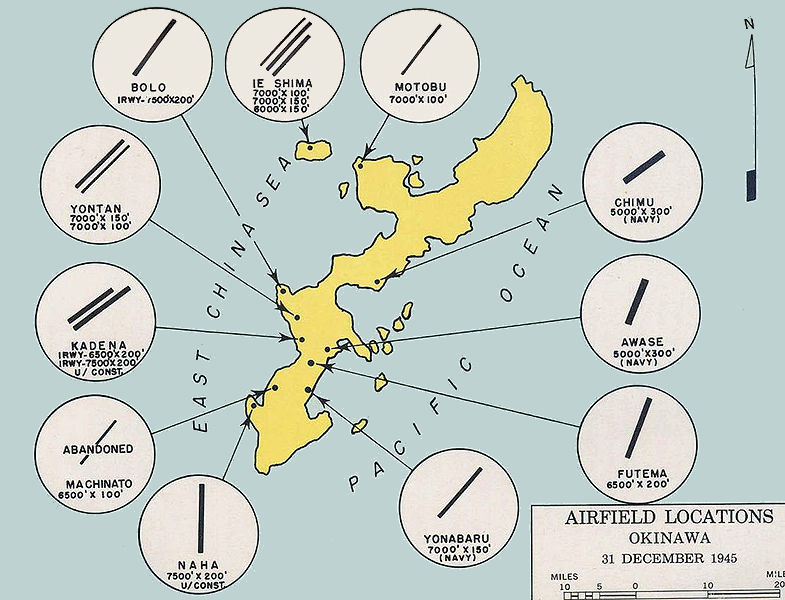
Location of Chimu Airfield

=== Postwar ===
On 27 February 1957, the Deputy Governor announced that the Yonabaru airfield site would be used as a Marine helicopter installation.

== See also ==
- Awase Airfield
- Chimu Airfield
- Naval Base Okinawa
