= Chimu Airfield =

World War II airfield in Okinawa, Japan

- Okinawa, Ryukyu Islands, Japan
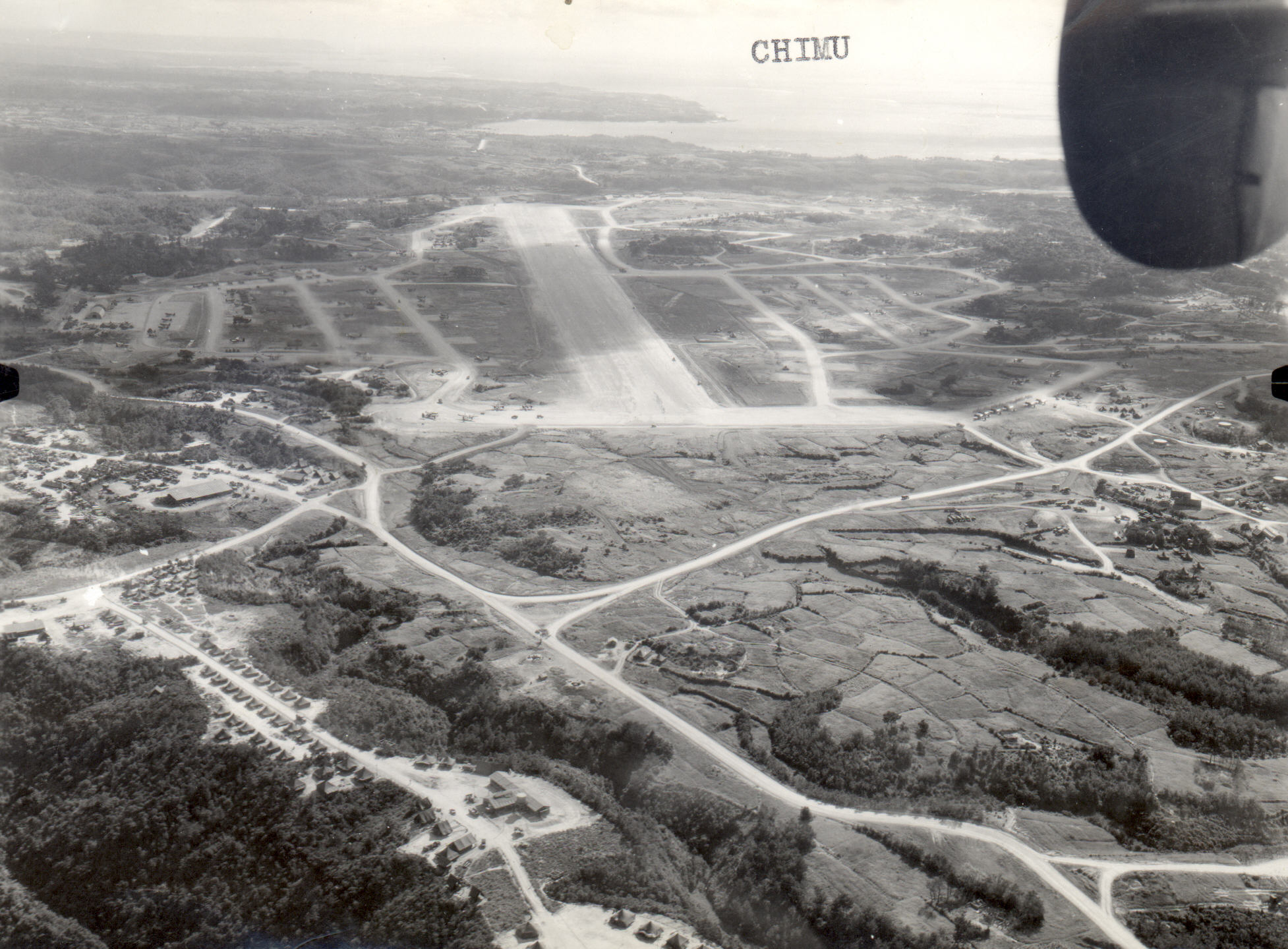
- Aerial view of Chimu airfield, Okinawa

Site information
- Type: Military Airfield
- Controlled by: United States Navy

Location
- Coordinates: 26°27′33.95″N 127°55′04.00″E

Site history
- Built: May–June 1945
- Built by: Seebees
- In use: 1945
- Materials: Coral

Chimu Airfield or NAB Chimu is a former World War II airfield on the Pacific coast of Okinawa. The airfield was inactivated after October 1945.

== History ==
=== World War II ===
The Chimu Wan area was captured during the first week of the Battle of Okinawa. The Chimu Wan area was surveyed for possible airbase construction in late April 1945 and the Seabees of the 40th CB commenced construction of a fighter airstrip there on 6 May. Despite periodic Japanese mortar and sniper fire, by 1 July 1945 the base with its 5000 ft runway was ready for use by US Navy fighters.

Marine Aircraft Group 22 (MAG-22) was based at Chimu in September 1945.

Marine Aircraft Group 31 (MAG-31) was based at Chimu from 1 July 1945 until moving to Yokosuka for occupation duty on 12 October 1945, MAG-31 squadrons included VMF-224 and VMF-311 operating F4Us.

VMF(N)-533 flying the radar-equipped Grumman F6F-5N Hellcat operated night defense missions; their new Grumman F7F Tigercats arrived on Okinawa too late to see combat.

VMB-612 operating PBJ-1D and PBJ-1Js was based at Chimu from July until the end of the war. The squadron conducted anti-ship operations including use of the Tiny Tim rocket.

A seaplane base at Chimu was established in July 1945. On 14 July VPB-208 operating PBM-5s deployed to Chimu, they were followed by VPB-26 operating PBM-5s on 15 July, VPB-22 operating PBM-3Ds on 16 August and VPB-205 operating PBM-5s on 25 on August. The USS Hamlin and USS St. George provided tender support.

VPB-13 operating Consolidated PB2Y Coronados was based at Chimu from 1–22 September 1945.

The seaplane base was disestablished after it was destroyed by typhoons in September and October 1945.

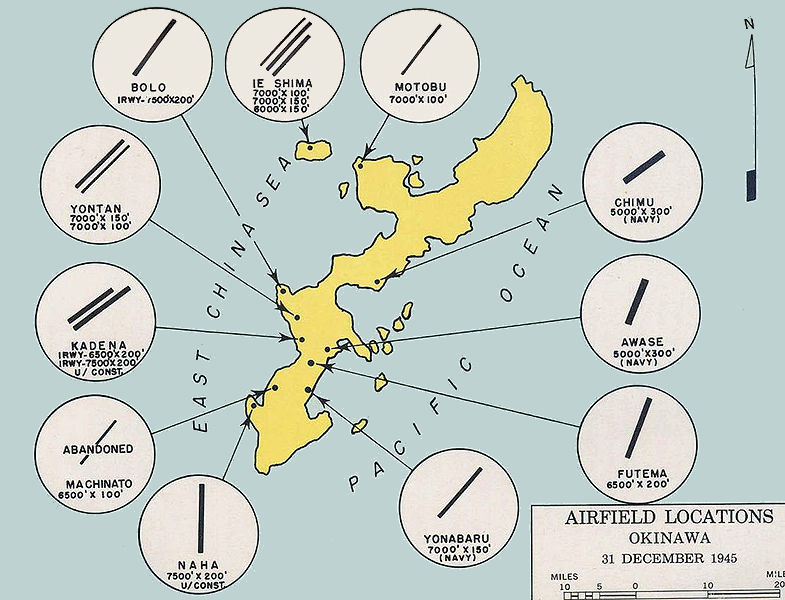
Location of Chimu Airfield

=== Post war ===
Post war the base was repurposed by USN Mobile Construction Battalions 3, 9 and 11. On September 20, 1965, the base was reopened by the United States Marine Corps as Camp Hansen.

== See also ==
- Camp Hansen
- Yonabaru Airfield
- Naval Base Okinawa
