= Bolo Airfield =

World War II airfield on Okinawa, Japan

Bolo Airfield
- Part of Eighth Air Force
- Okinawa, Ryukyu Islands, Japan
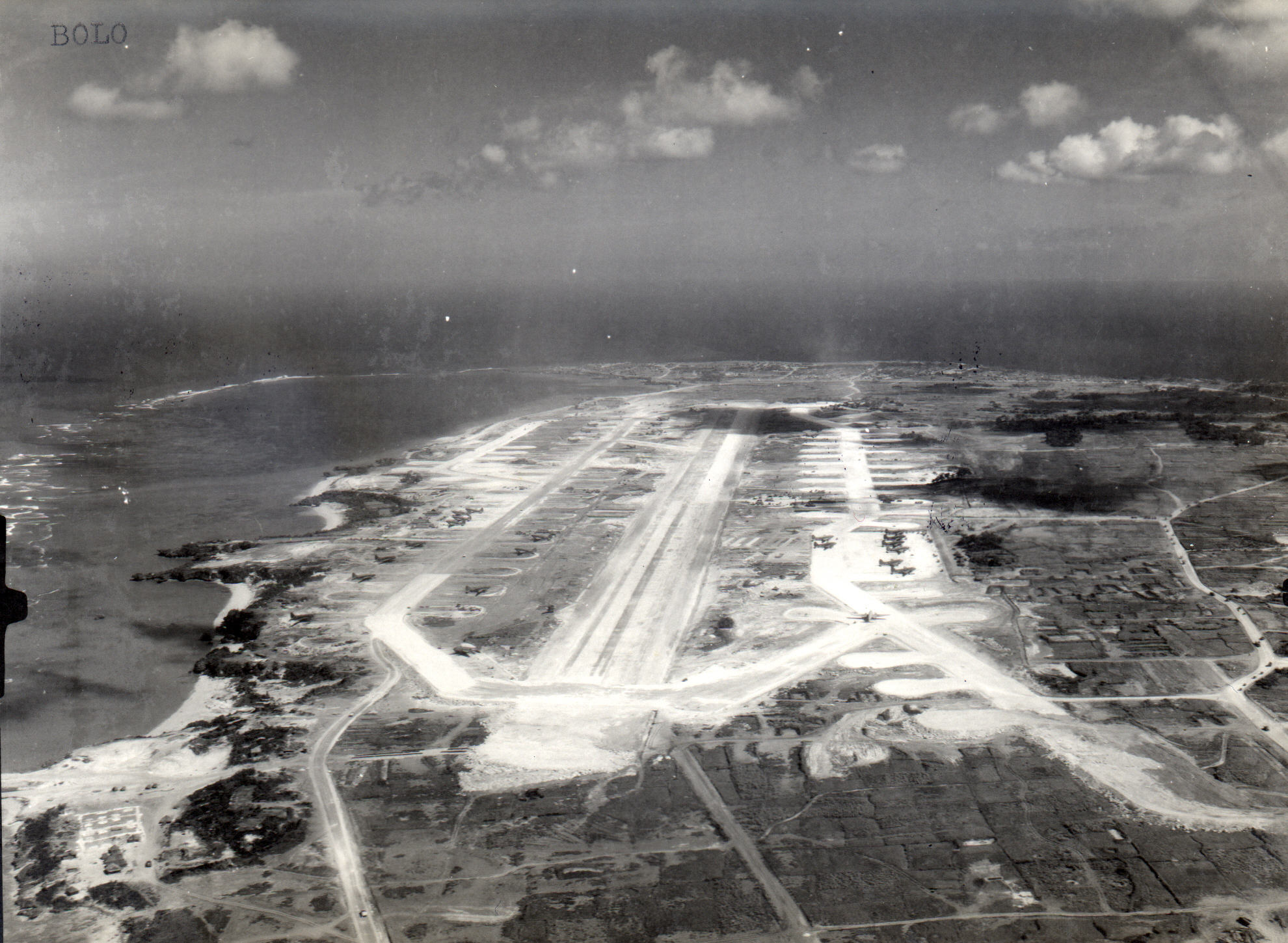
- Aerial view of Bolo airfield, Okinawa

Site information
- Type: Military Airfield
- Controlled by: United States Army Air Forces

Location
- Coordinates: 26°26′19.64″N 127°43′06.73″E

Site history
- Built: Prior to April 1945
- In use: 1945-1946

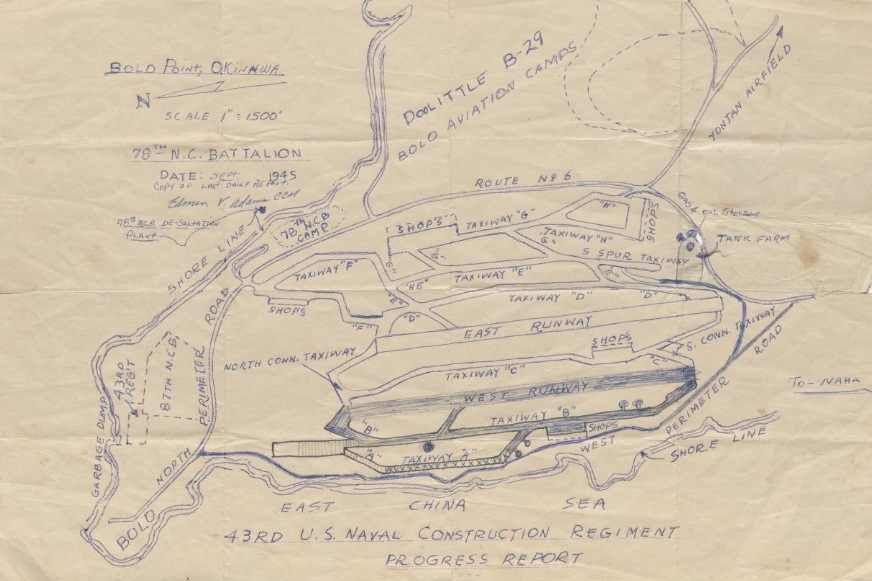
Bolo Airfield Seabee map 1945

Bolo Airfield (also known as Bolo Point Airfield) is a former World War II airfield at Naval Base Okinawa in Okinawa, at Bolo Point on the East China Sea coast. The airfield was inactivated after 1946 and returned to Japanese control in 1972. Currently, it is a part of Yomitan village, where it has been redeveloped into a golf course and recreation area.

== History ==
This airfield was originally built by the Japanese on what used to be Uzza neighborhood of Yutanza (読谷山) village (now Yomitan). It was seized by the United States during the Battle of Okinawa in April 1945. It was allocated to the Eighth Air Force in July 1945 to station B-29 Superfortress bombers to fly strategic bombing missions in the planned Invasion of Japan.

The airfield was never used for combat operations due to the surrender of Imperial Japan on 2 September 1945. It was however, used by the Fifth Air Force's 7th and 8th Combat Cargo Squadrons (2d Combat Cargo Group) from 20 August 1945 until 5 January 1946 flying Douglas C-47 Skytrain aircraft. After the transport units moved to Yokota Air Base, the facility was closed and used as a surplus storage depot for equipment left on Okinawa after the war was over. There were many tanks, various trucks, crates of airplanes, graders, bulldozers, and crates of other equipment. Eventually, most of this equipment was sent to Japan and then to Korea during the Korean War. During the 1950s and 1960s the airfield was used as an auxiliary training facility for Kadena and Naha Air Bases. It was returned to Japanese control in 1972.

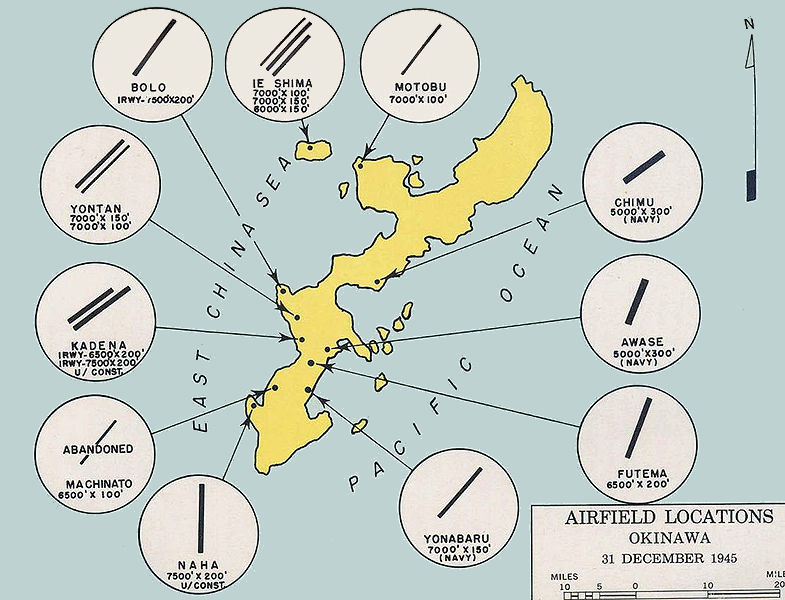
Location of Bolo Airfield
