= SS Sharon Victory =

Victory ship of the United States

- Typical Victory ship

History

United States
- Name: SS Sharon Victory
- Owner: War Shipping Administration
- Operator: W. R. Grace and Company
- Builder: California Shipbuilding Corporation
- Laid down: 15 April 1944
- Launched: 24 June 1944
- Completed: 28 September 1944
- Fate: Scrapped in Kaohsiung, Taiwan, 1988

General characteristics
- Class & type: VC2-S-AP3 Victory ship
- Tonnage: 7612 GRT, 4,553 NRT
- Displacement: 15,200 tons
- Length: 455 ft (139 m)
- Beam: 62 ft (19 m)
- Draught: 28 ft (8.5 m)
- Installed power: 8,500 shp (6,300 kW)
- Propulsion: HP & LP turbines geared to a single 20.5-foot (6.2 m) propeller
- Speed: 16.5 knots
- Boats & landing craft carried: 4 Lifeboats
- Complement: 62 Merchant Marine and 28 US Naval Armed Guards
- Armament: 1 × 5 inch (127 mm)/38 caliber gun; 1 × 3 inch (76 mm)/50 caliber gun; 8 × 20 mm Oerlikon

The SS Sharon Victory was a Victory ship built during World War II under the Emergency Shipbuilding program for the owner War Shipping Administration. She was launched by the California Shipbuilding Company on April 15, 1944, and completed on September 28, 1944. The ship's United States Maritime Commission designation was 'VC2- S- AP3, hull number 29'. She was operated by the W. R. Grace and Company and later Matson Navigation Company of Hawaii . The 10,500-ton Victory ships were designed to replace the earlier Liberty Ships. Liberty ships were designed to be used just for World War II compared to Victory ships, which were designed to last longer and serve the US Navy after the war. Victory ships differed from Liberty ships in that they were faster, longer and wider, taller, had a thinner stack set farther toward the superstructure, and had a long raised forecastle.

Sharon Victory United States Navy Armed Guards were credited with probably shooting down a plane during the Battle in the Philippines A plane's bomb landed about 55 feet from the Sharon Victory. Sharon Victory was also credited with the assistance of downing a plane on December 6, 1944.

The SS Sharon Victory delivered C-rations to the troops on Okinawa at the Naval Base Okinawa, during unloading came under attack. Sharon Victory fought off a Japanese kamikaze plane attacking the ship.

After World War II, in 1948 she was placed in the Mobile Reserve Fleet and later transferred to the James River, Reserve Fleet. Sharon Victory also served in the Korean War from 1950 to 1955, operated by the States Marine Lines, Inc. After the war the Sharon Victory was mothballed at the James River, Reserve Fleet and was scrapped at Kaohsiung, Taiwan in 1988.
