= USS Hamlin (AV-15) =

Tender of the United States Navy

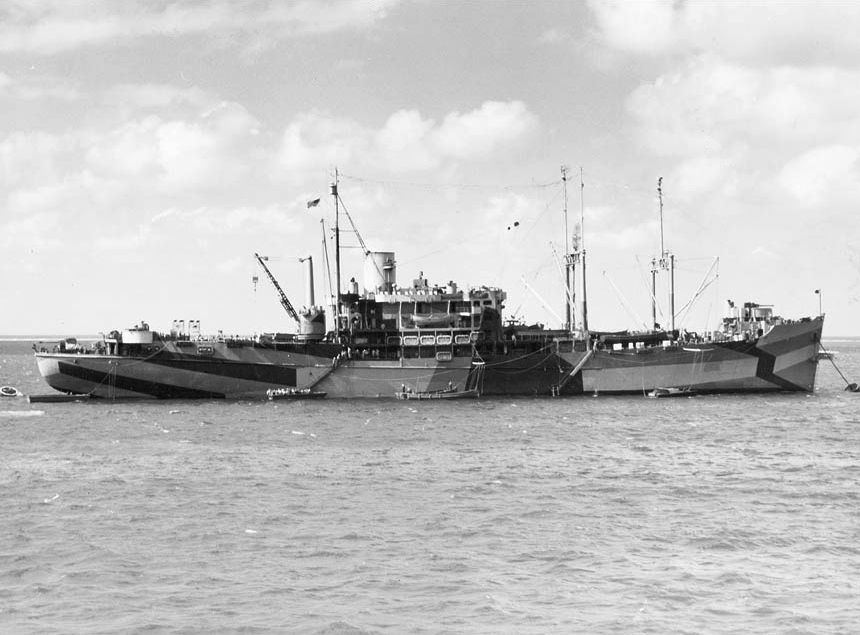
- USS Hamlin (AV-15) in February 1945

History

United States
- Name: USS Hamlin
- Namesake: Hamlin Sound in South Carolina
- Builder: Todd Pacific Shipyards, Inc., Tacoma, Washington
- Launched: 11 January 1944
- Commissioned: 26 June 1944
- Decommissioned: 15 January 1947
- Stricken: 1 July 1963
- Honors and awards: 3 battle stars (World War II)
- Fate: Sold for scrapping, 8 March 1962

General characteristics
- Class & type: Kenneth Whiting-class seaplane tender
- Displacement: 8,510 long tons (8,647 t) light; 12,610 long tons (12,812 t) full
- Length: 492 ft (150 m)
- Beam: 69 ft 6 in (21.18 m)
- Draft: 23 ft 9 in (7.24 m)
- Propulsion: Steam turbine, 2 boilers, 1 shaft, 8,500 hp (6,338 kW)
- Speed: 19 knots (35 km/h; 22 mph)
- Complement: 1,077
- Armament: 2 × single 5"/38 caliber guns; 2 × quad 40 mm AA gun mounts; 2 × dual 40 mm AA gun mounts; 16 × single 20 mm AA gun mounts

USS Hamlin (AV-15) was a Kenneth Whiting-class seaplane tender in the United States Navy.

Hamlin was launched by Todd-Pacific Shipyards, Inc., Tacoma, Washington on 11 January 1944; sponsored by Miss Constance Taffinder, daughter of Rear Admiral S. A. Taffinder; and commissioned on 26 June 1944.

== Service history ==
Hamlin conducted shakedown drills off California until 16 August 1944 when she departed San Pedro for the Pacific. Arrived Pearl Harbor 24 August, the ship loaded aviation gasoline and supplies and got underway on 29 August for Eniwetok. She unloaded cargo and passengers there and continued to recently won Saipan, arriving on 11 September to take up her plane-tending duties. During this period, seaplanes tended by Hamlin were making important contributions to the Pacific fighting by engaging in reconnaissance, hunter-killer operations against submarines, and air coverage of fleet cripples. She moved to Ulithi 11 October and back to Saipan anchorage on 29 December 1944, all the time continuing her vital support of seaplane operations. Hamlin's aircraft protected the cruisers Houston (CL-81) and Reno (CL-96), damaged on 14 October off Luzon, and flew photographic missions and rescue flights as the Navy pressed home the ever-mounting attack on Japanese-held territory.

The operation next on her schedule was Iwo Jima, necessary to safeguard lines of communication and provide a base from which fighter aircraft could protect B-29s in bombing missions over Japan. Hamlin proceeded 15 February to Guam for fuel oil and two days later departed for Iwo Jima. She arrived two days after this historic and bitterly contested landing had begun, and with two other tenders established a floating seaplane base from which search and rescue missions were performed.

Debris and off-shore gunfire prevented the establishment of the seadrome until 24 February, and Hamlin worked under the handicap of large swells and congestion of the sea areas around Iwo Jima. The ship also experienced numerous air raids during this operation, but suffered no damage. She got underway for Saipan on 8 March 1945, and after another voyage to Guam, she returned to prepare for the Okinawa operation and the largest seaplane tending job of the war.

Hamlin sailed on 23 March from Saipan for Okinawa, the first step prior to the home islands in the long campaign across the Pacific. Her commander was designated Commander, Seaplane Base Group. The tenders arrived Kerama Retto, west of Okinawa, 28 March, the day after it had been secured and 4 days before the main landings on Okinawa. During the operation, Hamlin's planes provided long-range search, antisubmarine patrols, and air-sea rescue services, even providing aviation gasoline and luboil to battleships and cruisers. Her work was performed amid nearly constant air attack by Japanese suicide planes, and, though many ships in the anchorage were damaged by repeated attacks, Hamlin fought off all attacks without injury.

The tender group shifted its base of operations to Chimu Wan, Okinawa, 11 July. After the surrender of Japan, Hamlin and other tenders got underway to assist in the occupation 16 August, anchoring in Yokosuka harbor 30 August. She began tending seaplanes on patrol over Japanese home waters on 2 September, and was anchored in the harbor when the historic surrender was signed on board Missouri.

Hamlin returned to California following a short period in Japan and decommissioned at San Diego on 15 January 1947. She went to reserve with the San Diego Group and remained there until September 1962 when she was transferred to the Maritime Administration, under Navy ownership, and placed in the National Defense Reserve Fleet, Suisun Bay, California. She was struck from the Navy List on 1 July 1963.

Hamlin received three battle stars for service in World War II.
