= USS LST-17 =

1943 LST-1-class tank landing ship

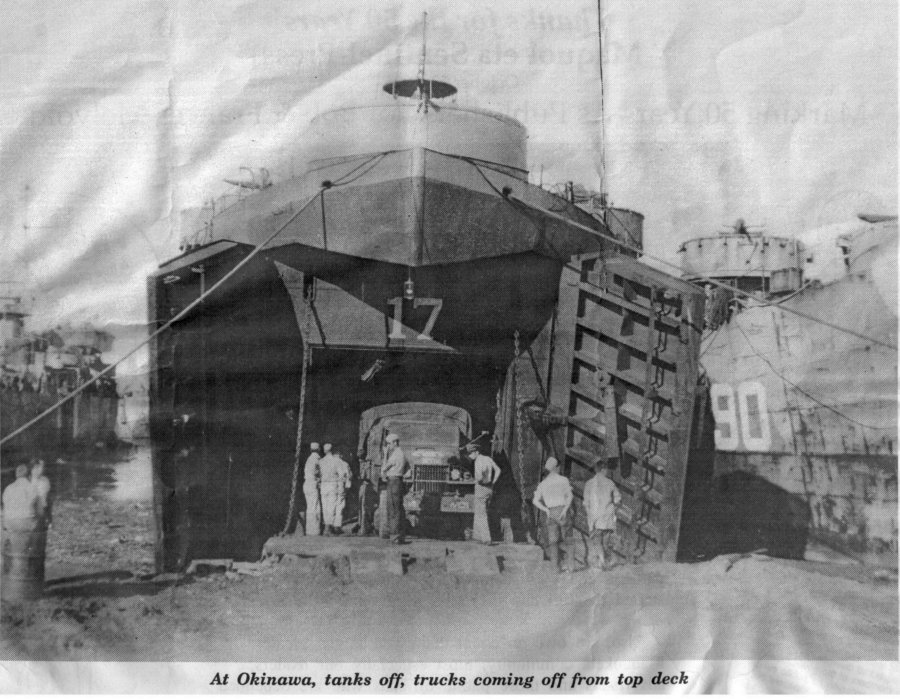
- USS LST-17, beached at Okinawa while offloading tanks and trucks, date unknown. Beached alongside her to port is LST-750.

History

United States
- Name: LST-17
- Operator: United States Coast Guard (1943–1944); United States Navy (1944–1946)
- Builder: Dravo Corporation, Pittsburgh, Pennsylvania
- Laid down: 21 September 1942
- Launched: 8 January 1943
- Sponsored by: Mrs. Sarah H. Bankson
- Commissioned: 19 April 1943
- Decommissioned: 15 January 1946
- Identification: Hull symbol: LST-17; Code letters: NFSV
- Honors and awards: 1 × battle stars
- Fate: Transferred to Commander Naval Forces Far East (COMNAVFE), 15 January 1946

United States
- Name: Q015
- Operator: COMNAVFE
- In service: 15 January 1946
- Out of service: date unknown
- Fate: Laid up in the Pacific Reserve Fleet

United States
- Operator: 13th Naval District
- In service: 15 November 1954
- Out of service: 15 August 1956
- Fate: Sunk by torpedo in mobile target practice, 15 August 1956

General characteristics
- Type: LST-1-class tank landing ship
- Displacement: 4,080 long tons (4,145 t) full load; 2,160 long tons (2,190 t) landing
- Length: 328 ft (100 m) oa
- Beam: 50 ft (15 m)
- Draft: Full load: 8 ft 2 in (2.49 m) forward; 14 ft 1 in (4.29 m) aft; Landing at 2,160 t: 3 ft 11 in (1.19 m) forward; 9 ft 10 in (3.00 m) aft
- Installed power: 2 × 900 hp (670 kW) Electro-Motive Diesel 12-567A diesel engines; 1,700 shp (1,300 kW)
- Propulsion: 1 × Falk main reduction gears; 2 × Propellers
- Speed: 12 kn (22 km/h; 14 mph)
- Range: 24,000 nmi (44,000 km; 28,000 mi) at 9 kn (17 km/h; 10 mph) while displacing 3,960 long tons (4,024 t)
- Boats & landing craft carried: 2 or 6 x LCVPs
- Capacity: 2,100 tons oceangoing maximum; 350 tons main deckload
- Troops: 16 officers, 147 enlisted men
- Complement: 13 officers, 104 enlisted men
- Armament: Varied, ultimate armament; 2 × twin 40 mm (1.57 in) Bofors guns; 4 × single 40 mm Bofors guns; 12 × 20 mm (0.79 in) Oerlikon cannons

Service record
- Part of: LST Flotilla 17
- Operations: Invasion of Normandy (6–25 June 1944)
- Awards: American Campaign Medal; European–African–Middle Eastern Campaign Medal; Asiatic–Pacific Campaign Medal; World War II Victory Medal; Navy Occupation Service Medal w/Asia Clasp

USS LST-17 was a United States Navy LST-1-class tank landing ship used in the European Theater of Operations and Asiatic-Pacific Theater during World War II and manned by a United States Coast Guard crew. Like many of her class, she was not named and is properly referred to by her hull designation.

== Construction ==
LST-17 was laid down on 21 September 1942, at Pittsburgh, Pennsylvania, by the Dravo Corporation; launched on 8 January 1943; sponsored by Mrs. Sarah H. Bankson; and commissioned on 19 April 1943.

== Service history ==
=== 1943 convoy duty ===
She was first assigned to the Europe-Africa-Middle East Theater. Departing Little Creek, Virginia, on 27 July 1943, LST-17 headed for Oran, Algeria, arriving there on 14 August 1943. She sailed with Convoy KMS 23 during part of its journey from Gibraltar, to Port Said, Egypt, sailing from Oran, to Bizerta, Tunisia. LST-17 sailed from Algiers, Algeria, to Port Said, Egypt, in October 1943, this time joining with Convoy UGS 19. On 3 November, she set out with nine other LSTs from Aden, Yemen, for Bombay, India, arriving on 10 November. She left the next day for Colombo, British Ceylon, arriving on 16 November. At the end of December she left Calcutta, with 11 LSTs headed for Colombo, British Ceylon, arriving 27 December 1943.

=== 1944 convoy duty/Normandy invasion ===
LST-17 joined Convoy MKS 38 at Bizerta, in January 1944, as it was en route to Gibraltar, arriving 1 February. Forming Convoy MKS 38G, she rendezvoused with Convoy SL 147 and sailed for Liverpool on 2 February, arriving on 13 February 1944.

LST-17 arrived at Milford Haven, Wales, on 3 March 1944. Leaving Milford Haven on 3 March 1944, she proceeded to Portland and returned to Milford Haven on 15 March 1944. On 31 March, she left for Lough Foyle and then visited in turn Derry, Roseneath (sic), Plymouth, Senny Cliff Bay, Weymouth, Solent and Southampton, returning to Solent, on 28 May 1944, to prepare for the Normandy invasion, towing Rhino barges on which were railway equipment for use in France.

She sailed to the sea off Normandy, detaching the Rhino barges to the beach at 16:15 on 6 June 1944. At 20:10 she received the first group of casualties via DUKWs and returned to Solent, on 7 June. She left Solent, for her second trip to France, on 9 June, anchoring two miles (3.2 km) off the Normandy beach at 03:35 on 10 June, moving pontoons ashore and returned to Solent, 11 June, proceeding to Southampton the next day. On 15 June, she left Southampton and anchored off France. The following day she beached at "JIG GREEN" on the "Gold" assault areas at 11:08 with British and Canadian troops. She left the beach on 17 June, and returned to Tilbury, England, proceeding to Solent, on 20 June. She left Solent on 23 June 1944, and beached at Normandy, France, at 16:39 that day, returning to Solent, on 24 June. Again on 27 June, she left Solent and beached in Normandy, France, at 18:48, leaving Normandy, on 28 June, and arriving at Tilbury, on 29 June. She departed Southend on 30 June, arriving at Seine Bay, France, on 1 July 1944, with Convoy ETM 22.

LST-17 sailed for London, on 4 July. Her next trip was on 14 July 1944, when she left Thames Dry Dock and arrived at Normandy, on the same day, returning to Southampton on 16 July. Again on 18 July, she left Southampton, this time for Utah Beach, Normandy, France, leaving there on 19 July, and arriving at Weymouth, England on 20 July. She left Weymouth on 21 July, and arrived at Omaha Beach that same day and returned to Portland. From this time until September 1944, she made continuous trips between Utah Beach and England. Arriving at Cornwall, on 17 September 1944, she departed for Norfolk, Virginia, on 5 October 1944, and taking on fuel and provisions at Norfolk, on 24 October, she arrived at Boston, on 26 October 1944, for overhaul.

On 10 November 1944, her Coast Guard crew was "relieved of manning" LST-17.

=== 1945 convoy duty ===
LST-17 left from New York City, on 26 January 1945, as part of Convoy NG 486 bound for Guantánamo, Cuba, where she arrived on 2 February. She then left the next day as part of Convoy GZ 119 en route to the Panama Canal Zone and Cristóbal, Colón, where she arrived on 6 February.

== Post war ==
Following the war, LST-17 performed occupation duty in the Far East intermittently from September through December 1945. She was decommissioned on 15 January 1946 and turned over to Commander Naval Forces Far East being redesignated Q015.

She was laid up as part of the Pacific Reserve Fleet before being transferred to the 13th Naval District for use as a mobile target where she was sunk by a torpedo on 15 August 1956.

== Awards ==
LST-17 earned one battle stars for her World War II service.

== Bibliography ==
- "LST-17". Dictionary of American Naval Fighting Ships. Naval History and Heritage Command. 30 July 2015. This article incorporates text from this source, which is in the public domain.
- "USS LST-17". NavSource. 18 April 2014.
- "Convoy KMS.23". Arnold Hague Convoy Database.
- "Convoy UGS.19". Arnold Hague Convoy Database.
- "Convoy AB.18A". Arnold Hague Convoy Database.
- "Convoy BM.74". Arnold Hague Convoy Database.
- "Convoy CJ.9A". Arnold Hague Convoy Database.
- "Convoy MKS.38". Arnold Hague Convoy Database.
- "Convoy MKS.38G". Arnold Hague Convoy Database.
- "Convoy SL 147/MKS 38". Arnold Hague Convoy Database.
- "Convoy ETM.22". Arnold Hague Convoy Database.
- "Convoy NG.486". Arnold Hague Convoy Database.
- "Convoy GZ.119". Arnold Hague Convoy Database.
- "USS LST-17" (PDF). United States Coast Guard. This article incorporates text from this source, which is in the public domain.
