= Chourre-class aircraft repair ship =

U.S. Navy aircraft repair ship class

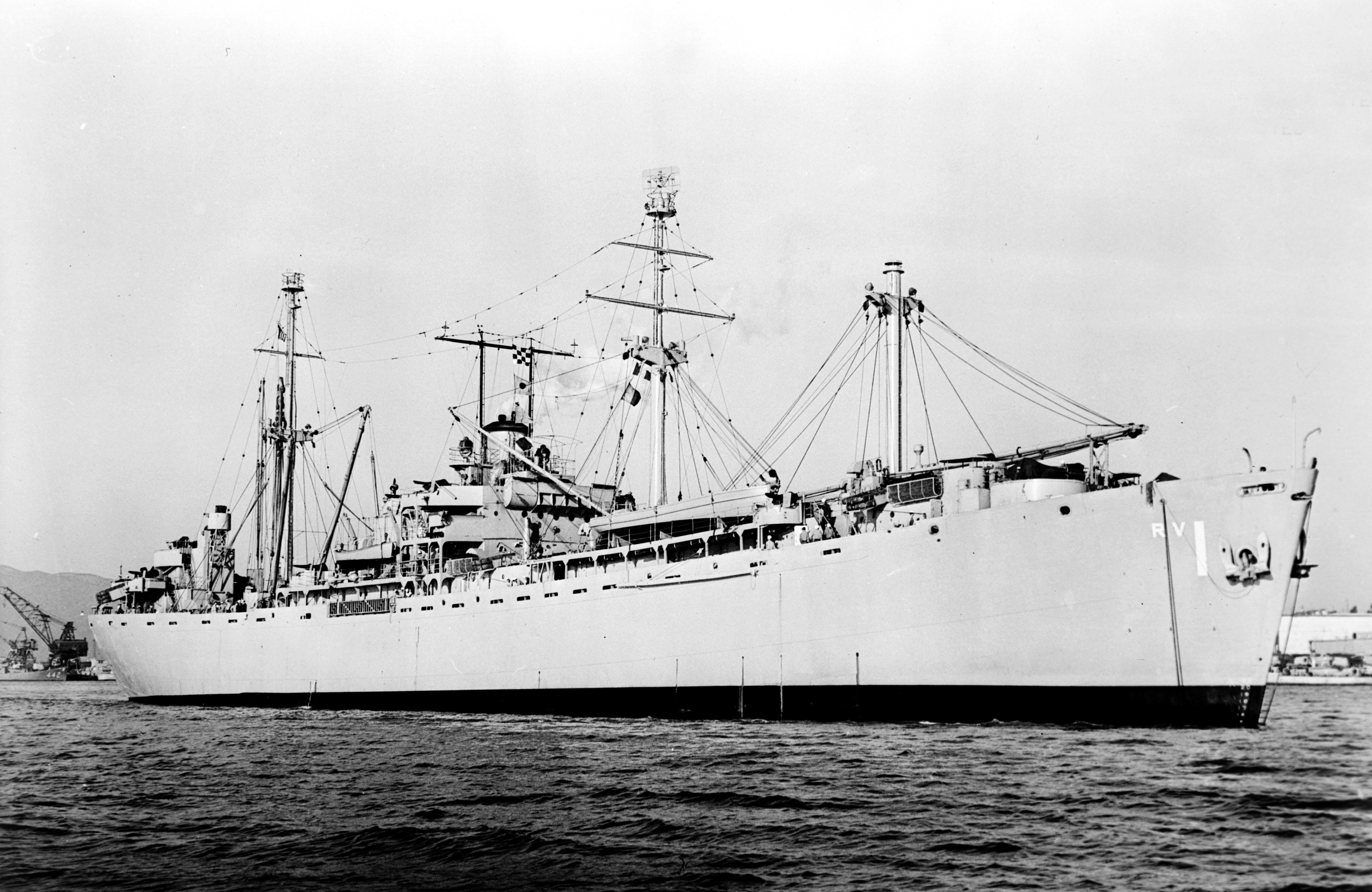
- USS Chourre

Class overview
- Name: Chourre class
- Builders: Bethlehem Fairfield Shipyard
- Operators: United States Navy
- Succeeded by: Aventinus class
- Built: 1944
- In commission: 1944-1955
- Planned: 2
- Completed: 2
- Retired: 2

General characteristics
- Type: Aircraft repair ship
- Displacement: 4,023 long tons (4,088 t)
- Length: 441 ft 6 in (134.57 m)
- Beam: 56 ft 11 in (17.35 m)
- Draft: 22 ft 0 in (6.71 m)
- Installed power: 2,500 hp (1,864 kW)
- Propulsion: 1 × Triple Expansion Machinery; 2 × Babcock & Wilcox header type boilers; 1 × shaft
- Speed: 12.5 knots (23.2 km/h; 14.4 mph)
- Boats & landing craft carried: 6 × Lifeboats
- Capacity: NSFO 9,500 Bbls; Diesel 515 Bbls
- Complement: 71 officers, 507 enlisted men
- Armament: 1 × single 5"/38 caliber gun; 1 × quad Bofors 40 mm guns; 2 × twin Bofors 40 mm guns

The Chourre-class aircraft repair ship was a class of repair ships that were operated by the United States Navy during World War II.

== Design ==
Chourre-class was the first ship class to be designated as aircraft repair ships in the Navy. The class consists of two ships converted from the EC2-S-C1, also known as Liberty ships.

The ships were 441 ft 6 in (134.57 m) long overall (417 ft 9 in (127.33 m) between perpendiculars, with a beam of 56 ft 11 in (17.35 m). She had a depth of 34 ft 8 in (10.57 m) and a draft of 22 ft 0 in (6.71 m). She was assessed at 7,210 GRT, 4,880 NRT, 10,856 DWT.

She was powered by a triple expansion steam engine, which had cylinders of 24.5 inches (62 cm), 37 inches (94 cm) and 70 inches (180 cm) diameter by 70 inches (180 cm) stroke. The engine was built by the Babcock & Wilcox. It drove a single screw propeller, which could propel the ship at 12.5 knots (23.2 km/h).

They served well throughout the war without a ship being lost to enemy action. After the war, they were decommissioned but only Chourre was reactive to take part in the Korean War.

== Ships in the class ==
Chourre class
Hull no.	Name	Builder	Laid Down	Launched	Commissioned	Decommissioned	Fate
ARV-1	Chourre	Bethlehem Fairfield Shipyard	20 April 1944	22 May 1944	7 December 1944	13 September 1955	Scrapped, 5 February 1971
ARV-2	Webster	Bethlehem Fairfield Shipyard	1 July 1944	5 August 1944	15 May 1945	8 June 1946	Sunk as artificial reef, 1977
