= Aircraft repair ship =

Ship used to provide maintenance support to aircraft

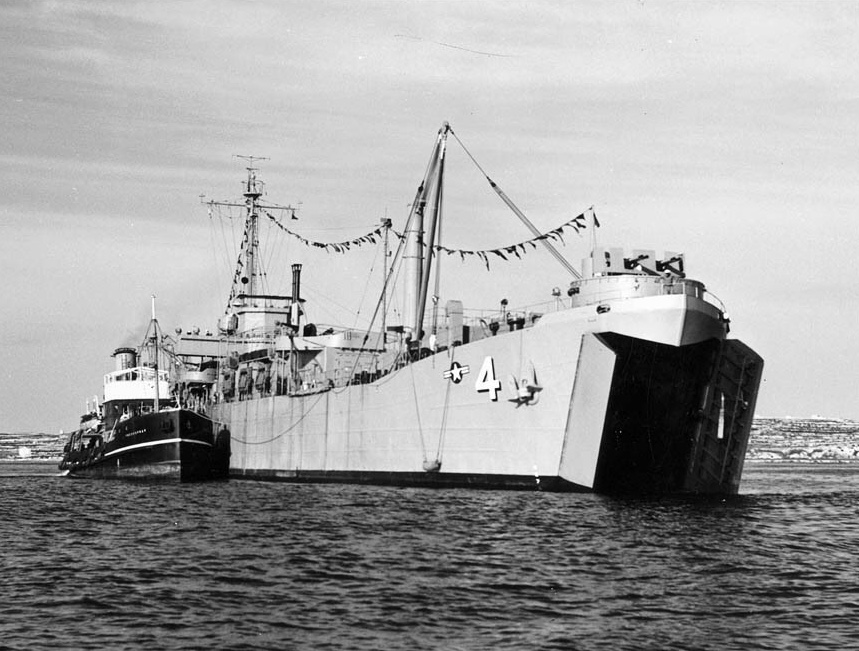
USS Chloris, an aircraft repair ship

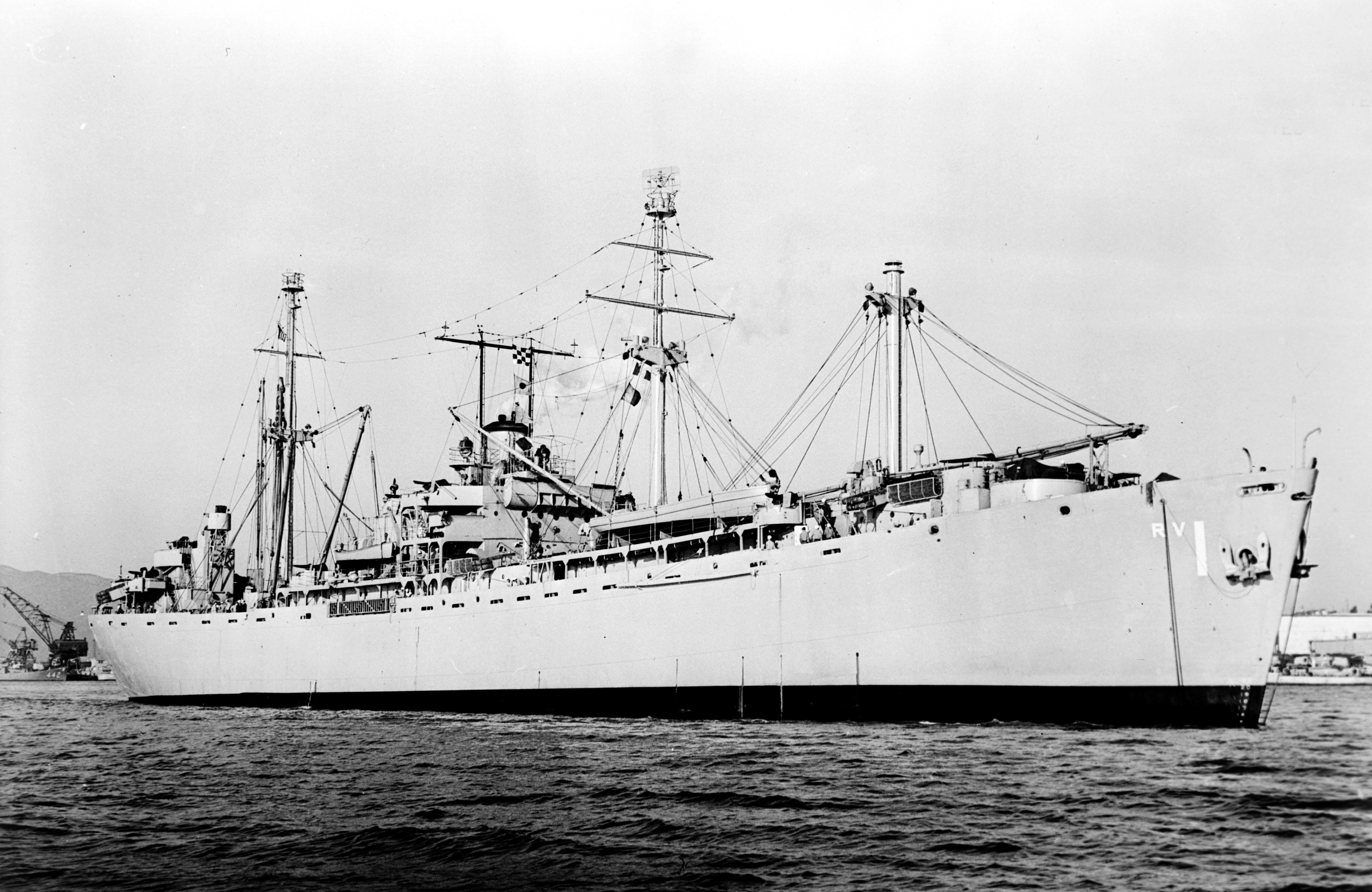
USS Chourre, aircraft repair ship

Aircraft repair ship is a naval auxiliary ship designed to provide maintenance support to aircraft. Aircraft repair ships provide similar services to seaplane tenders, that also cared for the crew. Aircraft repair ships had their own stores of spare parts, like a depot ship. Aircraft repair ships had repair personnel and equipment to repair failures or battle damage on aircraft. Aircraft repair ships also did regular aircraft maintenance.

== United States Navy ==
After World War I two United States Navy ships were used as Lighter-than-Air Aircraft Tenders for naval kite balloon and rigid airship support.

  - USS Wright (AZ-1)
  - USS Patoka (AO-9) operated as a lighter-than-air aircraft tender from 1924 to 1933

During World War II there was a great demand for aircraft repair ships. The US Navy aircraft repair ship were manned by repair units, called Carrier Aircraft Service Units. If needed a Carrier Aircraft Service Unit could be redesignated into a Combat Aircraft Service Unit, Scout Observation Service unit or Patrol Service units. These units could also be land-based or on an aircraft repair ship.

- Chourre class
  - USS Chourre (ARV-1)
  - USS Webster (ARV-2)
- Aventinus class aircraft engine repair ships
  - USS Aventinus (ARV(E)-3)
  - USS Chloris (ARV(E)-4)
- Fabius class
  - USS Fabius (ARV(A)-5)
  - USS Megara (ARV(A)-6)

Aircraft carriers are not aircraft repair ships, but do have aircraft repair shops aboard. Most carrier-based aircraft repairs are done on the aircraft carriers.

During the Vietnam War one seaplane tender was converted into a Helicopter Aircraft Repair Ship (ARVH)

  - USNS Corpus Christi Bay (T-ARVH-1)

== Seaplane tender ==
The US Navy operated a fleet of seaplane tenders used to maintain the many U.S. Navy seaplanes. Some seaplane tenders were converted cargo ships. The USS Curtiss was the first ship built to be a seaplane tender. Seaplane tender serviced and repaired seaplanes used in forward bases used for long-range patrol. Seaplane tenders were able to do repair and maintenance and had all the supplies needed to operate in remote forward bases for months. Once a land-based forward base was built the seaplane tender could move on to a more forward base. Seaplane tenders acted as barracks, supply depots, workshops, air mechanic and control towers for the planes. The USS Albemarle was converted to repair helicopters for the Vietnam War.

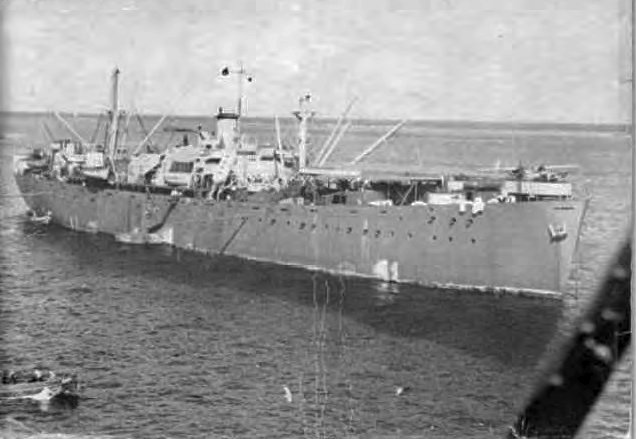
The Liberty ship Rebecca Lukens, part of U.S. Army's Operation Ivory Soap, was converted into a floating machine shop, repair, and maintenance depot and rechristened as the Maj Gen Herbert A Dargue

== United States Army ==
The demand for aircraft repair in the United States Army Air Forces in the Pacific Theatre of Operations was so high during World War II, a special program was started called Operation Ivory Soap. Operation Ivory Soap objective was to convert six Liberty ships into aircraft repair ships, called "Aircraft Repair Units (Floating)". With hundreds of Boeing B-29 Superfortress bomber aircraft operating in the Pacific the ships were stocked B-29 parts and B-29 trained personnel. In addition to the Liberty ship for the B-29, eighteen smaller auxiliary ships were built for fighter aircraft support. These eighteen ship were 187 feet (57 m) long and designated, Aircraft Maintenance Units. The eighteen ships provided repair and maintenance to smaller aircraft like the North American P-51 Mustang, Lockheed P-38 fighters, and Sikorsky R-4 helicopters.

== Parts ==
The key to the aircraft repair ships was the supply of parts, keeping ship supply depots stocked with the needed parts. Both the U.S. Navy and the World War II United States Merchant Navy kept parts flowing from the United States to the aircraft repair ships where they were needed. US Navy operated a fleet of Aviation Stores Issue Ships (AVS) to supply needed parts.

During the 1950s the Navy converted 4 ships into Advance Aviation Base Ships

  - USS Alameda County (AVB-1)
  - USS Tallahatchie County (AVB-2)
- Wright-class:
  - SS Wright (T-AVB-3)
  - USNS Curtiss (T-AVB-4)

== Royal Navy ==
The British Royal Navy for the support of its World War II aircraft, built three aircraft maintenance carriers. The first ship was HMS Unicorn in 1930. The next aircraft repair ships were two Colossus-class ships; HMS Pioneer and HMS Perseus. The Royal Navy also operated a fleet of seaplane carriers.

== Gallery ==
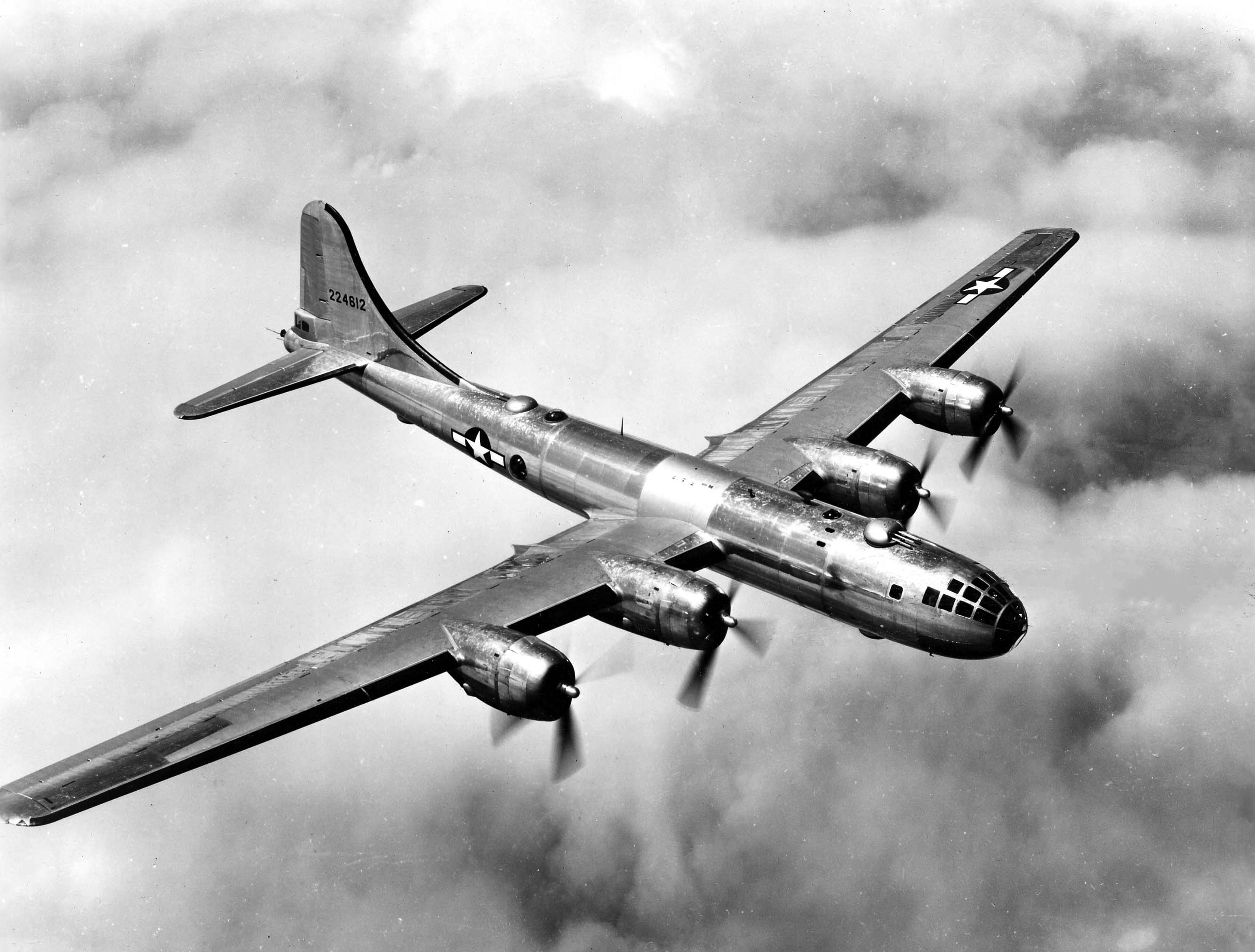
Boeing B-29 Superfortress in flight

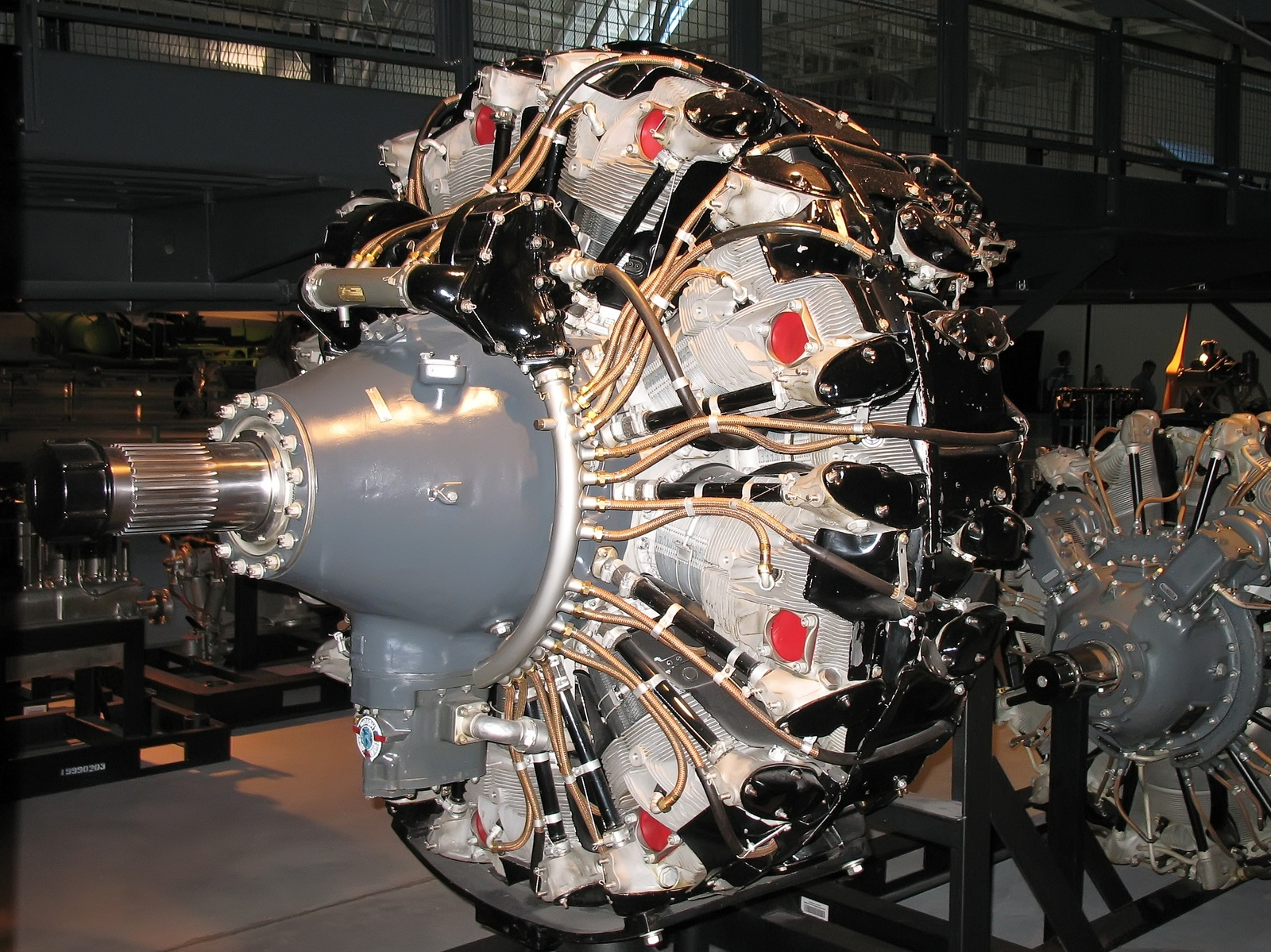
Wright R-3350 Duplex-Cyclone B-29 Superfortress engine

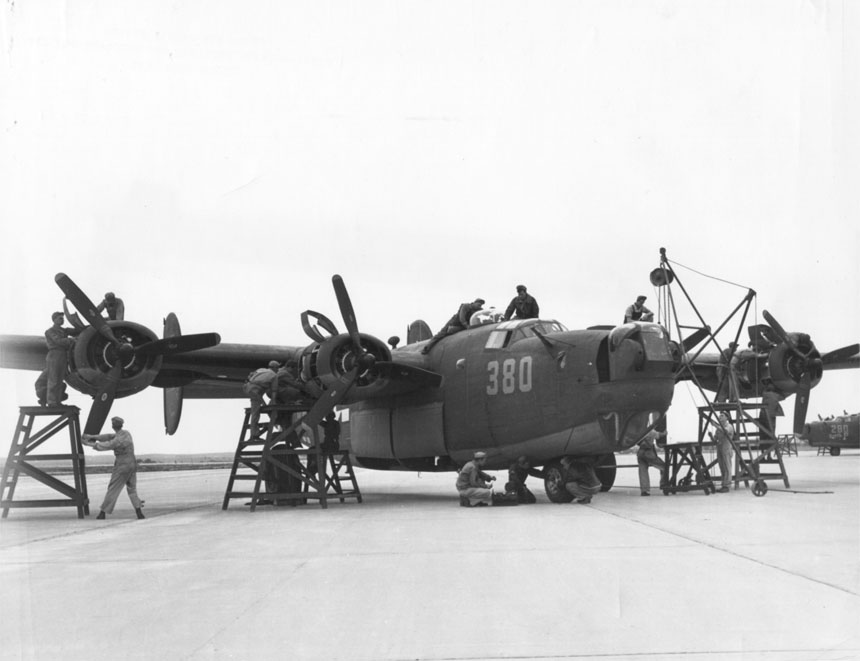
Consolidated B-24 Liberator overhaul

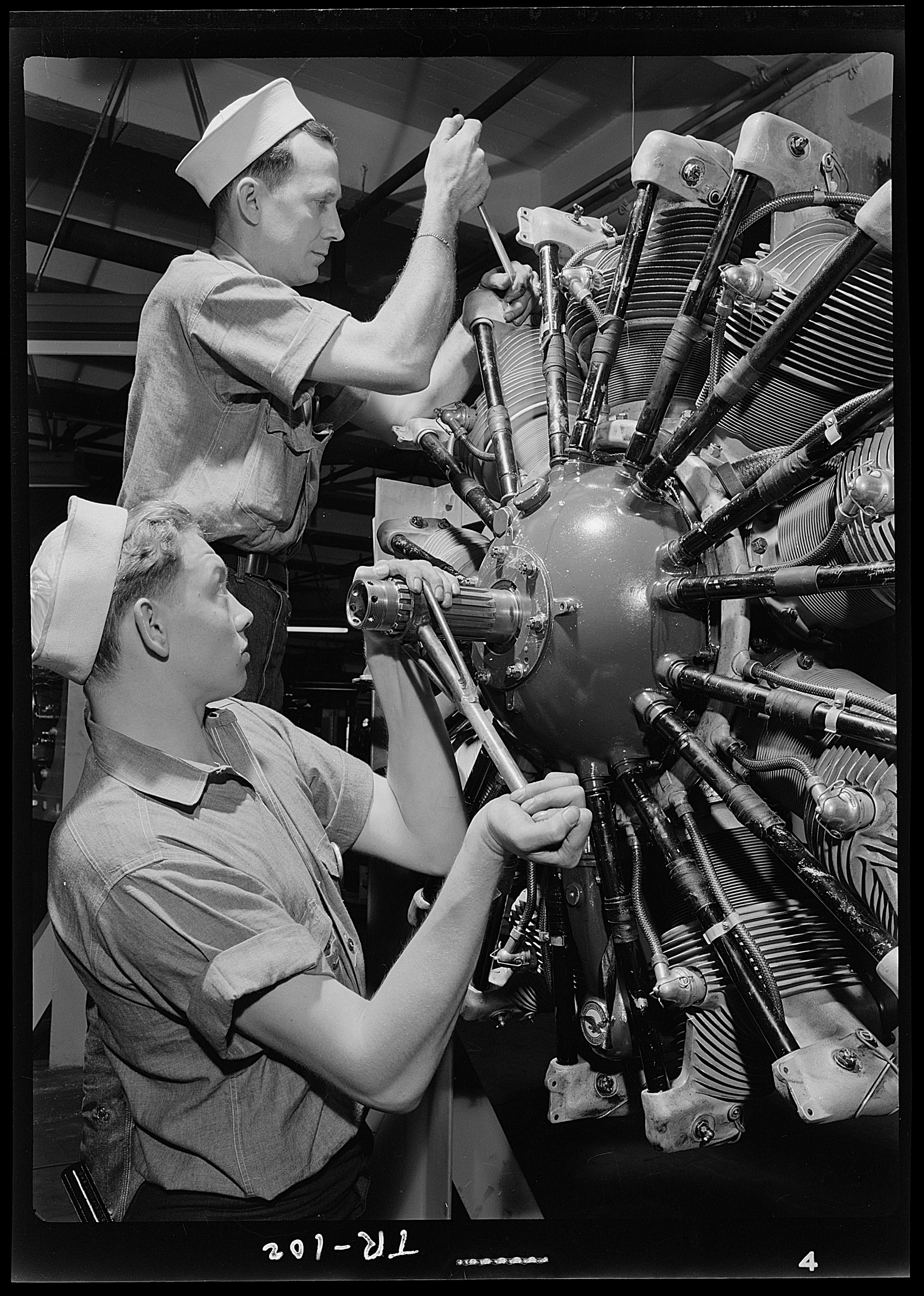
Aviation machinists mates working on an aircraft engine

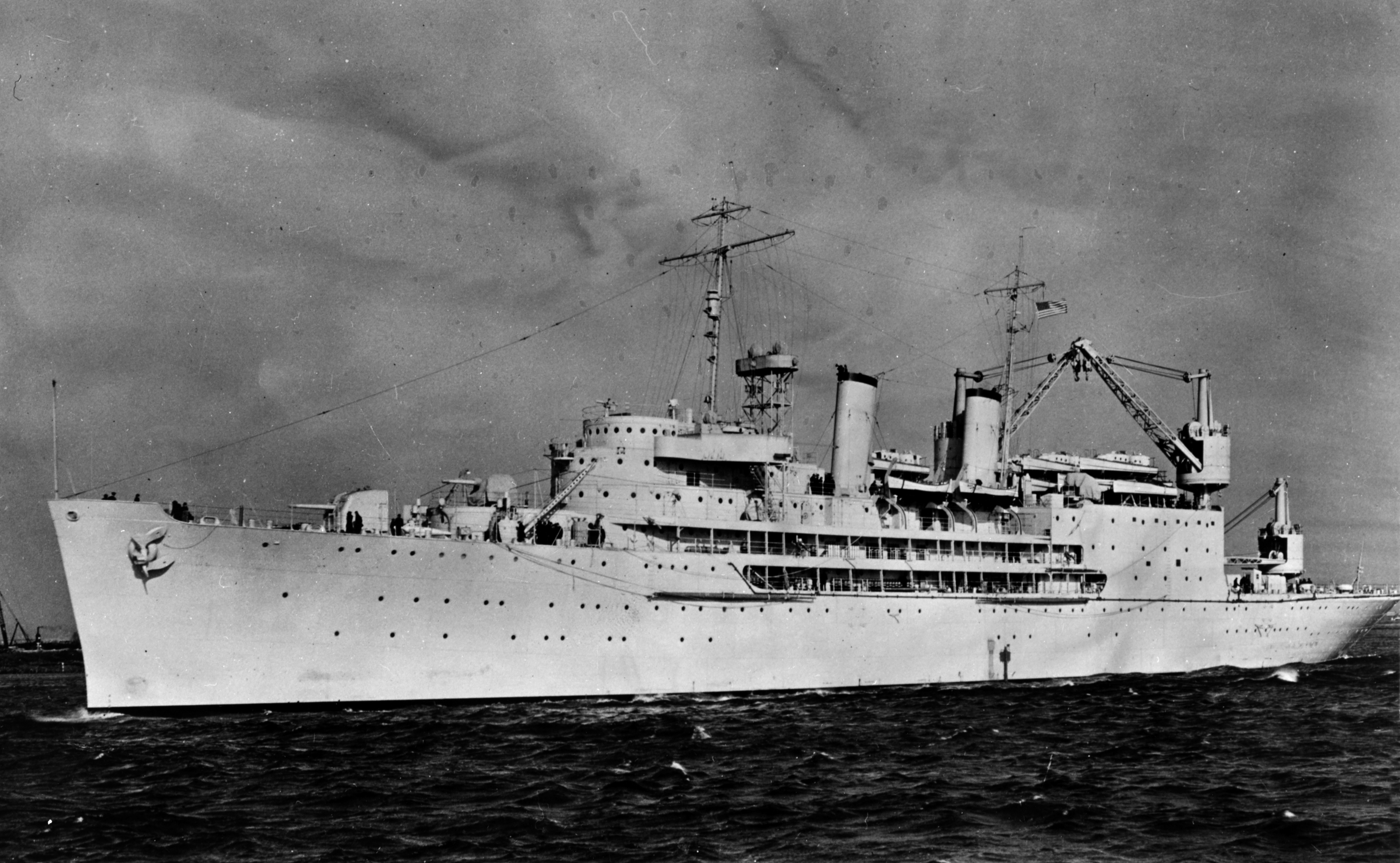
USS Curtiss, an aircraft repair ship

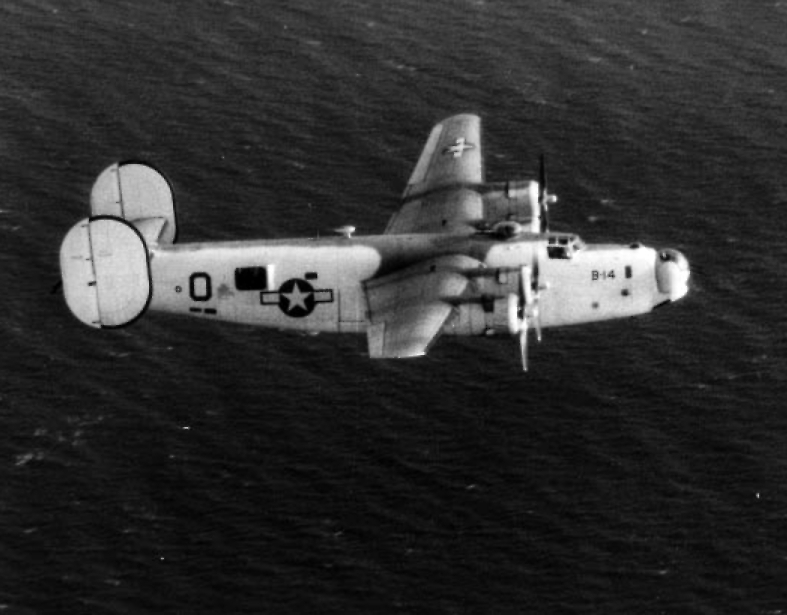
US Navy PB4Y-1 Liberator on patrol with VPB-110 unit

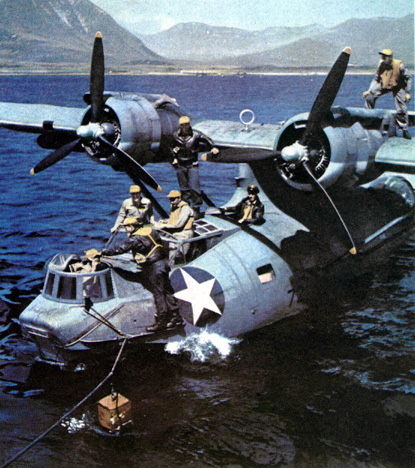
Consolidated PBY Catalina

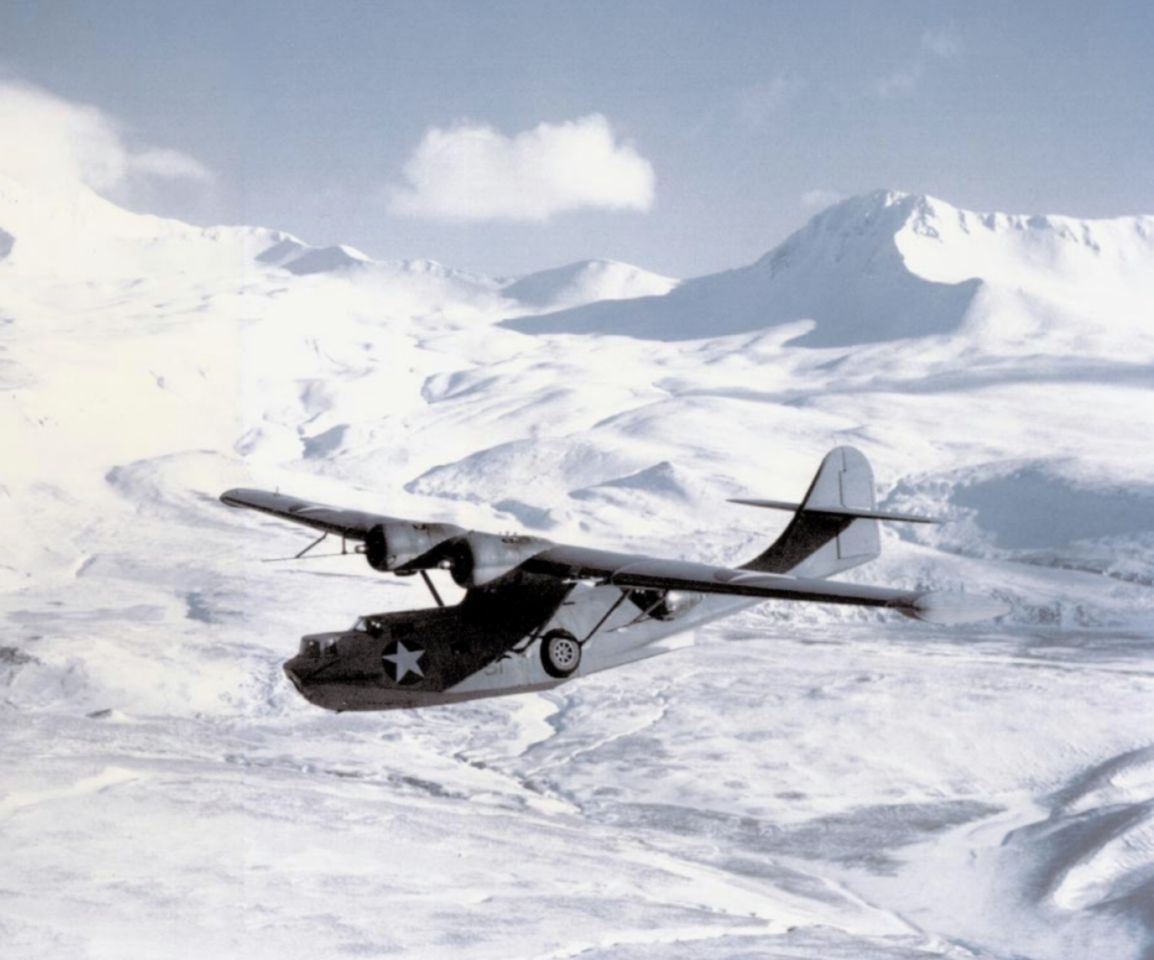
PBY-5A with VP-61 unit over the Aleutians in 1943

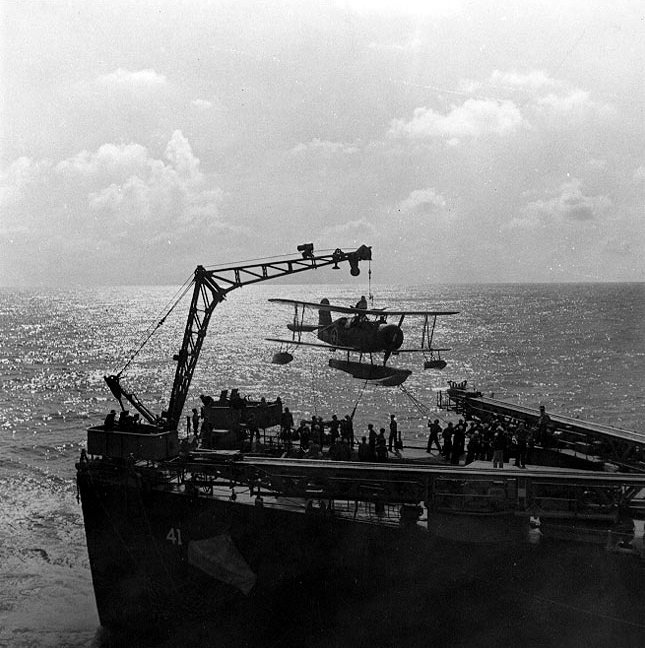
Scoutplane being hoisted on board USS Philadelphia

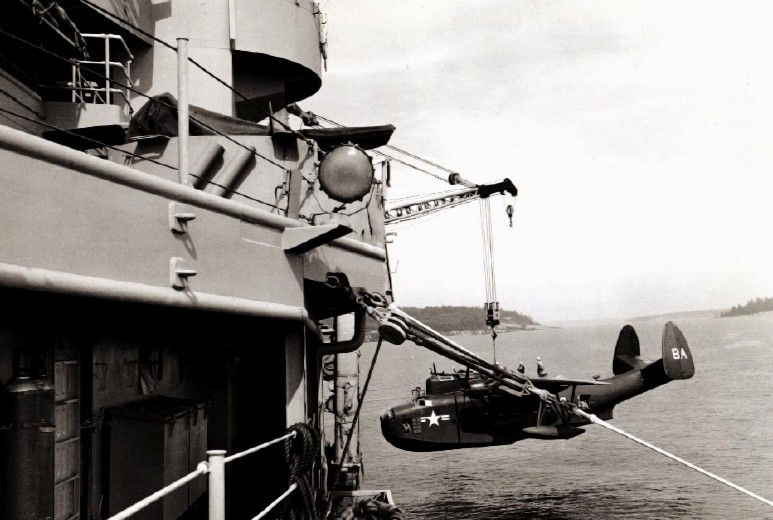
Martin PBM Mariner with the VP-47 unit on hoist

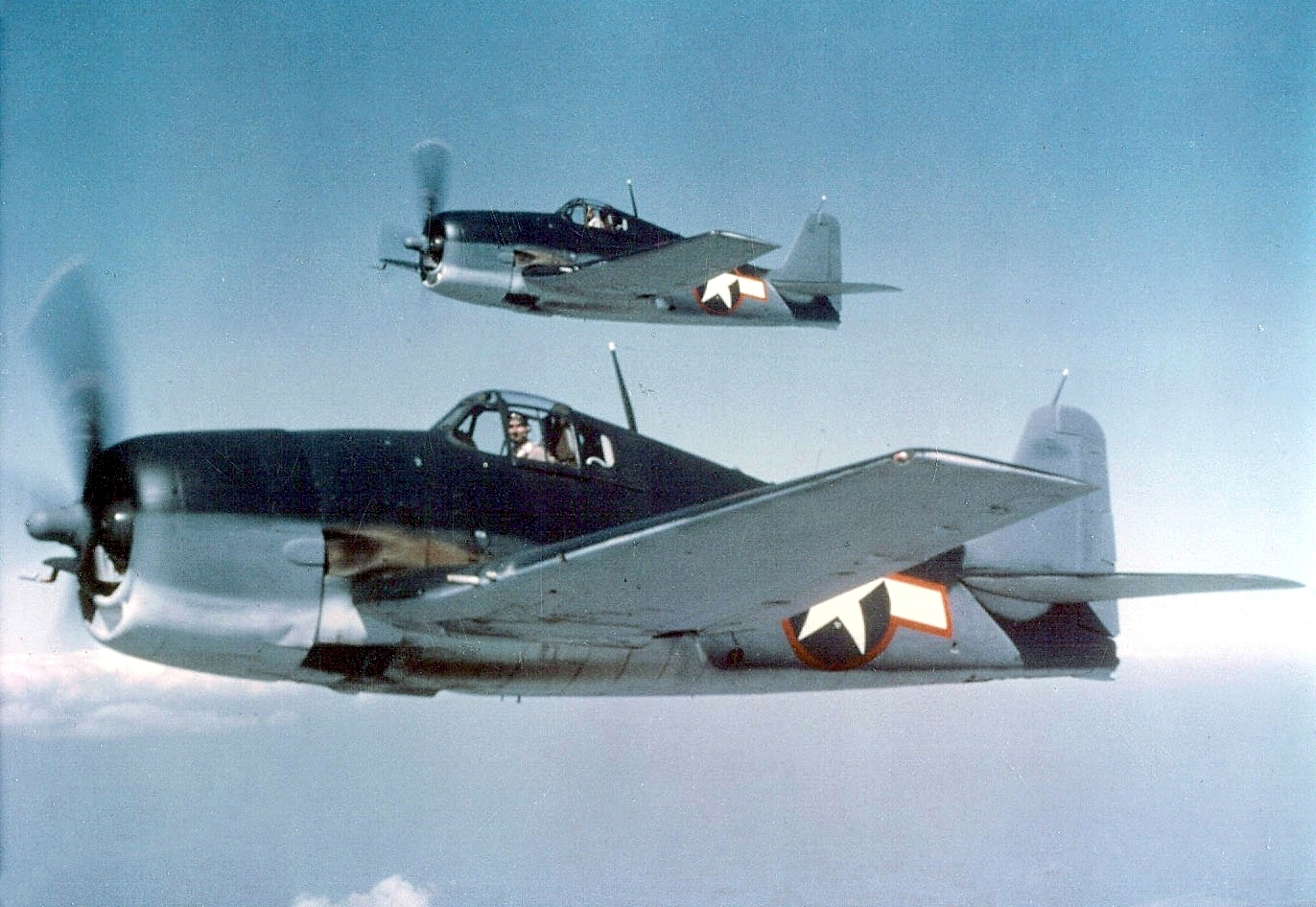
US Navy Grumman F6F Hellcat in 1943

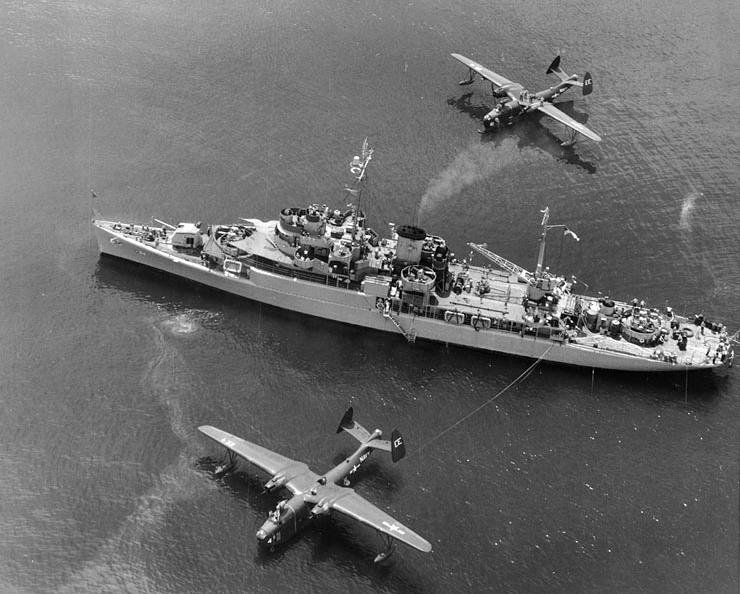
USS Timbalier with two Martin PBM Mariner flying boats

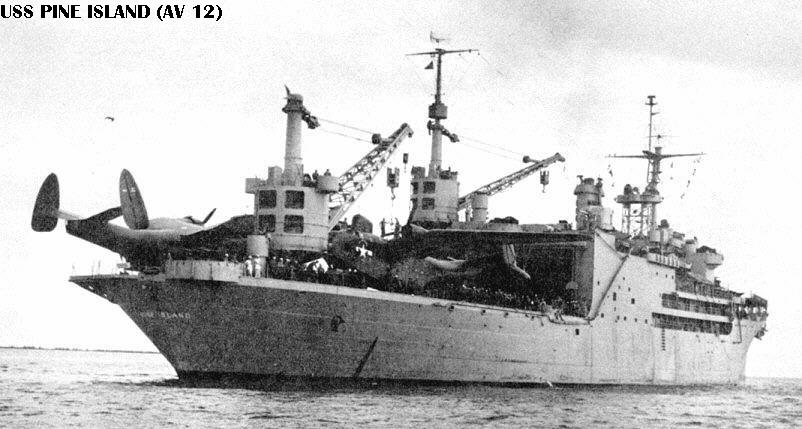
USS Pine Island, a seaplane tender

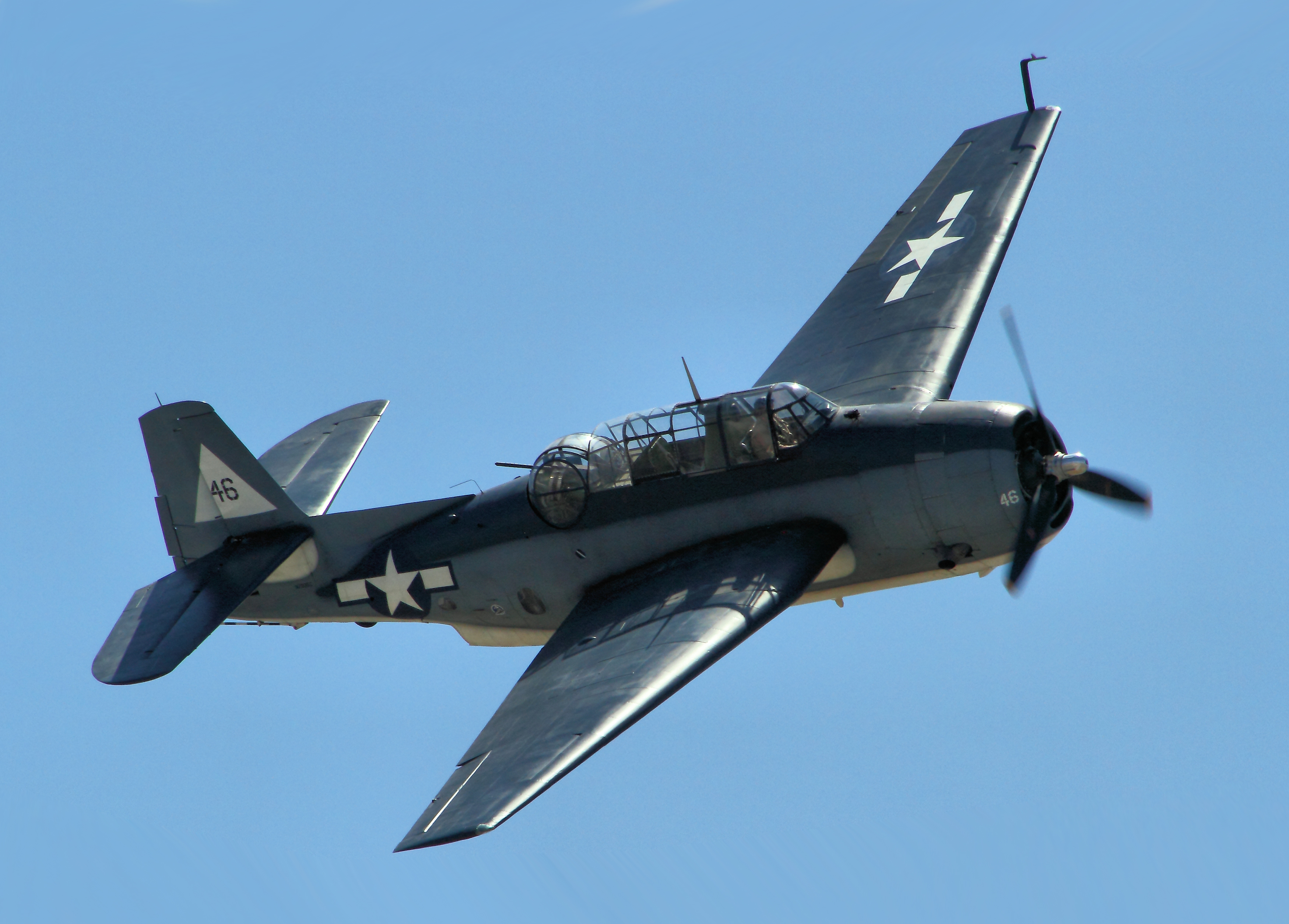
US Navy Grumman TBF Avenger

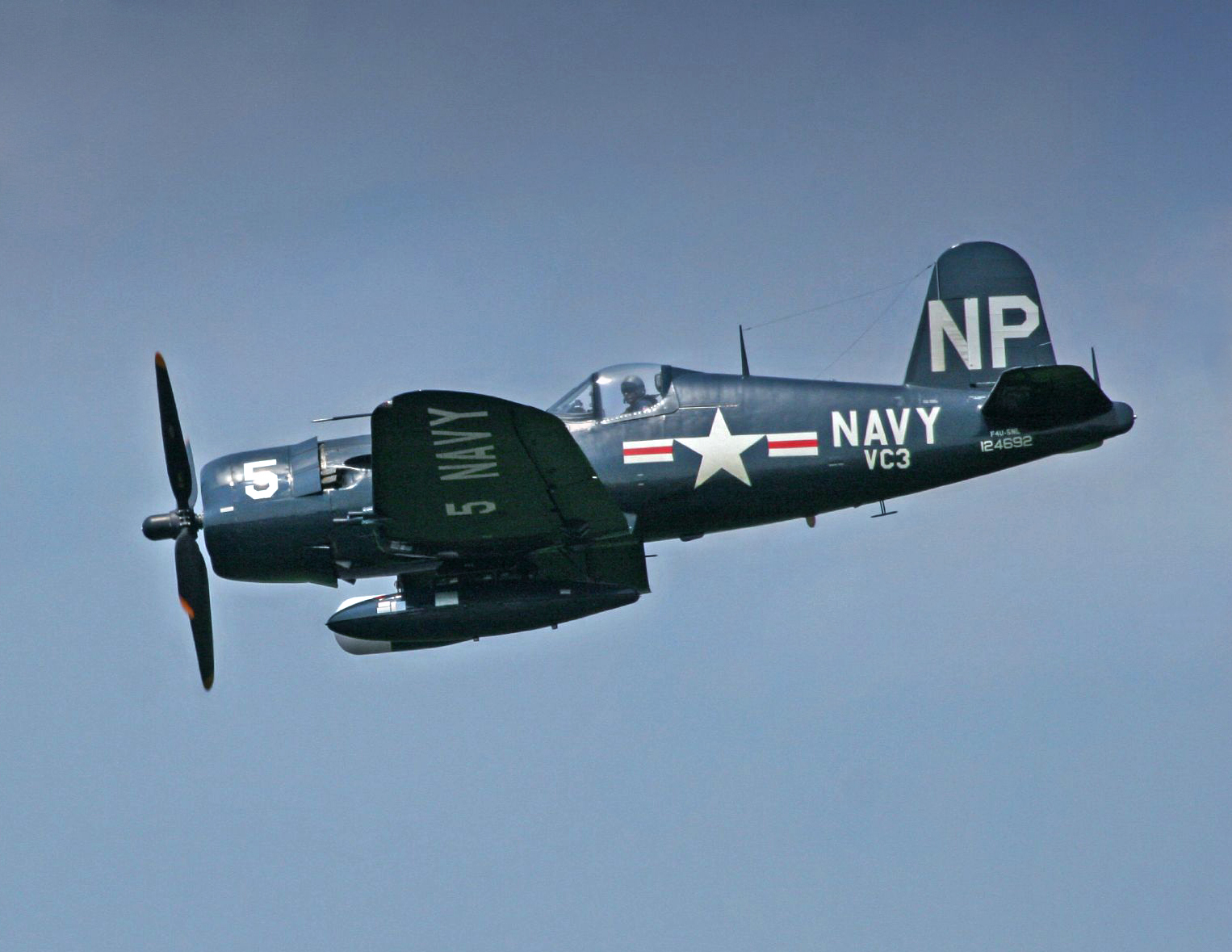
Vought F4U Corsair

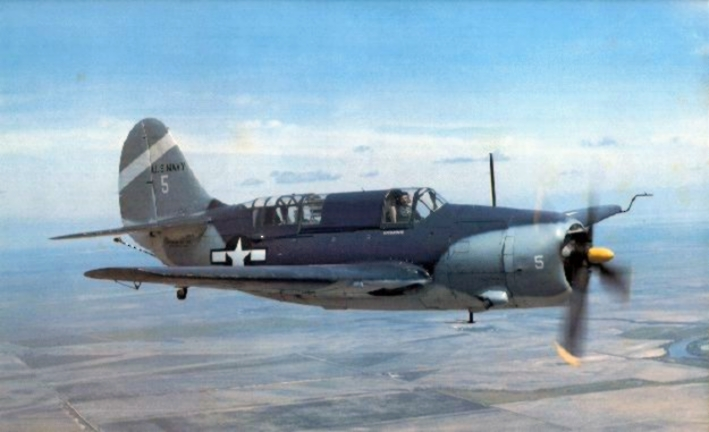
Curtiss SB2C Helldiver warbird in flight

== See also ==
- Aviation machinist's mate
- US Naval Advance Bases
- Espiritu Santo Naval Base
- Naval Advance Base Saipan
- Naval Base Noumea
- Repair ship
