= Carrier Aircraft Service Units =

United States Navy aircraft repair unit

Carrier Aircraft Service Unit
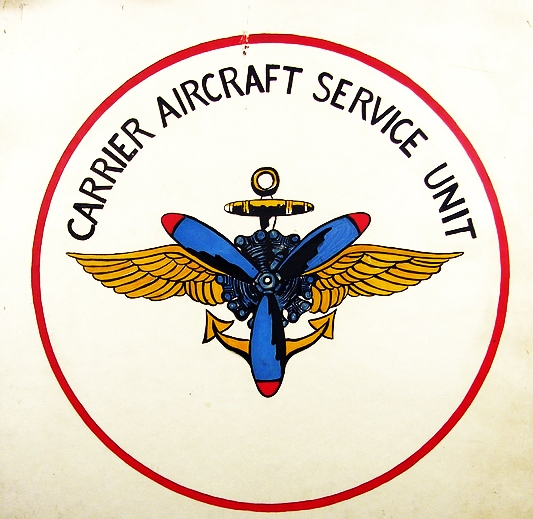
- Carrier Aircraft Service Unit Logo
- Branch: U.S. Navy
- Type: World War II Aircraft Service Unit
- Role: Military engineering
- Nickname: CASU
- Colors: United States Navy
- Engagements: Guadalcanal, Bougainville, Los Negros, Guam, Peleliu, Tarawa, Kwajalein, Saipan, Tinian, Iwo Jima, Philippines, Okinawa

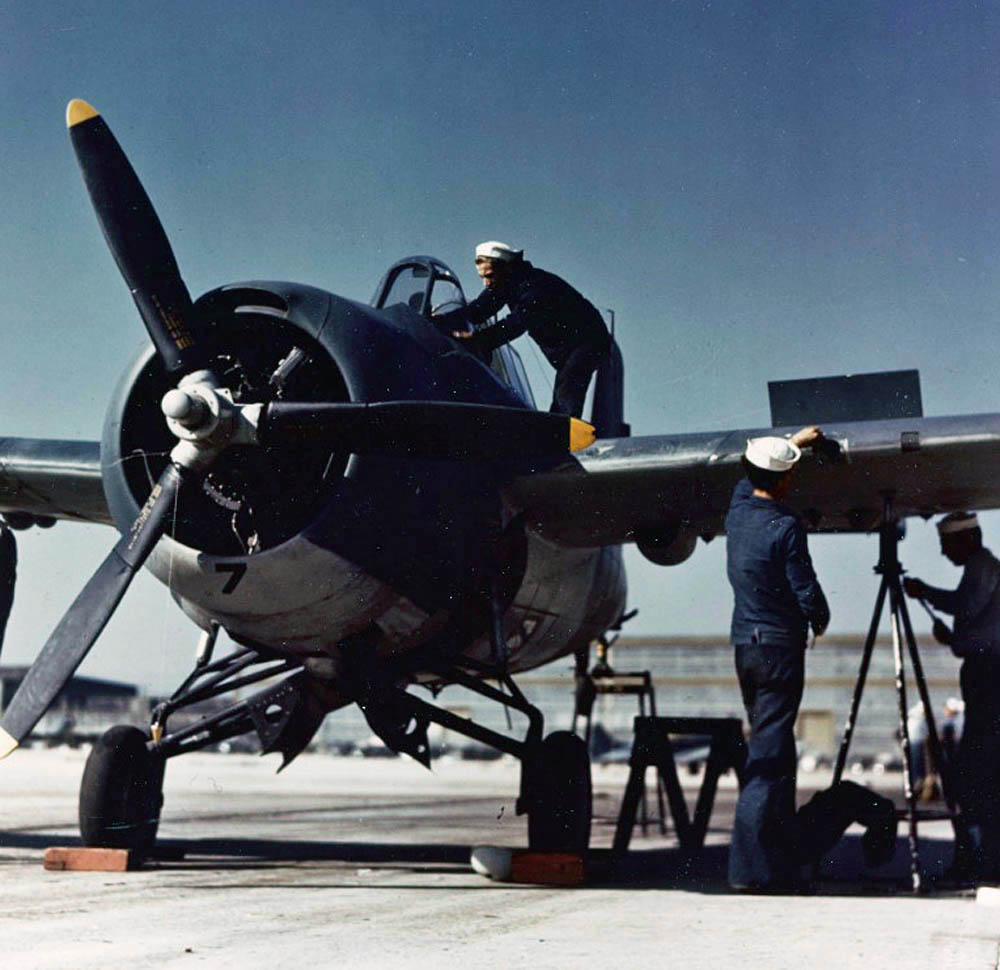
Grumman F4F Wildcat maintenance 1943

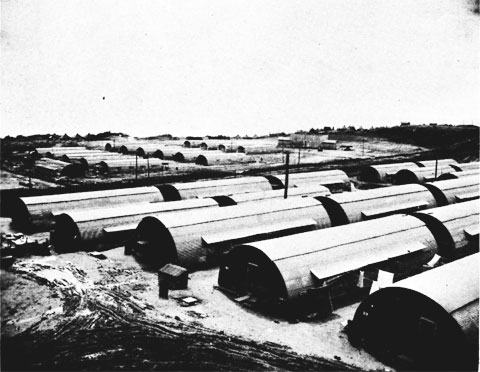
Carrier Aircraft Service Unit 52 Camp and Administration on Naval Base Iwo Jima in 1945

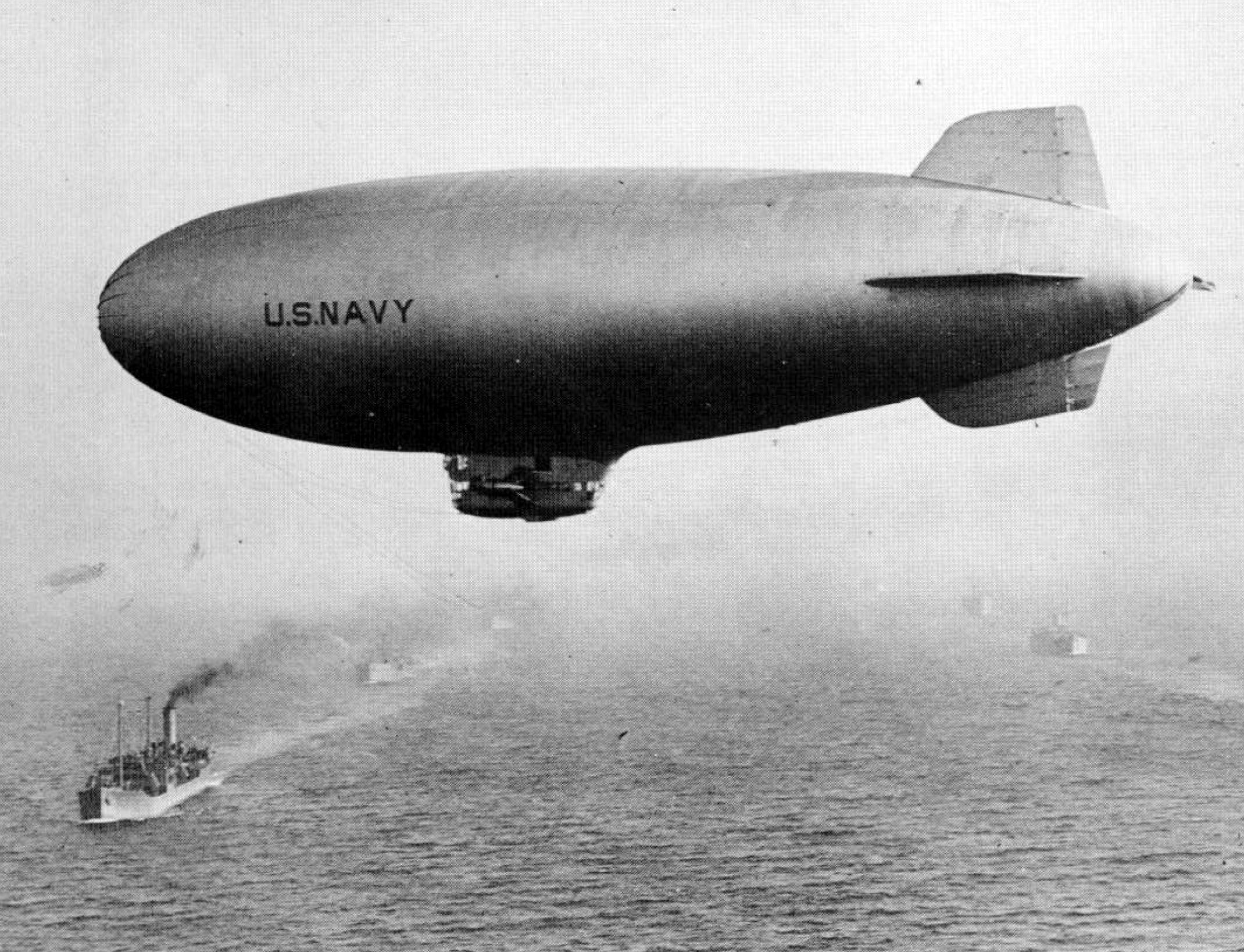
US Navy K-class blimp

Carrier Aircraft Service Units (CASU) were United States Navy units formed during World War II for the Pacific War to support naval aircraft operations. From 1942 to 1946, 69 Carrier Aircraft Service Units were formed to repair and maintain aircraft. The first unit was deployed to Naval Station Pearl Harbor. The CASU-11, was deployed on January 22, 1943, at Naval Air Station San Diego. During the war the Navy lacked enough aircraft carriers to complete all the operational requirements.

== History ==
In 1942, Ewa Field at Naval Base Hawaii became a major United States Marine Corps and US Navy aviation training facility for Carrier Aircraft Service Units (CASU). Flight crews and air mechanics trained at Ewa Field for the upcoming Pacific War, including Battles at Wake Island, Guadalcanal, and Midway. Aircraft mechanics of Carrier Aircraft Service Units traveled with the island hopping troops as new airfields were built across the Western Pacific Ocean. The many aircraft fighting and patrolling the South West Pacific theatre of war needed ongoing maintenance. CASU-11 was deployed for three years and nine months. CASU-11 decommissioned on November 1, 1946, at Naval Air Facility Yonabaru Okinawa with the war over. In that time CASU-11 traveled over 1,700 troops worked in CASU-11 and the unit traveled over 27,000 miles. CASU-11 worked on Naval planes at Naval Air Stations from Guadalcanal to Okinawa. Carrier Aircraft Service Units worked on seaplanes, fighter planes, bombers torpedo planes, dive bombers, and later night fighters. Out of necessity Carrier Aircraft Service Units sometimes worked on marine craft, United States Army Air Forces and other allied aircraft. Carrier Aircraft Service Units worked on aircraft carrier planes and land-based planes. Some Carrier Aircraft Service Units worked in United States on training aircraft and other planes. If needed a Carrier Aircraft Service Unit could be redesignated into a Combat Aircraft Service Unit, Scout Observation Service unit or Patrol Service units.

- Carrier aircraft used during World War II by US Navy: (years used) (number built)
- Douglas TBD Devastator - torpedo bomber (1937–1944) (130)
- Grumman F4F Wildcat - fighter (1941–1945) (7,885)
- Grumman TBF Avenger - torpedo bomber (1941–1948) (9,839)
- Grumman F6F Hellcat - fighter-bomber (1942–1947) (12,275)
- Curtiss SB2C Helldiver - dive bomber (1943–1953) (7,140)
- Vought F4U Corsair - fighter-bomber (1943–1953) (12,571)

== Combat Aircraft Service Units ==
Combat Aircraft Service Unit, CASU (F), units operated out of US Naval Forward Advance Bases and were noted as CASU (F), [F] indicated Forward operations.

== Scout Observation Service units ==
Scout Observation Service units, (SOSU) were like Carrier Aircraft Service Units but specialized on scout observation planes. Scout observation planes operated from battleships, cruisers and a few destroyers.

== Patrol Service units ==
Patrol Service units, (PatSU) were like Carrier Aircraft Service Units but specialized on maintaining land-based patrol aircraft. These units specialized on the Navy's land-based PB4Y-1 Liberator patrol bomber and later the Consolidated PB4Y-2 Privateer aircraft.

== Blimp HedRon ==
Blimp HedRon, Blimp Headquarters Squadron, were Navy units that maintained US Navy blimps in the Lighter-than‑air (LTA) service. Blimp HedRon operated much like Carrier Aircraft Service Units but specialized in fabric damage and helium handling. Lighter-than‑air operations extended into the South Atlantic and Caribbean areas (for example from Naval Base Trinidad).

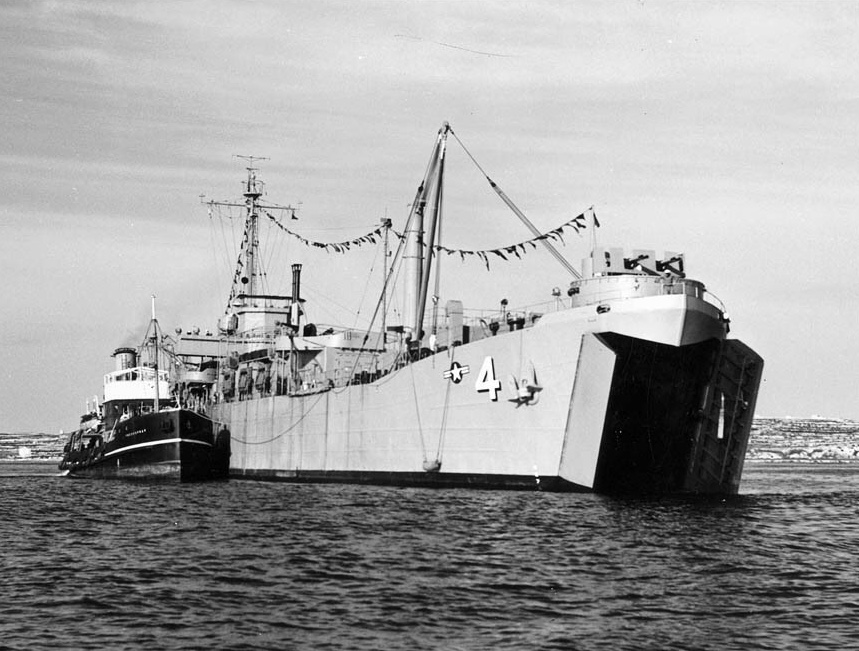
USS Chloris (ARVE-4), an Aircraft repair ship

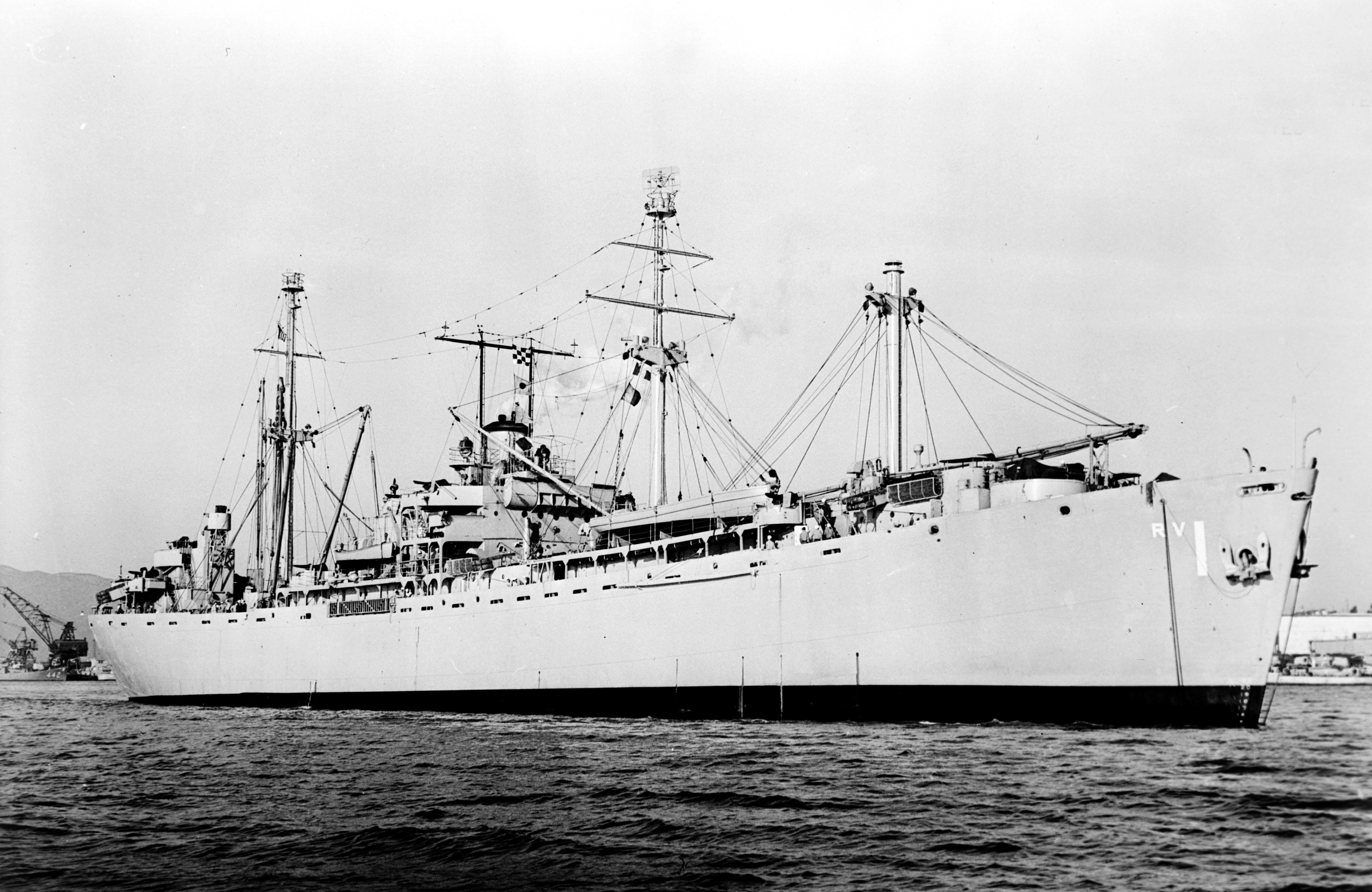
USS Chourre (ARV-1), Aircraft repair ship

== Aircraft repair ships ==
Some cargo ships and LSTs were converted into Aircraft repair ships to aid in the repair needs of the island hopping campaign.

== Seaplane Tender ==
The US Navy operated a fleet of Seaplane tender used to maintain the many US navy Seaplanes. Some Seaplane tenders were cargo ships converted into Seaplane tenders. The USS Curtiss (AV-4) was the first ship built to be a Seaplane tender. Seaplane tender serviced and repaired seaplanes used in forward bases used for long-range patrol. Seaplane Tenders were able to do repair and maintenance and had all the supplies needed to operate in remote forward bases for months. Once and if a land-based forward base was built the Seaplane tender could move on to a more forward base. Seaplane tenders acted as barracks, supply depots, workshops, air mechanic and control towers for the planes.

== Parts ==
The key to the Service Units was the supply of parts, keeping supply depots stocked with the needed parts. Both the UN Navy and the World War II United States Merchant Navy kept parts from the states flowing to the Advance Bases where they were needed.

== Gallery ==
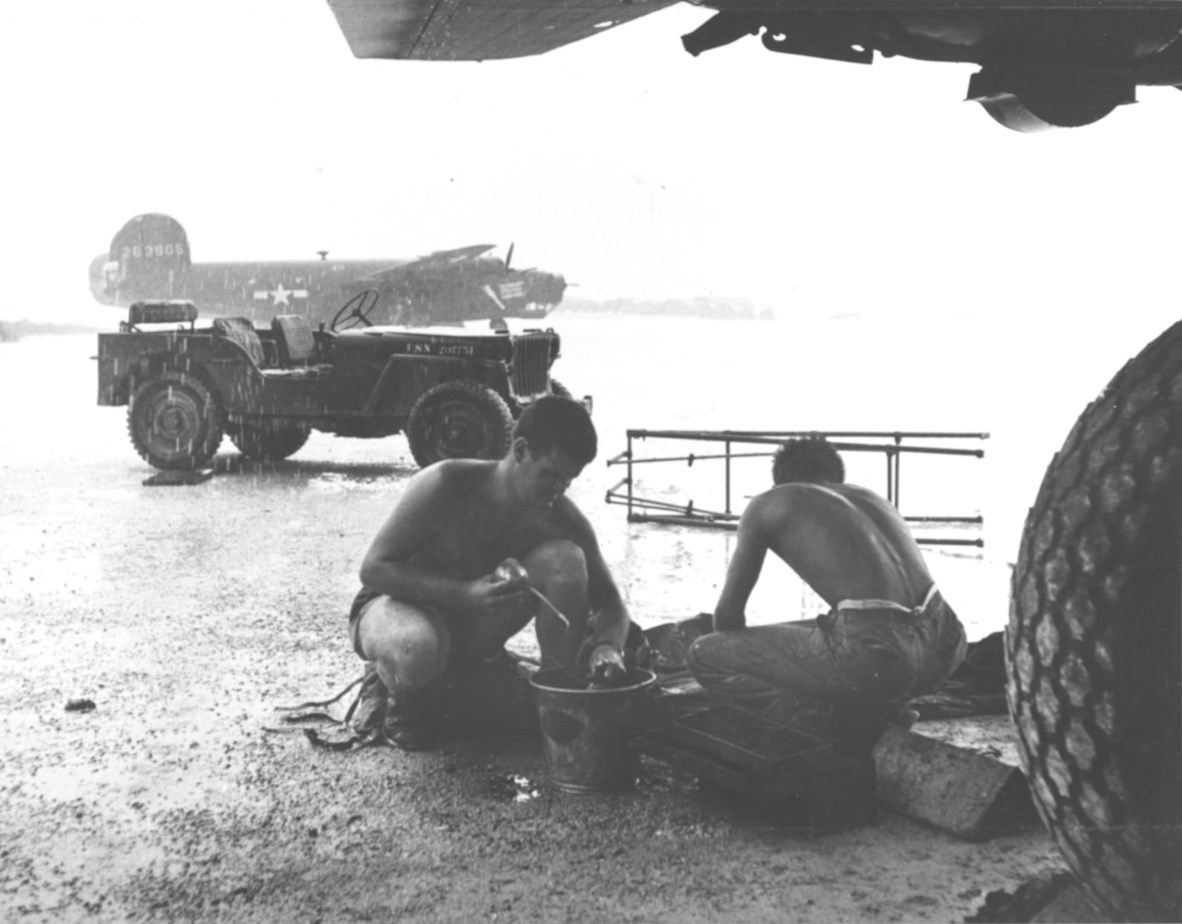
US Navy maintenance crews VB-106 clean engine parts under an airplane wing while raining at Momote Airfiled in March 1944 at Manus Naval Base

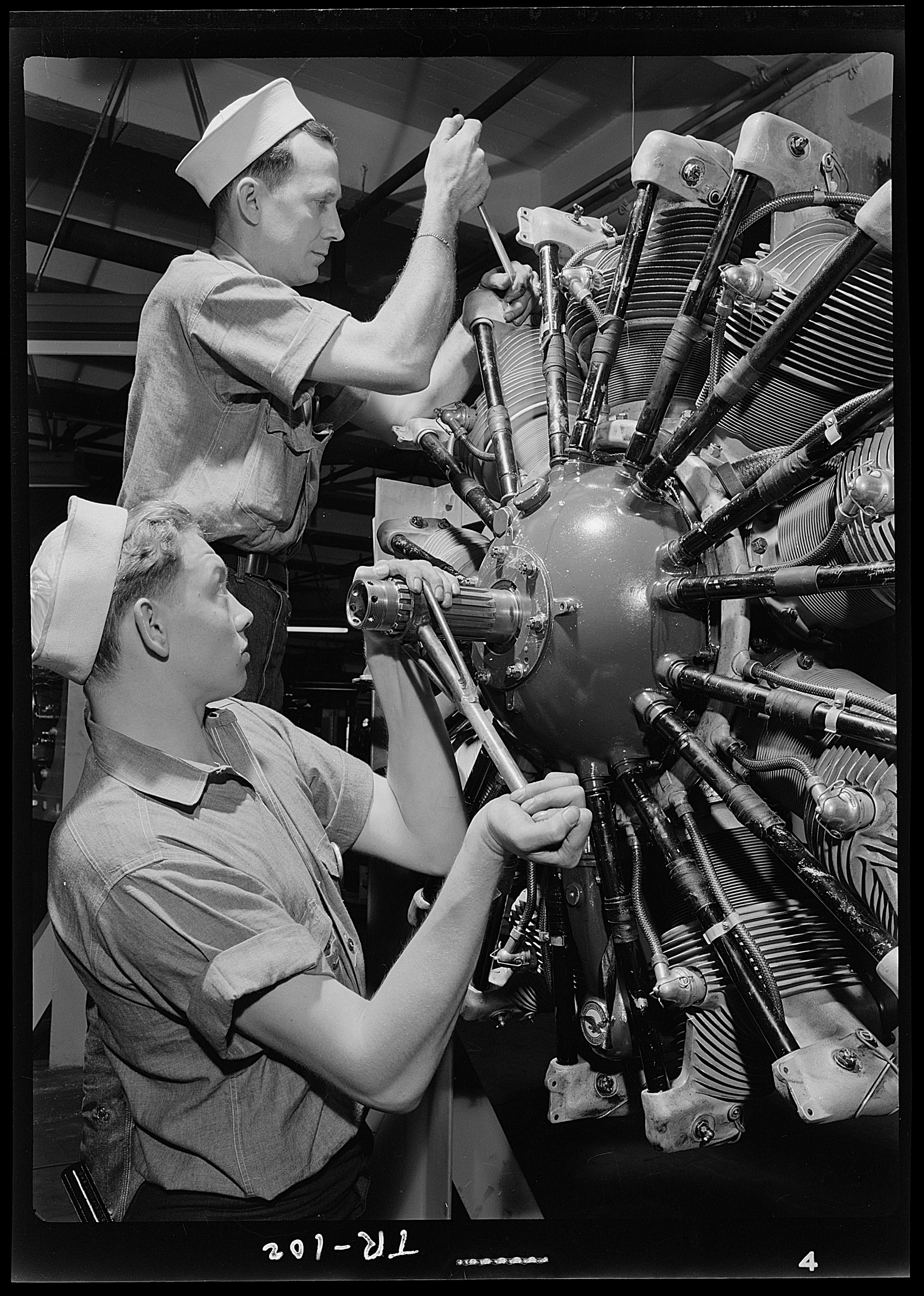
Aviation machinists mates working on an aircraft engine

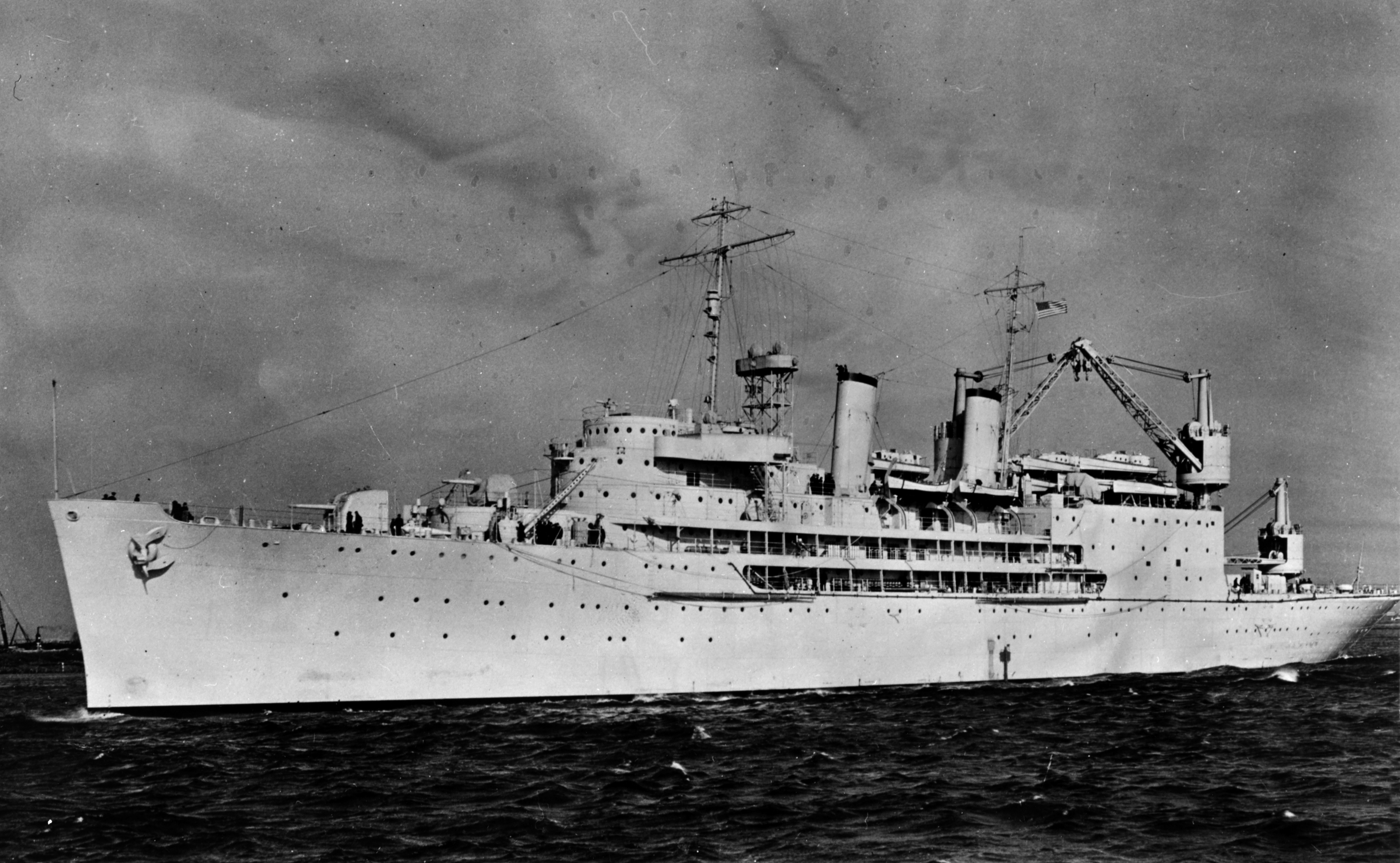
USS Curtiss (AV-4)

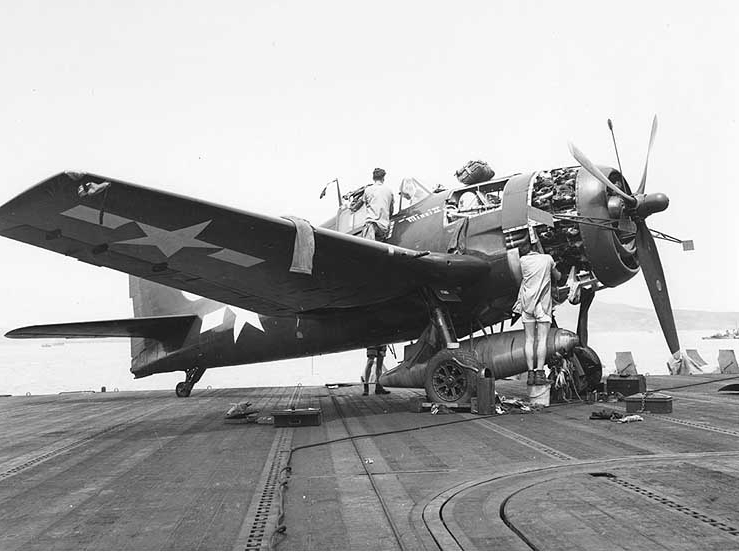
Grumman F6F Hellcat maintenance on USS Essex (CV-9) in July 1944

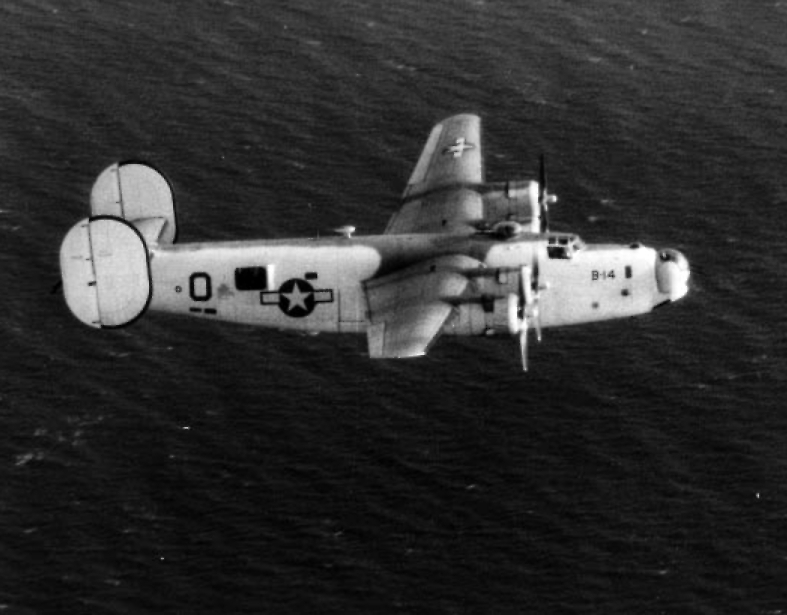
US Navy PB4Y-1 Liberator on patrol with VPB-110 unit

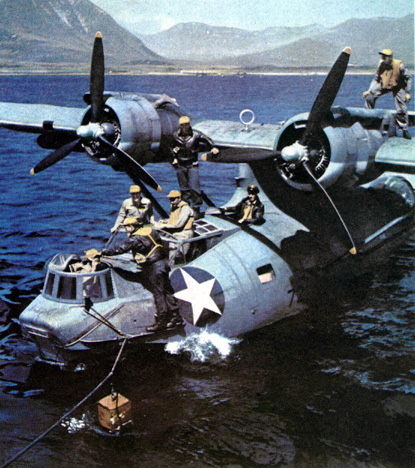
Consolidated PBY Catalina

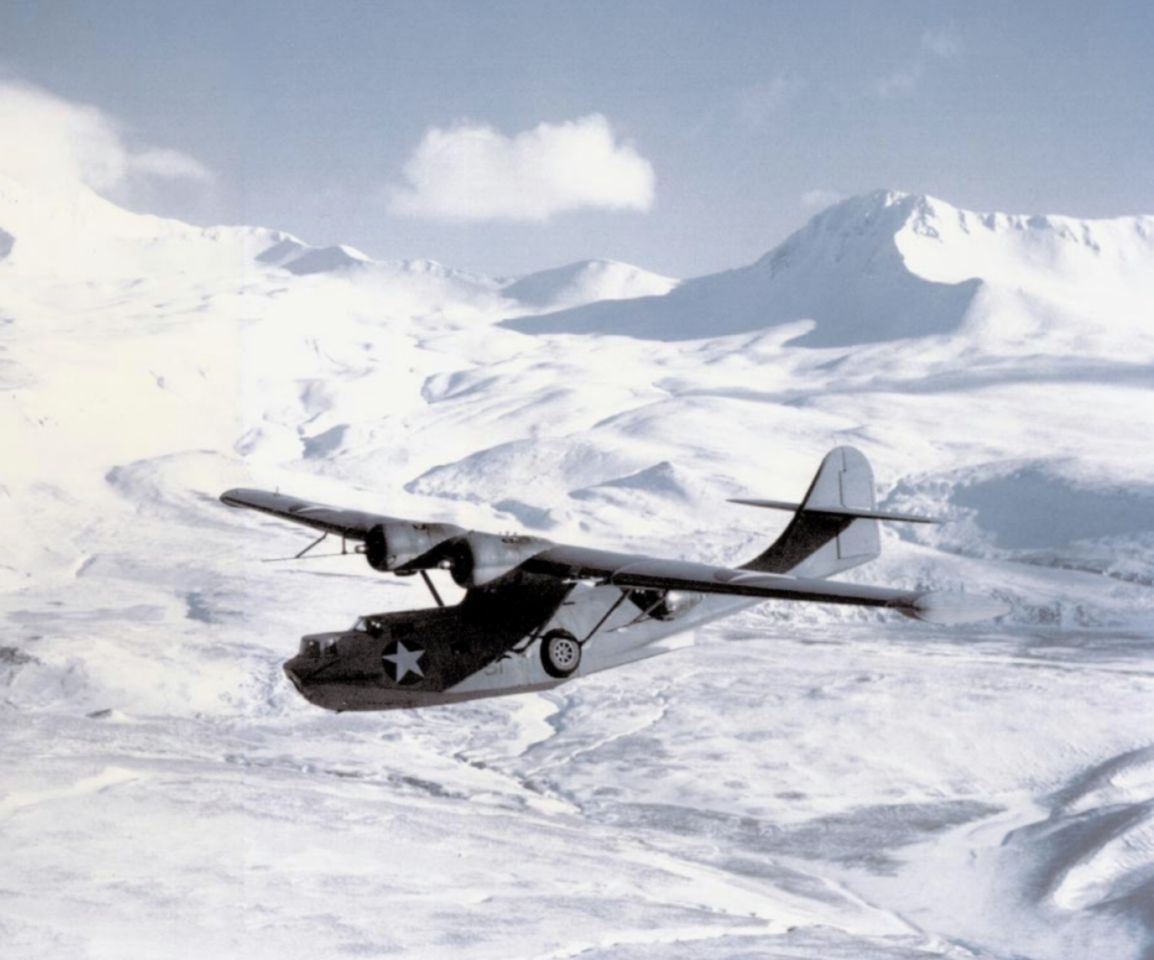
PBY-5A with VP-61 unit over the Aleutians in 1943

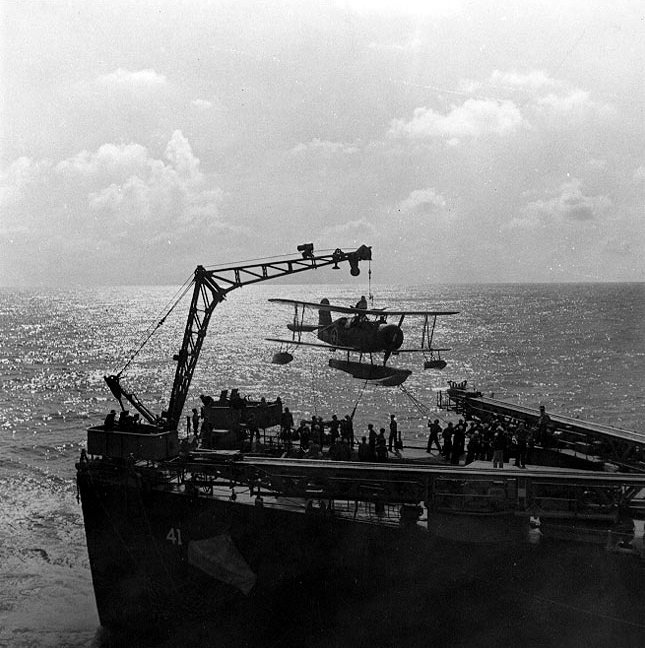
Scoutplane being hoisted on board USS Philadelphia

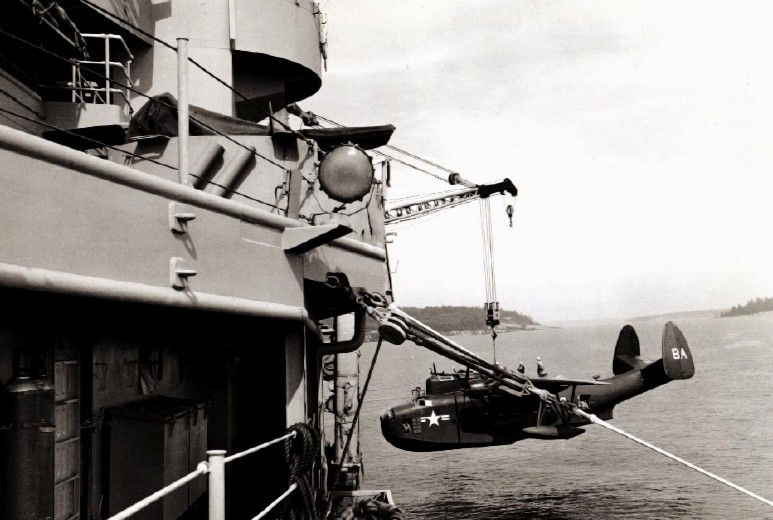
Martin PBM Mariner with the VP-47 unit on hoist

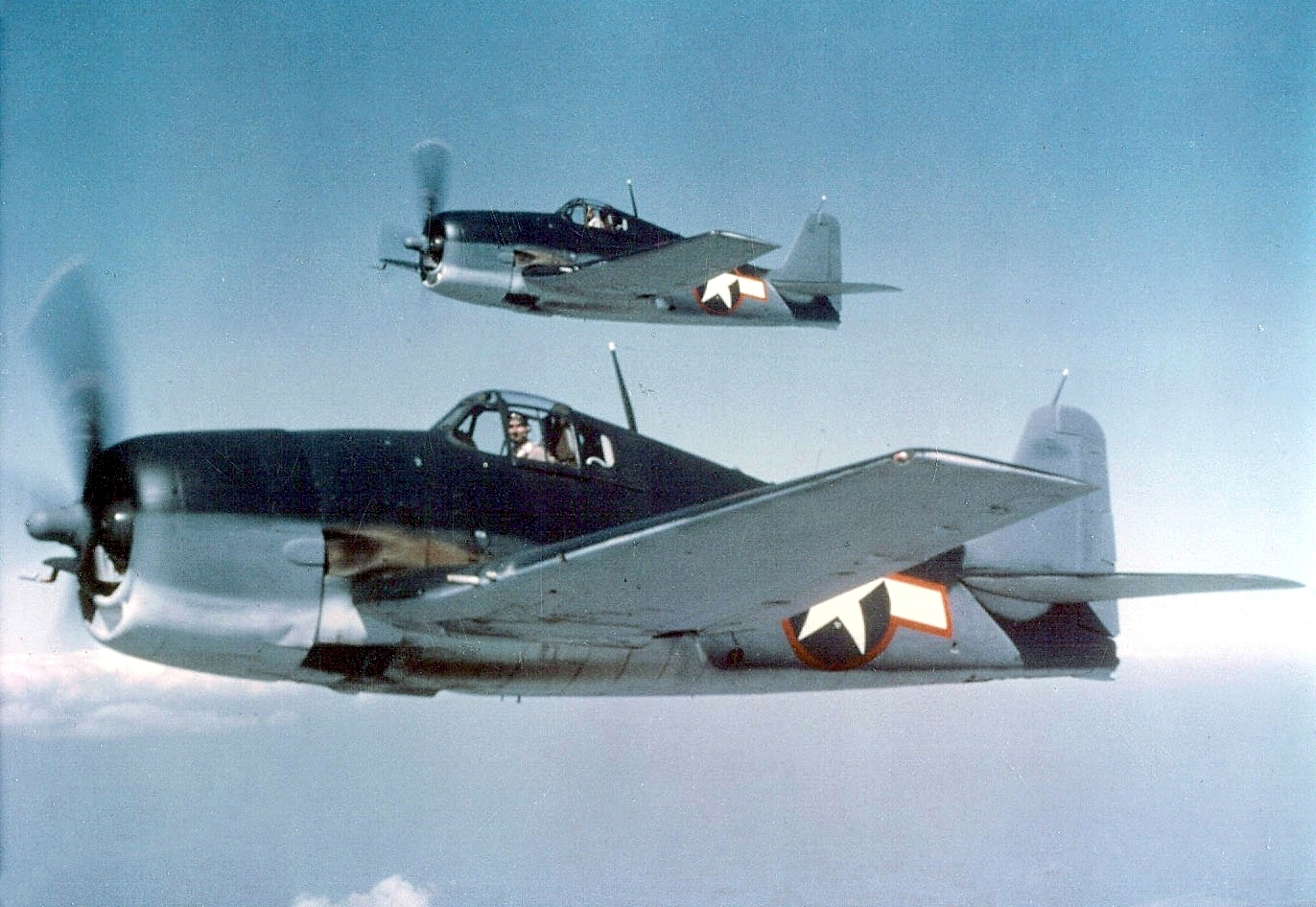
US Navy Grumman F6F Hellcat in 1943

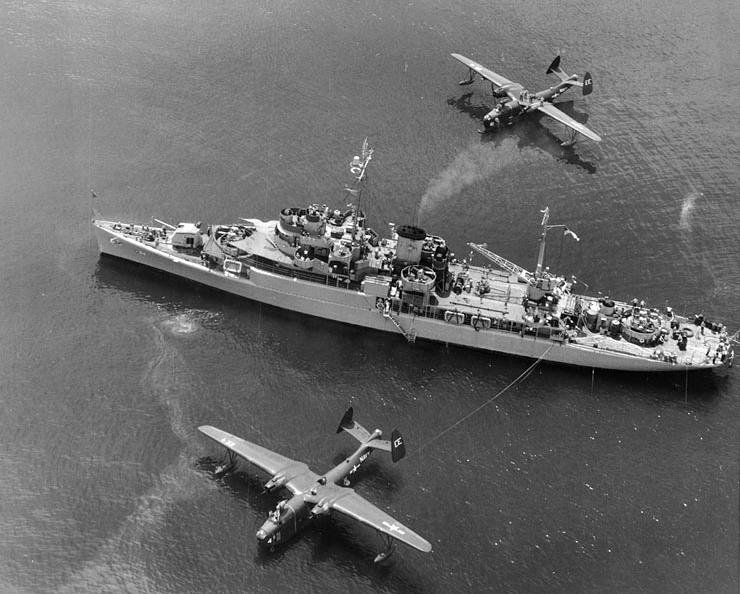
USS Timbalier (AVP-54) with two Martin PBM Mariner flying boats

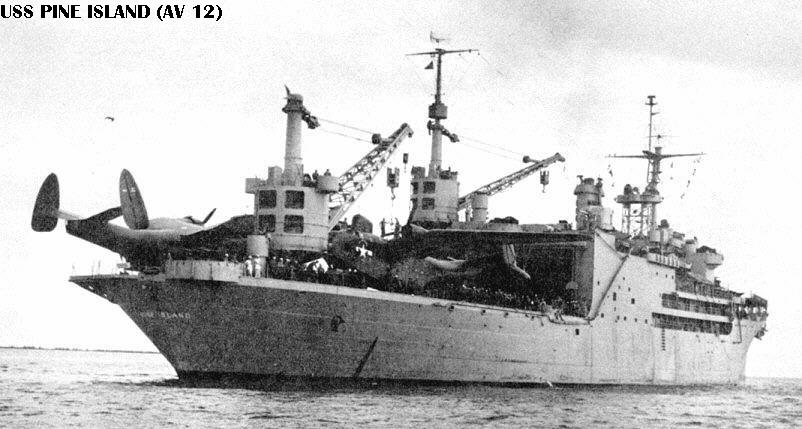
USS Pine Island (AV-12) a Seaplane Tender

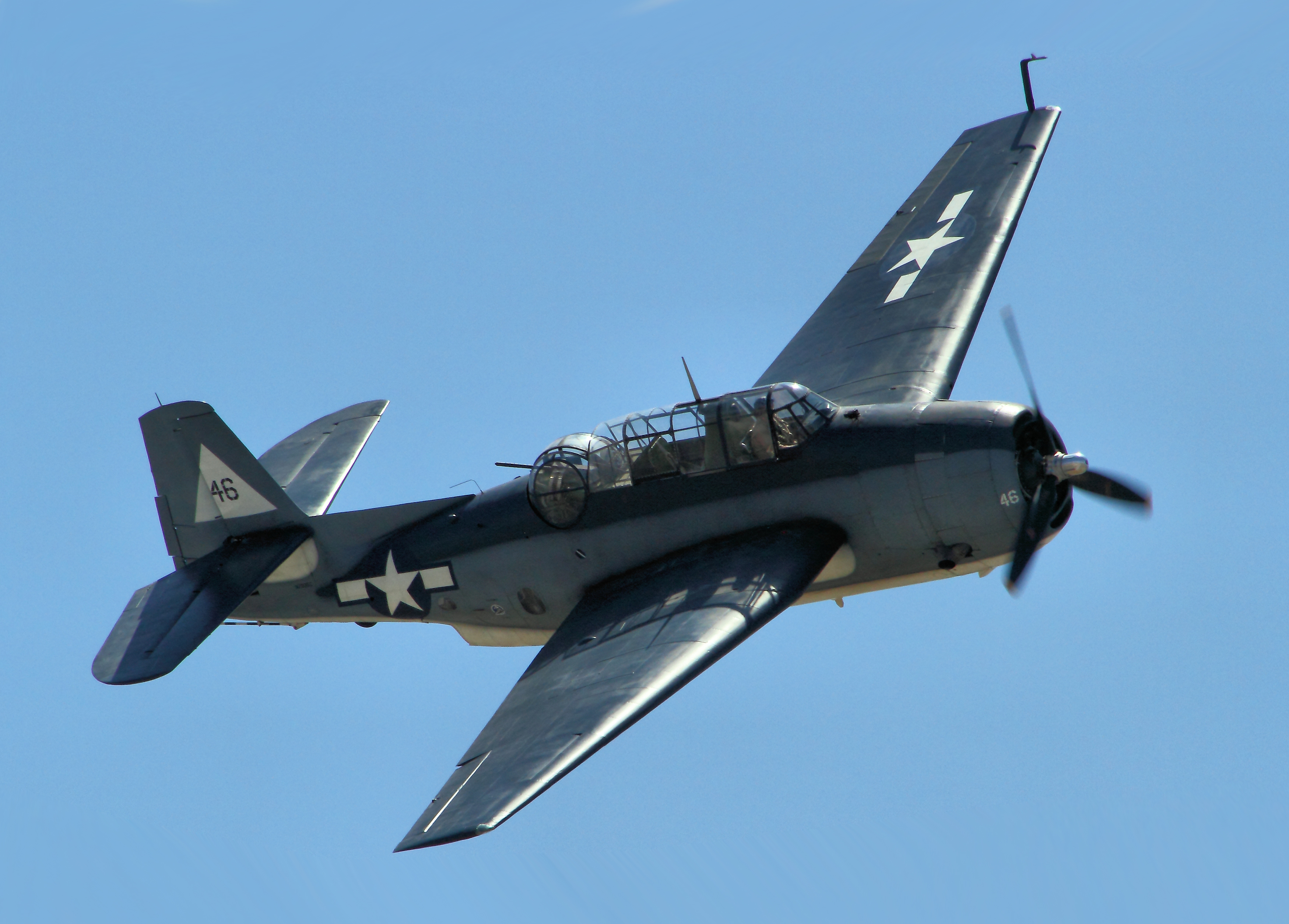
US Navy Grumman TBF Avenger

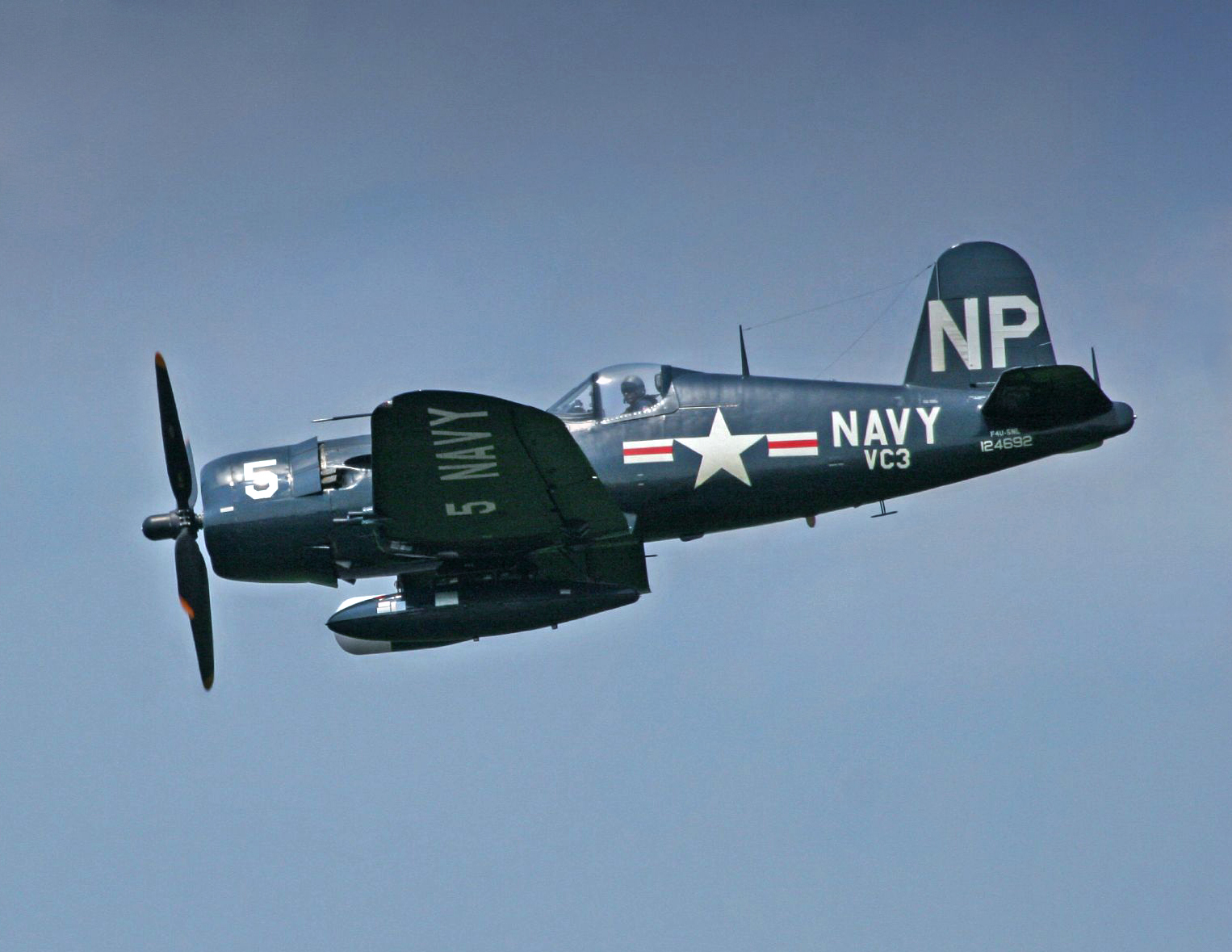
Vought F4U Corsair

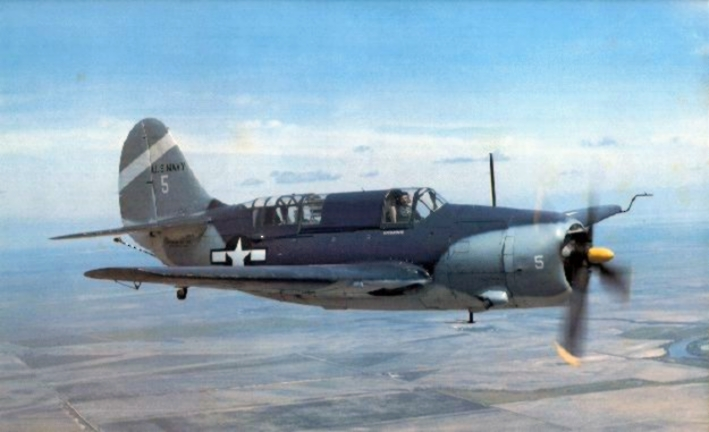
Curtiss SB2C Helldiver warbird in flight

== See also ==
- Aviation machinist's mate
- Operation Ivory Soap
- US Naval Advance Bases
- U.S. Naval Base Subic Bay
- Espiritu Santo Naval Base
- Naval Advance Base Saipan
- Naval Base Noumea
- US Navy airships during World War II
