= Aventinus-class aircraft repair ship =

Class of aircraft repair ships of the United States Navy

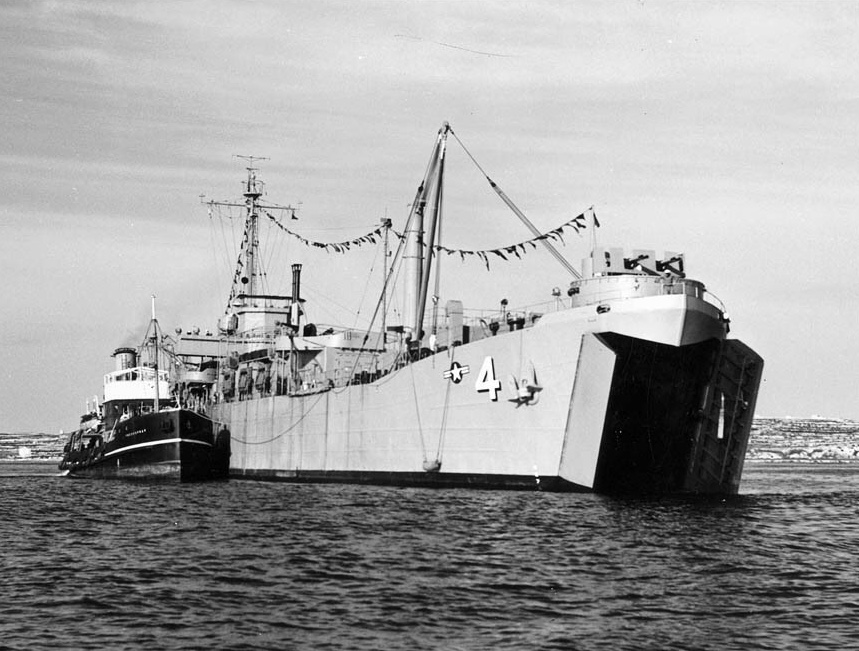
- USS Chloris

Class overview
- Name: Aventinus class
- Builders: American Bridge Co.
- Operators: United States Navy; Chilean Navy
- Preceded by: Chourre class
- Succeeded by: Fabius class
- Built: 1945
- In commission: 1945–1955
- Planned: 2
- Completed: 2
- Retired: 2

General characteristics
- Type: Aircraft repair ship
- Displacement: 2,110 long tons (2,144 t), light; 3,960 long tons (4,024 t), full load
- Length: 328 ft (100 m)
- Beam: 50 ft (15 m)
- Draft: 11 ft 2 in (3.40 m)
- Installed power: 1,800 hp (1,342 kW)
- Propulsion: 2 × General Motors 12-567A diesel engines; Single Falk Main Reduction Gear; 2 × shafts; 2 × rudders
- Speed: 11.6 knots (21.5 km/h; 13.3 mph)
- Boats & landing craft carried: 2 × LCVPs
- Troops: 16 officers, 147 enlisted men
- Complement: 20 officers, 225–240 enlisted men
- Armament: 2 × quad Bofors 40 mm guns; 12 × Oerlikon 20 mm cannons

The Aventinus-class aircraft repair ship was a class of repair ships that were operated by the United States Navy during World War II.

== Design ==
Aventinus-class was a ship class consisting of two modified LST-542-class tank landing ships, where they serve as aircraft repair ships in late 1945. They have the same hull measurements with changes taken place on their armaments and displacements, alongside a workshop to carry out their role. Only LST-1092 (Aventinus) and LST-1094 (Chloris) were chosen to be modified and redesignated ARVE, with "E" standing for aircraft "Engine".

Both ships survived the war and were mothballed for a short while, before Aventinus was reactivated amid the Korean War in the 1950s. Chile bought Aventinus and renamed her to Aguila (ARV-135).

== Ships in the class ==
Aventinus class
Hull no.	Name	Callsign	Builder	Laid Down	Launched	Commissioned	Decommissioned	Fate
ARVE-3	Aventinus	NIQP	American Bridge Co.	8 January 1945	24 March 1945	30 May 1945	4 April 1952	Transferred to Chile and renamed Aguila (ARV-135), 1963
ARVE-4	Chloris	NIQR	American Bridge Co.	17 January 1945	21 April 1945	19 June 1945	9 December 1955	Sold to merchant service as MV Avlon, 1977
