= USS Webster =

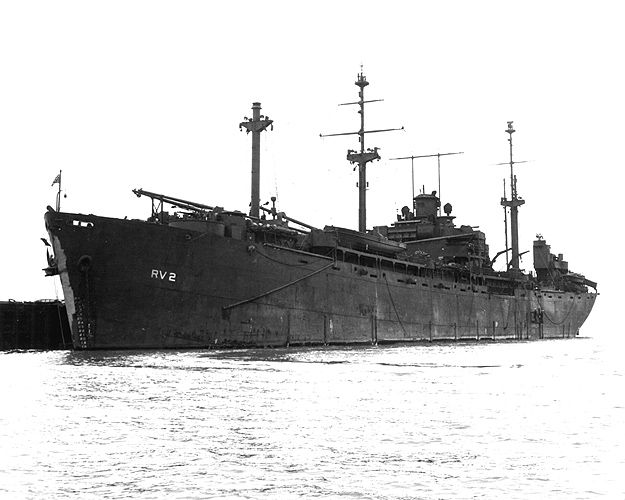
- USS Webster moored pierside at Bethlehem Key Highway Shipyard and Fort McHenry, Baltimore, MD., circa March 1945.

History

United States
- Name: Webster
- Namesake: Walter Wynne Webster
- Builder: Bethlehem Shipbuilding Corporation
- Laid down: 1 July 1944
- Launched: 5 August 1944
- Sponsored by: Mrs. Walter W. Webster
- Commissioned: 15 May 1945
- Decommissioned: 8 June 1946
- Stricken: 1962
- Fate: Scrapped

General characteristics
- Class & type: Chourre-class aircraft repair ship
- Displacement: 4,023 long tons (4,088 t)
- Length: 441 ft 6 in (134.57 m)
- Beam: 56 ft 11 in (17.35 m)
- Draft: 22 ft 0 in (6.71 m)
- Propulsion: Triple Expansion Machinery, Single Propeller, 2,500 hp (1,864 kW)
- Speed: 12.5 knots (23.2 km/h; 14.4 mph)
- Complement: 578
- Armament: 1 x single 5 in (130 mm) dual purpose gun mount, 1 x quad 40 mm AA gun mount, 2 x twin 40 mm AA gun mounts

USS Webster (ARV-2) was a Chourre-class aircraft repair ship aircraft repair ship that saw service in the United States Navy during World War II.

On 30 March 1944, prior to the beginning of work on her construction, Masbate (ARG-1) was renamed Webster and reclassified ARV-2. The ship's keel was laid down under a Maritime Commission contract (MCE hull 2666) on 1 July 1944 at Baltimore, MD, by the Bethlehem Fairfield Shipyard, Inc. Sponsored by Mrs. Walter W. Webster, the widow of the ship's namesake, the ship was launched on 5 August 1944 and commissioned at Baltimore on 17 March 1945.

After fitting out, Webster departed Baltimore on 22 March 1945 and arrived at Norfolk Naval Base later that day. There, the aircraft repair ship loaded supplies and provisions into the second week of April, when she got underway for shakedown and training in Chesapeake Bay. After subsequent minor repairs and alterations at the Norfolk Navy Yard from 21 April to 8 May, Webster joined Convoy No. 507 on 12 May, transited the Panama Canal eight days later, and arrived at the Naval Air Station (NAS), Alameda, CA, on 6 June.

After further repairs and alterations, the ship departed Alameda on 16 June, bound for the Hawaiian Islands. She arrived at Pearl Harbor on the 24th and docked at NAS Ford Island, where she stayed for four days before she shifted to the navy yard for armament alterations. Shifting subsequently to a berth alongside USS Ozark (LSV-2) on the 28th, Webster remained in Hawaiian waters through most of July.

The ship got underway for the Marshall Islands on the 31st; arrived at Eniwetok Atoll on 10 August; and remained there through mid-September. During her stay at Eniwetok, the surrender of Japan brought World War II to a close. Meanwhile, the ship, herself, serviced the fleet carriers Wasp (CV-18), Antietam (CV-36), and Intrepid (CV-11); the light fleet carrier Cabot (CVL-28), and a half-dozen escort aircraft carrier's, overhauling aviation equipment and returning it to stock for reissue. The material that could not be stored on board—bulky items such as drop tanks and the like—was stored ashore in a depot on Parry Island.

The end of the war had removed the necessity for the replenishment of fast carrier task forces in the fleet anchorage in the Marshall Islands and Gilbert Islands advanced base sites, but there still remained the occupation of Japan. Webster accordingly departed Eniwetok on 13 September, bound via Guam for Tokyo Bay, where she arrived on the 26th. There, Webster serviced all naval aviation activities in the Tokyo Bay area, including the carriers Yorktown (CV-10), Shangri-La (CV-38), Bon Homme Richard (CV-31), Boxer (CV-21), Munda (CVE-104), and Hoggatt Bay (CVE-75); the aviation units of battleships New Jersey (BB-62), Tennessee (BB-43), California (BB-44); those of the heavy cruisers St. Paul (CA-73) and Quincy (CA-71); and finally the planes of 10 light cruisers. In addition, the aircraft repair ship serviced the planes from Marine Air Group 21 and assisted the board headed by Rear Admiral Frederick W. Pennoyer in its investigations into the development of Japanese aircraft and aircraft engine design in World War II.

Webster remained in Tokyo Bay from 6 October to 3 November. During that time, Rear Admiral Clifton A. F. Sprague visited the ship on 20 October and conferred the Presidential Unit Citation to, among others, Capt. Johnson, the ship's commanding officer, for his service in the escort carrier Guadalcanal (CVE-60) in the Atlantic campaign.

Webster, transporting men homeward-bound for discharge, made Guam on 9 November, and stayed for only one night, getting underway for the Marshall Islands on the 10th. Six days later, she reached Roi Island, Kwajalein Atoll and, on the 18th, got underway for the Hawaiian Islands.

Webster disembarked her passengers upon her arrival at Pearl Harbor on 27 November and stood out of Hawaiian waters on the 30th, bound for Panama. She reached the Pacific entrance of the Panama Canal at 0746 on 20 December, transited the canal later that day. and moored at Coco Solo at 1708.

The aircraft repair ship then pushed on for Norfolk, VA, on 22 December, arrived at Norfolk seven days later, and remained in the Tidewater area through mid-January of the following year. On 25 January 1946, Webster departed Norfolk and arrived at Philadelphia Naval Shipyard the following day, mooring alongside the heavy cruiser Portland (CA-33).

Berthed alongside a succession of ships—Fomalhaut (AK-22), Tranquility (AH-14), Sanctuary (AH-17), Dithmarschen (IX-301), Okanogan (APA-220), and Augusta (CA-31)—Webster awaited her decommissioning. At 1047 on 28 June 1946, her commissioning pennant came down for the last time. Struck from the Navy list on I September 1962, she was simultaneously transferred to the Maritime Administration for lay up. She was subsequently scrapped.
