= Fabius-class aircraft repair ship =

Class of aircraft repair ships of the United States Navy

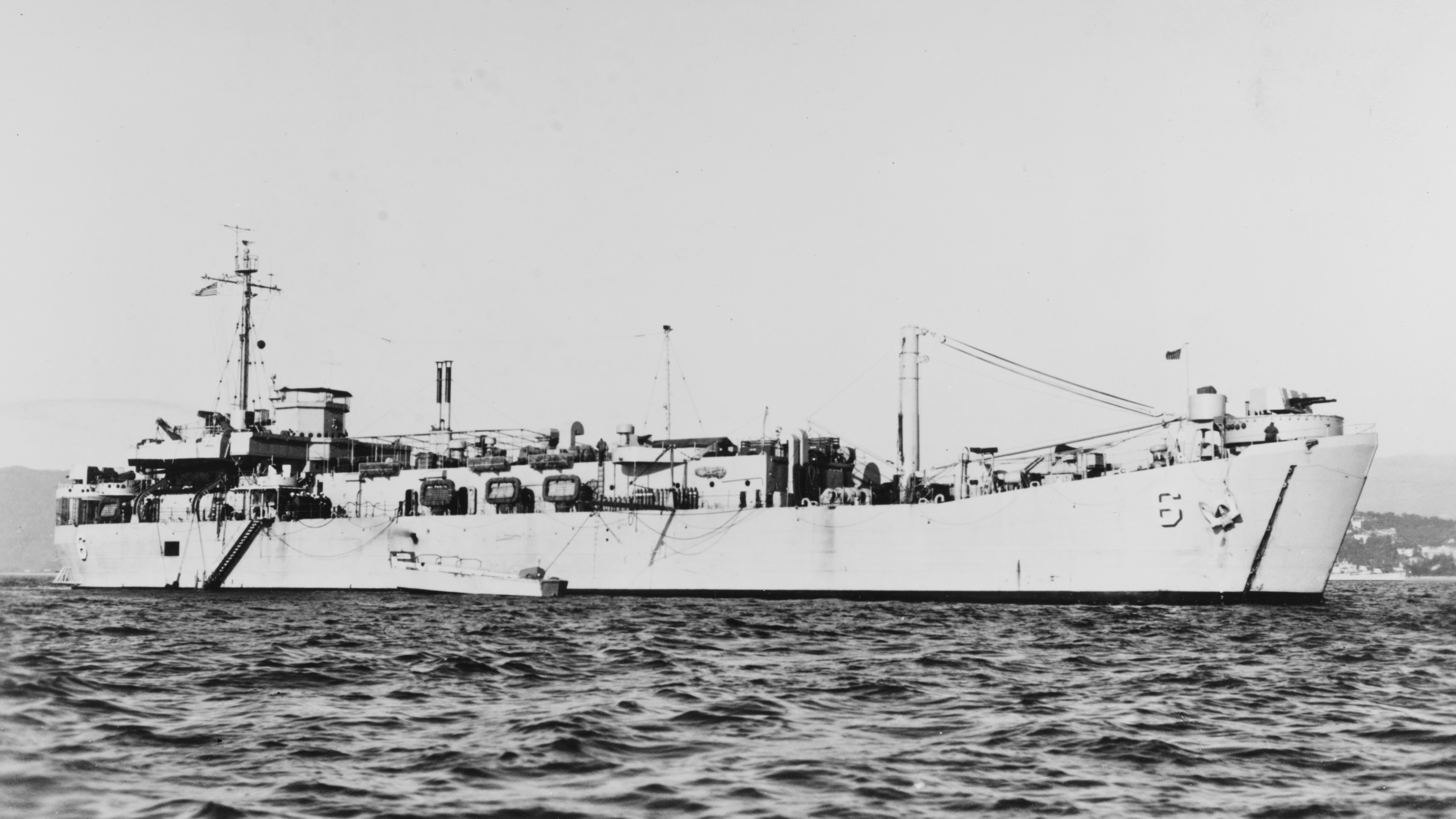
- USS Megara

Class overview
- Name: Fabius class
- Builders: American Bridge Co.
- Operators: United States Navy; Mexican Navy
- Preceded by: Aventinus class
- Built: 1945
- In commission: 1945–1956
- Planned: 2
- Completed: 2
- Retired: 2

General characteristics
- Type: Aircraft repair ship
- Displacement: 2,110 long tons (2,144 t), light; 3,960 long tons (4,024 t), full load
- Length: 328 ft (100 m)
- Beam: 50 ft (15 m)
- Draft: 11 ft 2 in (3.40 m)
- Installed power: 1,800 hp (1,342 kW)
- Propulsion: 2 × General Motors 12-567A diesel engines; Single Falk Main Reduction Gear; 2 × shafts; 2 × rudders
- Speed: 11.6 knots (21.5 km/h; 13.3 mph)
- Boats & landing craft carried: 2 × LCVPs
- Troops: 16 officers, 147 enlisted men
- Complement: 20 officers, 225–240 enlisted men
- Armament: 2 × quad Bofors 40 mm guns; 12 × Oerlikon 20 mm cannons

The Fabius-class aircraft repair ship was a class of repair ships that were operated by the United States Navy during World War II.

== Design ==
Fabius-class was a ship class consisting of two modified LST-542-class tank landing ships, where they serve as aircraft repair ships in late 1945. They have the same hull measurements with changes taken place on their armaments and displacements, alongside a workshop to carry out their role. Only LST-1093 (Fabius) and LST-1095 (Megara) were chosen to be modified and redesignated ARVA, with "A" standing for "Aircraft".

Both ships survived the war and were mothballed for a short while, before Fabius was reactivated amid the Korean War in the 1950s. Mexico bought Megara and renamed her to ARM General Vincente Guerrero (A-05).

== Ships in the class ==
Fabius class
| Hull no. | Name | Callsign | Builder | Laid Down | Launched | Commissioned | Decommissioned | Fate |
|---|---|---|---|---|---|---|---|---|
| ARVA-5 | Fabius | NIRI | American Bridge Co. | 8 January 1945 | 11 April 1945 | 7 June 1945 | 4 April 1952 | Stricken, fate unknown |
| ARVA-6 | Megara | NIRK | American Bridge Co. | 22 January 1945 | 25 April 1945 | 27 June 1945 | 16 January 1956 | Transferred to Mexico and renamed ARM General Vincente Guerrero (A-05), 1973 |

== See also ==
- Repair ship
- List of ships of the Mexican Navy
- American Bridge Company
