= USS Chourre =

1944 Chourre-class aircraft repair ship

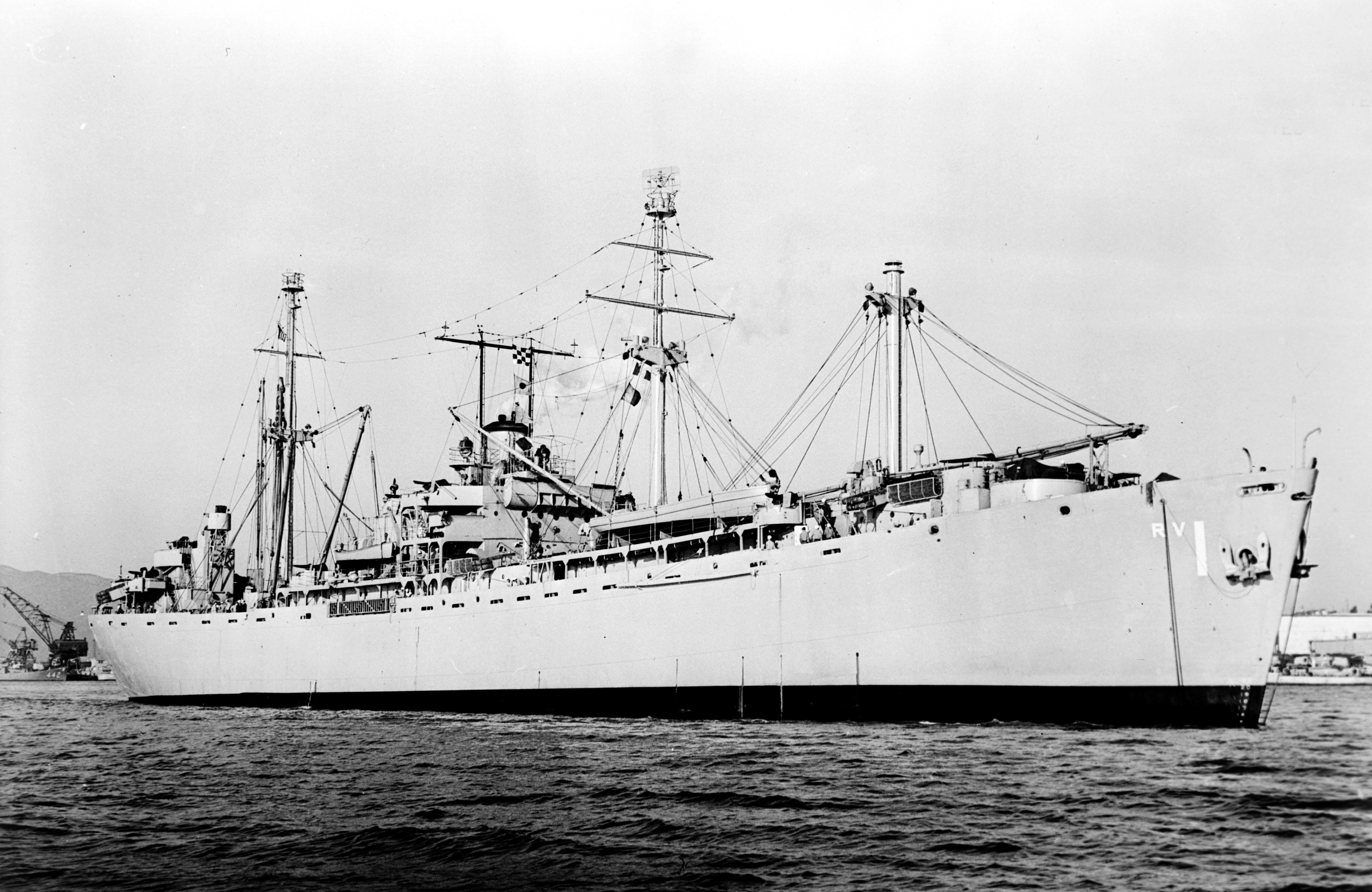
- USS Chourre near the San Francisco Naval Shipyard, 27 March 1952 after a routine overhaul.

History

United States
- Name: Chourre
- Namesake: Emile Chourre
- Builder: Bethlehem Shipbuilding Corporation
- Laid down: 20 April 1944
- Launched: 22 May 1944
- Sponsored by: Mrs E. A. Forde, Jr
- Commissioned: 7 December 1944
- Decommissioned: 13 September 1955
- Stricken: 1961
- Honors and awards: 3 battle stars (Korean War)
- Fate: Sold for scrapping, 5 February 1971

General characteristics
- Class & type: Chourre-class aircraft repair ship
- Displacement: 4,023 long tons (4,088 t)
- Length: 441 ft 6 in (134.57 m)
- Beam: 56 ft 11 in (17.35 m)
- Draft: 22 ft 0 in (6.71 m)
- Propulsion: Triple Expansion Machinery, Single Propeller, 2,500 hp (1,864 kW)
- Speed: 12.5 knots (23.2 km/h; 14.4 mph)
- Complement: 578
- Armament: 1 x single 5 in (130 mm) dual purpose gun mount, 1 x quad 40 mm AA gun mount, 2 x twin 40 mm AA gun mounts

USS Chourre (ARV-1) was a Chourre-class aircraft repair ship that saw service in the United States Navy during World War II and the Korean War.

Originally authorized as USS Dumaran (ARG-14), an internal combustion engine repair ship, she was renamed and reclassified as an aircraft repair ship 22 February 1944; launched 22 May 1944 by Bethlehem Fairfield Shipyard, Inc., Baltimore, MD, under a Maritime Commission contract; sponsored by Mrs. E. A. Forde Jr., and commissioned 7 December 1944.

Sailing from Norfolk 2 March 1945 Chourre arrived at Pearl Harbor 12 April to embark aviation personnel for Espiritu Santo, where she arrived 29 April. She transferred an aviation repair unit to Saipan, then sailed to San Pedro Bay, Leyte, for duty as station supply ship replenishing carriers from 26 May to 17 July. Except for one trip to Guam to replenish stores (17 July-7 August) she remained at San Pedro Bay until 24 October when she sailed for Tokyo Bay to serve ships taking part in the occupation. On 1 January 1946 Chourre sailed from Yokosuka for San Francisco, arriving 4 May. She was placed out of commission 28 November 1948 at Stockton, CA.

Recommissioned 21 February 1952 during the Korean War, Chourre cleared San Francisco 1 September for the Western Pacific. She operated out of Japan supplying ships off Korea until 28 February 1953, returning to San Francisco 26 March. Local operations off San Diego were followed by another tour in the Far East between 17 August 1953 and 11 April 1954. After her third tour to the western Pacific from 30 August 1954 to 1 March 1955, Chourre returned to San Diego where she remained until placed out of commission in reserve again 13 September 1955. She was struck from the Naval Register in 1961 and transferred to the Maritime Commission. After 10 years laid up in the National Defense Reserve Fleet, Chourre was sold to Union Minerals & Alloys for scrapping on 5 February 1971.

The ship was named for Commander Emile Chourre, a distinguished naval aviator who was killed in a naval accident in 1938.

Chourre received 3 battle stars for service in the Korean War.
