= VP-61 =

Patrol Squadron 61
- Active: 1 June 1944 – 17 January 1950
- Country: United States of America
- Branch: United States Navy
- Type: squadron
- Role: Maritime patrol
- Engagements: World War II

Aircraft flown
- Patrol: PB4Y-1P; SBD-3P; F6F-5P; SNB-2P

VP-61 was a Patrol Squadron of the U.S. Navy. The squadron was established as Photographic Squadron 5 (VD-5) on 1 June 1944, redesignated Patrol Squadron (Photographic) 1 (VPP-1) on 15 November 1946, redesignated Patrol Squadron 61 (VP-61) on 1 September 1948 and disestablished on 17 January 1950. It was the third squadron to be designated VP-61, the first VP-61 was redesignated VP-82 on 1 July 1941 and the second VP-61 was redesignated VPB-61 on 1 October 1944.

== Operational history ==
- 1 June – 18 September 1944: VD-5 was established at NAS San Diego, California, under the operational control of FAW-14. The unit was established as a photographic squadron flying the PB4Y-1P Liberator and F6F-5P Hellcat. Squadron personnel were assembled at NAAS Camp Kearney, California, on 3 June 1944 for training on the two aircraft types. On 15 June training on the F6F was deleted from the syllabus. Training was completed on 18 September 1944, and the squadron began preparations for a trans-Pacific flight to Hawaii. Ground personnel departed for Hawaii aboard USS Ticonderoga on 18 September.
- 25 September 1944: VD-5 aircraft departed NAS San Diego for NAS Barbers Point, Hawaii, with the last aircraft arriving on 28 June. The next day the squadron officially reported for duty to FAW-2. VD-5 conducted training for combat operations through mid-November 1944.
- 15–21 November 1944: VD-5 began its transit to NAS Agana, Guam, with the last aircraft arriving on 20 November. Once on board, the squadron came under the operational control of FAW-1, Photo Group 2. The squadron's first mission on 21 November was a series of photographic coverage flights over Chichijima and Hahajima.
- 1 December 1944: The squadron's ground support staff arrived at Guam. Throughout the remainder of the month the squadron participated in photographic reconnaissance missions over the Bonin Islands, and in operations Sledgehammer, Rockcrusher I and II over Iwo Jima.
- 1–31 January 1945: VD-5 continued photoreconnaissance over the Bonins, with two missions each over Truk, Poluwat and Woleai.
- 1–27 February 1945: VD-5 continued flying missions over Iwo Jima and Truk. At this time the squadron acquired an SBD-3P Dauntless to assist in the missions.
- 28 February 1945: VD-5 deployed a forward echelon of five aircraft and crews to Guinan Field, Samar.
- 1–11 March 1945: VD-5 continued to fly photo missions from Guam over Okinawa, Marcus, Chichijima, Hahajima and Yap. 11 Mar – 1 May 1945: The forward echelon at Samar was relocated to Clark Field, Luzon, Philippines. The detachment at that time came under the operational control of FAW-17. By April 1945, VD5 was operating with the headquarters portion of the squadron at Agana, Guam; a forward detachment at Clark Field, Philippines; and two small detachments at Ulithi and Pelelieu. The squadron was providing photographic reconnaissance over Okinawa, Marcus, Chichijima, Hahajima, Yap and Palau islands. VD-5's complement of aircraft was expanded on 20 April 1945 to include eight Grumman F6F-5P Hellcats. On 1 May 1945, all of the VD-5 elements rejoined the squadron at NAS Agana, Guam.
- 13 May 1945: VD-5 received orders to prepare for return to the U.S. Photographic personnel were transferred to Interpretation Squadron 2 (InterpRon-2) and all maintenance personnel were transferred to Photo Group 2. This group departed the combat zone in early June on board SS Poelau Laut and SS Winfield S. Stratton.
- 26 May 1945: The squadron departed the combat zone in two elements of four and three aircraft. The last element arrived at NAS Kaneohe Bay on 30 May, and all squadron aircraft were turned over to FAW-2 HEDRON.
- 2–18 June 1945: VD-5 departed Naval Base Pearl Harbor aboard USS Kalinin Bay, arriving at San Diego on 8 June. Personnel were given orders and home leave. The ground staff of VD-5 arrived from Guam on 18 June 1945. Personnel were given orders and home leave.
- 20 July 1945: VD-5 was reformed at NAAS Camp Kearney under the operational control of FAW14. The squadron was scheduled to become operational for a second combat zone deployment in October 1945, but the Surrender of Japan in September changed those plans.
- October 1945 – November 1946: The squadron was based at various Japanese airfields while deployed to Japan to conduct aerial surveys of the Japanese home islands for Chief of Naval Operations and the Navy Hydrographic Office.
- 15 November 1946: Shortly after returning from Japan to NAS Miramar, California, VD-5 was redesignated VPP-1. Its mission was long-range photographic reconnaissance utilizing six PB4Y-1P Liberators and four SNB-2P aircraft.
- June – September 1947: The squadron deployed a detachment to conduct an aerial survey of Kodiak Island, Alaska. The detachment surveyed Kodiak from 20,000-foot (6,100 m) by flying 35 flight lines paralleling each other on a north-south axis.
- October – December 1947: The squadron conducted aerial surveys of Trinity and Tonto National Forests.
- April – September 1948: The squadron deployed to Alaska to conduct an aerial survey of the Naval Petroleum Reserves in northern Alaska. During this deployment the squadron also surveyed the Tongass National Forest, St. Matthew Island and St. Lawrence Island in the Bering Sea and an area in the vicinity of Fairbanks and the Richardson Highway. During this deployment the squadron exposed 800 rolls of aerial film each 200-foot (61 m) long, for a total of 350,000 aerial photographs.
- May–September 1949: The squadron deployed to Alaska to continue its aerial survey of the Naval Petroleum Reserves as well as additional aerial surveys in other areas of Alaska. During this deployment the squadron processed almost 400,000 aerial photographs for dissemination to various federal mapping agencies.
- 17 January 1950: VP-61 was disestablished at NAS Miramar, all of its assets and personnel, and those of VP-62, were incorporated into Composite Squadron 61 (VC-61). For almost one year, VC-61 was the only long-range photographic squadron left in the Navy.

== Aircraft assignments ==
The squadron was assigned the following aircraft, effective on the dates shown:

- PB4Y-1P – June 1944
- SBD-3P – February 1945
- F6F-5P – April 1945
- SNB-2P – November 1946

== Home port assignments ==
The squadron was assigned to these home ports, effective on the dates shown:

- NAS San Diego, California – 1 June 1944
- NAAS Camp Kearney, California – 3 June 1944
- NAS Barbers Point, Hawaii – June 1944
- NAAS Camp Kearney/NAS Miramar, California – 20 July 1945

== See also ==
- Maritime patrol aircraft
- List of inactive United States Navy aircraft squadrons
- List of United States Navy aircraft squadrons
- List of squadrons in the Dictionary of American Naval Aviation Squadrons
- History of the United States Navy
