= Naval Base Iwo Jima =

US Navy Base on Japanese Volcano Iwo Jima

- Photo of Iwo Jima (Iō-tō), c. 2016. Mount Suribachi is in the lower left hand corner.

- Location within Japan

Geography
- Location: Pacific Ocean
- Coordinates: 24°46′48″N 141°19′12″E
- Archipelago: Volcano Islands
- Area: 21 km^{2} (8.1 sq mi)
- Highest elevation: 169 m (554 ft)
- Highest point: Mount Suribachi

Administration
- In country of Japan
- Administration: United States Navy; 1945–1968

Seventh Fleet Command Headquarters on Iwo Jima August 1945, built by Navy Seabee

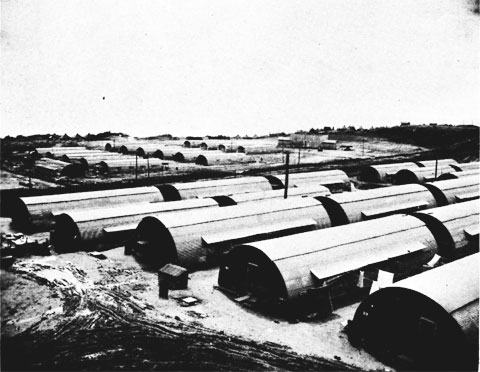
Navy Carrier Aircraft Service Unit (CASU 52) camp and Administration Area, constructed by the 90th Seabees in 1945

Naval Base Iwo Jima was a naval base built by United States Navy on the Japanese Volcano Island of Iwo Jima during and after the Battle of Iwo Jima, that started on February 19, 1945. The naval base was built to support the landings on Iwo Jima; the troops fighting on Iwo Jima; and the repair and expansion of the airfields on Iwo Jima. United States Navy Seabee built all the facilities on the island.

== History ==
With the landings on Iwo Jima, Seabees' first task was to get cargo and vehicles on the island. Amphibious vehicles, Amphibious crafts, barges and amphibious ships were used to get cargo onto the beaches. Beach unloading was difficult due to the surf and sand. Marston Mats were laid to help jeeps and DUKWs onto the beach. Once the beach was secured Seabees built ship dock at the western beach. On the west beach, old ships were sunk to make a breakwater. Both old ships and concrete barges were sunk to make an artificial breakwater to form a harbor. Some of ships sunk were seized from Empire of Japan like the Toyotu Maru. Some were old Soviet Union ships like: Chetvertyi Krabalov, Caliche, and Gilyak. Other ships sunk were US Concrete Barge No. 30 and other concrete Barges. The last ship, the 12th was sunk on June 13, 1945. On the west beach a small harbor was built to support a small boats. The other high priorities for the Seabees were fresh water and the repair and expansion of the airfields on Iwo Jima. Japanese had made 14 wells on the island, the Seabees used eight wells to build a fresh water system including water tanks. Cisterns and new wells were added to the system. The United States Seventh Fleet Command Headquarters move to Iwo Jima in newly built buildings. After clearing land mines, the Seabees built a Radar station on Mount Suribachi and built a road to the top.

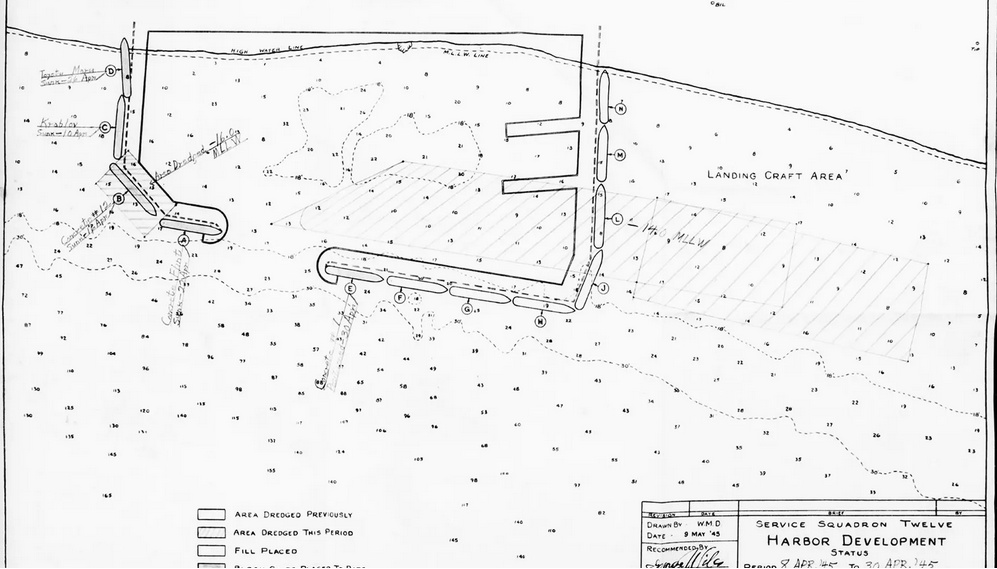
Naval Base Iwo Jima, artificial breakwater to form a harbor on west beach from April 1945

== Facilities ==
Facilities built by the Seabees:

- West beach harbor, built with sunk ships 24.7770°N 141.2918°E
- East boat basin 24.768499°N 141.768499°E
- Piers and quay walls
- DUKW west beach landings with mats
- Landing beaches with mats
- Water supply system, with tanks and water distillation
- Ammunition depot
- Quartermaster depot
- Medical center
- Engineering camp
- Chemical Engineering Camp
- Power stations
- Crash boat base
- 27,000 cubic feet refrigerated depot
- Tent camp for 37,000 Troops
- Headquarters -quonset huts
- Navy Carrier Aircraft Service Unit (CASU) camp and depot
- Mess halls - quonsets
- Hospitals: 1,250 beds
  - 38th Field Hospital
  - 41st Station Hospital
  - 232nd General Hospital
- Navy dispensaries with 105 beds
- Radar station on Mount Suribachi, built road to top.
- 20 miles of primary roads
- 40 miles of secondary roads
- Tank farms for: Fuel oil, aviation fuel, diesel fuel, gasoline
- AA gun emplacements
- Navy Communication Center
- Post office FPO# 3150 SF Iwo Jima, Kazin Group
- East shore quarry
- Seabee depot
- Hangars

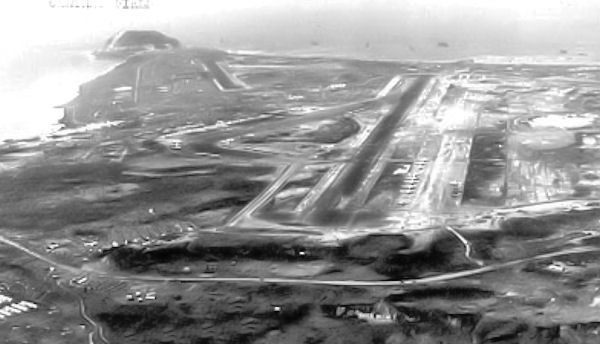
South and Central Fields Iwo Jima 1945

== Airfields ==
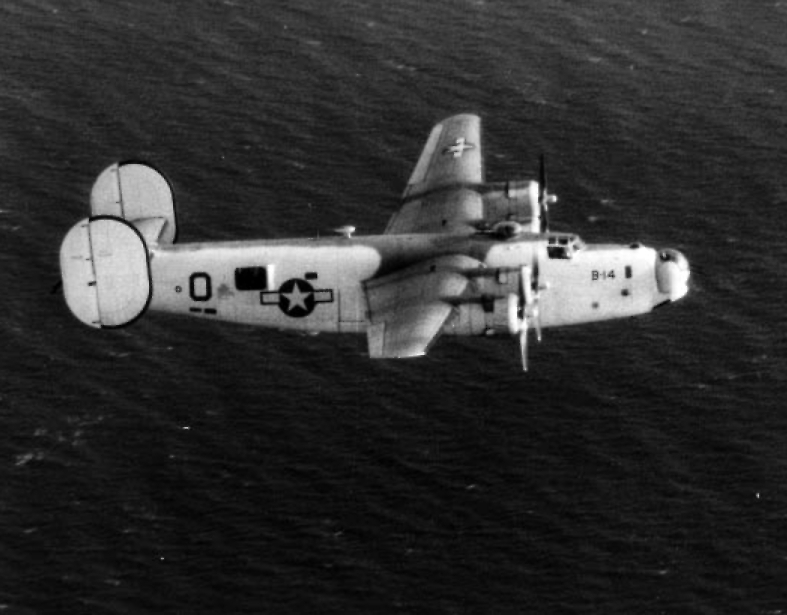
US Navy PB4Y-1 Liberator on patrol, PB4Y-1 operated out of South Field

The Seabees first repaired the captured airfields. Next for Boeing B-29 Superfortress operation, the Seabees did massive earth works to get some to the needed 9,800 feet (3,000 m) runway. A number of Superfortresses made emergency landings as soon as the runway was fixed.

- Central Field (also called Motoyama No. 2) was built by Japan, with two runways: 5,225 feet (1,593 m) and 4,425 feet (1,349 m). Seabees completed the extension of the runway to 8,500 feet (2,600 m) by July 7, 1945, and by July 12, to a length of 9,800 by 200 feet (2,987 by 61 m).United States Armed Forces continued to use Central Field. On June 27, 1968, the US departed Central Field and gave control over to Japan. Japan used the airfield for as a navigation and weather station. United States Armed Forces use the airport for refueling and some time for US Navy special pilot training.
- South Field (also called Motoyama No. 1 and Chidori Field) is the south corner of Iwo Jima. Japan had built two runways, one 5,025 feet (1,532 m) and the other 3,965 feet (1,209 m). Naval Mobile Construction Battalion 133 did the repair work on the runways. The runway was used by both the United States Army Air Forces and the US Navy. The US Navy's VPB-116 operated PB4Y-1 Liberator as patrol bombers from South Field. Later the PB4Y-1 were replaced by Consolidated PB4Y-2 Privateer aircraft. By July 1945, Seabees had completed the extension of the runway to 6,000 feet (1,800 m) by 200 feet (61 m). On September 30, 1955, South Field was closed and turned over to Japan to be abandoned.
- North Field (also called Motoyama No. 3) was an incomplete runway built by Japan. Seabees started work on completing the runway, then turned the work over USAAF aviation engineer battalion April 27, 1945. Massive Earthworks was done, by August 1945 and the Surrender of Japan the runway was 5,500 feet (1,700 m). North Field was located at 24°47′37″N 141°19′29″E. With the war over North Field was used as a depot and then abandoned.

== Seabees ==
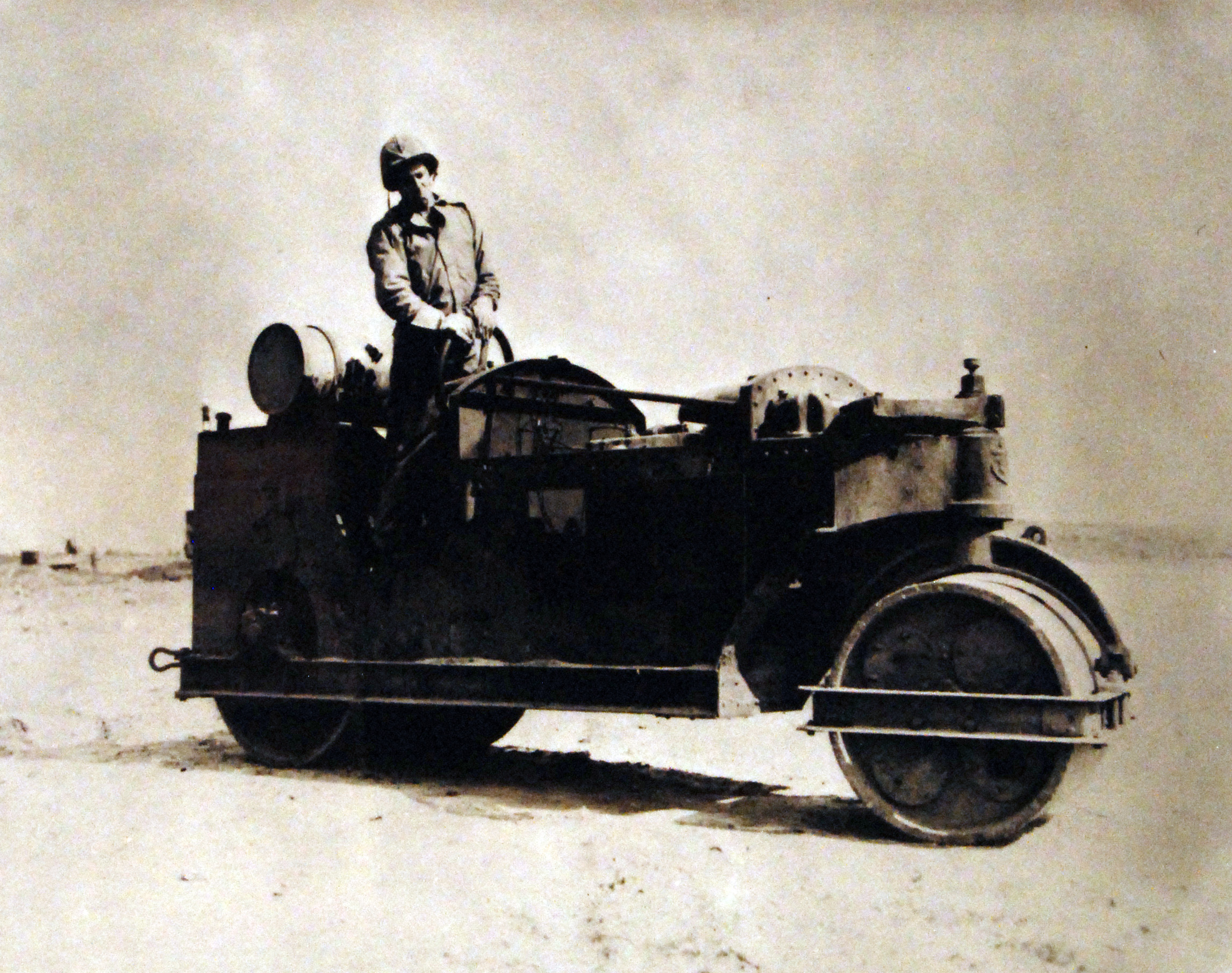
Seabee on a captured Japanese steam roller

Seabees had very high casualties on Iwo Jima. Seabees were given the dangerous task of clearing land mines. Others were hit by enemy fire during unloading or construction.

Units on Iwo Jima:

- 31st Seabee battalion attached to the 5th Marine Division
- 62nd Seabee battalion attached to the 5th Amphibious Corps
- 133rd Seabee battalion to attached the 4th Marine Division.
- Ninth Construction Brigade
- 90th Seabee battalions
- Eighth Regiment: 8th 95th
- 23rd Special Battalions
- Seabee Medical Corps

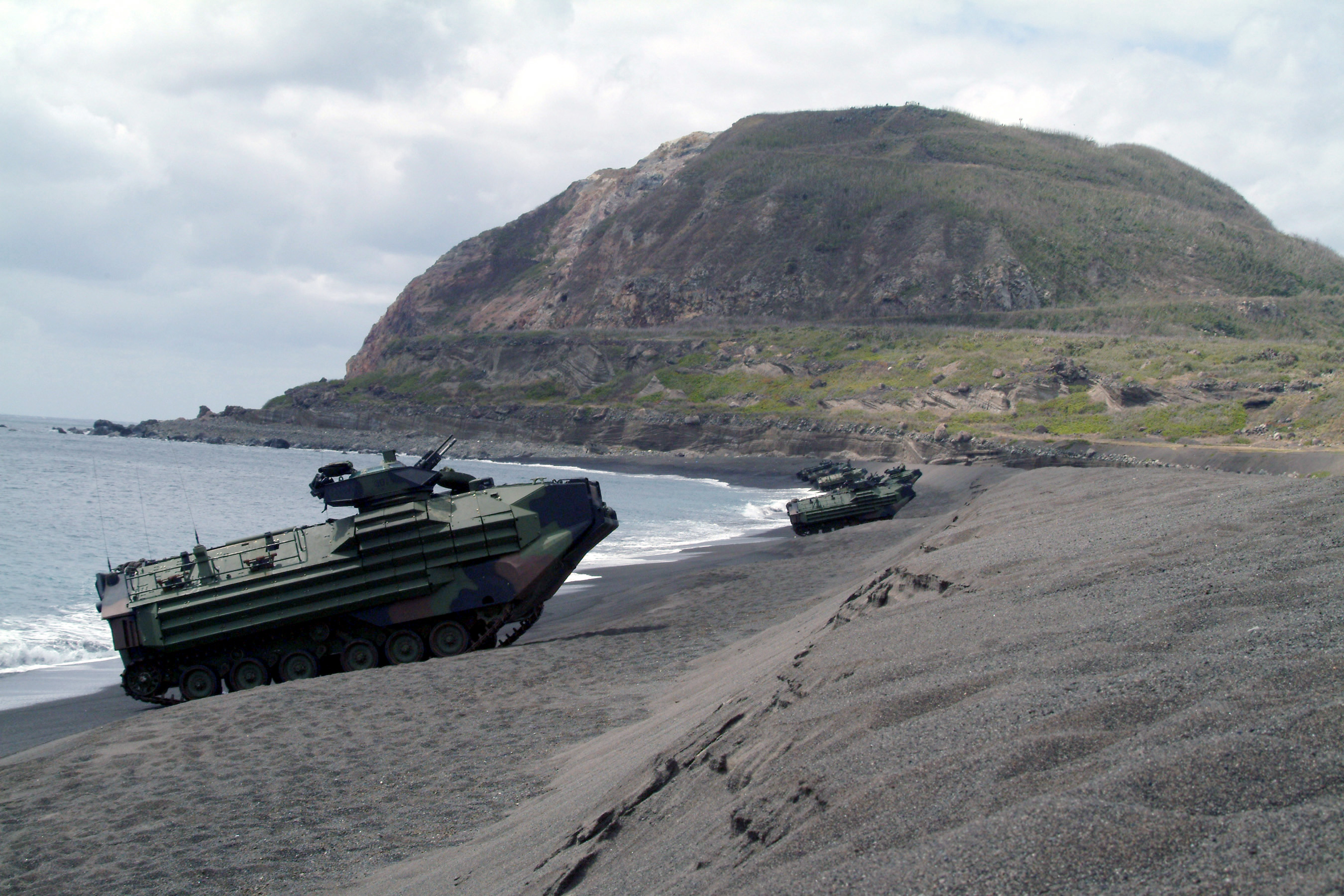
Amphibious Assault Vehicles (AAVs) on beach by Mount Suribachi in a static display for the 58th Anniversary of the Battle of Iwo Jima in 2003

== Geography ==
Iwo Jima is a small volcanic island south of the Japanese homeland. The base took over almost all of the 21 km^{2} (8 sq mi; 5,189 acres) of land. Seabee built a road to the top of the highest peak, 161 m (528 ft), on Iwo Jima, Mount Suribachi on the south point of the island. Most of the remainder of the volcanic island is a flat plateau. Much of the island is covered in volcanic black-gray sand and ash. The soft volcanic ash made the movement of troops and vehicles very difficult. The black beaches have a steep rise to the plateau. Marston Mats were laid on the beaches and into the water to help. The beaches have a sharp dropped off into the ocean, producing a narrow and violent surf zone, difficult for the landing craft. The island had no natural harbors and surf can be heavy at times. The beaches had many disabled crafts and vehicles on the landing D-day. The west beach offered 3 miles of landing beaches and the east shore had 2 miles of landing beaches. Each beach was divided into zones and names of a color. The north beaches were not used as these face a high plateau. Iwo Jima is 1,200 km (750 mi; 650 nmi) south of the city of Tokyo, becoming a key base near Japan. Due to the island's small size and lack of a large harbor, it did not become a large base like Tinian Naval Base, where the B-29 Superfortress Enola Gay took off from.

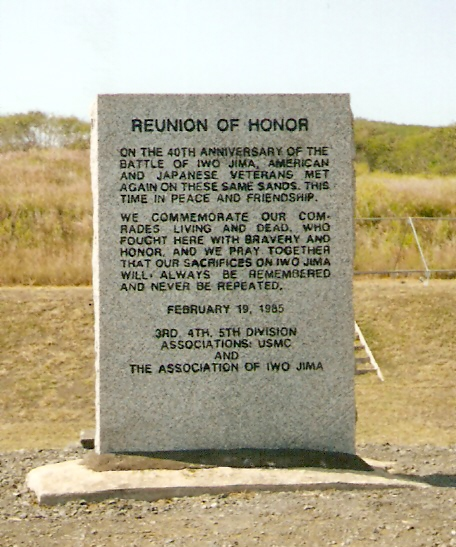
Reunion of Honor memorial on Iwo Jima

== Post-war ==
- While fighting ended on March 26, 1945, there were a few Japanese holdouts. Two soldiers under Lieutenant Toshihiko Ohno, Yamakage Kufuku (Yamakage Koufuku) and Matsudo Linsoki (Matsudo Rikio), hid out on the island for four years. They surrendered on January 6, 1949.
- The US closed its last base on the island on June 27, 1968.
- Seabee Memorial Iwo Jima at 24°48′09″N 141°19′11″E.
- Mt. Suribachi Peak Memorial, dedicated to fallen U.S. and Japanese service members, at 24°45′02″N 141°17′21″E.
- Former American War Cemetery Iwo Jima at 24°45′31″N 141°17′48″E. 6,821 American Troops died in the battle.
- Reunion of Honor Memorial, memorial commemorating the reunion of American and Japanese veterans of the Battle of Iwo Jima at 24°45′44″N 141°18′18″E.
- Islanders' Memorial Peace Cemetery Park at 24°47′28″N 141°18′21″E.
- Iwo Jima, Japanese Artillery Control Bunker.
- The sunk ship artificial breakwater is still at Iwo Jima. Some of the ships have moved due to typhoons and rising beach levels caused by volcanic uplift. Now called Shipwreck Cluster at 24°46′33″N 141°17′30″E.
- Tranquility Hill, Japanese memorial at 24°46′35″N 141°19′07″E.
- Japanese Iwo Jima Memorial at 24°45′01″N 141°17′21″E.
- Marine Corps War Memorial, a national memorial located in Arlington County, Virginia, dedicated in 1954. With iconic 1945 photograph of six Marines raising a U.S. flag.
- Iwo Jima Monument West at Marine Corps Base Camp Pendleton.

== Gallery ==
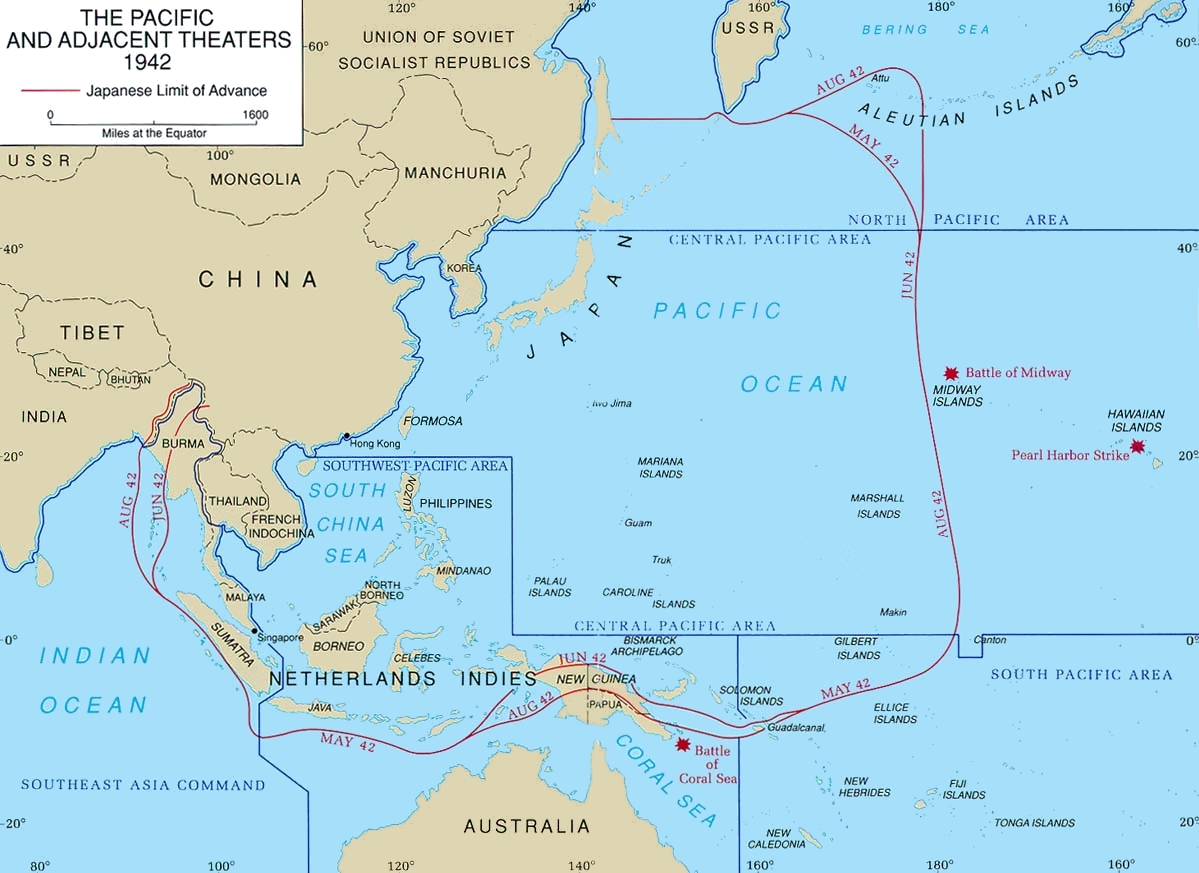
Pacific War Theater Areas map 1942

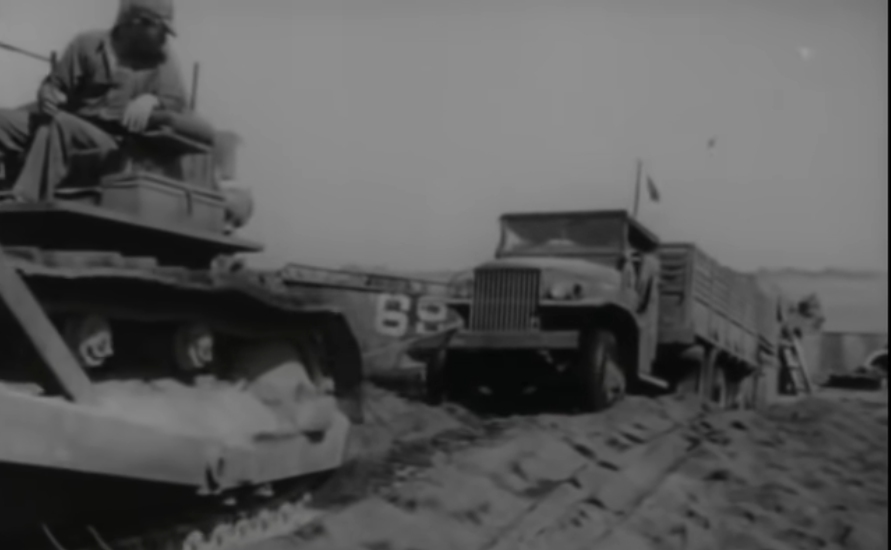
US Navy Seabee bulldozer is used to get a truck loaded with cargo ashore

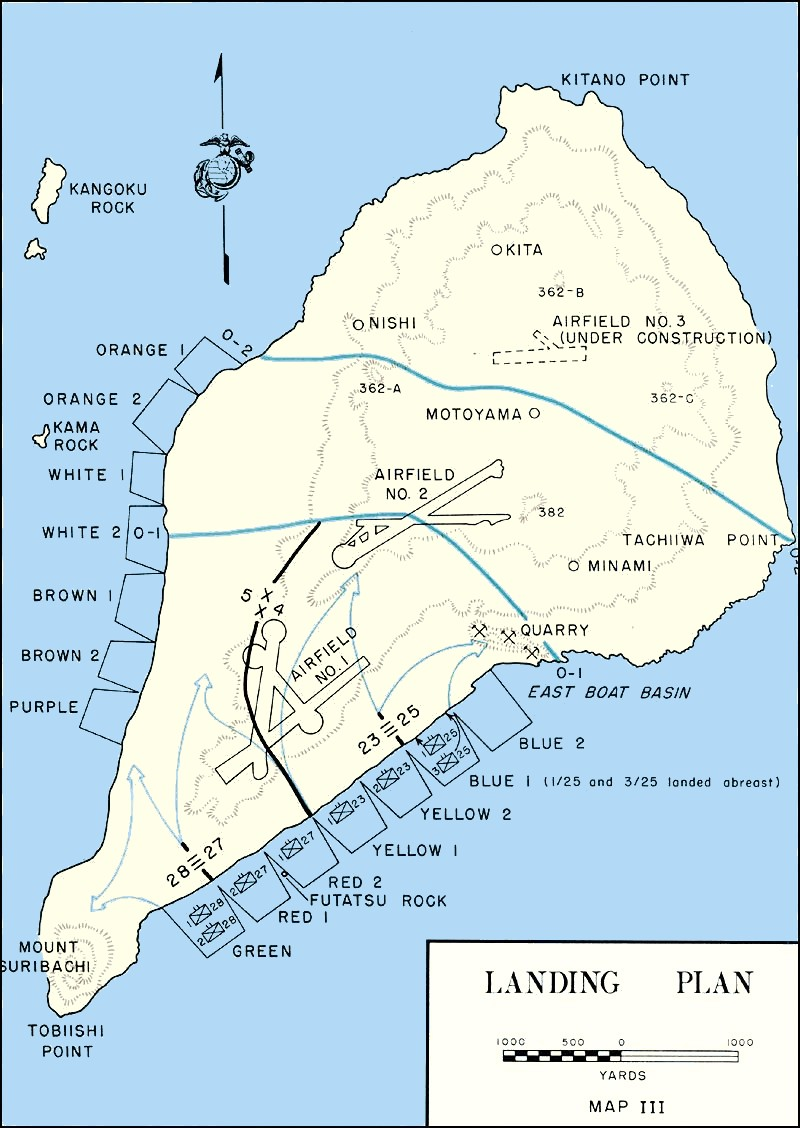
Iwo Jima landing plan map

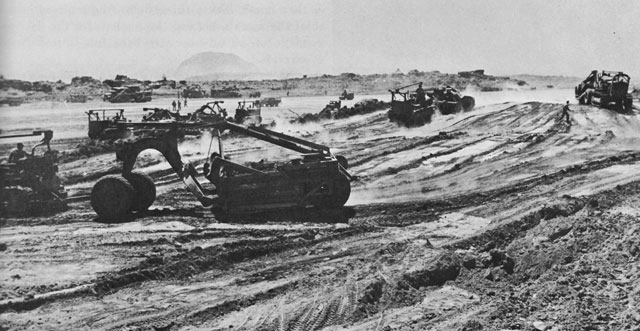
Seabee working on Iwo Jima South Field, Airfield Number 1

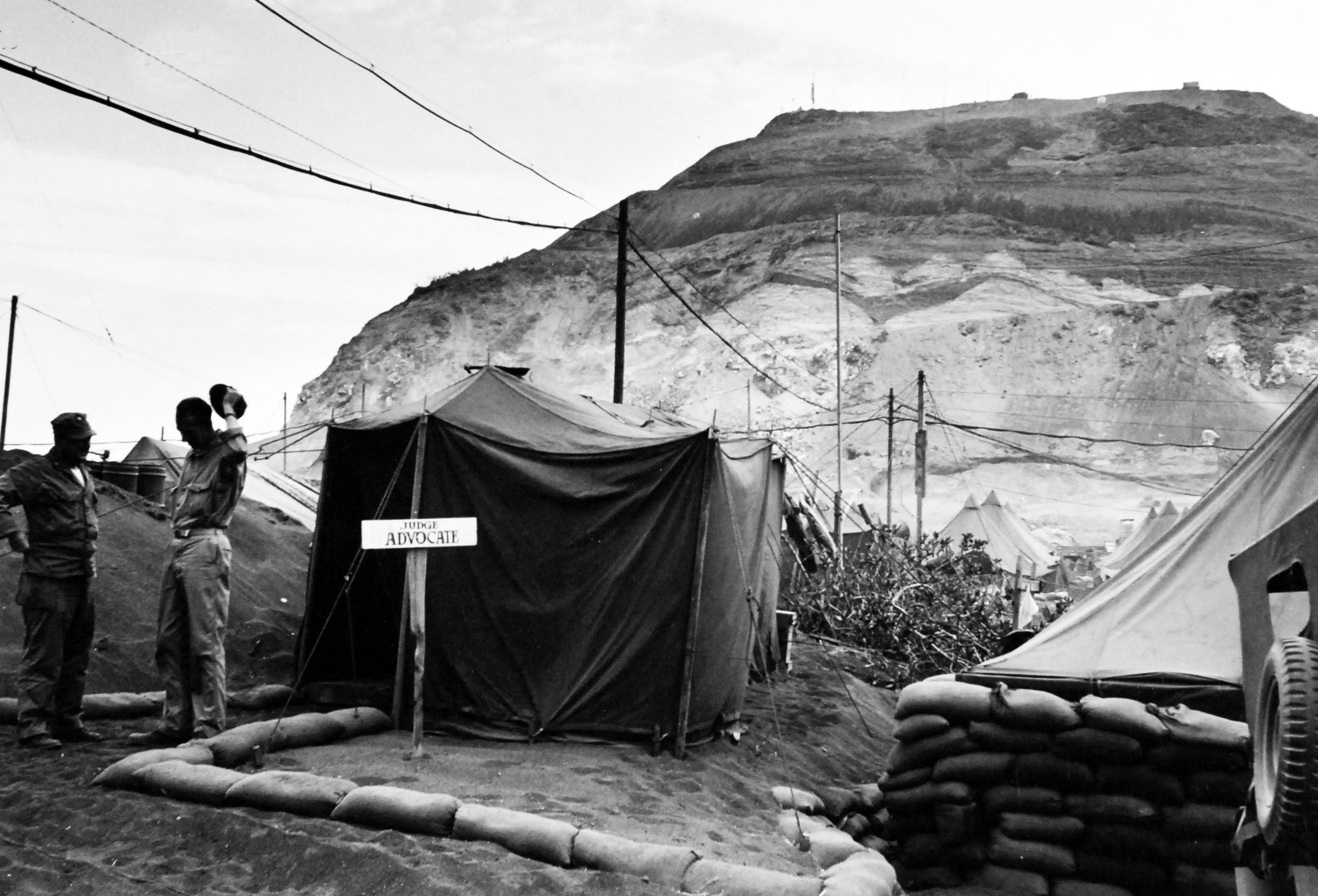
Tent camp

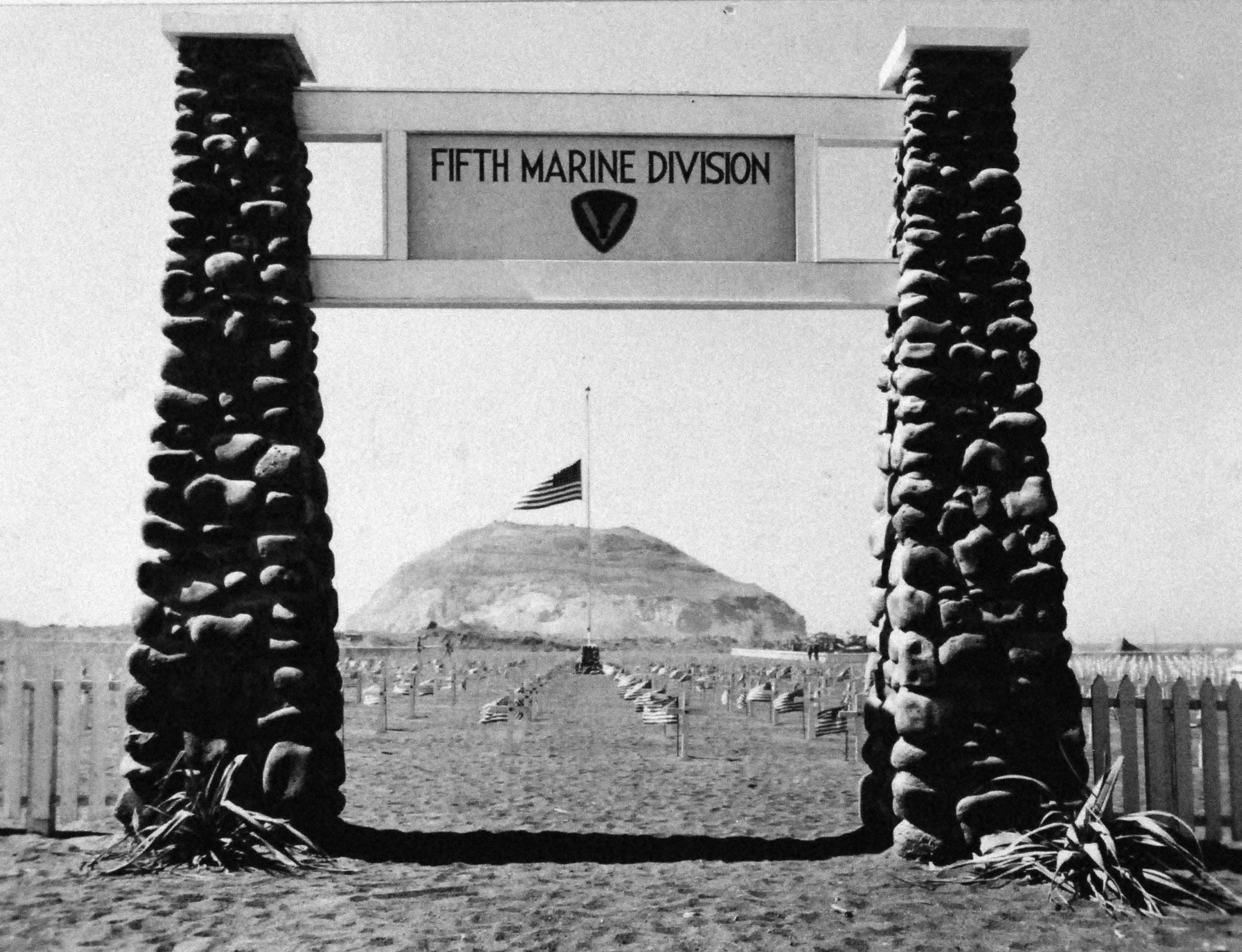
5th USMC Division Cemetery entrance built by the 31st CB with Mt. Suribachi center. (now moved).

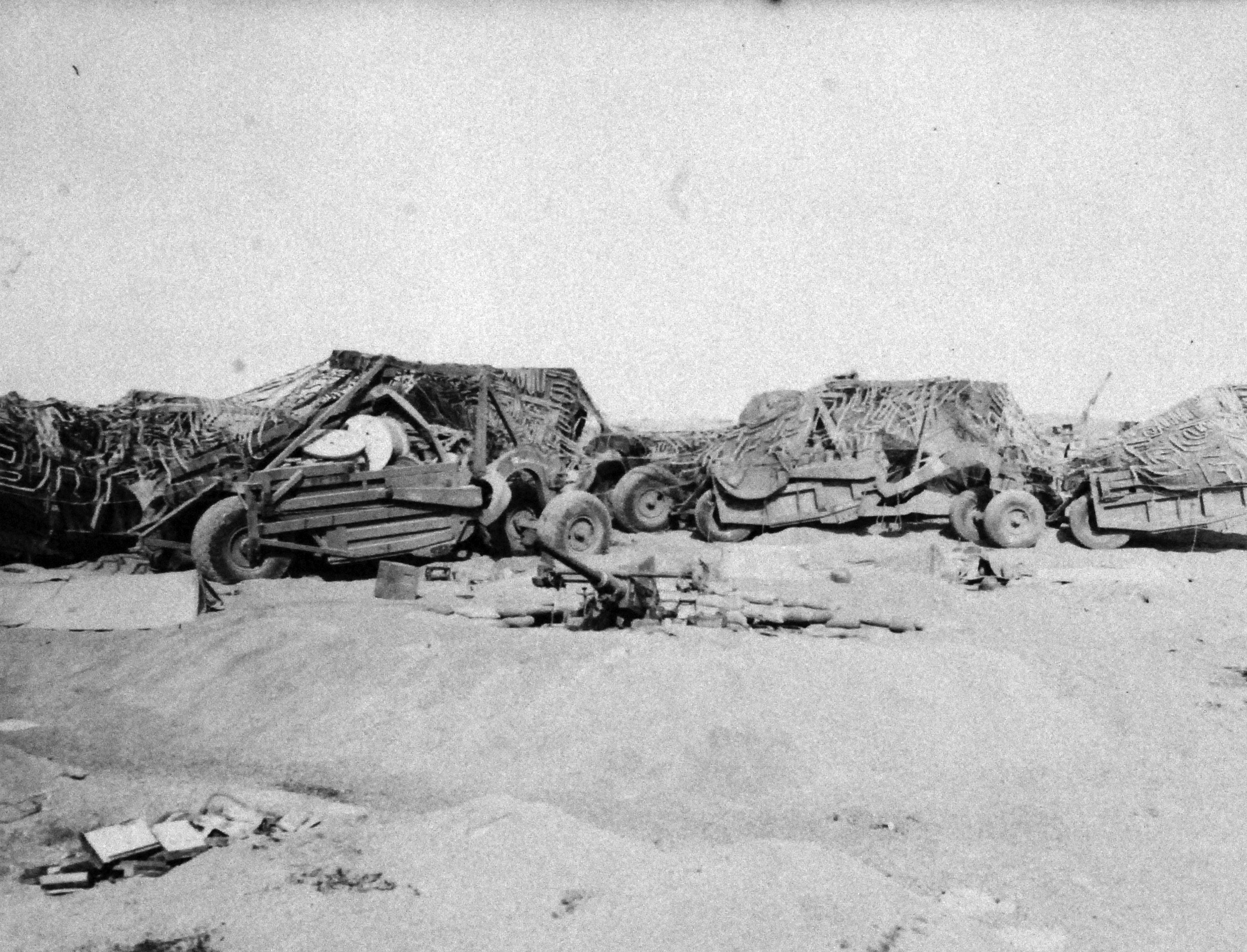
Camouflage of Seabee heavy equipment on Yellow Beach #3

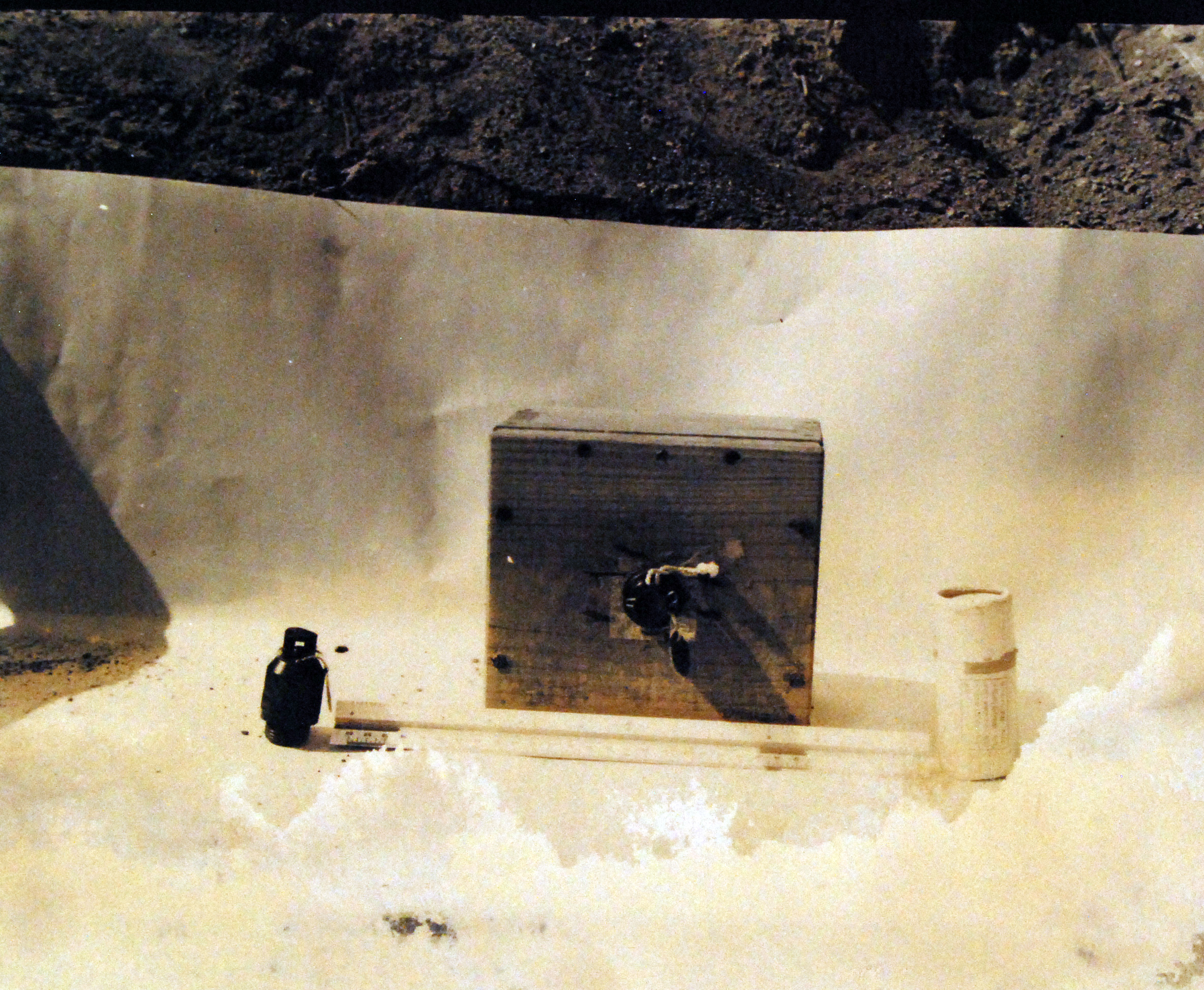
Japanese factory made wooden box mine removed by Seabee

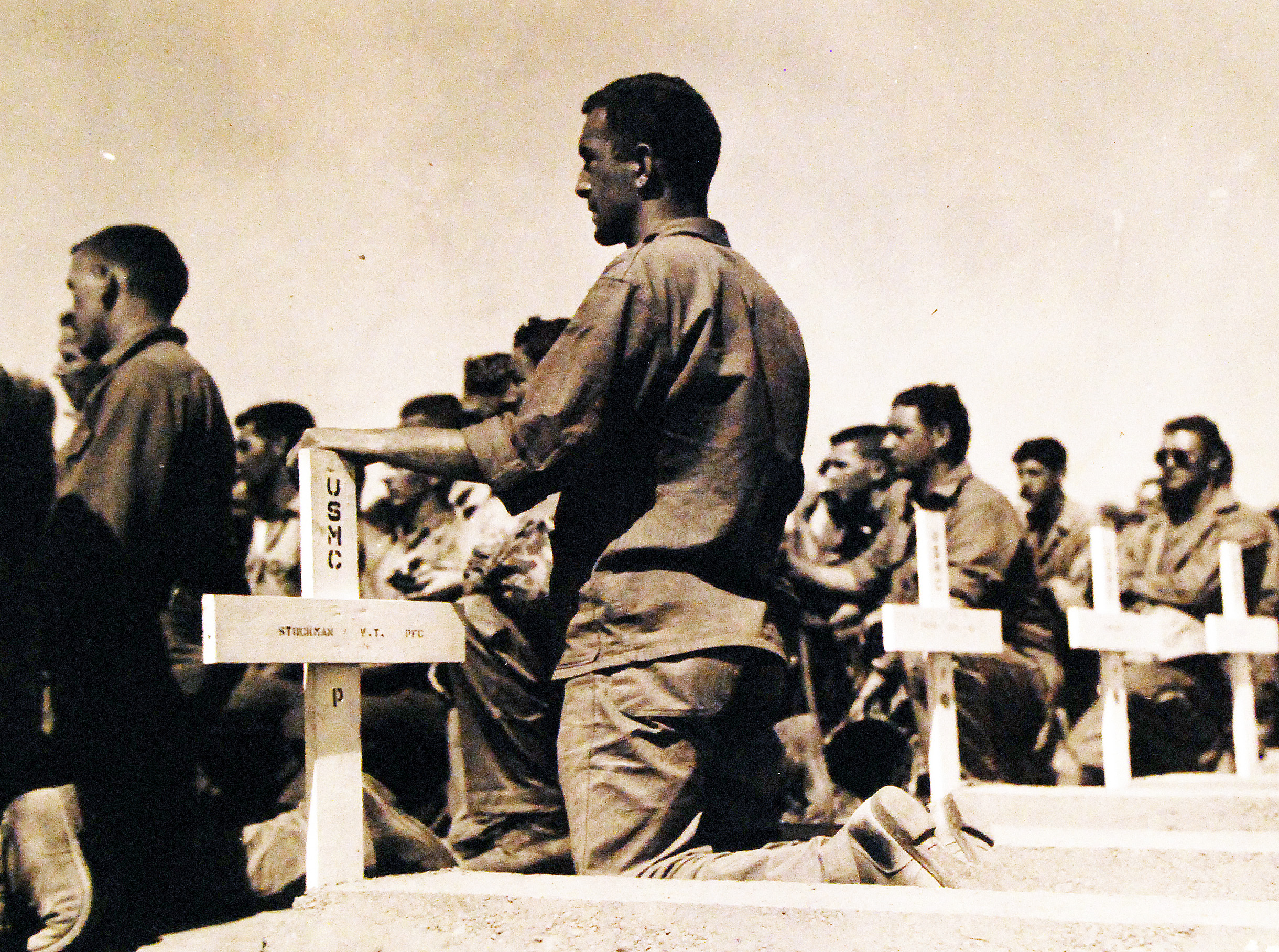
Marines kneel at cemetery crosses during a dedication ceremony on March 15, 1945

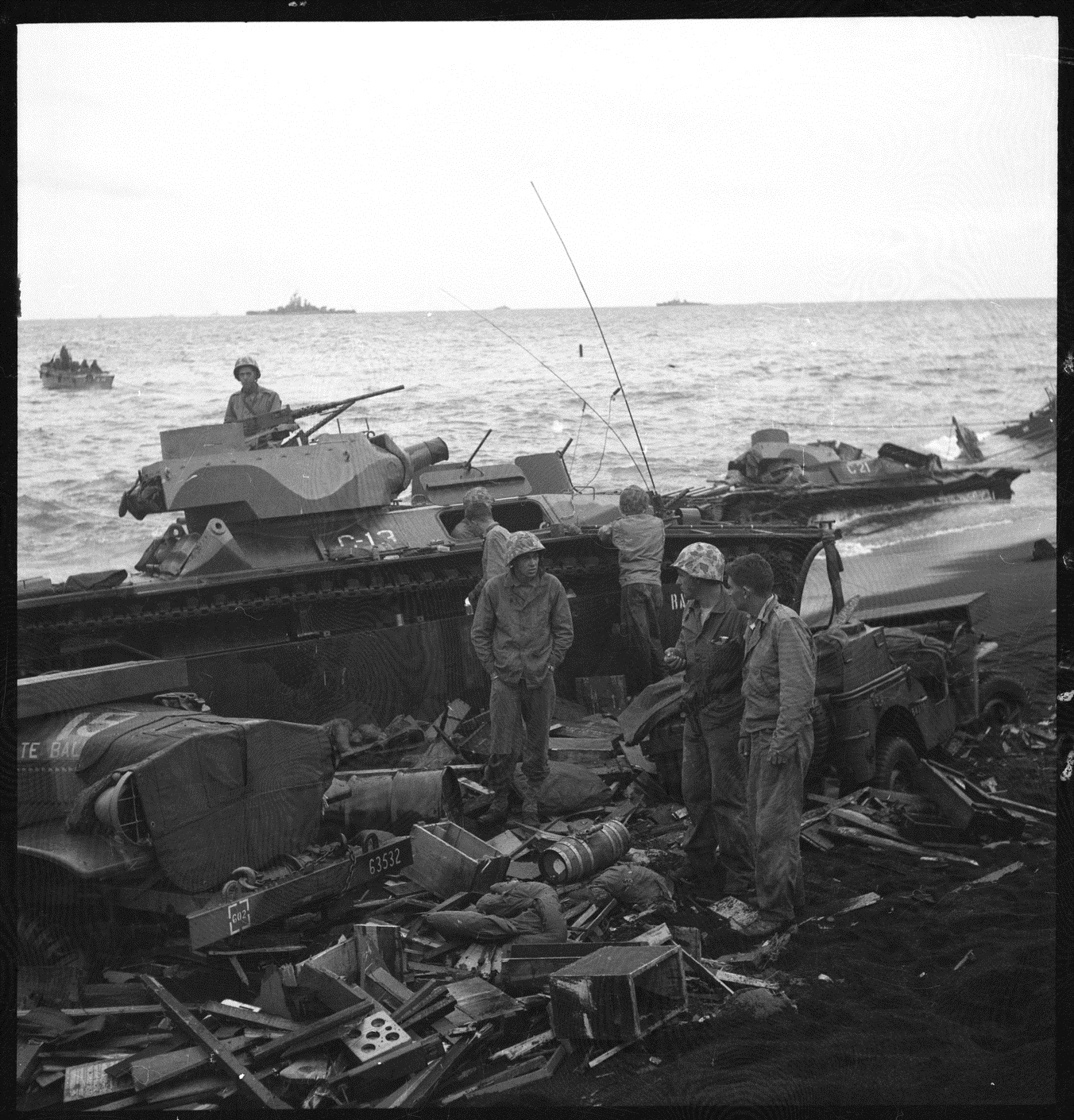
Debris on the beach

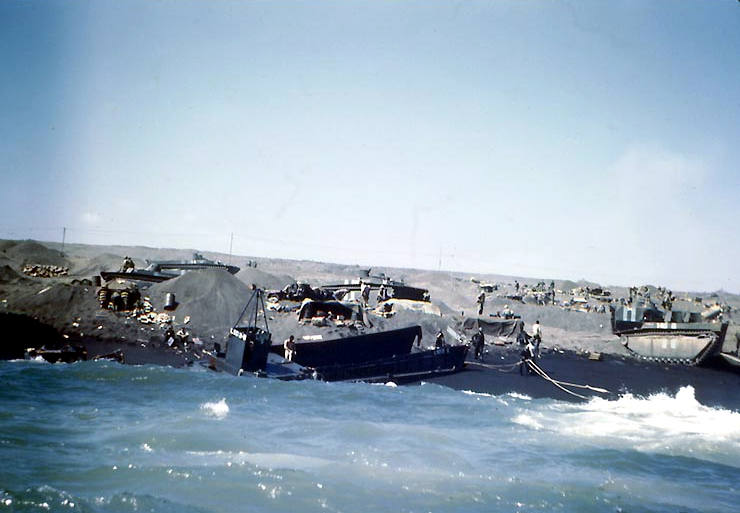
Damaged landing craft on beach, 1945

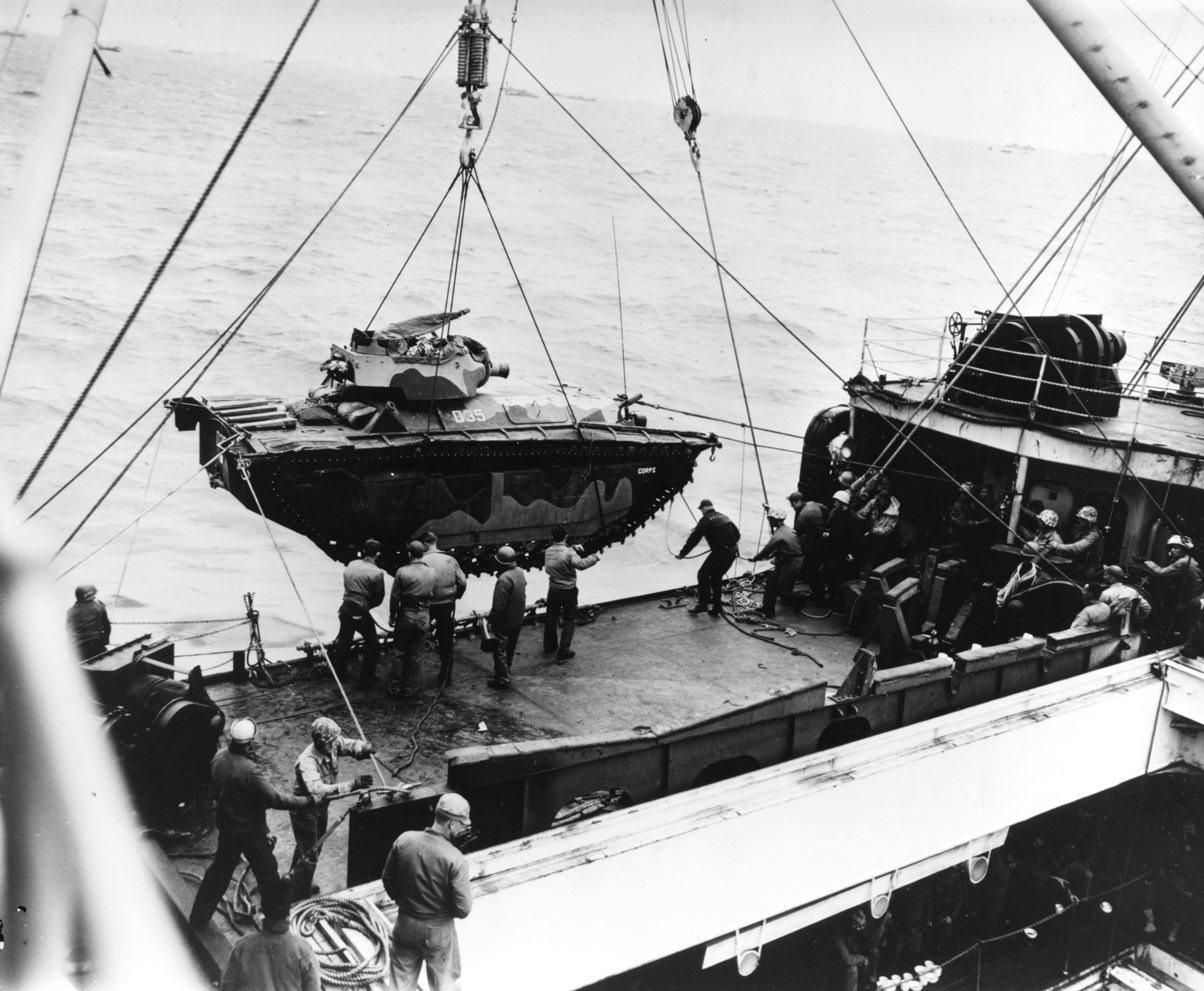
LVT(A)-4 is hoisted from USS Hansford (APA-106)

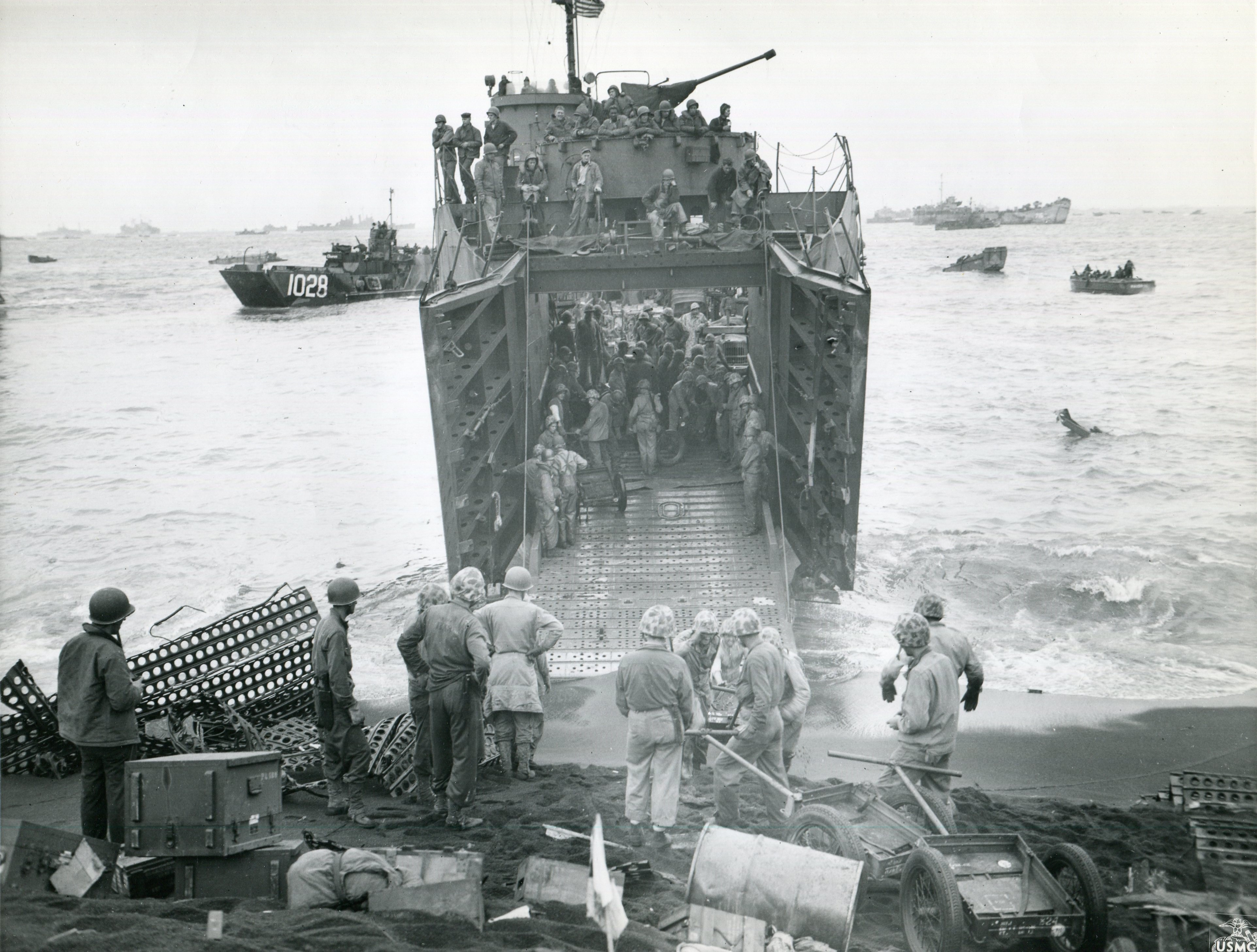
Unloading supplies on Iwo Jima beach

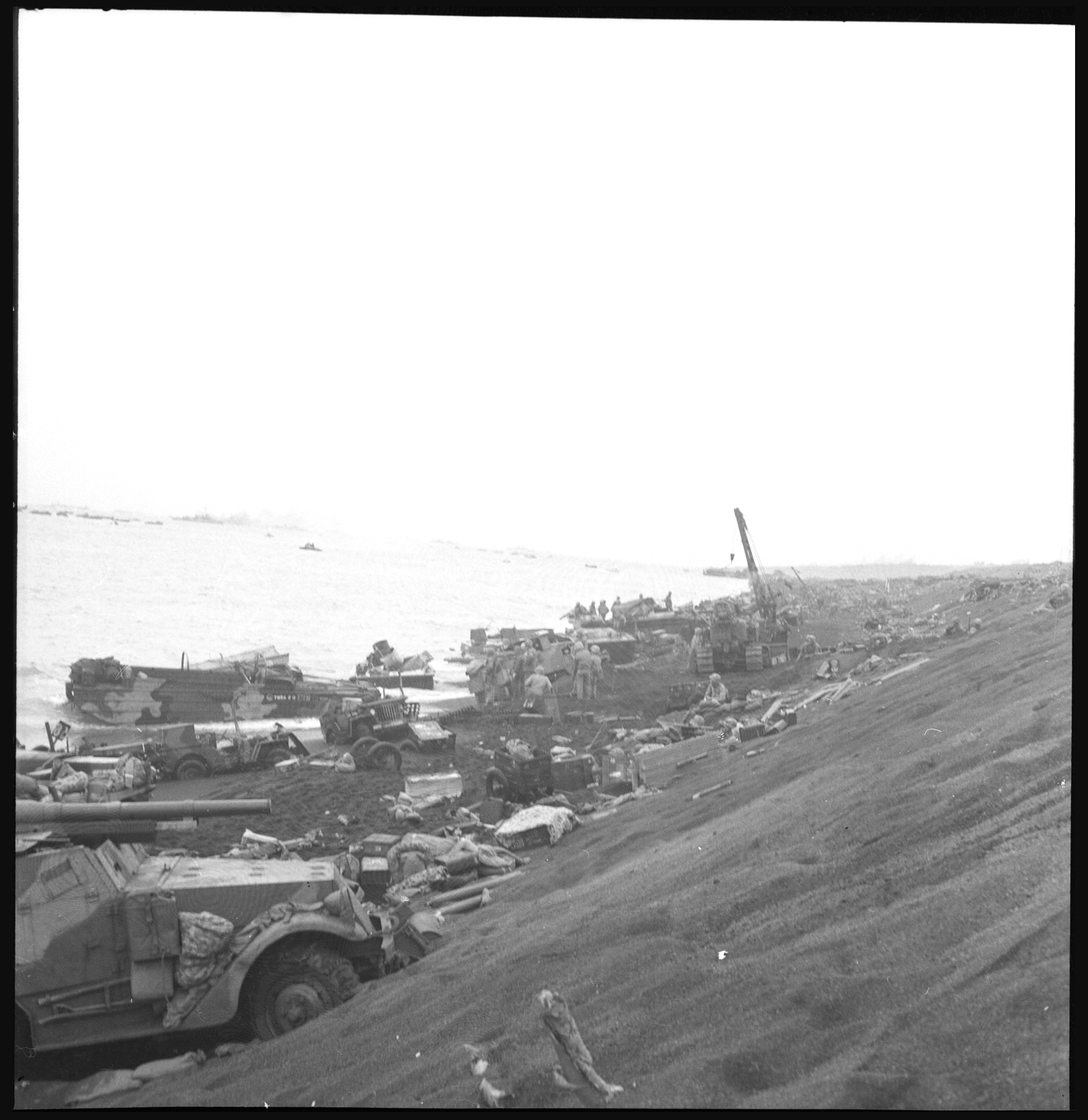
Landing activity on Green Beach, February 1945

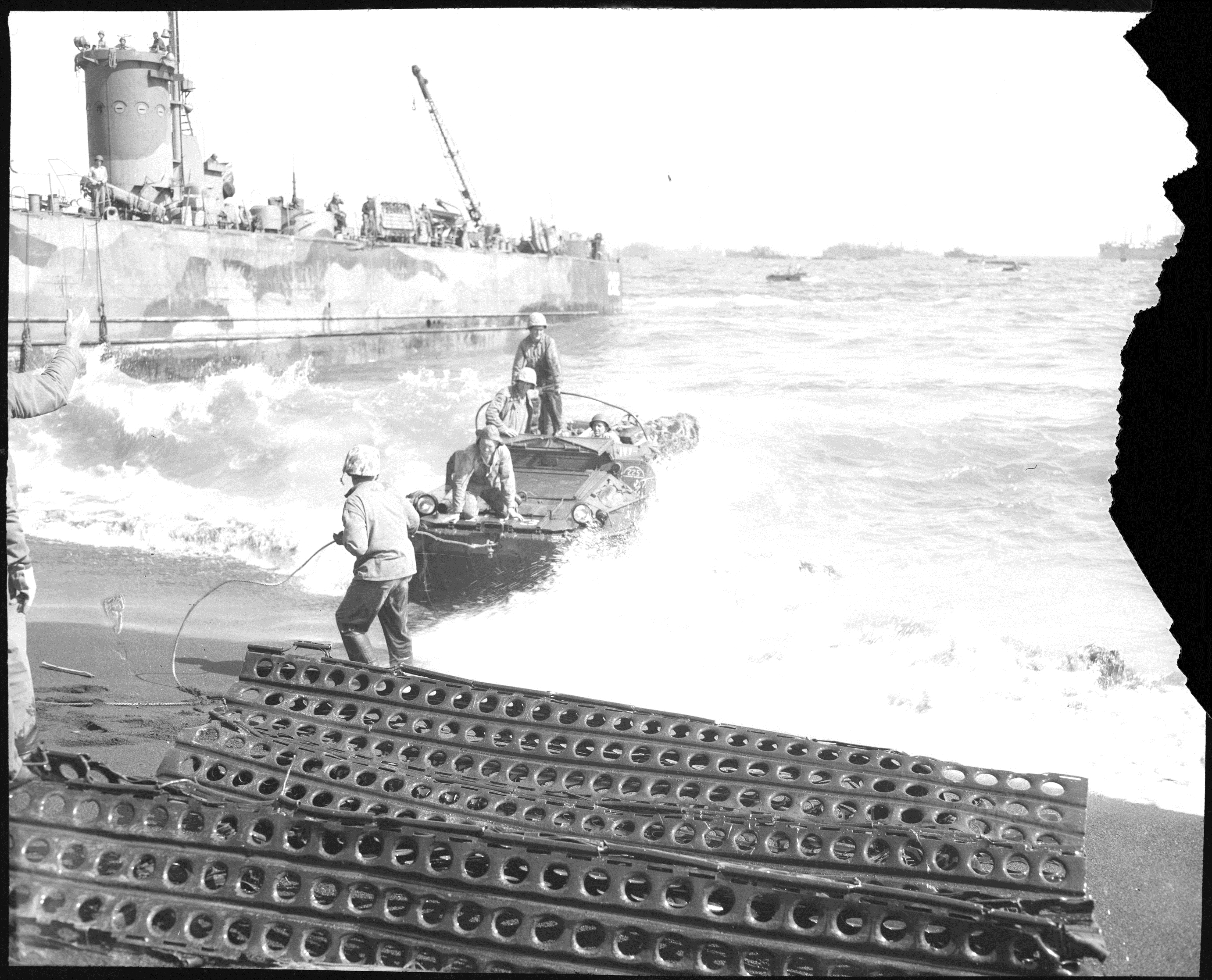
DUKW beach landing with unusable storm-damaged mats

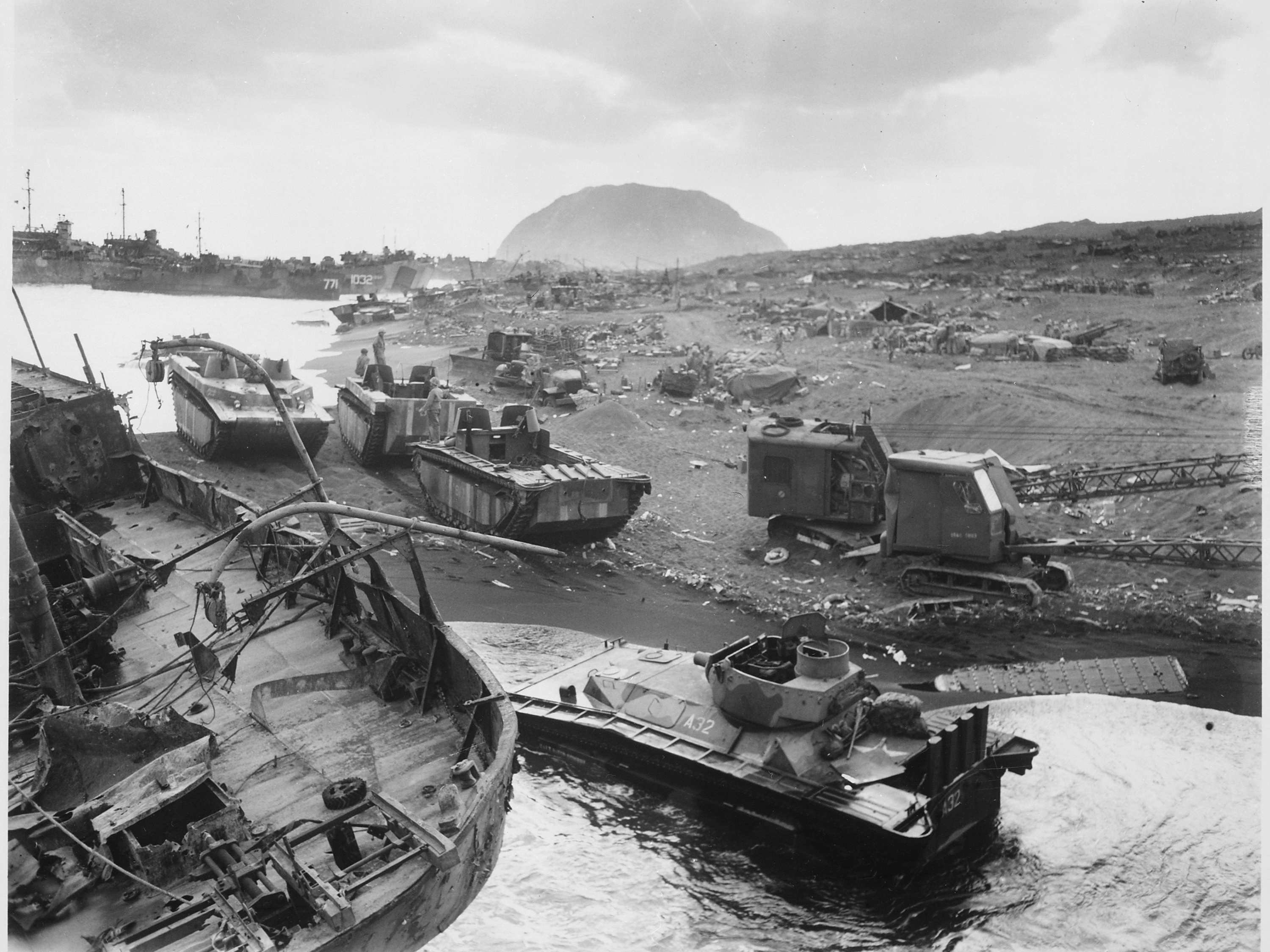
Knocked-out LVTs on Iwo Jima beach

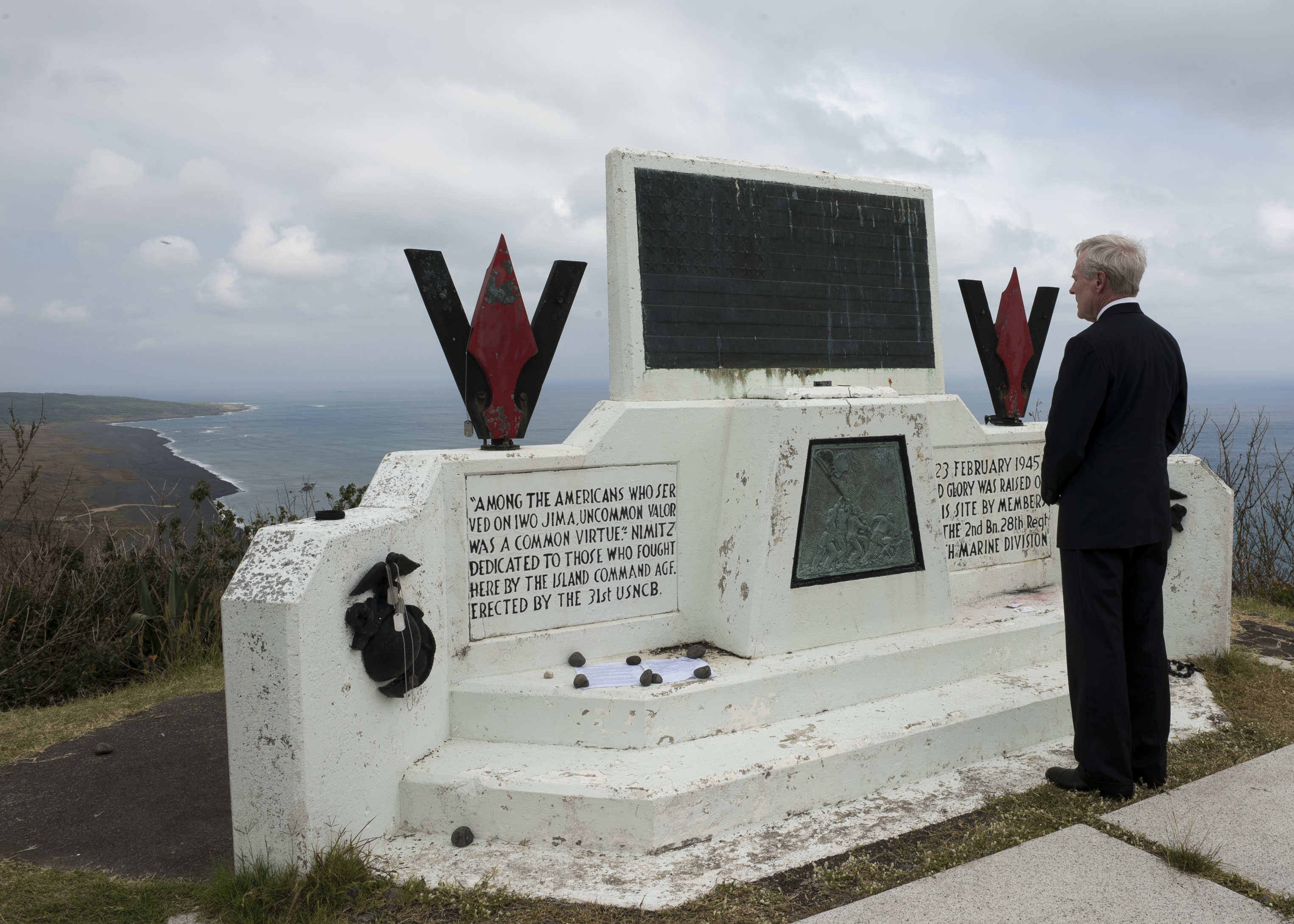
70th anniversary commemoration ceremony for the Battle of Iwo Jima on top of Mount Suribachi

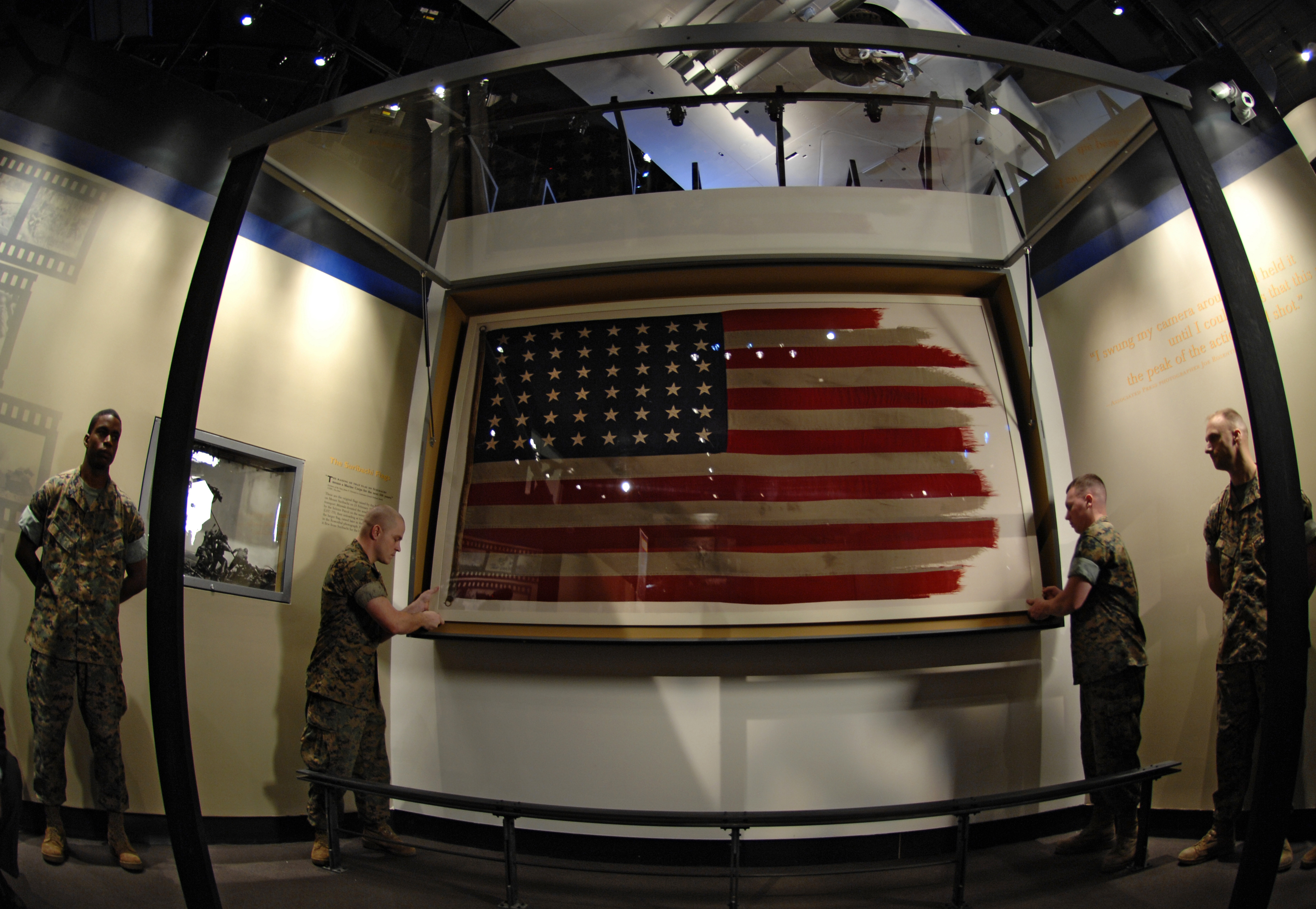
Original American flag raised on Mount Suribachi

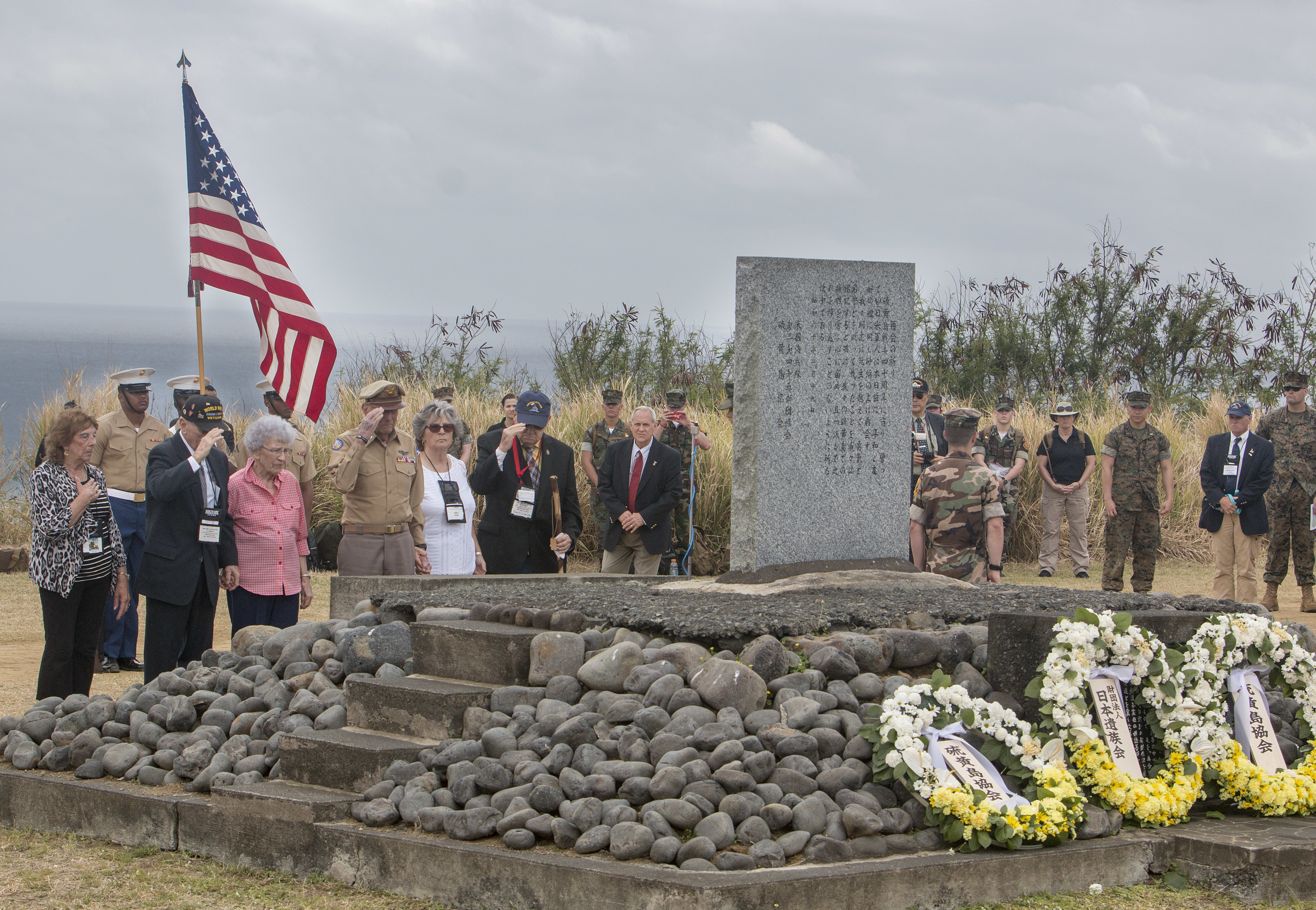
WWII veterans and guests at a wreath-laying ceremony at Mount Suribachi on March 25, 2017

== See also ==
- USAAF in the Central Pacific
- Planning for the Battle of Iwo Jima
- U.S. Naval Base Subic Bay
- Espiritu Santo Naval Base
- US Naval Advance Bases
- Naval Advance Base Saipan
