= Planning for the Battle of Iwo Jima =

Preparations for 1945 battle

In anticipation of the Battle of Iwo Jima, Lieutenant General Tadamichi Kuribayashi prepared a defense that broke with Japanese military doctrine. Rather than defending the beaches, Kuribayashi devised a defense that maximized enemy attrition. The American plan of attack was made in anticipation of a standard defense.

== Japanese planning ==
Even before the fall of Saipan in June 1944, Japanese planners knew that Iwo Jima would have to be reinforced significantly if it were to be held for any length of time, and preparations were made to send sizable numbers of men and quantities of materiel to that island. In late May, Lieutenant General Tadamichi Kuribayashi was summoned to the office of the Prime Minister, General Hideki Tōjō, and told that he had been chosen to defend Iwo Jima to the last. Kuribayashi was further apprised of the importance of this assignment when Tojo pointed out that the eyes of the entire nation were focused on the defense of Iwo Jima. Fully aware of the implications of the task, the general accepted, and by 8 June 1944, Kuribayashi was on his way to convert Iwo Jima into an impregnable fortress.

When he arrived, some 80 fighter aircraft were stationed on Iwo Jima, but by early July only four remained. A United States Navy force then came within sight of the island and bombarded it for two days, destroying every building and the four remaining aircraft.

Much to the surprise of the Japanese garrison on Iwo Jima, there was no American attempt to invade the island during the summer of 1944. There was little doubt that in time the Americans would attack, and General Kuribayashi was more determined than ever to exact the heaviest possible price for Iwo Jima, although the lack of naval and air support meant that Iwo Jima could not hold out indefinitely against an invader with sea and air supremacy.

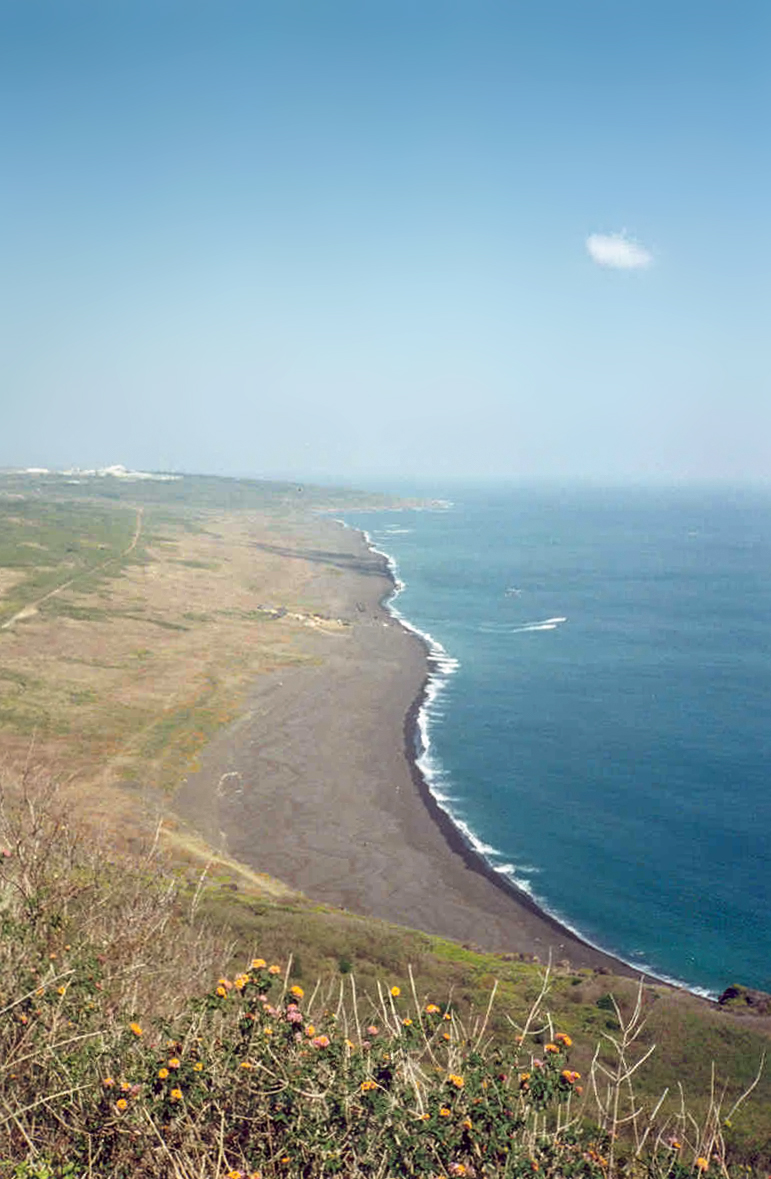
View of the invasion beach from the top of Mount Suribachi, February 2002

By late July, Kuribayashi had evacuated all civilians from the island. Lieutenant General Hideyoshi Obata, commanding general of the 31st Army, early in 1944 had been responsible for the defense of Iwo Jima prior to his return to the Marianas. Following the doctrine that an invasion had to be met practically at the water's edge, Obata had ordered the emplacement of artillery and the construction of pillboxes near the beaches. General Kuribayashi had a different strategy. Instead of attempting to hold the beaches, he planned to defend them with a sprinkling of automatic weapons and infantry. Artillery, mortars, and rockets would be emplaced on the foot and slopes of Mount Suribachi, as well as in the high ground to the north of Chidori airfield.

The reason for Kuribayashi's departure from the water's edge defense strategy, which had been the normal practice for the Japanese Imperial Army, was that he predicted that American air and naval bombardments would destroy any defenses on the beaches. It had been used at Saipan to great losses for the Japanese. For water's edge defense to work, it needed support from the air and sea, none of which the Japanese Imperial Navy was capable of mounting at this point anymore. However, other military branches, especially the navy, were still insistent on the water's edge defense and demanded that Kuribayashi see to it. In the end Kuribayashi had some pillboxes built at the beach as a token measure. The pillboxes were destroyed by American bombardment.

=== Caves, bunkers and tunnels ===
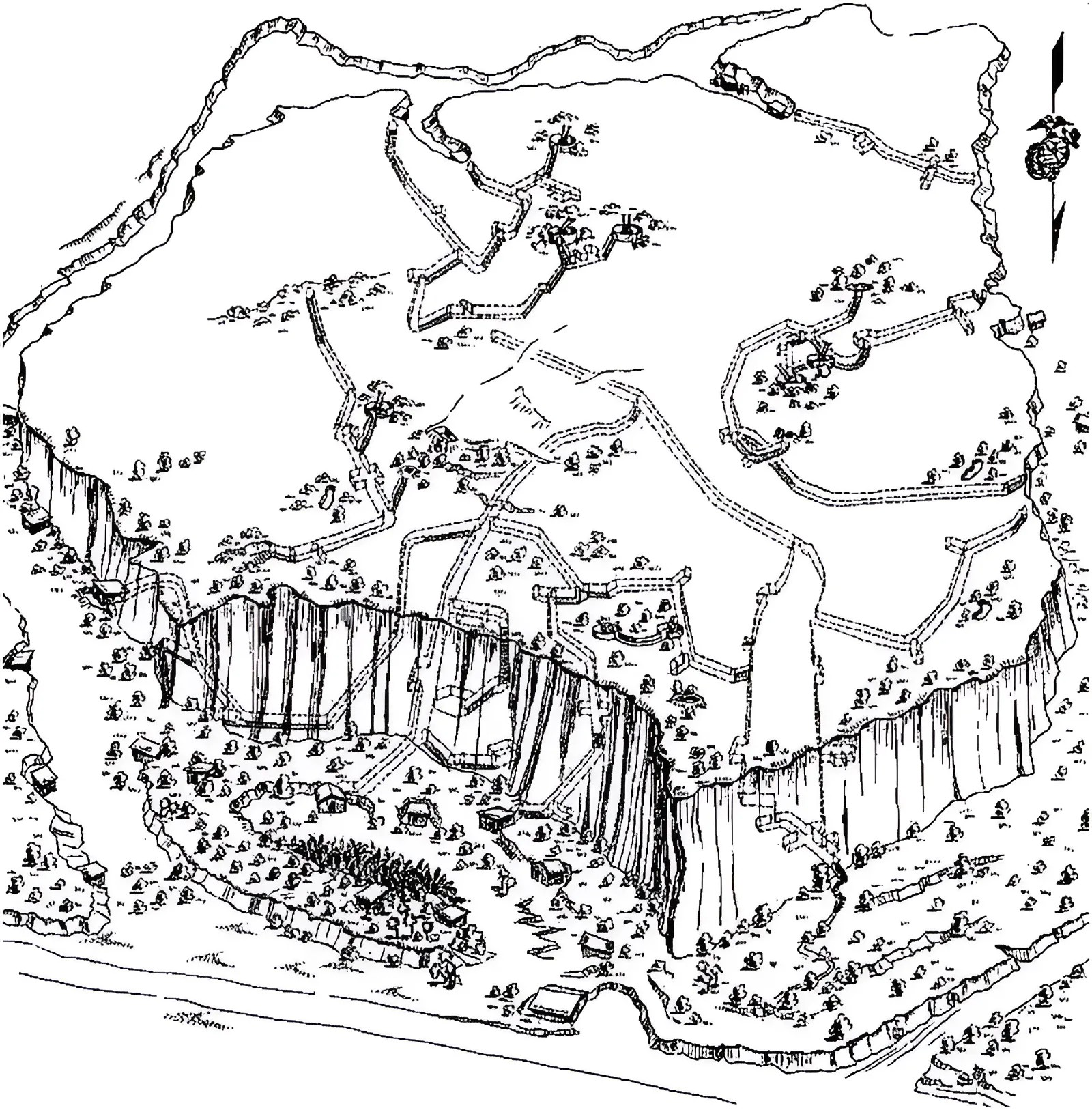
Sketch of Hill 362A, made by the 31st U.S. Naval Construction Battalion. Dotted lines show the underground Japanese tunnel system

A prolonged defense of the island required the preparation of an extensive system of caves and tunnels, for the naval bombardment had clearly shown that surface installations could not withstand extensive shelling. To this end, mining engineers were dispatched from Japan to draw blueprints for projected underground fortifications that would consist of elaborate tunnels at varying levels to assure good ventilation and minimize the effect of bombs or shells exploding near the entrances or exits.

At the same time, reinforcements were gradually beginning to reach the island. As commander of the 109th Infantry Division, General Kuribayashi decided first of all to shift the 2nd Independent Mixed Brigade, consisting of about 5,000 men under Major General Kotau Osuga, from Chichi to Iwo Jima. With the fall of Saipan, 2,700 men of the 145th Infantry Regiment, commanded by Colonel Masuo Ikeda, were diverted to Iwo Jima. These reinforcements, who reached the island during July and August 1944, brought the strength of the garrison up to approximately 12,700 men. Next came 1,233 men of the 204th Naval Construction Battalion, who quickly set to work constructing concrete pillboxes and other fortifications.

On 10 August 1944, Rear Admiral Rinosuke Ichimaru reached Iwo Jima, shortly followed by 2,216 naval personnel, including naval aviators and ground crews. The admiral, a renowned Japanese aviator, had been crippled in an airplane crash in the mid-twenties and, ever since the outbreak of the war, had chafed under repeated rear echelon assignments.

For the remainder of 1944, the construction of fortifications on Iwo also went into high gear. The Japanese were quick to discover that the black volcanic ash that existed in abundance all over the island could be converted into concrete of superior quality when mixed with cement. Pillboxes near the beaches north of Mount Suribachi were constructed of reinforced concrete, many of them with walls four feet thick. At the same time, an elaborate system of caves, concrete blockhouses, and pillboxes were established. One of the results of American air attacks and naval bombardment in the early summer of 1944 had been to drive the Japanese so deep underground that eventually their defenses became virtually immune to air or naval bombardment.

While the Japanese on Peleliu Island in the Western Carolines, also awaiting American invasion, had turned the improvement of natural caves into an art, the defenders of Iwo Jima developed it into a science. Because of the importance of the underground positions, 25% of the garrison was detailed to tunneling. Positions constructed underground ranged in size from small caves for a few men to several underground chambers capable of holding 300 or 400 men. In order to prevent personnel from becoming trapped in any one excavation, the subterranean installations were provided with multiple entrances and exits, as well as stairways and interconnecting passageways. Special attention had to be paid to providing adequate ventilation, since sulphur fumes were present in many of the underground installations. Fortunately for the Japanese, most of the volcanic stone on Iwo was so soft that it could be cut with hand tools.

General Kuribayashi established his command post in the northern part of the island, about 500 m northeast of Kita village and south of Kitano Point. This installation, 20 m underground, consisted of caves of varying sizes, connected by 150 m of tunnels. Here the island commander had his own war room in one of three small concrete enclosed chambers; the two similar rooms were used by the staff. Farther south on Hill 382, the second highest elevation on the island, the Japanese constructed a radio and weather station. Nearby, on an elevation just southeast of the station, an enormously large blockhouse was constructed which served as the headquarters of Colonel Chosaku Kaidō, who commanded all artillery on Iwo Jima. Other hills in the northern portion of the island were tunnelled out. All of these major excavations featured multiple entrances and exits and were virtually invulnerable to damage from artillery or aerial bombardment. Typical of the thoroughness employed in the construction of subterranean defenses was the main communications center south of Kita village, which was so spacious that it contained a chamber 50 m long and 20 m wide. This giant structure was similar in construction and thickness of walls and ceilings to General Kuribayashi's command post. A 150 m tunnel 20 m below the ground led into this vast subterranean chamber.

Perhaps the most ambitious construction project to get under way was the creation of an underground passageway designed to link all major defense installations on the island. As projected, this passageway was to have attained a total length of almost 27 km (17 mi). Had it been completed, it would have linked the formidable underground installations in the northern portion of Iwo Jima with the southern part of the island, where the northern slope of Mount Suribachi alone harbored several thousand yards of tunnels. By the time the Marines landed on Iwo Jima, more than 18 km (11 mi) of tunnels had been completed.

A supreme effort was required of the Japanese personnel engaged in the underground construction work. Aside from the heavy physical labor, the men were exposed to heat from 30–50 °C (86–122 °F), as well as sulphur fumes that forced them to wear gas masks. In numerous instances a work detail had to be relieved after only five minutes. Renewed American air attacks struck the island on 8 December 1944 and became a daily occurrence until the actual invasion of the island. Subsequently, a large number of men had to be diverted to repairing the damaged airfields.

=== Artillery ===
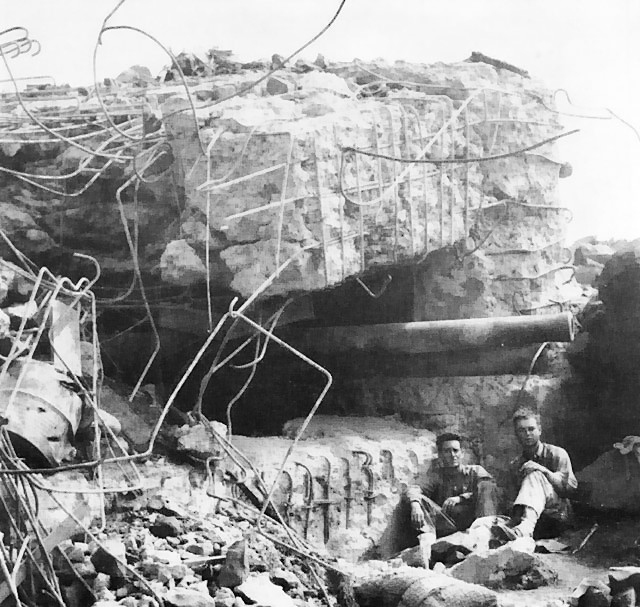
Japanese 120 mm gun after the battle on Iwo Jima (knocked-out prior to D-Day)

Next to arrive on Iwo Jima were artillery units and five anti-tank battalions. Even though numerous supply ships en route to Iwo Jima were sunk by American submarines and aircraft, substantial quantities of materiel did reach Iwo Jima during the summer and autumn of 1944. By the end of the year, General Kuribayashi had available to him 361 artillery pieces of 75 mm or larger caliber, a dozen 320 mm mortars, 65 medium (150 mm) and light (81 mm) mortars, 33 naval guns 80 mm or larger, and 94 anti-aircraft guns 75 mm or larger. In addition to this formidable array of large caliber guns, the Iwo Jima defenses could boast more than 200 20 mm and 25 mm anti-aircraft guns and 69 37 mm and 47 mm antitank guns.

The firepower of the artillery was further augmented with a variety of rockets varying from an eight-inch type that weighed 90 kg and could travel 2–3 km, to a giant 250 kg projectile that had a range of more than 7 km. Altogether, 70 rocket guns and their crews reached Iwo Jima.

=== Tanks ===
In order to further strengthen the Iwo defenses, the 26th Tank Regiment, which had been stationed at Pusan, Korea after extended service in Manchuria, received orders to head for Iwo Jima. The officer commanding this regiment was Lieutenant Colonel Baron Takeichi Nishi, a 1932 Olympic gold medallist. The regiment, consisting of 600 men and 28 tanks, sailed from Japan in mid-July on board the Nisshu Maru. On 18 July 1944, as the ship, sailing in a convoy, approached Chichi Jima, it was torpedoed by an American submarine, USS Cobia. Even though only two members of the 26th Tank Regiment were killed, all of the regiment's 28 tanks went to the bottom of the sea. It would be December before these tanks could be replaced. The 22 tanks which finally reached Iwo Jima included medium Type 97 Chi-Ha and light Type 95 Ha-Go tanks. Neither of these types were near comparable to the better armed and better armored M4 Sherman medium tanks fielded by the Americans.

Initially, Colonel Nishi had planned to employ his armor as a type of "roving fire brigade", to be committed at focal points of combat. The rugged terrain precluded such employment and, in the end, the tanks were deployed in static positions under the colonel's watchful eyes. They were either buried or their turrets were dismounted and so skillfully emplaced in the rocky ground that they were practically invisible from the air or the ground. The headquarters of the 26th Tank Regiment, which was located near the village of Maruman, was moved to the eastern part of the island when the battle began.

=== Defense planning ===
While Iwo Jima was being converted into a major fortress with all possible speed, General Kuribayashi formulated his final plans for the defense of the island. This plan, which constituted a radical departure from the defensive tactics used by the Japanese earlier in the war, provided for the following major points:

1. In order to prevent disclosing their positions to the Americans, Japanese artillery was to remain silent during the expected prelanding bombardment. No fire would be directed against the American naval vessels.
2. Upon landing on Iwo Jima, the Americans were not to encounter any opposition on the beaches.
3. Once the Americans had advanced about 500 m inland, they were to be taken under the concentrated fire of automatic weapons stationed in the vicinity of Motoyama airfield to the north, as well as automatic weapons and artillery emplaced both on the high ground to the north of the landing beaches and Mount Suribachi to the south.
4. After inflicting maximum possible casualties and damage on the landing force, the artillery was to displace northward from the high ground near the Chidori airfield.

In this connection, Kuribayashi stressed once again that he planned to conduct an elastic defense designed to wear down the invasion force. Such prolonged resistance naturally required the defending force to stockpile rations and ammunition. To this end the island commander accumulated a food reserve to last for two and a half months, ever mindful of the fact that the trickle of supplies that was reaching Iwo Jima during the latter part of 1944 would cease altogether once the island was surrounded by a hostile naval force.

During the final months of preparing Iwo Jima for the defense, General Kuribayashi saw to it that the strenuous work of building fortifications did not interfere with the training of units. As an initial step towards obtaining more time for training, he ordered work on the northernmost airfield on the island halted. In an operations order issued in early December, the island commander set 11 February 1945 as the target date for completion of defensive preparations and specified that personnel were to spend 70% of their time in training and 30% in construction work.

Despite intermittent harassment by American submarines and aircraft, additional personnel continued to arrive on Iwo until February 1945. By that time General Kuribayashi had under his command a force totaling between 21,000 and 23,000 men, including both Army and Navy units.

=== Lines of defense ===
General Kuribayashi made several changes in his basic defense plan in the months preceding the American invasion of Iwo Jima. The final strategy, which became effective in January 1945, called for the creation of strong, mutually supporting positions which were to be defended to the death. Neither large scale counterattacks, withdrawals, nor banzai charges were contemplated. The southern portion of Iwo in the proximity of Mount Suribachi was organized into a semi-independent defense sector. Fortifications included casemated coast artillery and automatic weapons in mutually supporting pillboxes. The narrow isthmus to the north of Suribachi was to be defended by a small infantry force. On the other hand, this entire area was exposed to the fire of artillery, rocket launchers, and mortars emplaced on Suribachi to the south and the high ground to the north.

A main line of defense, consisting of mutually supporting positions in depth, extended from the northwestern part of the island to the southeast, along a general line from the cliffs to the northwest, across Motoyama Airfield No. 2 to Minami village. From there it continued eastward to the shoreline just south of Tachiiwa Point. The entire line of defense was dotted with pillboxes, bunkers, and blockhouses. Colonel Nishi's immobilized tanks, carefully dug in and camouflaged, further reinforced this fortified area, whose strength was supplemented by the broken terrain. A second line of defense extended from a few hundred yards south of Kitano Point at the very northern tip of Iwo across the still uncompleted Airfield No. 3, to Motoyama village, and then to the area between Tachiiwa Point and the East Boat Basin. This second line contained fewer man-made fortifications, but the Japanese took maximum advantage of natural caves and other terrain features.

As an additional means of protecting the two completed airfields on Iwo from direct assault, the Japanese constructed a number of antitank ditches near the fields and mined all natural routes of approach. When, on 2 January, more than a dozen B-24 Liberator bombers raided Airfield No. 1 and inflicted heavy damage, Kuribayashi diverted more than 600 men, 11 trucks, and 2 bulldozers for immediate repairs, rendering the airfield operational within only 12 hours. Eventually, 2,000 men were assigned the job of filling the bomb craters, with as many as 50 men detailed to one crater. By the end of 1944 American B-24 bombers were over Iwo Jima almost every night, and U.S. Navy carriers and cruisers frequently sortied into the Ogasawaras. On 8 December 1944, American aircraft dropped more than 800 tons of bombs on Iwo Jima, which did very little real damage to the island defenses. Even though frequent air raids interfered with the Japanese defensive preparations and robbed the garrison of badly needed sleep, work was not materially slowed.

As early as 5 January 1945, Admiral Ichimaru conducted a briefing of naval personnel at his command post in which he informed them of the destruction of the Japanese Fleet at the Battle of Leyte Gulf, the loss of the Philippines, and the expectation that Iwo would shortly be invaded. Exactly one month later, Japanese radio operators on Iwo reported to the island commander that code signals of American aircraft had undergone an ominous change. On 13 February, a Japanese naval patrol plane spotted 170 American ships moving northwestward from Saipan. All Japanese troops in the Ogasawaras were alerted and occupied their battle positions. On Iwo Jima, preparations for the pending battle had been completed, and the defenders were ready.

== American planning ==
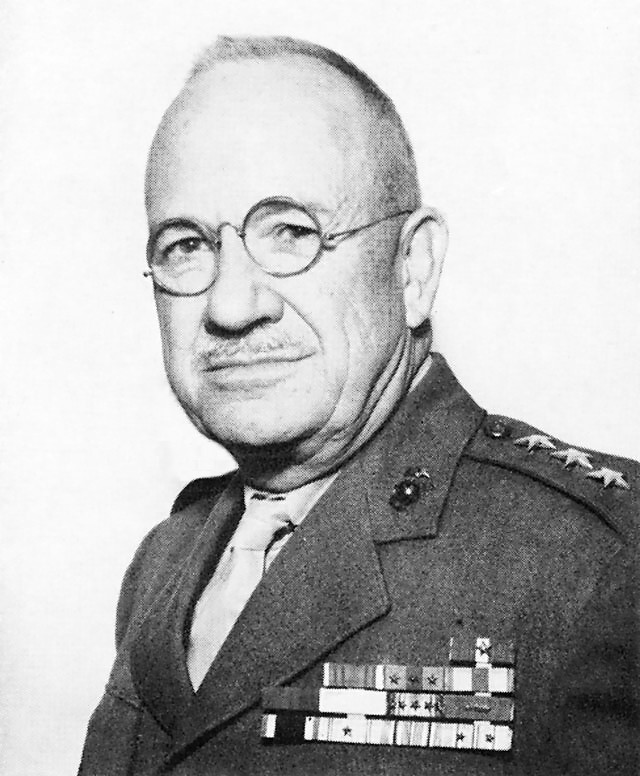
Holland Smith, commander of the assaulting U.S. forces

The origins of the battle lie in the complex politics of the Pacific theater, in which operational control was divided between the South West Pacific Area (command) of General Douglas MacArthur and the Pacific Ocean Areas (command) led by Admiral Chester Nimitz. The potential for interservice rivalry between the Army and Navy created by this partition of responsibility was exacerbated by similar divisions within the Joint Chiefs of Staff (JCS) in Washington. By September 1944, the two services could not come to an agreement about the main direction of advance towards the Japanese home islands in the coming year. The Army was pressing for the chief effort to be an invasion of Formosa (Taiwan), in which MacArthur would be in overall command and in which it would predominate.

The Navy however preferred the idea of an operation against Okinawa, which would be a mainly seaborne effort. Seeking to gain leverage and so break the impasse, on 29 September Nimitz suggested to Admiral Ernest King that as a preliminary to the Okinawa offensive the island of Iwo Jima could be taken. The tiny island lacked harbors and so was of no direct interest to the Navy, but for some time General Henry Harley Arnold of the U.S. Army Air Forces had been lobbying to take Iwo Jima. He argued that an airbase there would provide useful fighter escort cover for the B-29 Superfortresses of his XX Bomber Command, then beginning its strategic bombing campaign against the Japanese home islands (the later role of Iwo Jima as a refueling station for B-29s played no part in the original decision-making process). Arnold's support in the JCS enabled the Navy to get Okinawa rather than Formosa approved as the main target on 2 October. At this time the Iwo Jima invasion was expected to be a brief prologue to the main campaign, with relatively light casualties; King assumed that Nimitz would be able to reuse three of the Marine Corps divisions assigned to Iwo Jima for the attack on Okinawa, which was originally scheduled to take place just forty days later.

On 7 October 1944, Admiral Chester Nimitz and his staff issued a staff study for preliminary planning, which clearly listed the objectives of Operation Detachment. The overriding purpose of the operation was to maintain unremitting military pressure against Japan and to extend American control over the Western Pacific. Three tasks specifically envisioned in the study were the reduction of enemy naval and air strength and industrial facilities in the home islands; the destruction of Japanese naval and air strength in the Bonin Islands, and the capture, occupation, and subsequent defense of Iwo Jima, which was to be developed into an air base. Nimitz's directive declared that "long range bombers should be provided with fighter support at the earliest practicable time", and as such Iwo Jima was "admirably situated as a fighter base for supporting long range bombers."

On 9 October, General Holland Smith received the staff study, accompanied by a directive from Admiral Nimitz ordering the seizure of Iwo Jima. This directive designated specific commanders for the operation. Admiral Raymond A. Spruance, Commander, Fifth Fleet, was placed in charge as Operation Commander, Task Force 50. Under Spruance, Vice Admiral Richmond Kelly Turner, Commander, Amphibious Forces, Pacific, was to command the Joint Expeditionary Force, Task Force 51. Second in command of the Joint Expeditionary Force was Rear Admiral Harry W. Hill. General Holland Smith was designated Commanding General, Expeditionary Troops, Task Force 56.

It was not accidental that these men were selected to command an operation of such vital importance that it has since become known as "the most classical amphibious assault of recorded history." All of them had shown their mettle in previous engagements. One chronicler of the Iwo Jima operation put it in the following words:

"The team assigned to Iwo Jima was superb: the very men who had perfected the amphibious techniques from the Battle of Guadalcanal to the Battle of Guam. Nearly every problem, it was believed, had been met and mastered along the way, from the jungles of Guadalcanal up through the Solomons, and across the Central Pacific from the bloody reefs of Battle of Tarawa to the mountains of the Marianas."

=== Primary plan ===
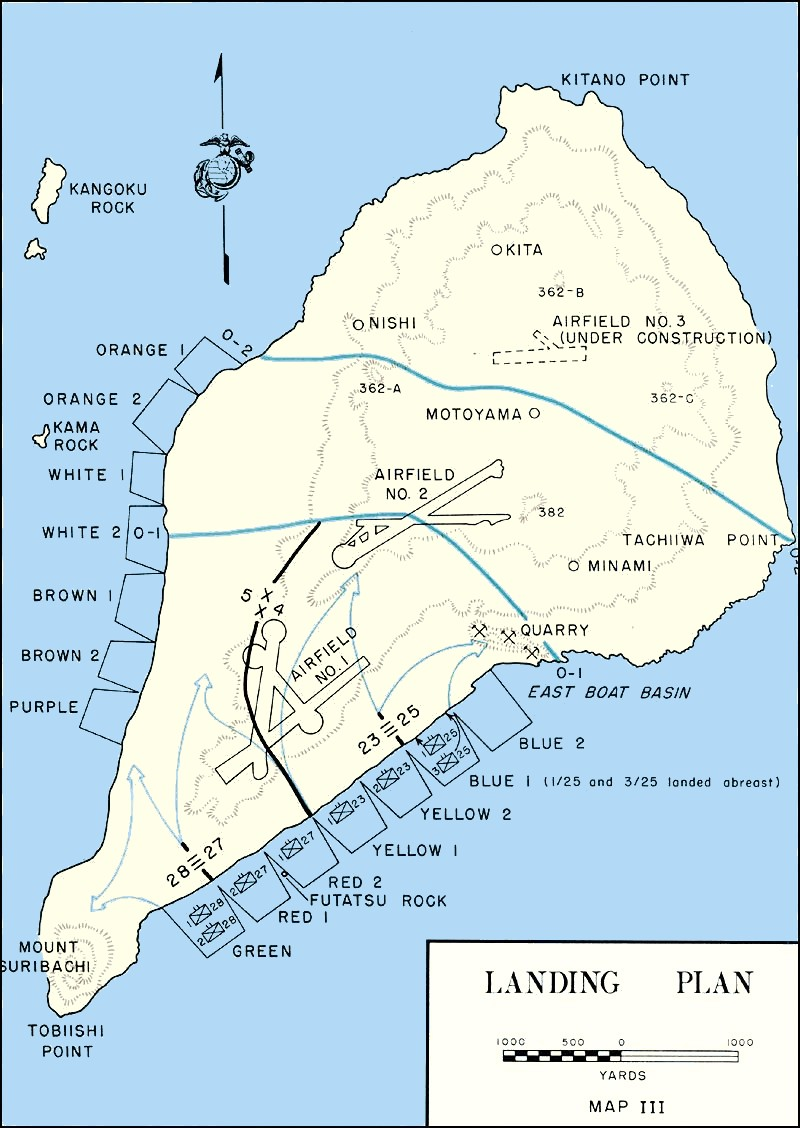
American landing plan

The U.S. V Amphibious Corps (VAC) scheme of maneuver for the landings was relatively simple. The 4th and 5th Marine Divisions were to land abreast on the eastern beaches, the 4th on the right and the 5th on the left. When released to VAC, the 3rd Marine Division, as Expeditionary Troops Reserve, was to land over the same beaches to take part in the attack or play a defensive role, whichever was called for. The plan called for a rapid exploitation of the beachhead with an advance in a northeasterly direction to capture the entire island. A regiment of the 5th Marine Division was designated to capture Mount Suribachi in the south.

The detailed scheme of maneuver for the landings provided for the 28th Marine Regiment of the 5th Marine Division, commanded by Colonel Harry B. Liversedge, to land on the extreme left of the corps on Green 1. On the right of the 28th Marines, the 27th Marine Regiment, under Colonel Thomas A. Wornham, was to attack towards the west coast of the island, then wheel northeastward and seize the O-1 Line. Action by the 27th and 28th Marines was designed to drive the enemy from the commanding heights along the southern portion of Iwo, simultaneously securing the flanks and rear of VAC. As far as the 4th Marine Division was concerned, the 23rd Marine Regiment, commanded by Colonel Walter W. Wensinger, was to go ashore on Yellow 1 and 2 beaches, seize Motoyama Airfield No. 1, then turn to the northeast and seize that part of Motoyama Airfield No. 2 and the O-1 Line within its zone of action. After landing on Blue Beach 1, the 25th Marine Regiment, under Colonel John R. Lanigan, was to assist in the capture of Airfield No. 1, the capture of Blue Beach 2, and the O-1 Line within its zone of action. The 24th Marine Regiment, under Colonel Walter I. Jordan, was to be held in 4th Marine Division reserve during the initial landings. The U.S. 26th Marine Regiment, led by Colonel Chester B. Graham, was to be released from corps reserve on D-Day and prepared to support the 5th Marine Division.

Division artillery was to go ashore on order from the respective division commanders. The 4th Marine Division was to be supported by the 14th Marine Regiment, commanded by Colonel Louis G. DeHaven; Colonel James D. Waller's 13th Marine Regiment was to furnish similar support for the 5th Marine Division.

The operation was to be timed so that at H-Hour 68 Landing Vehicle Tracked (LVT), comprising the first wave, were to hit the beach. These vehicles were to advance inland until they reached the first terrace beyond the high-water mark. The armored amphibians would use their 75 mm howitzers and machine guns to the utmost in an attempt to keep the enemy down, thus giving some measure of protection to succeeding waves of Marines who were most vulnerable to enemy fire at the time they disembarked from their LVTs. Though early versions of the VAC operations plan had called for the Sherman tanks of the 4th and 5th Tank Battalions to be landed at H plus 30, subsequent studies of the beaches made it necessary to adopt a more flexible schedule. The possibility of congestion at the water's edge also contributed to this change in plans. In the end, the time for bringing the tanks ashore was left to the discretion of the regimental commanders.

=== Alternate plan ===
Since there was a possibility of unfavorable surf conditions along the eastern beaches, VAC issued an alternative plan on 8 January 1945, which provided for a landing on the western beaches. However, since predominant northerly or northwesterly winds caused hazardous swells almost continuously along the southwest side of the island, it appeared unlikely that this alternative plan would be put into effect.

== See also ==
- List of World War II military equipment
- Naval Base Iwo Jima
