= 28th Marine Regiment (United States) =

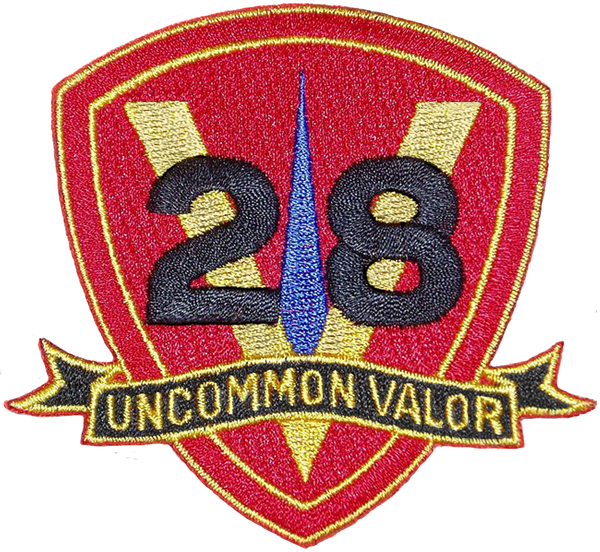
- 28th Marines emblem
- Active: 1944–1946, 1967–1969
- Country: United States of America
- Branch: United States Marine Corps
- Type: Infantry
- Size: 3,250
- Part of: 5th Marine Division
- Motto: Uncommon Valor
- Mascot: "Roscoe"—Lion
- Engagements: World War II: Battle of Iwo Jima

Commanders
- Notable commanders: Harry B. Liversedge

The 28th Marine Regiment (28th Marines) is an infantry regiment of the United States Marine Corps. The regiment (inactive since the Vietnam War), which is part of the 5th Marine Division, fought in the Battle of Iwo Jima during World War II. Six Marines of the 2nd Battalion, 28th Marines were featured in the historical photo by Joe Rosenthal of the U.S. flag raising on top of Mount Suribachi.

== Subordinate units ==
The regiment comprised three infantry battalions, headquarters and service company, and the regimental weapons company:

Battalions
Headquarters & Service Company, 28th Marines
1st Battalion, 28th Marines (1/28)
2nd Battalion, 28th Marines (2/28)
3rd Battalion, 28th Marines (3/28)

== History ==
=== Formation and preparation for combat ===
The 28th Marine Regiment was activated on 8 February 1944 at Marine Corps Base Camp Pendleton, California. Many of the first members of the regiment had previously been members of the recently disbanded Raiders and Paramarines. The regiment was initially staged at Tent Camp 1 in the Las Pulgas Valley on Camp Pendleton. Upon completion of their training in late September to early October they boarded troop ships in San Diego, California and sailed to Hilo, Hawaii, where they would eventually call Camp Tarawa home. They remained there for the next four months training for their first mission.

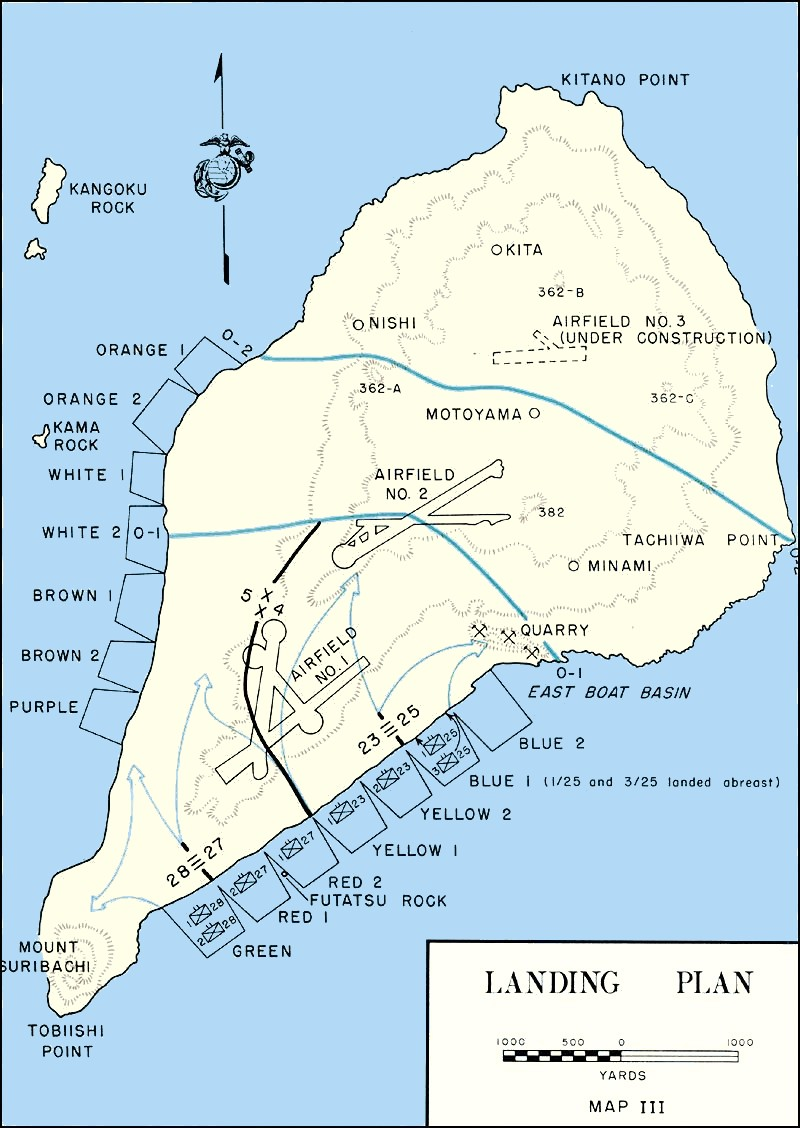
Landing plan for the assault on Iwo Jima. The 28th Marines would land at Green Beach on the far left flank of the eastern beach.

The 28th Marines was originally scheduled to assault Yap in the Caroline Islands in the fall of 1944 but a change in strategy at higher levels would allow for a few more months of training and planning for the next mission. On 19 October 1944, Colonel Liversedge received tentative plans for the invasion of Iwo Jima and would set in place two more months of intensive training preparing his men for the amphibious assault upon the volcanic island. The plan created by the efforts of the V Amphibious Corps in November and December 1944 called for the 28th Marines to land at Green Beach which was on the far left of the landing zone, just at the base of Mount Suribachi. The 1st and 2nd Battalions, 28th Marines were to drive across the 750 yard neck of the island and cut off the mountain from the rest of the island. The 3rd Battalion, 28th Marines was placed in reserve for the initial assault.

The 28th Marines embarked upon amphibious transports in late December and after a few days liberty in Pearl Harbor they set sail heading west on 7 January 1945. The regiment stopped at Eniwetok on 5 February, conducted a practice landing on Tinian on 13 February and arrived off the coast of Iwo Jima on 16 February.

=== Iwo Jima ===
The first portions of the 28th Marines landed on Iwo Jima at Green Beach just after 09:00 on 19 February 1945. The 1st and 2nd Battalion, 28th Marines were first ashore and within 90 minutes of hitting the beach small units from these battalions had reached the west coast of the island. The 3rd Battalion, 28th Marines was fully ashore by 13:00 that afternoon, having taken heavy casualties in the water and while crossing the beach. By late in the afternoon the regiment had isolated Mount Suribachi and began to commence its attacks south against the defenders of the island redoubt. The 28th Marines were the only one of the four regiments that landed on D-Day to achieve their objectives.

From 19 to 23 February, the 28th Marines fought to secure Mount Suribachi. Progress was initially slow and measured in yards as they had to fight their way through hundreds of layered and mutually supporting Japanese pillboxes, blockhouses, spiderholes and strongpoints. By the morning of 23 February, Suribachi had been encircled. Col. Liversledge called for a reconnaissance patrol to scale the mountain a find a path to the top if possible. Chosen for the mission was the 3rd Platoon, Easy Company, 2nd Battalion, 28th Marines. These men reached the summit at approximately 10:20 and proceeded to raise a U.S. flag. It was the raising of this flag that led the then Secretary of the Navy, James Forrestal, to comment that "...the raising of that flag on Suribachi means a Marine Corps for the next five hundred years". Fearing that the flag would be taken by higher-ups, Lt. Col. Chandler W. Johnson, commander of the 2nd Battalion, 28th Marines, ordered a second patrol to the top of the mountain to replace the flag with a larger one that could later be given to any senior ranking personnel that wanted it as he intended for the first flag to remain with the battalion. It was the raising of this second flag that was caught on film by Joe Rosenthal and would become the iconic photo of the battle. The regiment relied heavily on flamethrower operators during the close-quarters assault. Corporal Don Graves of the 2nd Battalion was the only flamethrower operator in his battalion to survive the battle without sustaining injuries.

=== Post–Iwo Jima and inactivation ===
After the Battle of Iwo Jima, the 28th Marines, 5th Marine Division sailed back to Hawaii and Camp Tarawa where it began to refit for the planned invasion of Japan. They were tasked with being part of Operation Olympic, the planned invasion of Kyushu. Upon the Surrender of Japan, the regiment sailed for mainland Japan where it landed at the port of Sasebo on September 22, 1945, becoming part of the American occupation force. Three months later the regiment sailed again this time for Marine Corps Base Camp Pendleton, California. The 28th Marines was decommissioned on January 28, 1946 at MCB Camp Pendleton, CA as part of the post-war drawdown of forces.

=== Vietnam-era reactivation ===
The 28th Marines was reactivated at Camp Pendleton on 31 January 1967 and assigned to the newly reactivated 5th Marine Division. While the division's 26th and 27th Marines served in Vietnam, the 28th Marines remained at Camp Pendleton as a reaction force and training unit for personnel bound for Vietnam. The regiment was deactivated on 26 November 1969.

== See also ==
- Flags of Our Fathers
- History of the United States Marine Corps
- List of United States Marine Corps regiments
