= Operation Flintlock ground order of battle =

Order of battle for World War II battle

Map of the Marshall Islands and a detailed map of Kwajalein Atoll

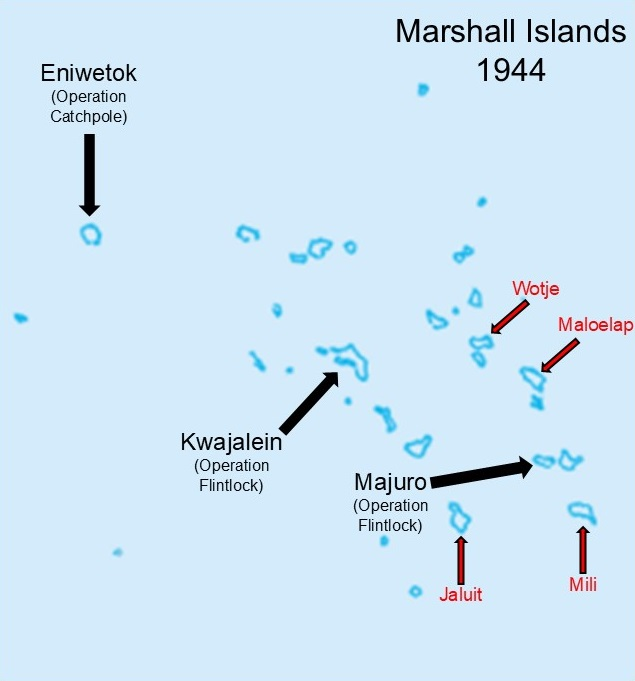
Sites of US conquest are indicated in black; Japanese-held atolls indicated in red were bypassed.

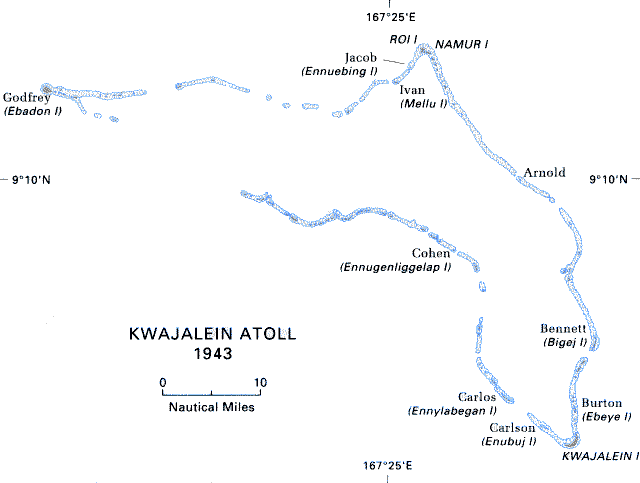
Roi-Namur is in the upper right corner, Kwajalein Island in the bottom corner; islands are designated with US codenames with native names in parentheses.

Naval commanders

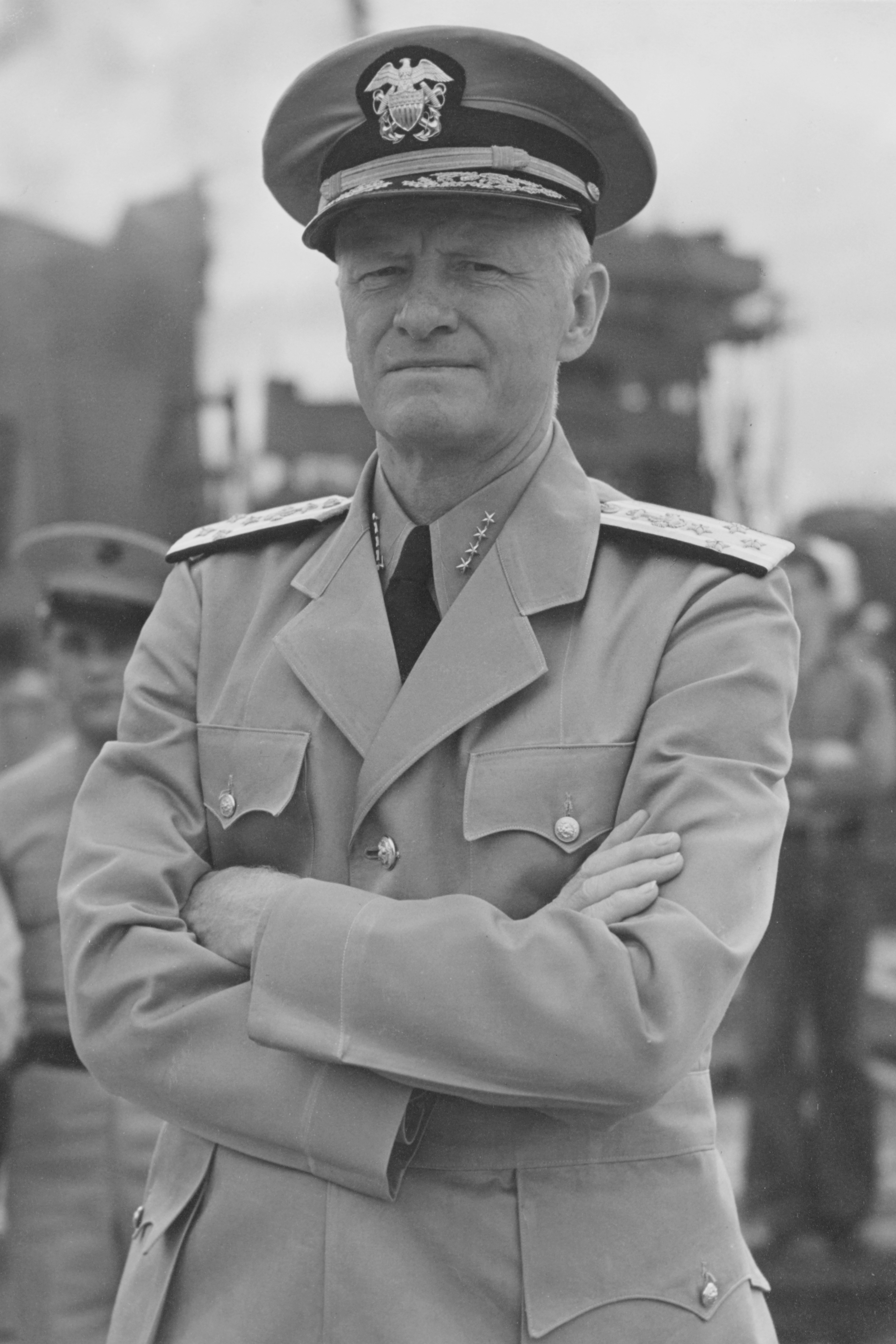
Adm. Chester W. Nimitz

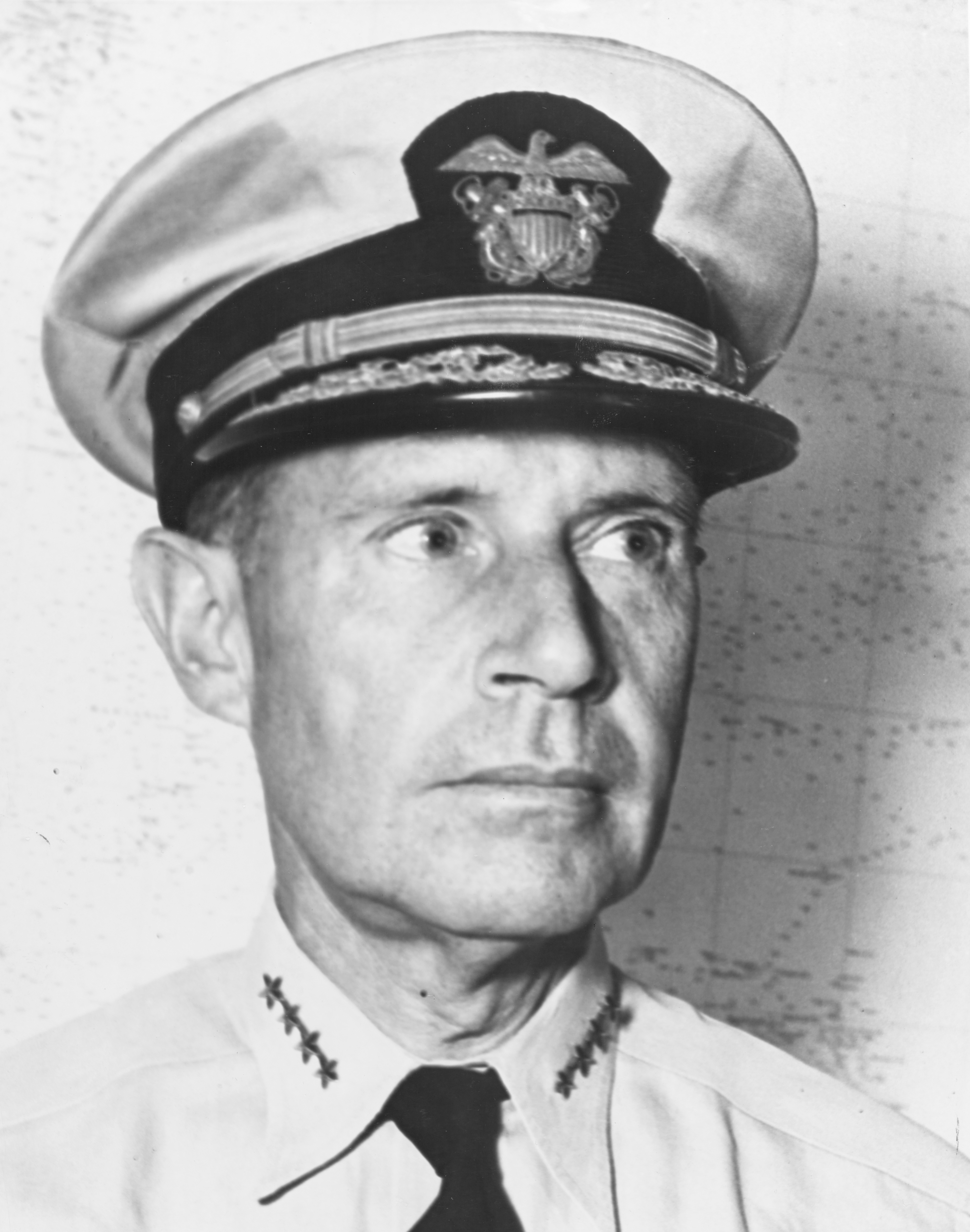
Raymond A. Spruance as a full admiral

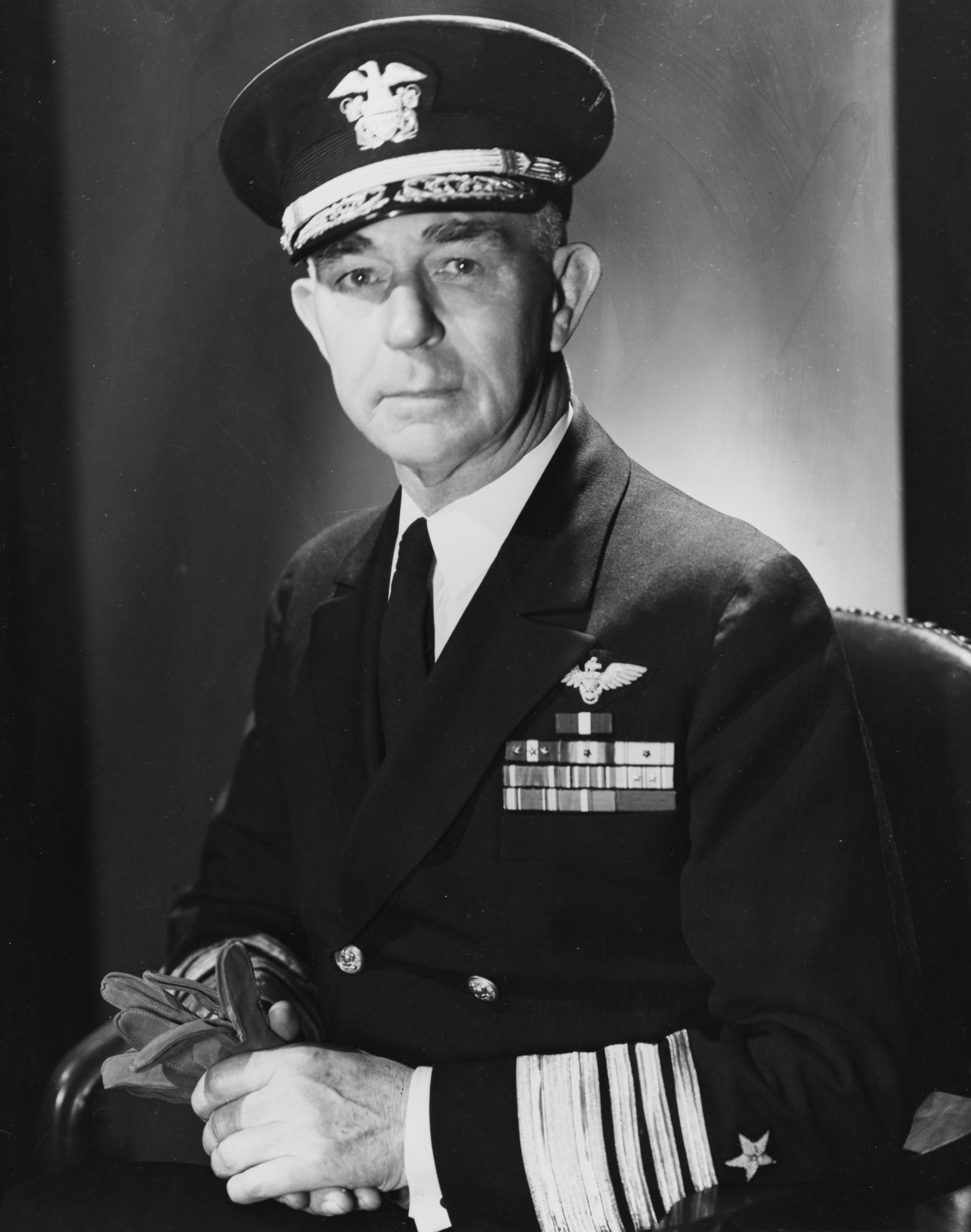
Richmond Kelly Turner as a full admiral

Ground force commanders

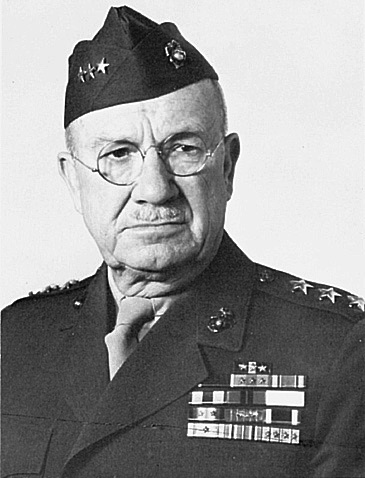
Lieut. Gen. Holland M. Smith, USMC

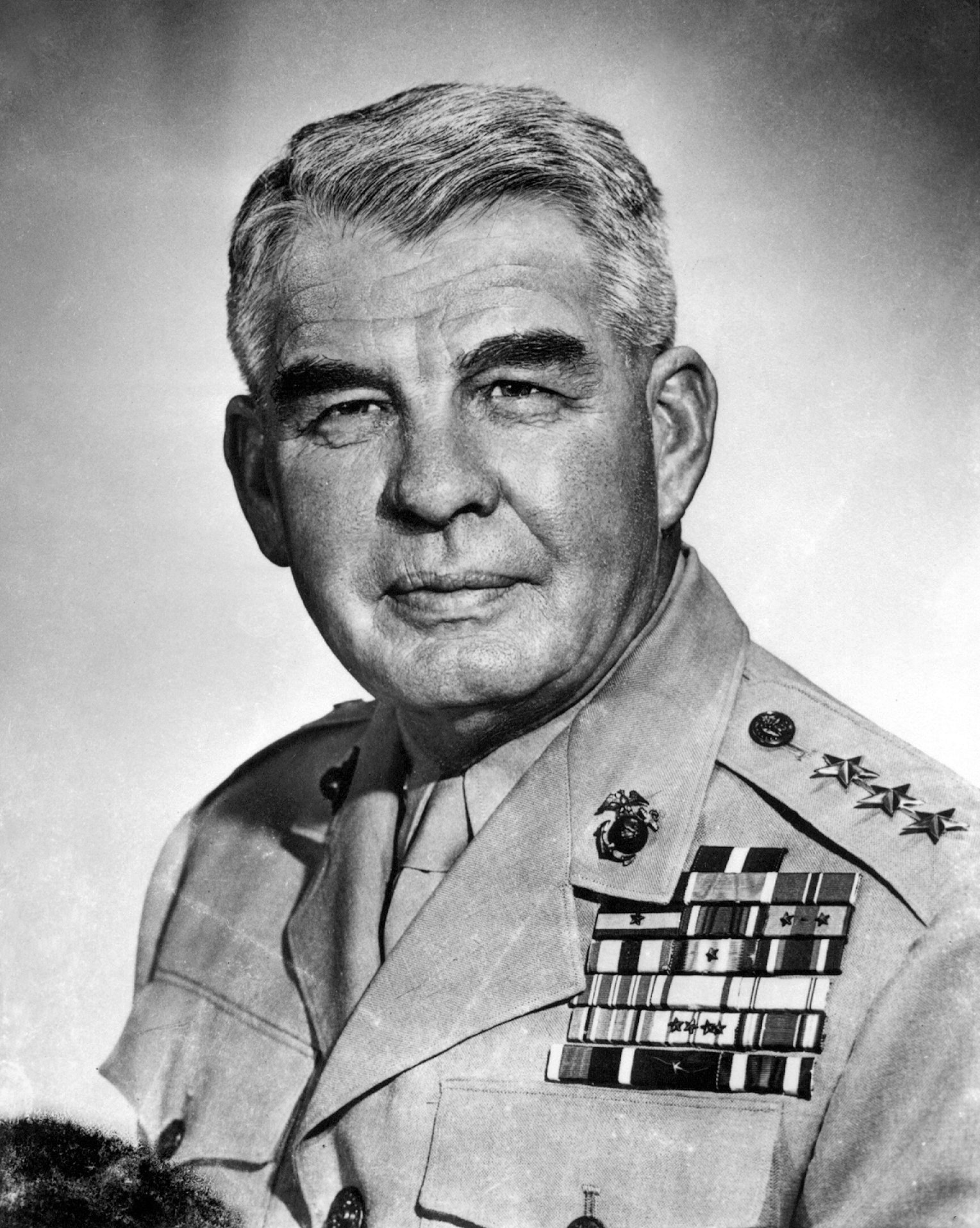
Harry Schmidt, USMC, as a lieut. general

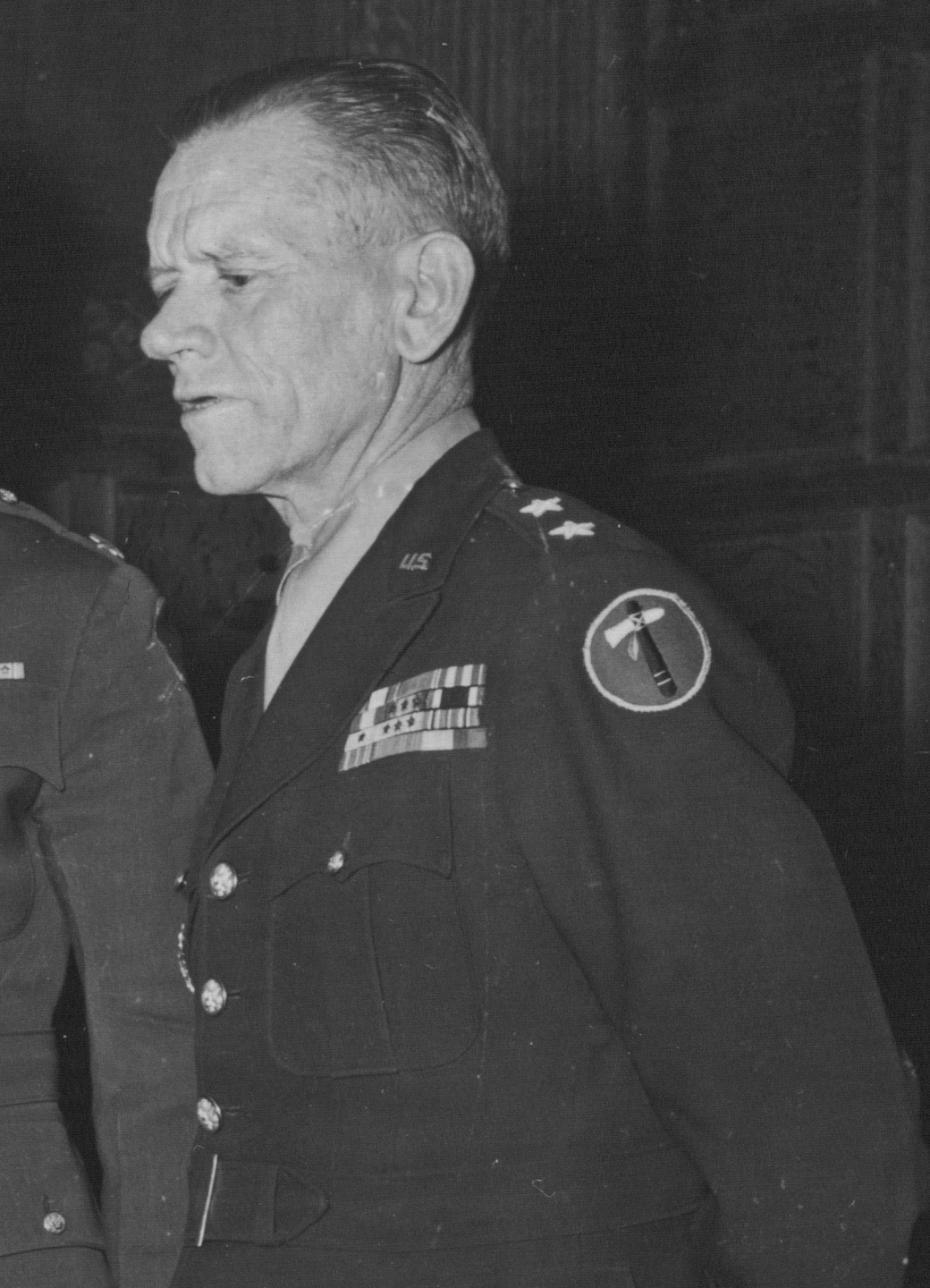
Maj. Gen. Charles H. Corlett, USA

This is the order of battle of the ground forces deployed for Operation Flintlock, a phase of the Pacific Theatre of World War II. Flintlock consisted of simultaneous landings by men of the United States Marine Corps and United States Army at Majuro Atoll and Kwajalein Atoll, both located in the Marshall Islands in the Central Pacific, on 31 January 1944.

Forces of Imperial Japan held several sites in the Marshalls.

- Majuro Atoll was targeted by US planners because it would provide an excellent fleet anchorage; its capture was the responsibility of the 2nd Battalion (reinf.) of the US Army's 106th Infantry Regiment plus a reconnaissance company of Marines. Because the Japanese had abandoned it over a year earlier, the atoll was declared secure at 0950 hours on D-Day.
- The Japanese command considered Kwajalein Atoll, unlike Majuro, to be vital to the defense of the Marshalls. (Note: "That atoll was the hub of the enemy's outer defensive perimeter and the distributing center for his Marshall Islands spider's web.") and had heavily fortified both of its major islands.

Kwajalein is shaped roughly like a boomerang.
- Capture of the connected islands of Roi-Namur, located in the northeast corner of the atoll, was the responsibility of the 4th Marine Division. Roi was declared secure at 1802 hours on D+1, Namur at 1418 hours on D+2.
- Kwajalein Island is located at the south corner of the atoll; its capture was assigned to the US Army's 7th Infantry Division. The island was declared secure at 1618 hours on D+4.

- Eniwetok Atoll, being the furthest to the northwest, lay astride the air supply route for the Japanese, making it another objective for US planners. It was captured as the result of Operation Catchpole in February.

Four other atolls held by the Japanese in the Marshalls (Wotje, Maloelap, Mili and Jaluit) all contained a seaplane base, an airfield or both. These sites were simply bypassed as part of the US "island-hopping" strategy.

== Naval command ==
The roles of Commander in Chief, Pacific Ocean Areas (CINCPOA) and Commander in Chief, U.S. Pacific Fleet (CINCPAC), were both exercised by Admiral Chester W. Nimitz from his headquarters at Pearl Harbor, Hawaii.

Since the Marshalls lie in the Central Pacific, their capture was the responsibility of the U.S. Fifth Fleet, led by Vice Admiral Raymond A. Spruance from aboard his flagship, heavy cruiser Indianapolis.

The ships and troops of Operations Flintlock were under direct operational command of Rear Admiral Richmond Kelly Turner aboard amphibious command ship Rocky Mount.

Since the Japanese Combined Fleet had stripped most of its air power to defend the base at Rabaul, Admiral Mineichi Koga chose not to challenge the American operations in the Marshalls.

== Ground troops ==
V Amphibious Corps (Lieut. Gen. Holland M. Smith), USMC

Roi-Namur Islands

4th Marine Division (Maj. Gen. Harry Schmidt, USMC)
24,902 officers and enlisted

Kwajalein Island

7th Infantry Division (Maj. Gen. Charles H. Corlett, USA)
21,768 officers and enlisted

== U.S. forces ==
V Amphibious Corps
Lieutenant General Holland M. Smith (Note: Generated so much ill-will between the services that he was eventually reassigned stateside.)

=== Marine Corps (Northern Kwajalein) ===
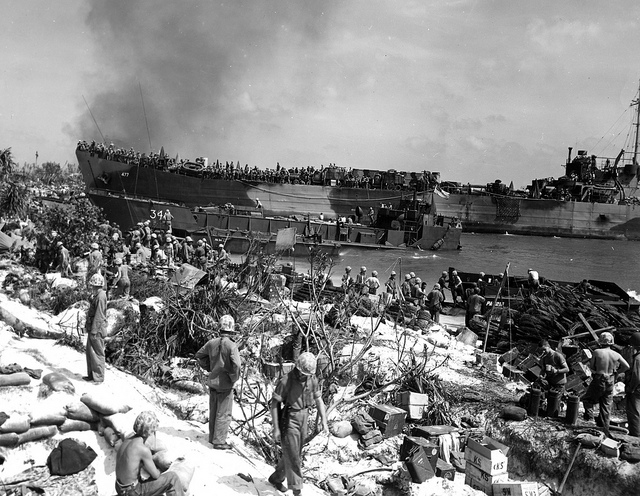
121st Naval Construction Battalion landing on Roi-Namur as 3rd Battalion, 20th Marines

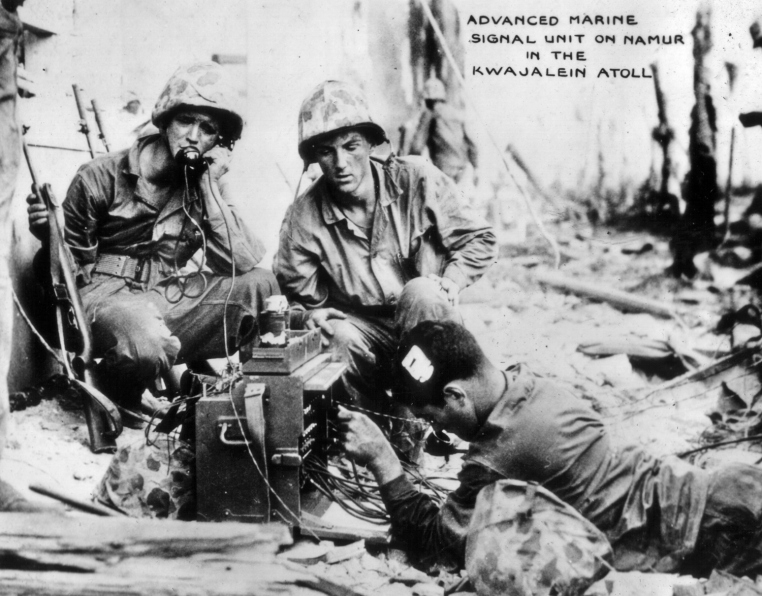
Radio Operators from 3rd Battalion, 24th Marines, under fire on Namur

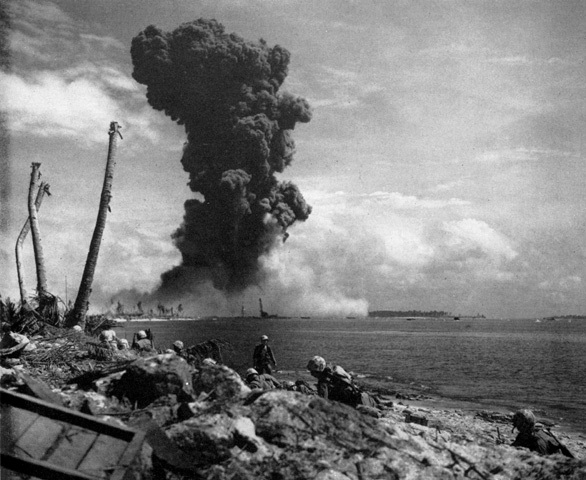
Explosion of a torpedo warhead magazine on Namur, 1 Feb 1944

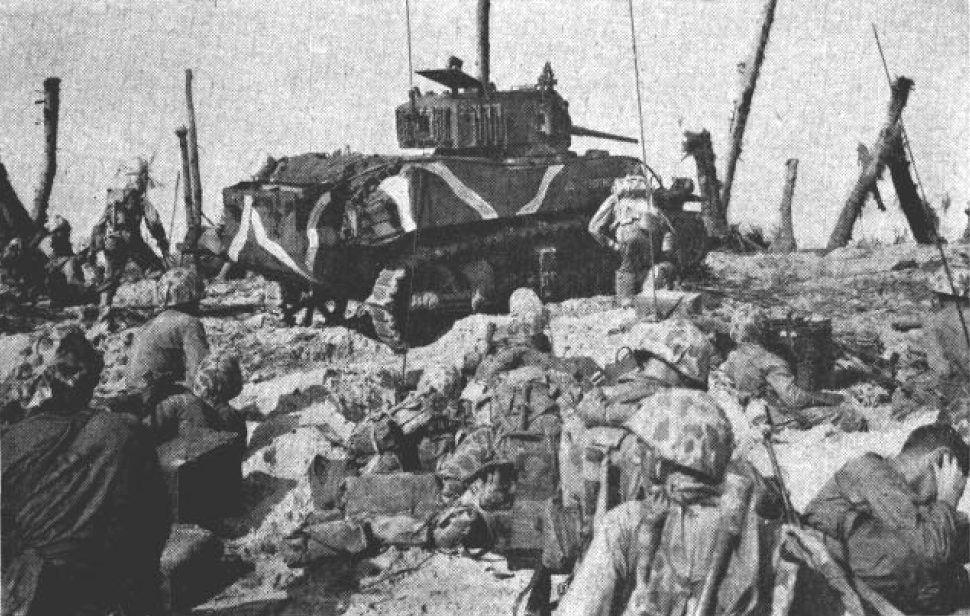
A Stuart tank of Company B, 4th Tank Battalion on Namur

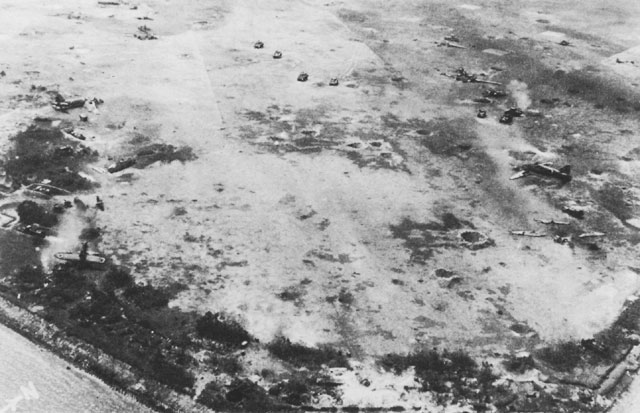
Marine tanks advance across the airfield on Roi, 1 Feb 1944

4th Marine Division
Major General Harry Schmidt (Note: Commanded V Amphibious Corps at Iwo Jima)

Asst. Div. Cmdr.: Brig. Gen. James L. Underhill
Chief of Staff: Col. William W. Rogers
Personnel officer (D-1): Col. Merton J. Batchelder
Intelligence officer (D-2): Maj. Gooderham L. McCormick
Operations officer (D-3): Col. Walter W. Wensinger
Logistics officer (-4): Col. William F. Brown

Nearby islands – D-Day
These landings were made first to provide artillery support for the units on Roi and Namur.

25th Marine Regiment
Colonel Samuel C. Cumming
Exec. Ofc.: Lt. Col. Walter I. Jordan
"Ivan" (Mellu), "Jacob" (Ennuebing)

1st Battalion (Lt. Col. Clarence J. O'Donnell)

"Allen" (Ennubirr)

2nd Battalion (Lt. Col. Lewis C. Hudson Jr.)

"Abraham" (Ennugarret), "Albert" (Ennumennet)

3rd Battalion (Lt. Col. Justice M. Chambers)

Roi (Red Beaches 2 & 3) – D+1

23rd Marine Regiment
Colonel Louis R. Jones
Exec. Ofc.: Lt. Col. John R. Lanigan

1st Battalion (Lt. Col. Hewin O. Hammond)
2nd Battalion (Lt. Col. Edward J. Dillon)

CMoH recipient: PFC Richard B. Anderson (KIA 1 Feb)

3rd Battalion (Lt. Col. John J. Cosgrove Jr)

Namur (Green Beaches 1 & 2) – D+1

24th Marine Regiment
Colonel Franklin A. Hart
Exec. Ofc.: Lt. Col. Homer L. Litzenberg Jr.

1st Battalion (Lt. Col. Aquilla J. Dyess (KIA 2 Feb — CMoH recipient), then Maj. Maynard C. Schultz)
2nd Battalion (Lt. Col. Francis H. Brink)
2nd Battalion (Lt. Col. Austin B. Brunelli)

CMoH recipients: 1st Lt. John V. Power (KIA 1 Feb), Pvt. Richard K. Sorenson

14th Marine Regiment (Artillery)
Colonel Louis G. DeHaven
Exec. Ofc.: Lt. Col. Randall M. Victory
These landings were made on D-Day to provide artillery support for the units on Roi and Namur.

"Allen" (Ennubirr)

1st Battalion (Lt. Col. Harry J. Zimmer)

"Albert" (Ennumennet)

2nd Battalion (Lt. Col. George B. Wilson Jr.)

"Jacob" (Ennuebing)

3rd Battalion (Lt. Col. Robert E. MacFarlane)

"Ivan" (Mellu)

4th Battalion (Maj. Carl A. Youngdale)

20th Marine Regiment (Engineer)
Colonel Lucian W. Burnham
Exec. Ofc.: Lt. Col. Nelson K. Brown

1st Battalion (Maj. Richard G. Ruby)
2nd Battalion (Lt. Col. Otto Lessing)
3rd Battalion (Note: 121st Naval Construction Battalion) (Lt. Cmdr. William O. Byrne)

Division troops

1st Armored Amphibian Battalion (Maj. Louis Metzger)
4th Amphibian Tractor Battalion (Lt. Col. Clovis C. Coffman)
10th Amphibian Tractor Battalion (Maj. Victor J. Croizat)
4th Tank Battalion (Maj. Richard K. Schmidt)
15th Defense Battalion (Lt. Col. Francis B. Loomis Jr.)

=== Army (Southern Kwajalein) ===
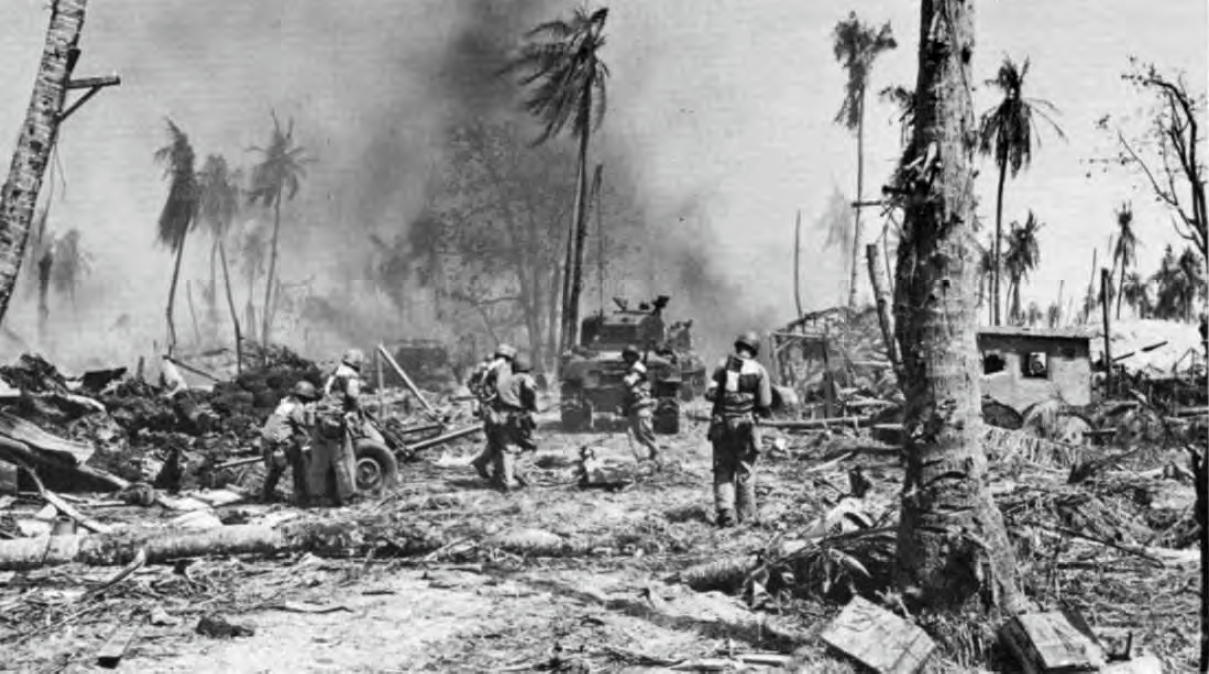
US infantry and M4 Sherman tanks attack amid the rubble of fortifications on Kwajalein Island 2 Feb 1944.

7th Infantry ("Bayonet") Division
Major General Charles H. Corlett (Note: Rose to corps command during the liberation of Europe)

Infantry

Kwajalein Isl., Left Sector (Red Beach 1) – D+2

184th Infantry Regiment

Kwajalein Isl., Right Sector (Red Beach 2) – D+2

32nd Infantry Regiment

Ebeye Island (Reserve regt.) – D+3

17th Infantry Regiment

Artillery

48th, 49th, 57th FA Battalions (105mm)
31st FA Battalion (155mm)

Division troops

7th Reconnaissance Troop (Mechanized)
13th Engineer Combat Battalion
7th Medical Battalion
7th Counterintelligence Corps Detachment

== Japanese forces ==
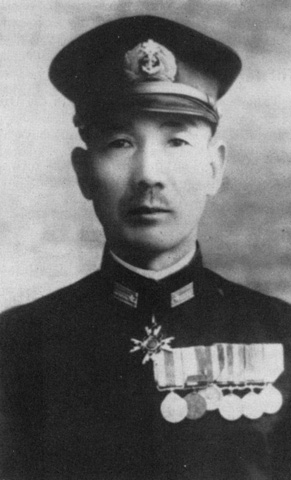
Rear Adm. Akiyama Monzō (KIA)

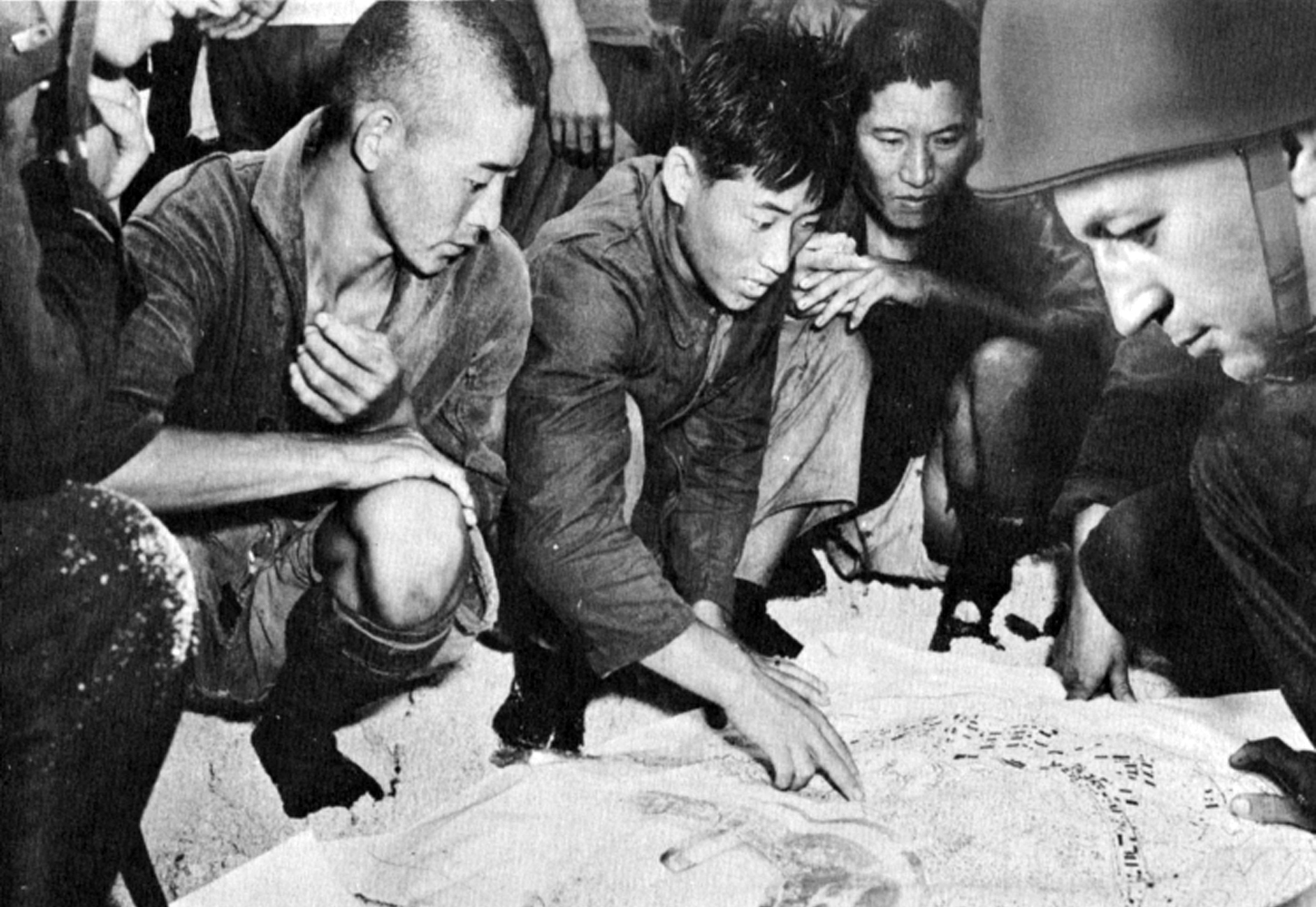
Korean laborers help GIs locate Japanese forces on Kwajalein Island

Fourth Fleet (Headquarters at Truk)
Vice Admiral Masami Kobayashi

On Roi-Namur
Approx. 4,100 IJN personnel, 933 IJA

61st Guard Force (det.)
4th Fleet Construction Unit (Note: impressed Korean laborers) (det.)
24th Air Flotilla HQ

Rear Admiral Michiyuki Yamada (KIA 28 Jan) (Note: killed on Namur during pre-invasion bombardment)

On Kwajalein Island
Approx. 3,000 IJN personnel

6th Base Force
6th Submarine Base Force

Rear Admiral Akiyama Monzō (KIA 2 Feb)

6th Communications Unit
Yokusuka 4th SNLF (one company)
3rd Mobile Bttn. / 1st Amphib. Brigade (one company)
952nd Air Unit

== Bibliography ==
- Clark, George C. (2006). The Six Marine Divisions in the Pacific: Every Campaign of World War II. Jefferson, North Carolina: McFarland & Company. ISBN 0-7864-2769-8.
- Rottman, Gordon L. (2004). The Marshall Islands 1944: Operation Flintlock, the capture of Kwajalein and Eniwetok. Oxford: Osprey Publishing Ltd. ISBN 978-1-84176-851-9.
- Stanton, Shelby L. (1984). World War II Order of Battle. New York: Galahad Books. ISBN 0-88365-775-9.
