= Battle of Al-Qa'im (2005) =

2005 battle of the Iraq War

Operation Matador (Iraq)
- Part of the Iraq War
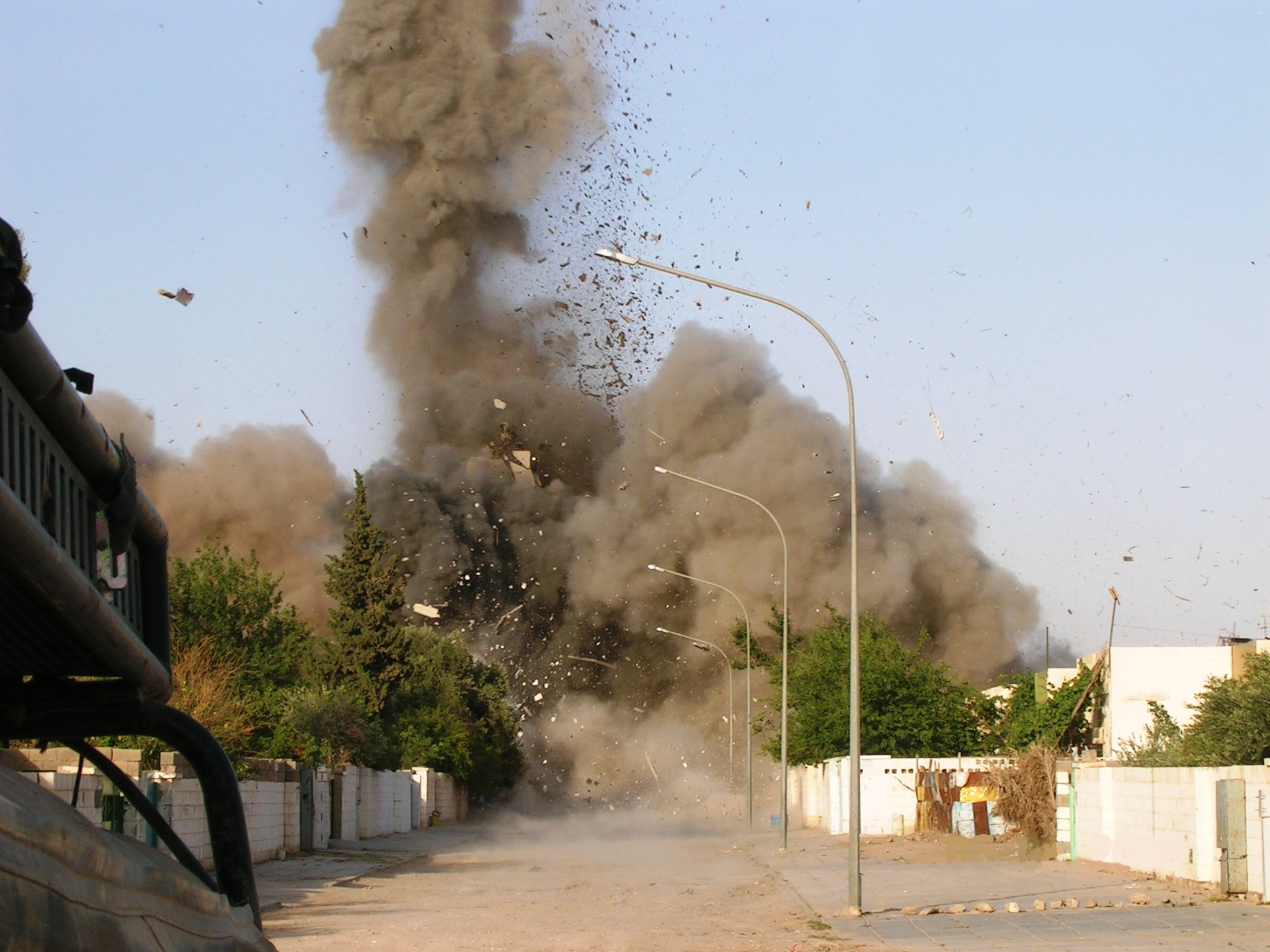
- A large weapons cache in New Ubaydi is destroyed
Date	8 May 2005 – 19 May 2005
Location	Ubaydi (near Al-Qa'im), Al-Anbar 34.2200°N 41.0539°E
Result	Inconclusive

Belligerents
United States	Al-Qaeda in Iraq Islamic Army in Iraq; Others

Commanders and leaders
(United States) Col. S.W. Davis	Sulaiman Khalid Darwaish

Strength
1,000 troops	Unknown

Casualties and losses
9 killed 40 wounded	Unknown

The Battle of Al-Qa'im (code-named Operation Matador) was a military offensive conducted by the United States Marine Corps, against insurgent positions in Iraq's northwestern Anbar province, which ran from 8 May 2005 to 19 May 2005. It was focused on eliminating insurgents and foreign fighters in a region known as a smuggling route and a sanctuary for foreign fighters.

== Details ==
In mid-May 2005, Task Force 3/2 and elements of Task Force 3/25 (3rd Battalion/2nd Marines, 3rd Battalion/25th Marines, 4th Assault Amphibian Bn, 2nd Light Armored Reconnaissance Bn Bravo Company, B Co 4th Combat Engineer Bn, 2nd Platoon A Co 1st Tank Bn, and a detachment of H-1's from HMLA 269) supported by the 163rd Ordnance, conducted a sweep of an insurgent-held area near the Syrian border. Combat Engineers from 4th CEB breached the river banks followed by 814th Engineer Company (MRB) who built a floating bridge while conducting concurrent rafting. It lasted eleven days, The Marines suffered 9 killed in action and 40 wounded in action. Notable among these casualties was a squad from 1st Platoon, Lima Company of the 3rd Battalion, 25th Marines, which had all of its members killed or wounded, mostly while embarked in an AAV that was struck by an IED.

Many of the insurgents encountered were not wearing uniforms, and in some cases were wearing protective vests. Furthermore, coalition officials noted that the training, tactics and organization displayed by the insurgents battled in the Syrian desert exceeded that which had been seen in other engagements further east, with only the exception of the former members of the Fedayeen (that comprised a large portion of insurgents fought by the Coalition in Operation Vigilant Resolve.) Thus it is plausible to believe that the Fedayeen made a large portion of the insurgents fought in Matador.

Additionally, the Marines in Matador did not have sufficient numbers to set up a permanent garrison in Al-Qa'im and the other insurgent held towns and withdrew as a result. Consequently, as soon as they left guerilla fighters were back in the towns and reestablished control over the town. Insurgents' continued presence in the Syrian desert meant that the Syrian border would remain a viable route for smuggling military equipment used by the insurgency. The engagement could loosely be described as a running battle, with the heaviest fighting taking place in urban environments located in Ubaydi, Arabi, and Al-Qa'im, all are cities in the insurgent dominated Al Anbar Governorate. It was followed by Operation Squeeze Play.

== See also ==
- 2005 in Iraq
- Occupation of Iraq (2003–2011)
- Iraqi insurgency
- Al Anbar Governorate
- Syrian Desert

== Notes ==
*Ellen Knickmeyer is the Baghdad bureau chief for the Washington Post and an embedded reporter in Iraq.
