= 4th Marine Division =

Ground combat element of the U.S. Marine Corps Forces Reserve

- 4th Marine Division insignia
- Active: August 16, 1943 – November 28, 1945; February 1966 – present
- Branch: United States Marine Corps
- Type: Ground combat element
- Size: Marine Division (Approximately 17,000)
- Part of: Marine Forces Reserve
- Garrison/HQ: New Orleans, Louisiana
- Nicknames: "Fighting Fourth" “Maui Marines”
- Engagements: World War II; Gilbert and Marshall Islands campaign; Battle of Kwajalein; Mariana and Palau Islands campaign; Battle of Saipan; Battle of Tinian; Volcano and Ryukyu Islands campaign; Battle of Iwo Jima; Gulf War; Operation Desert Storm; War on Terror; Afghanistan; Iraq

Commanders
- Current commander: Brigadier General John K. Jarrard
- Command Senior Enlisted Leader: Sergeant Major Garett G. Kirkby
- Division Gunner: Marine Gunner (CWO-5) John Lucero

The 4th Marine Division is a reserve division in the United States Marine Corps. It was raised in 1943 for service during World War II, and subsequently fought in the Pacific against the Japanese. Deactivated after the war, the division was re-formed in 1966 and elements of the division deployed during the Gulf War in 1990–1991, as well as during the Iraq War. It is currently the ground combat element of the Marine Forces Reserve and is headquartered in New Orleans, Louisiana, and has units throughout the United States.

The division is tasked to provide trained combat and combat support personnel and units to augment and reinforce the active component in time of war, national emergency, and at other times. It is also tasked to be able to reconstitute the division, if required.

== History ==
=== World War II ===
4th Marine Division Battle of Iwo Jima order of battle (click to enlarge)

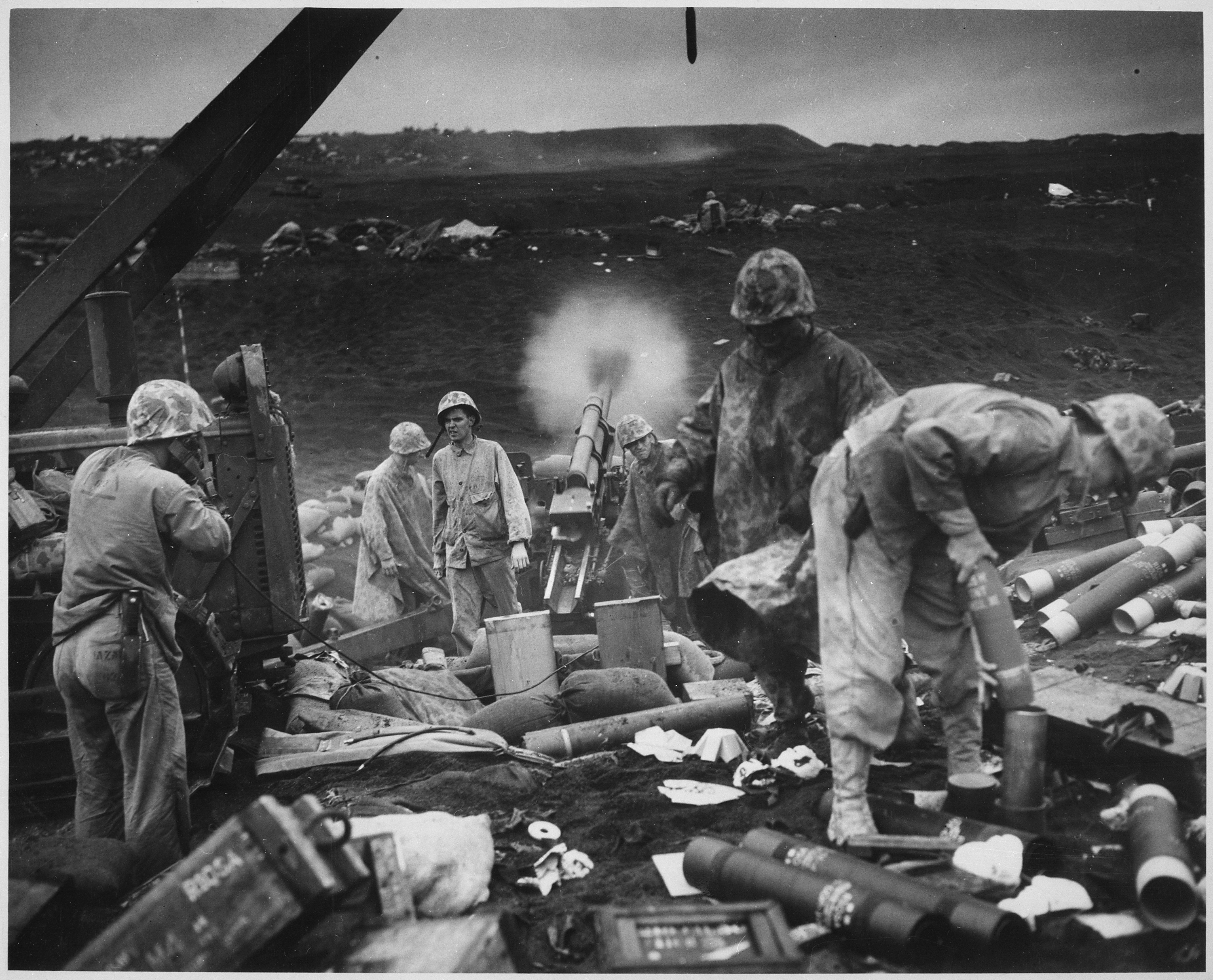
Across the litter on Iwo Jima's black sands, Marines of the 4th Division shell Japanese positions, 1945

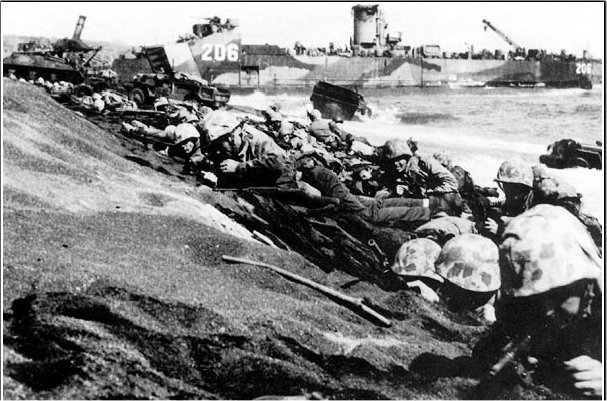
LSM 206 with 23rd Marines Shore Party. LSM 206 was loaded with A Co 133 Naval Construction Battalion's Shore Party equipment & 3 D8s at approx. 0935

This division was formed by the organization and redesignation of several other units. The 23rd Marine Regiment began as infantry detached from the 3rd Marine Division in February 1943, the same month that an artillery battalion of the 12th Marines became the genesis of the 14th Marines and engineer elements of the 19th Marines formed the nucleus of the 20th Marines. In March, the 24th Marine Regiment was organized, and then in May it was split in two to supply the men for the 25th Marines.

This war-time shuffling provided the major building blocks for a new division. The units were originally separated, however, with the 24th Marines and a variety of reinforcing units (engineer, artillery, medical, motor transport, special weapons, tanks, etc.) at Camp Pendleton in California. The rest of the units were at Camp Lejeune, North Carolina. This East Coast echelon moved to Pendleton by train and transit of the Panama Canal in July and August. When all the units were finally together, the 4th Marine Division was formally activated on August 16, 1943, with Major General Harry Schmidt in command.

After intensive training, it shipped out on 13 January 1944, and in 13 months made four major amphibious assaults, in the battles of Kwajalein (Roi-Namur), Saipan, Tinian and Iwo Jima under command of V Amphibious Corps, under its command and control were the first Joint Assault Signal Company, suffering more than 17,000 casualties. It was awarded two Presidential Unit Citations and a Navy Unit Commendation, and then inactivated 28 November 1945.

The division patch worn on Saipan had a gold "4" on a scarlet background, the official colors of the U.S. Marine Corps. The emblem was designed by SSgt John Fabion, a member of the division's Public Affairs Office before the Marshalls Campaign. His commanding officer was astonished to find that when the division attacked Roi Islet in Kwajelein Atoll in the Marshall Islands (January 1944), the layout of the runways on the airstrip there were an exact replica of the "4". The 4th had two Seabee Battalions posted to it during the war. The 121st Naval Construction Battalion was posted to the 20th Marines and redesignated as the 3rd Battalion of the Regiment. They landed with the 4th on Roi-Namur, Saipan and Tinian and received a Presidential Unit Citation for it. The 20th was deactivated and the 121st stayed on Tinian to work on the airfields when the 4th moved on. They were replaced by the 133rd NCB for the assault on Iwo Jima. The 133rd was posted to the 23rd Marines as their shore party until relieved on D plus 18.

WWII 4th Marines were honored in a flag ceremony in May 1945 by the US Army Air Force 73rd Bomb Wing Flagship staff with the newsreel press recording the ceremony and the crew of B-29 Number 49 Z-square standing at attention in attendance. This plane, the Flagship 500, was dedicated to the 4th Marines with their logo painted on the right side of the big bomber to honor the 4th Marines heroic efforts in the battles on Saipan, Tinian, Iwo Jima and Roi-Namur. A photo of this ceremony is published in "Big Bombers of WWII" by William N. Hess, etal.(c) 1998 on pgs 356 and 398.

==== Division commanders ====
- Brigadier General James L. Underhill (August 16, 1943 – 18 August 1943)
- Major General Harry Schmidt (18 August 1943 – 11 July 1944)
- Major General Clifton B. Cates (12 July 1944 – November 1945)

==== Assistant division commanders ====
- Brigadier General James L. Underhill (18 August 1943 – 10 April 1944)
- Brigadier General Samuel C. Cumming (11 April 1944 – 29 August 1944)
- Brigadier General Franklin A. Hart (30 August 1944 – September 1945)

==== Chiefs of Staff ====
- Colonel William W. Rogers (14 August 1943 – 10 August 1944)
- Colonel Matthew C. Horner (21 August 1944 – 29 August 1944)
- Brigadier General Franklin A. Hart (30 August 1944 – 31 October 1944) (Served simultaneously as Assistant Division Commander)
- Colonel Merton J. Batchelder (1 November 1944 – 9 April 1945)
- Colonel Walter W. Wensinger (10 April 1945 – 16 April 1945)
- Colonel Edwin A. Pollock (17 April 1945 – 28 November 1945)

=== Reactivation ===
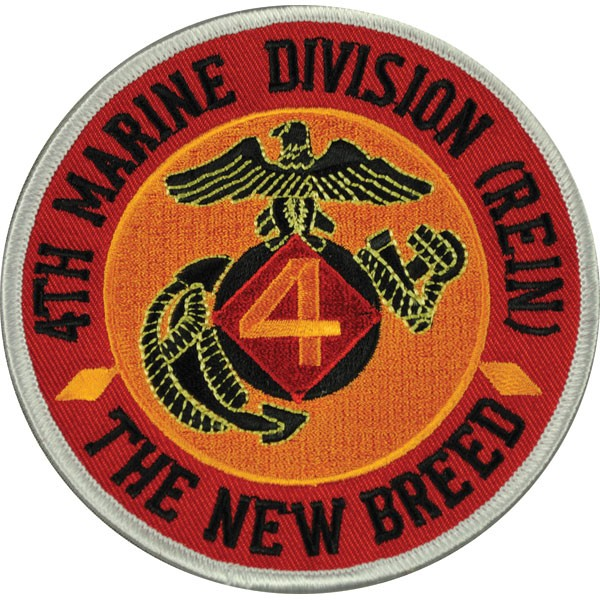
Post-1966 4th Marine Division Patch

In February 1966, it was reactivated as the only division in the Marine Forces Reserve.

Background: Early in 1962, Secretary of Defense Robert S. McNamara indicated to the Congress that he wanted the Marine Corps to have a fourth division/wing team, to be formed of Ready Reserves. In April of that year, the Commandant of the Marine Corps announced a major reorganization of the Marine Corps Reserve to be effective 1 July 1962. In this reorganization, 53 reserve units were redesignated as 4th Marine Division units. While 1 July 1962 is regarded as the date of reactivation of the division, it was not until 14 February 1966 that the 4th Marine Division headquarters nucleus was actually activated at Camp Pendleton. The division was given the primary mission "to establish an effective staff nucleus capable of directing, controlling and integrating, as directed, the mobilization planning and logistics functions preceding the activation of the 4th Marine Division and of ensuring an orderly and efficient mobilization of the division." Major General Robert E. Cushman Jr., commanding general of Camp Pendleton was given the additional responsibility as the commanding general of the division.

On 23 June 1966, the World War II division colors were presented to General Cushman, at a 4th Marine Division Association meeting at Camp Pendleton, California. Reminiscent of a passed torch, a new generation of Marines was willing to prove itself worthy of the trust attendant in the acceptance of the colors.

Even before the headquarters nucleus had been formed, still other changes were on the drawing board. In late 1965, the Commandant approved a plan to further reorganize the Organized Marine Corps Reserve so that the division/wing team would become a "mirror image" of its regular counterparts. The first step toward achieving this goal was to reorganize the 4th Marine Aircraft Wing so that it would reflect an active wing. Other steps that were required to accomplish the Commandant's directive were: establish division combat and combat support units together with certain force troops units; form the 4th Force Service Regiment (completed in June 1968); and form FMF augmentation units. To complete the reorganization, active duty colonels were assigned as commanders of the reserve regiments, reserve brigadier generals were assigned as assistant division commanders, and an active duty general officer was assigned as a full-time division commander. All of these changes were made by 15 July 1970 when Brigadier General Leo J. Dulacki arrived to take command of the division. One month later, General Dulacki was promoted to major general. The "nucleus" designation was dropped with the command unit now being designated as Headquarters, 4th Marine Division.

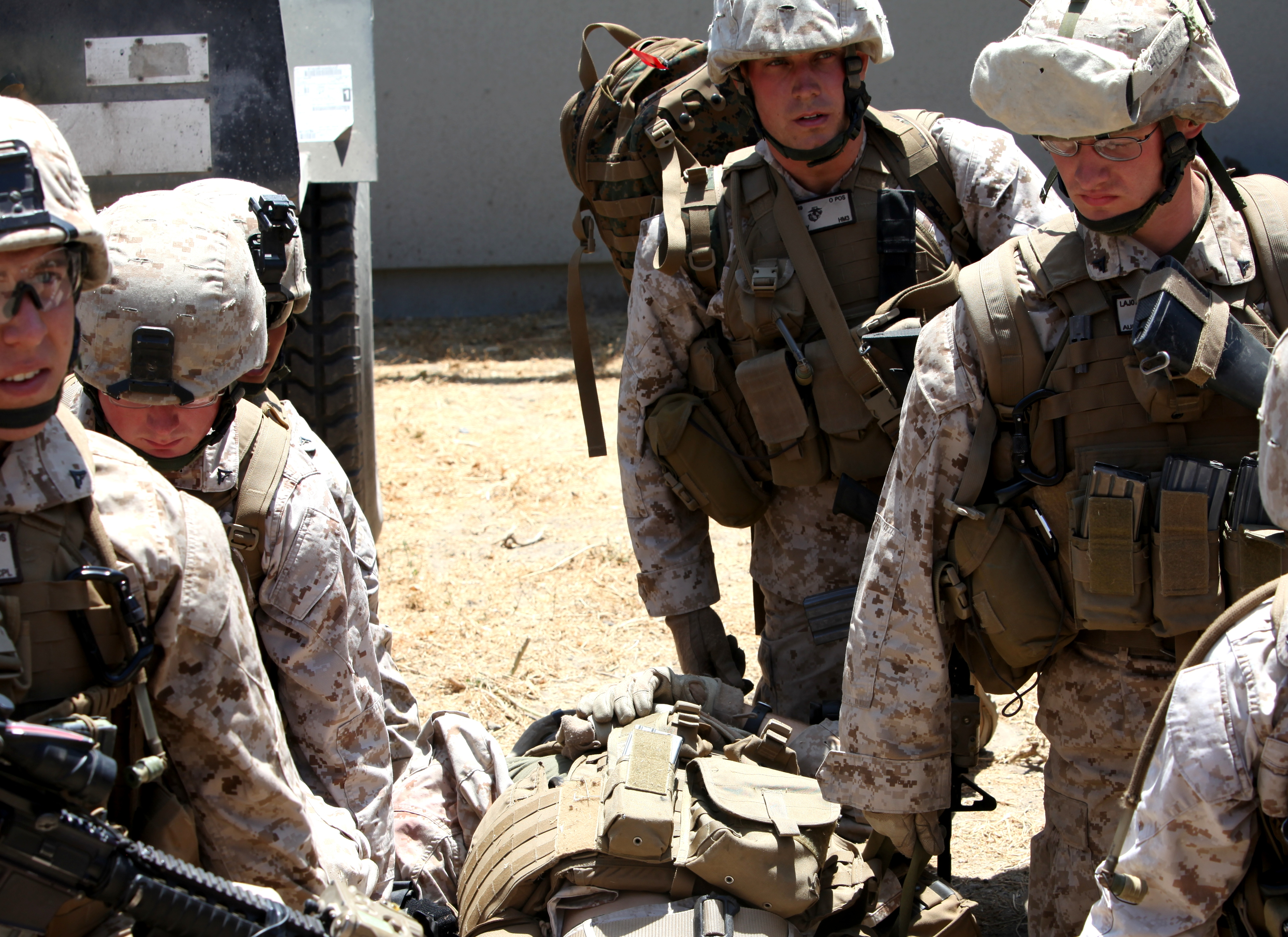
Marines of the 4th Division prepare to move a simulated casualty to a helicopter at Camp Pendleton

With the division's new structure came a new mission. The division was now responsible for training all Organized Marine Corps Reserve ground units. The Commandant's intent of 1965 had been accomplished and the Marine Corps had one more division/wing team. The new change antedated by three years the "Total Force Concept," the Department of Defense policy of integrating reserve component units into the wartime planning and programming process.

The 4th Marine Division was now a fully structured force in its own right, able to muster and move out to a combat assignment within a relatively short period of time. In still another change, effective 17 May 1976, the 4th Division Support Group was formed, providing the division with selective combat service support which includes combat engineers, tactical motor transport, and an assault shore party. In a move external to the division, certain battalions were added to the 4th Force Service Regiment, now redesignated as the 4th Force Service Support Group.

The ultimate goal of Marine divisions is readiness, but the 4th Marine Division has one problem not shared with the regular divisions. An unusual span of control situation is brought about by the geographic dispersion of some 200 division units throughout the United States. The training accomplishments of the 4th Marine Division have been both varied in content and in operation.

The 4th Marine Division has one purpose and that was clearly expressed by Major General Edward J. Miller in his 1976 Armed Forces Day message, "The 4th Marine Division stands ready to carry out any mission assigned as the Marine Corps' Force in Readiness." Created for battle in 1943, the division's ultimate purpose remains the same.

=== Gulf War ===
Between November 1990 and January 1991, Bravo Company, 4th Tank Battalion, 4th Marine Division was mobilized in support of Operation Desert Shield and Operation Desert Storm. Elements of the battalion were "in country" and combat ready within 32 days of activation. During the fighting, Bravo Company engaged Iraqi tanks in combat on February 25, reporting 34 enemy tanks destroyed or disabled in less than 90 seconds. This battle was named the "Reveille Engagement" and went on to be the biggest and fastest tank battle in United States Marine Corps history. They were the only Marine unit equipped with M1A1 Abrams tanks. Bravo Company went on to destroy 59 tanks, 32 APCs, 26 non armored vehicles, and an artillery gun. Bravo Company destroyed a total of 119 enemy vehicles and took over 800 POWs. The crew of the tank "Stepchild" has the longest confirmed live kill (Iraqi BMP) by a tank at 3,750 meters (2.33 miles).

In November 1990, Battery H, commanded by Capt. Paul W. Brier, and Battery I were two of four reserve artillery batteries mobilized to augment active component formations during the Gulf War. They deployed to Camp Lejeune, North Carolina, in December, and subsequently deployed to Saudi Arabia in January 1991. Battery H was attached to 1st Battalion, 11th Marines, 1st Marine Division, and Battery I to 10th Marine, 2d Marine Division, becoming parts of Task Force Papa Bear and Task Force Ripper, respectively, for the ground assault on 24 February through two obstacle belts and subsequent operations to liberate Kuwait from Iraqi forces. These active component augmentations were necessary as both of these artillery regiments were lacking one of their organic direct support artillery batteries, as they each had a battery attached to embarked and deployed Marine Expeditionary Units.

On 25 February, Battery H engaged, with direct howitzer fire, and destroyed an Iraqi mobility rocket launching system at a range of 800m, which was subsequently found to be in the center of an Iraqi brigade of D20 152mm howitzers. Battery H had just occupied an exposed firing position, having received multiple shelling which significantly wounded one cannoneer, Sgt. Chris LaCivita. The 8-gun battery's 1000m by 700m position was on the far side of the second obstacle belt, well in front of the tank and infantry maneuver units it supported, with the burning Burqan oil field to its immediate east. This positioning far forward of the forward line of troops was selected to support the 1st Marine Division's northward momentum and Task Force Papa Bear's continued and rapid assault into Kuwait City.

The battery was laid on an azimuth of fire to the north, when it received a battalion mass fire mission on a target 30 km to its south. Unknown the battery's Marines, an Iraqi Brigade was launching a counterattack through the burning oil field on 1st Marine Division Command Post. On battery's east flank piece (Gun #1) Gunner Sgt Shawn Toney and Section Chief Sergeant Thomas Stark, IV, spotted two enemy multiple rocket launchers as they were shifted trails to fire to the south. They engaged and destroyed launchers with heavy automatic weapons and direct fire from their M198 155mm howitzer, while the rest of the battery continued to support the fire mission to the south and defend the battery position from ground assault.

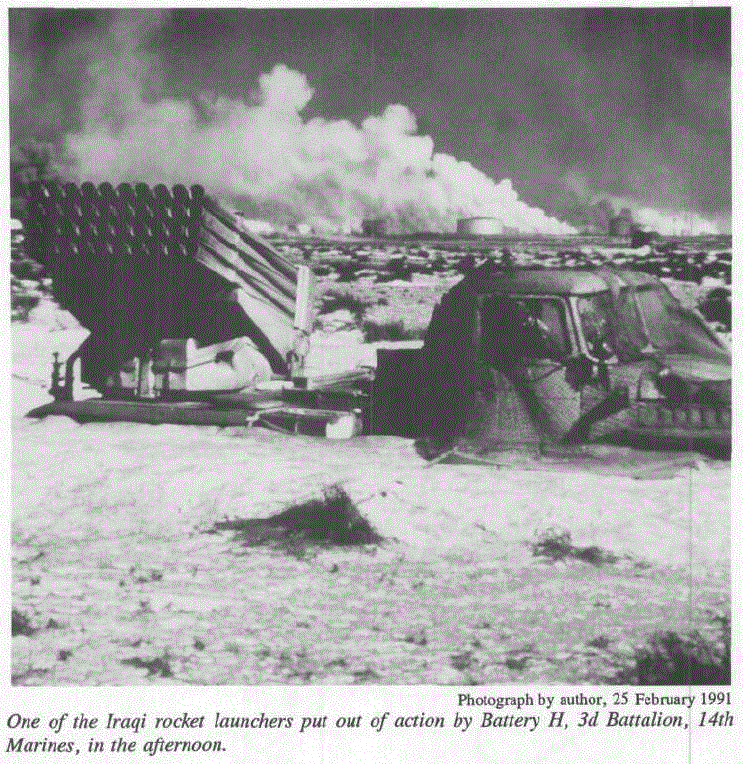
One of the Iraqi rocket launchers destroyed by Battery H, 3rd Battalion, 14th Marines, at the al Burqan Oil Field, Kuwait, 25 February 1991.

LtCol. Jay Sollis, 1/11 Commander, arrived in the battery position, requested air support and directed a section of AH-1W Sea Cobra to engage the Iraqi counterattack force in the oil field.

On the night of 25 February, the Battalion CP occupied a new position in support of Task Force Papa Bear. A security patrol, which included Lance Corporal Troy L. Gregory of Battery H, was organized to investigate an enemy bunker adjacent to the new CP position. While conducting this patrol, Gregory stepped on an Iraqi land mine and was critically wounded. Despite quick evacuation to a Naval Hospital, he died the following day of his wounded, just a few days before his 21st birthday. He was posthumously awarded the Purple Heart Medal and Combat Action Ribbon and was laid to rest at Arlington National Cemetery in section 60, Grave 7723. The Navy-Marine Corps Reserve Center in Richmond was renamed in his honor.

Battery H's final position was just south of the Kuwait International Airport when the ceasefire was announced. The Battery subsequently retrograded to the 1st Marine Division Support Area in Saudi Arabia. In April, the battery redeployed to the United States and was released from active duty.

Additionally, on 18 November 1990, Alpha Company, 4th Tank Battalion, 4th Marine Division was mobilized in support of Operation Desert Shield and Operation Desert Storm. Alpha Company was assigned to Regimental Landing Team 5, 3rd Battalion, 5th Marine Regiment, 1st Marine Division. This was part of the amphibious force in the Persian Gulf. Alpha Company was loaded onto the USS Tarawa (LHA-1) and the USS Mount Vernon (LSD-39) with the 5th Marine Expeditionary Brigade off of Camp Pendleton, CA on 1 December 1990. Elements of Alpha Company participated in the Al Waffra operation, clearing a large Iraqi mine field with tanks equipped with a mine plow. The 5th MEB was part of Operation Desert Calm and later participated in Operation Sea Angel in a humanitarian mission of relief of the 1991 Bangladesh cyclone. Alpha Company returned to Camp Pendleton, CA and was deactivated on 31 July 1991.

24th Marine Regimental Command was activated November 17, 1990, and departed for Camp Pendleton with a TOWII Platoon assigned to 1st MEF with the Nuclear, Chemical & Biological Warfar Platoon; The rest of the regimental command consisting of snipers, motor transport, supply and administration with the bulk of the personnel being in communications platoon under Colonel George German. After 30 days at Camp Pendleton, the regiment embarked from March AFB to Port Jubail, Saudi Arabia, to relieve the 4th Marines in the port and provided port security with individuals tasked for duties with 1 MEF and 1st FSSG. The regiment fell under Scud missile attack on January 19 and 20 while the USS Tarawa was in port. The regiment returned to Kansas City in May 1991.

=== Global war on terror ===
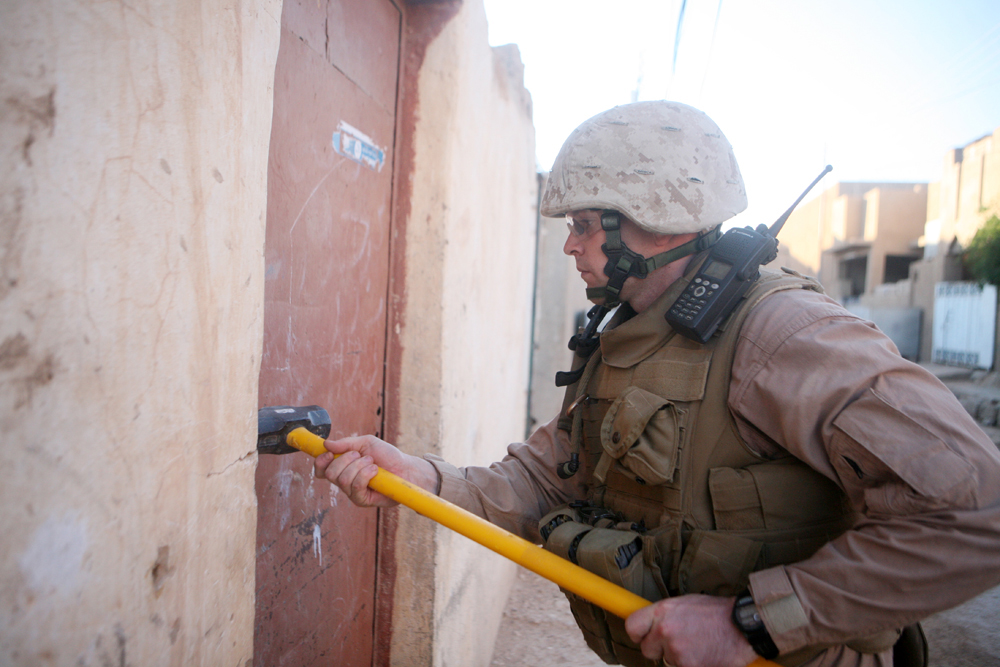
A Marine with Battery M, 3/14 hammers a door during a cache search in Rutbah, Iraq.

==== Operation Iraqi Freedom ====
In 2004, Mike Battery, out of Chattanooga, Tennessee, deployed to Fallujah, Iraq and took part in Operation Phantom Fury to re-take the insurgent-held city.

They later deployed again in 2007 in support of Operation Iraqi Freedom. During this second deployment, they were attached to 2nd Light Armored Reconnaissance Battalion, Regimental Combat Team 5 and operated in the vicinity of Ar Rutbah under the callsign, "Excalibur". In 2007, the unit suffered one casualty Cpl Dustin J. Lee.

On January 4, 2005, 3rd Battalion, 25th Marines was activated. From January 10 to late February 2005, the companies conducted pre-deployment training at Marine Corps Air Ground Combat Center Twentynine Palms and March Air Reserve Base, California. The battalion was in Iraq by the first week of March 2005, tasked with training the Iraqi Security Forces (ISF) and conducting stability and security operations to prevent insurgents from gaining a foothold in and around the cities of Iraq's Al Anbar province.

Major operations that the battalion participated in during its deployment included Operations Matador, New Market, Spear, Sword, River Bridge, Outer Banks, and Quick Strike. The battalion rotated out of Iraq in late September 2005, and deactivated on January 3, 2006. Forty-six Marines and two Navy Corpsmen serving with the battalion in Iraq were killed in action. A memorial paying tribute to them was erected at the battalion headquarters in Brook Park, Ohio, and was dedicated on November 12, 2005.

In January 2003 the 4th Combat Engineer Battalion activated and deployed personnel in support of Operation Iraqi Freedom. December 2004 activated and deployed personnel to serve as members of the 5th Civil Affairs Group and continue to support Operation Iraqi Freedom and Operation Enduring Freedom. 8 members of the battalion were killed supporting operations in Iraq.

==== Operation Enduring Freedom ====
In August 2010, 3/25 deployed to Afghanistan in support of Operation Enduring Freedom. The battalion's missions were across Helmand province and included reconnaissance, civil affairs, security and combat operations. The battalion rotated out of Afghanistan in March 2011, and was deactivated in June 2011. One Marine serving in the battalion was killed in action during the deployment. Lance Corporal Aaron M. Swanson, 21, died Monday February 7, 2011, in Garmsir District, Helmand Province, Afghanistan

==== Chattanooga shootings ====
On July 16, 2015, four Marines with Mike Battery's Inspector-Instructor staff were killed by a gunman who was embarking on a shooting spree targeting military installations. In addition, a sailor died from his wounds two days later.

Some of the 3/14 Marines killed in action were reportedly killed while returning fire at the gunman, providing cover for a larger group of potential victims who were escaping over a fence.

== Structure ==
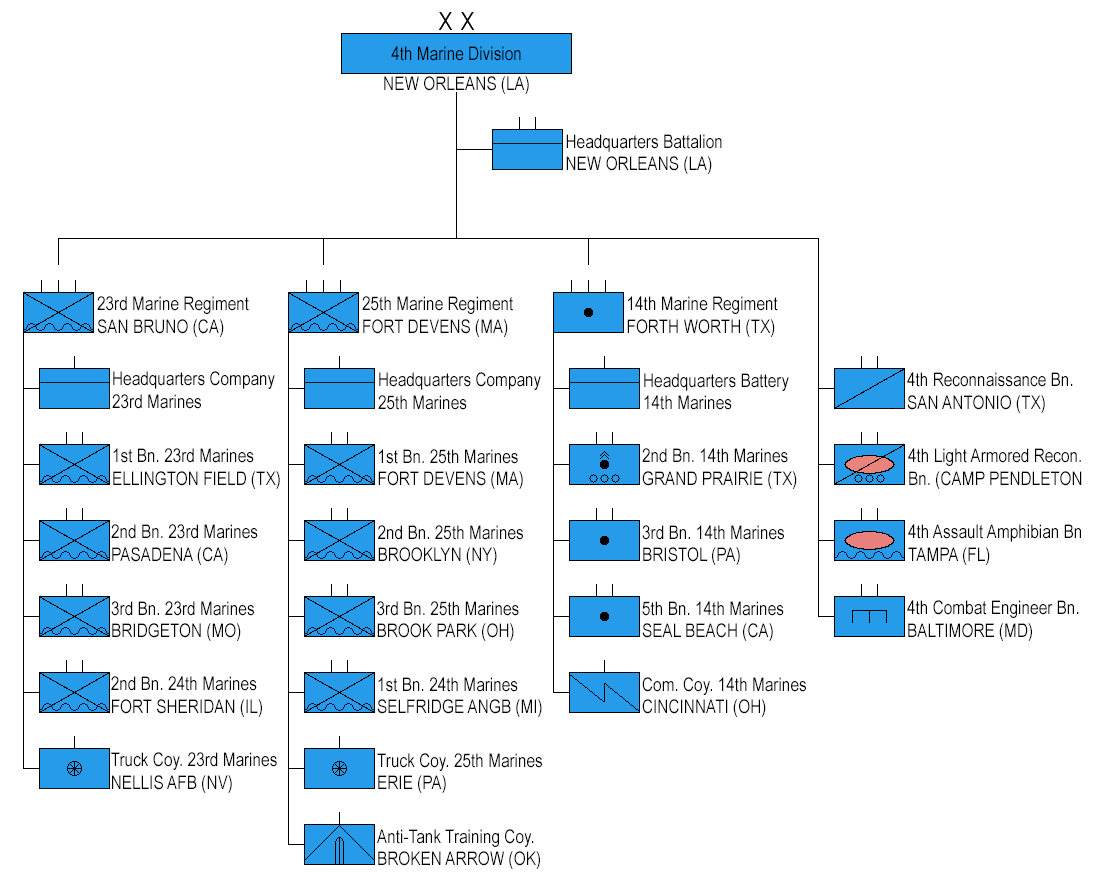
4th Marine Division organization as of May 2026 (click to enlarge)

- 14th Marine Regiment
- 23rd Marine Regiment
- 25th Marine Regiment
- 4th Assault Amphibian Battalion
- 4th Combat Engineer Battalion
- 4th Light Armored Reconnaissance Battalion
- 4th Reconnaissance Battalion

The division's 24th Marine Regiment was deactivated in 2013.

== Unit awards ==
A unit citation or commendation is an award bestowed upon an organization for the action cited. Members of the unit who participated in said actions are allowed to wear on their uniforms the awarded unit citation. Awards and decorations of the United States Armed Forces have different categories: i.e. Service, Campaign, Unit, and Valor. Unit Citations are distinct from personal awards. The 4th Marine Division has been presented with the following awards:

Presidential Unit Citation with two bronze stars (World War II) (I MEF Iraq 2003)
Navy Unit Commendation with three bronze stars (World War II, Desert Storm, I MEF Iraq 2004, II MEF Iraq 2007)
Asiatic-Pacific Campaign Medal with four bronze stars
World War II Victory Medal
National Defense Service Medal with two bronze stars (Desert Storm, War on Terror)
Armed Forces Expeditionary Medal (Desert Storm)
Southwest Asia Service Medal with two Bronze Stars (Desert Shield, Desert Storm)
Iraq Campaign Medal with three Bronze Stars (2003–2008)
Global War on Terrorism Expeditionary Medal (Iraq 2003)
Global War on Terrorism Service Medal
Kuwait Liberation (Saudi Arabia)
Kuwait Liberation (Kuwait)

== Medal of Honor recipients ==
=== World War II ===
- Sergeant Darrell S. Cole
- Sergeant Ross F. Gray
- Chief Warrant Officer 4 Hershel W. Williams
- Captain Joseph J. McCarthy
- Gunnery Sergeant Robert H. McCard
- Private Richard K. Sorenson
- Lieutenant Colonel Justice M. Chambers
- First Lieutenant John V. Power
- Private Joseph W. Ozbourn

== See also ==
- List of United States Marine Corps divisions
- Organization of the United States Marine Corps
- 23rd Marine Regiment
- 25th Marine Regiment
- 20th Marine Regiment (121st Naval Construction Battalion)
- Naval Mobile Construction Battalion 133 (23rd Marine Regiment)
