= Operation Squeeze Play =

2005 military operation in the Iraq War

- Part of the Post-invasion Iraq
Date	22 May 2005
Location	Eastern Baghdad, Iraq
Result	Almost 300 suspects detained in the first day

Belligerents
United States (Iraq) New Iraqi Army	Iraqi Insurgents

After the handover of sovereignty, Operation Squeeze Play was a combined U.S./Iraqi sweep of the eastern suburbs of Baghdad launched on 22 May 2005. Almost 300 suspects were detained in the first day of the operation.

It followed Operation Matador, and preceded Operation New Market.

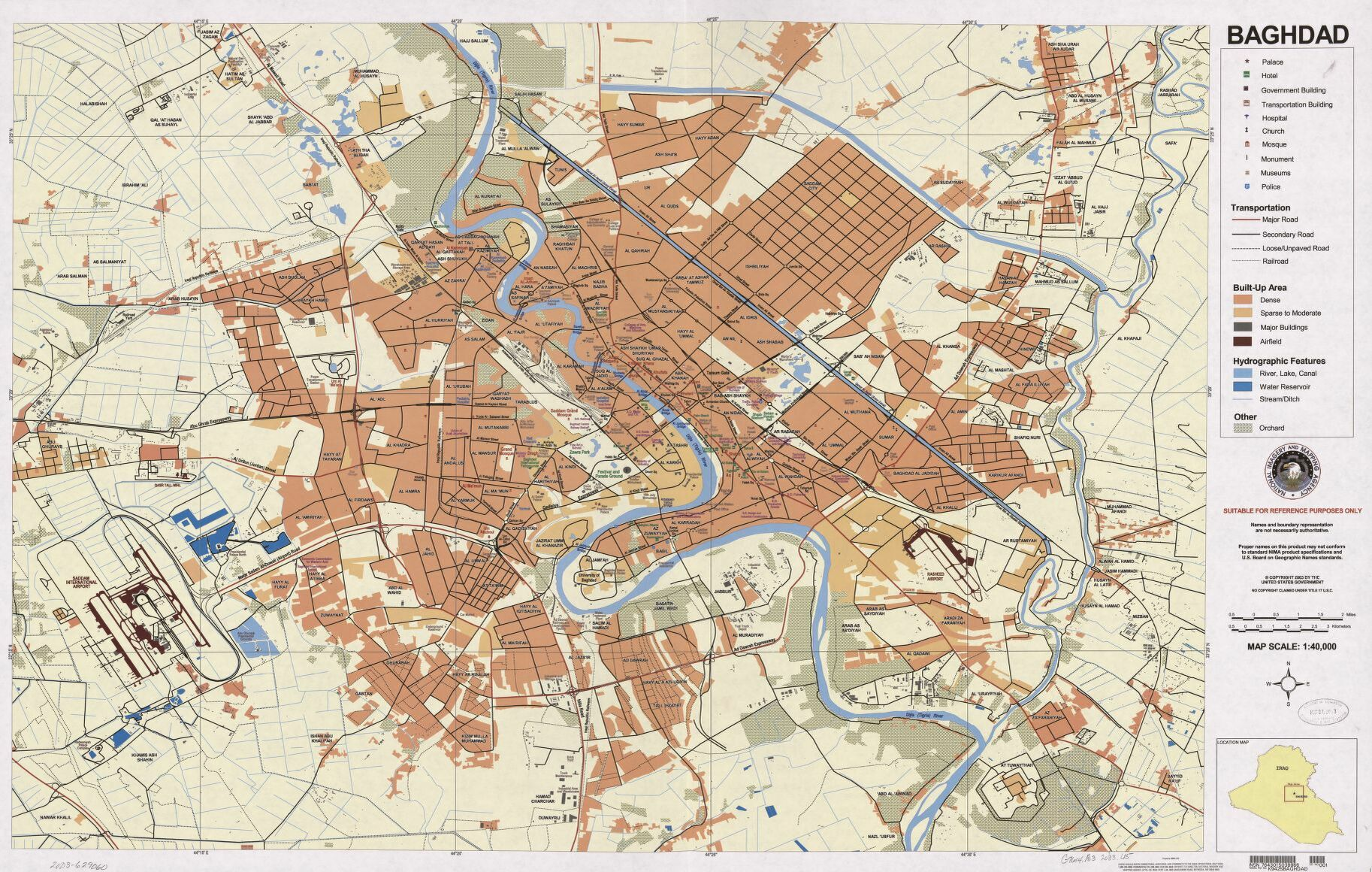
Map of Baghdad

== Context ==
The United States led a coalition force into Iraq to overthrow the Saddam Hussein government. This was the beginning of the Iraq War. The war was meant to stop terrorism from spreading out of Iraq after the September 11, 2001 attacks. The United States was joined by the United Kingdom and many other coalition forces in the invasion of Iraq. The beginning of the invasion led to many different operations throughout the Iraq War, the most famous being Operation Red Dawn which led to the capture of Saddam Hussein. Saddam Hussein being captured led to various groups and governments trying to take power of Iraq leading to sectarian violence. Throughout the many stages of the Iraq war Operation Squeeze Play was a minor operation but portrayed a new hope to the coalition force. This coalition force was seen as the beginning of a new era to military officials because of the cooperation of the parties that ultimately led to success.

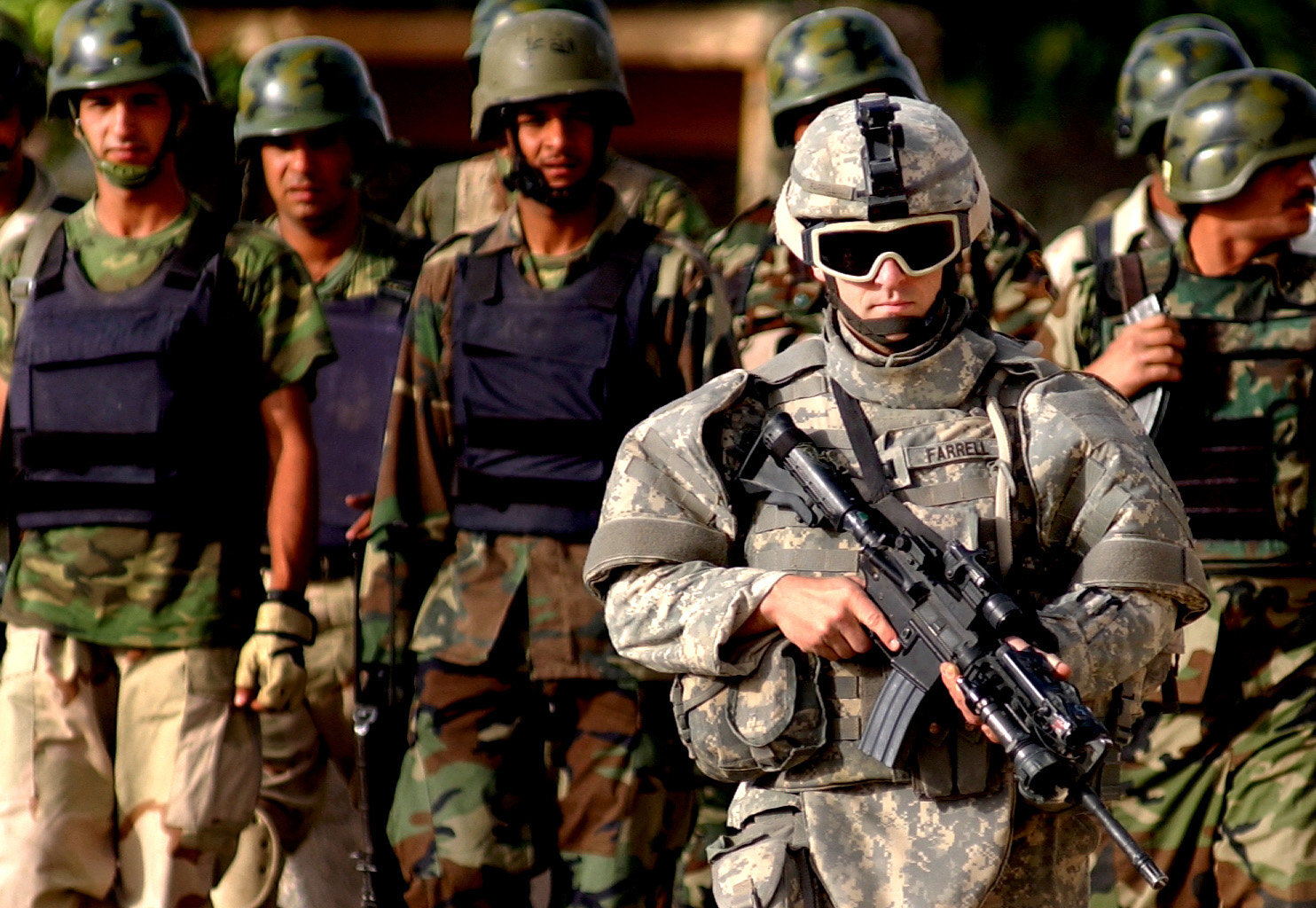
Iraqi police force being trained by American military

== Overview ==
The goal of this operation was to raid areas in eastern Baghdad and detain anybody linked to terrorism in hopes of fighting terror in the capital of Iraq. The raids began on 22 May 2005 and led to about 400 detainees in a span of 48 hours. The coalition task force was going house to house in the eastern Baghdad areas clearing blocks in hopes of finding suspected terrorists or anybody with useful information on known terrorists in the city. The residents of the war-ravaged city accepted the military forces well and even provided information about known terrorists that were spotted in the city. These specific cities were of interest to the coalition military because of the constant use of homemade roadside explosives that were common in this area of Iraq and the geographic location of the city. The cities were used as a harboring spot for both Ba'ath Party terrorists and the Zarqawi terrorist network between Baghdad and Fallujah. Along with over 400 suspected links to terror detained there were also 6 American lives lost during the operation.

== The Role of the United States ==
The United States led the coalition force into Iraq. Specifically in Operation Squeeze Play, the units that were involved in this operation were two battalions from the 3rd Brigade, 6th Iraqi Army Division along with two battalions from the 1st Brigade, 1st Iraqi Intervention Force. Not only did the United States provide these units they also provided three battalions from the 2nd Brigade Special Police Commandos and Soldiers from Task Force 2–14, 2nd Brigade Combat Team, 10th Mountain Division. The United States alone provided more than 900 troops to this operation; these consisted of soldiers, marines, pilots, and sailors. These 900 Americans were tasked with regaining ground in Iraq to prevent the spread of terrorism. American officials believed that if they withdrew troops from Eastern Baghdad after the operation that the city would fall to terrorism immediately. After the clearance of the city, Americans began training the Iraqi military and police force in hopes that they will be strong enough to fight off insurgents if they tried retaking that portion of Baghdad. With these efforts, military officials began telling residents of the city the true hopes of the insurgents; the insurgents only want the city to continue their terroristic attacks.

== The Role of the Iraqi Forces ==
Iraqi forces and the American military worked together during this operation to see the detaining of 400 suspects in what was a productive 48 hours for the coalition forces. Together both forces brought useful information to the table and working together ultimately led them closer to their goal, which was clearing out terror suspects around the Baghdad suburbs. The American military brought over 900 troops and useful technology as well as their massive arsenal. The Iraqi forces were useful in the long term planning of this operation. With the Iraqi military and police force joining the Americans they were able to learn from the Americans techniques on how to establish a stronghold in hopes they would be able to keep terror suspects out of their cities after the United States withdraws their forces. They also provided information on the region but most importantly they provided information on how to detect roadside explosives which were extremely common in Baghdadi cities and offered one of the biggest threats to Americans.
