= Operation New Market =

2005 military operation in Iraq

- Part of Iraq War
- Map of Haditha Iraq showing USMC maneuver elements.
Date	24–30 May 2005
Location	Near Haditha in western Iraq

Belligerents
United States; New Iraqi Army	Iraqi insurgents

Commanders and leaders
LtCol Lionel B. Urquhart	

Casualties and losses
2 killed 9 wounded	11 killed 31 detained

After the handover of sovereignty, Operation New Market was a sweep of an area near Haditha in western Iraq conducted by one thousand coalition and Iraqi Security Forces to rid the Euphrates river bank of anti-coalition forces. It was launched on 24 May 2005 and followed Operation Squeeze Play. New Market was followed by Operation Lightning. The operation was named after the famous US Civil War battle at New Market, VA where cadets from the Virginia Military Institute fought and some perished.

== Operation ==
Operation New Market was conducted by the 3d Battalion, 25th Marines while attached to Regimental Combat Team 2. RCT-2 was headquartered in Al Asad. 3/25 was headquartered in the Haditha Dam. The City of Haditha is about 10 miles south of the dam.

Company L approached from the west via amphibious tractors while Company K did a helo insert on the east side of the Euphrates River. Weapons Company screened to the east and west while 1st and 2nd Platoons, Company A, 1st Tank Battalion screened to the north and south of the city.

Lima swept eastward into the city and then to the north while Kilo crossed the Euphrates, cleared the island, and then continued across the Euphrates into Haditha City and then south.

Battalion headquarters was located at a technical school on the west side of the city.

By 29 May, the operation had killed 11 insurgents and 31 detained, over 300 HE 82mm mortar rounds were seized and destroyed, as were several other smaller ordinance caches. despite the success of the operation, along with the successes of Operation Matador and Squeeze play, the violence continued to steadily increase.

The operation had two controversies about names: The name of the operation was criticized by some for its association with the US Civil War. The other controversy was created by a photo of one of the tanks which was named "The New Testament." This was used by some parties including Michael Moore to claim that the US was religiously motivated and was conducting a crusade while in Iraq. The tank was renamed shortly after the operation.
