= James L. Underhill =

United States Marine Corps general

James Latham Underhill
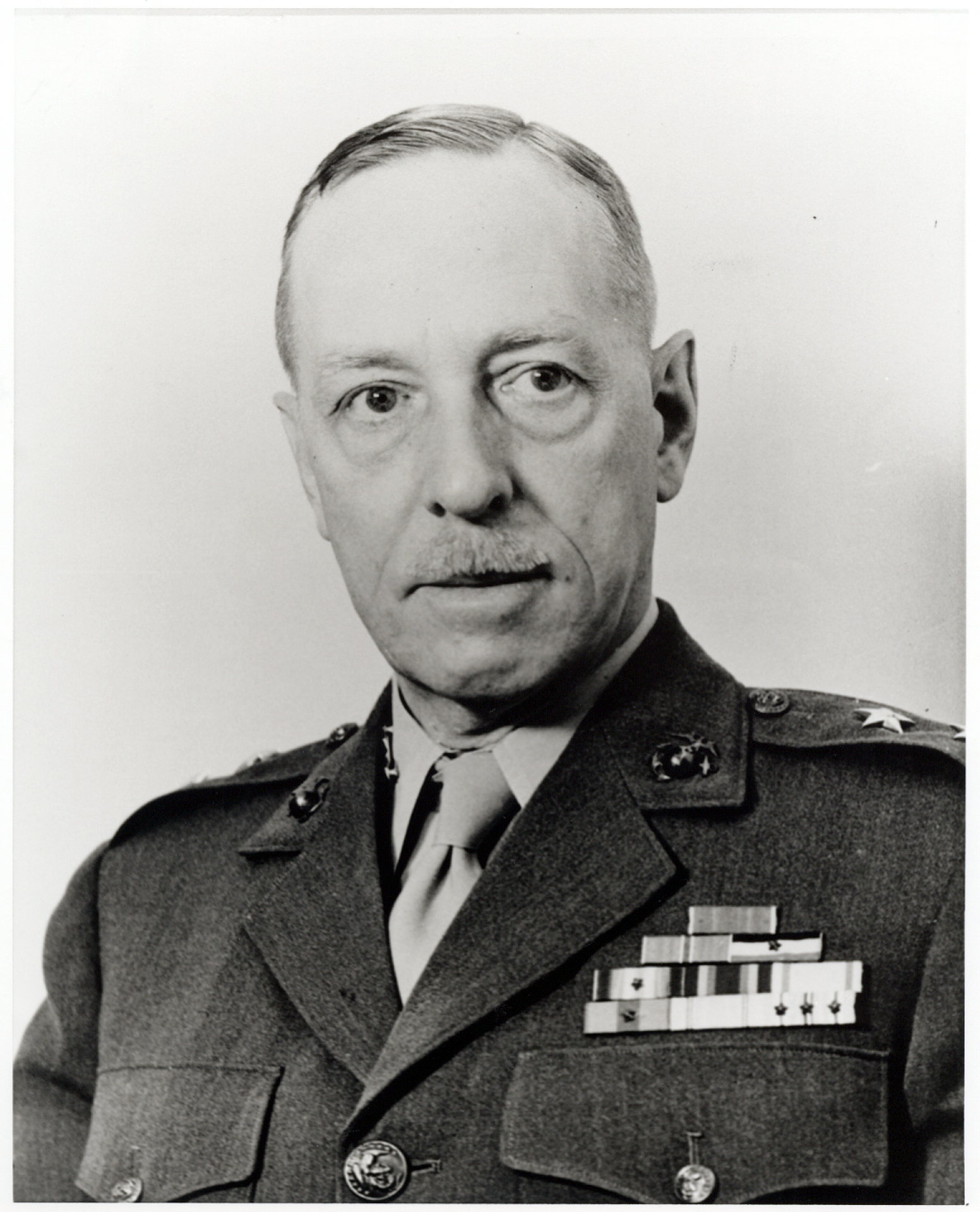
- Born: June 12, 1891; San Francisco, California, US
- Died: October 7, 1991 (aged 100); Monterey, California, US
- Military career
- Allegiance: United States
- Branch: United States Marine Corps
- Service years: 1917–1946
- Rank: Lieutenant General
- Service number: 0-1004
- Commands: ADC of 4th Marine Division
- Conflicts: World War I Nicaraguan Campaign World War II: Marshall Islands campaign; Battle of Kwajalein; Battle of Saipan; Battle of Tinian
- Awards: Legion of Merit; Bronze Star Medal

James Latham Underhill (June 12, 1891 – October 7, 1991) was an officer of the United States Marine Corps with the rank of lieutenant general, who served as Assistant Division Commander of 4th Marine Division and later as Inspector of the Fleet Marine Force, Pacific during World War II.

== Early career ==
James L. Underhill was born on June 12, 1891, in San Francisco. After the attending of local schools, he attended the University of California and graduated with Bachelor of Science degree in 1913. Underhill was commissioned second lieutenant in the Marine Corps on August 20, 1913, and his first assignment was with Marine Officers' School at Marine Barracks Norfolk, Virginia.

== World War II ==
Colonel Underhill was transferred to the Headquarters Marine Corps in Washington, D.C., where he was appointed executive officer of the Adjutant and Inspector's Department in July 1939. He served in this capacity until March 1942, when he was appointed commander of the Marine Corps Base San Diego, California. Underhill was also promoted to the rank of brigadier general on 28 March 1942.

One year later, Brigadier General Underhill was transferred to the Command of Marine Corps Base Camp Lejeune, North Carolina. When 4th Marine Division was activated in August 1943, Underhill was appointed division assistant commander. He subsequently supervised the training together with the division commander, Major General Harry Schmidt, before it was shipped out to the Pacific in January 1944.

Underhill commanded Preliminary Landing Group during the landing at Kwajalein Atoll. He landed with 25th Marine Regiment and coordinated the landings with artillery support. Underhill was succeeded in his capacity of assistant division commander by Samuel C. Cumming on 11 April 1944. He was promoted to the rank of major general in May 1944 and also decorated with the Legion of Merit for his efforts during the Kwajalein operation.

Major General Underhill was subsequently appointed Tinian Island Commander and was responsible for the Island's defense. He served in this capacity until November 1944, when he was appointed deputy commander of Fleet Marine Force, Pacific. He served in this capacity until March 1945, when he was appointed inspector of Fleet Marine Force, Pacific.

== Postwar career ==
Underhill returned to the United States and was appointed president of the Postwar Personnel Reorganization Board at Headquarters Marine Corps, Washington, D.C. in 1946. This office was tasked with study of the records of all officers, who wanted to stay in the active service. Underhill was responsible for recommendations, who would stay in active service and who would not. He finally retired from the Marine Corps on November 1, 1946. Underhill was also advanced to the rank of lieutenant general for having been specially commended in combat.

After his retirement from the military, he resided in Carmel, California, and cooperated with the Defense Language Institute. Underhill died on October 7, 1991, at the age of 100 in Monterey, California.

== Decorations ==

| 1st Row | Legion of Merit | Bronze Star Medal | | Navy Presidential Unit Citation with one star |
| 2nd Row | Marine Corps Expeditionary Medal with one star | World War I Victory Medal with France clasp | Yangtze Service Medal | China Service Medal |
| 3rd Row | American Defense Service Medal | American Campaign Medal | Asiatic-Pacific Campaign Medal with three 3/16 inch service stars | World War II Victory Medal |

== Family ==
Underhill had a sister and two brothers. His older brother Lewis K. Underhill was an Army lawyer and 1913 West Point graduate. His younger brother Robert M. Underhill was a University of California administrator who managed the finances of the secret Los Alamos Project Y site in New Mexico during World War II.
