= Walter W. Wensinger =

U.S. Marine Corps Lieutenant General

Walter William Wensinger
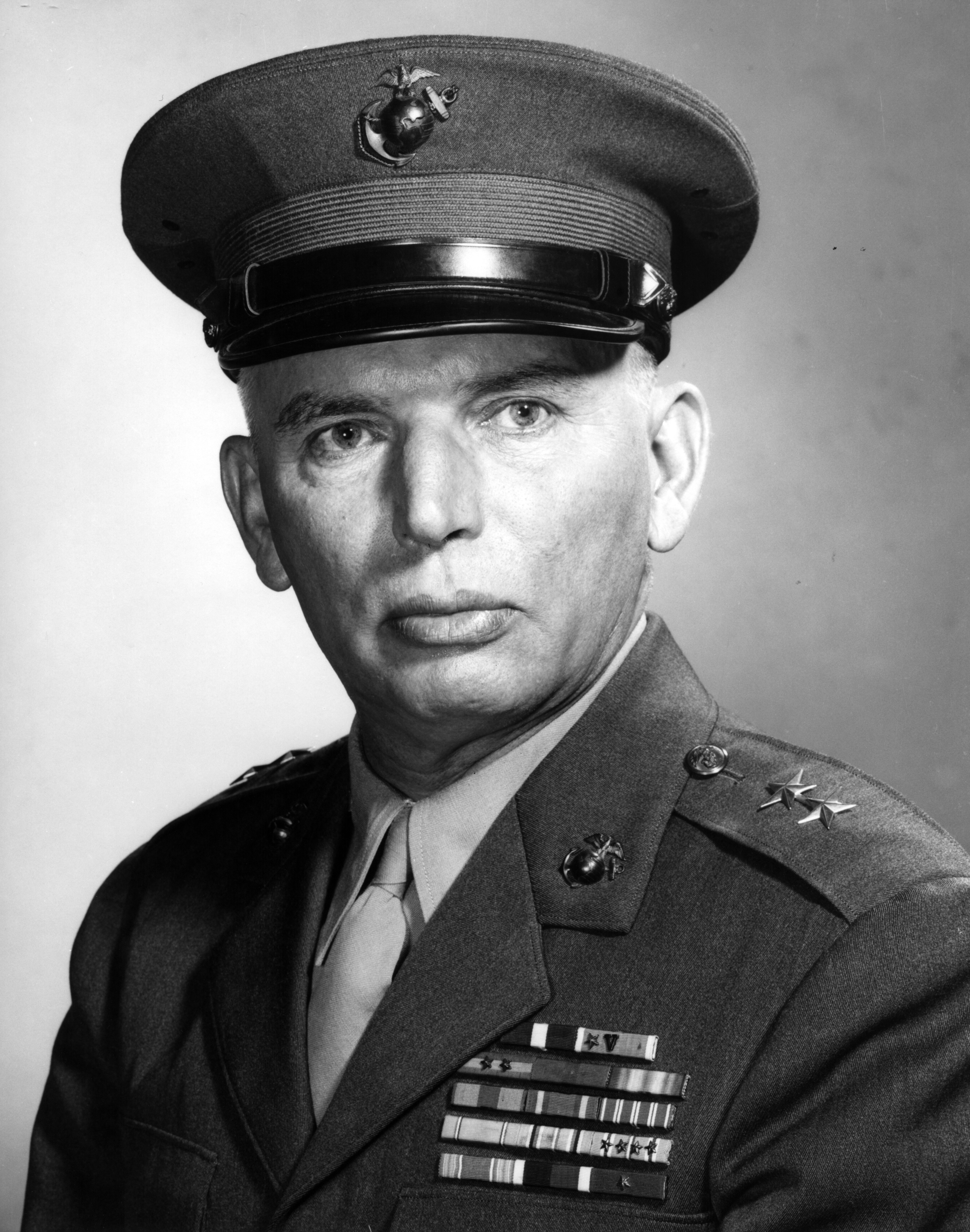
- Walter W. Wensinger as Major General, USMC
- Born: September 4, 1894; Defiance, Ohio, US
- Died: July 10, 1972 (aged 77); Washington, D.C., US
- Burial place: Arlington National Cemetery
- Military career
- Allegiance: United States of America
- Branch: United States Marine Corps
- Service years: 1917–1956
- Rank: Lieutenant General
- Service number: 0-1045
- Commands: Director of Plans and Policies; 23rd Marine Regiment
- Conflicts: World War I; Yangtze Patrol; Nicaraguan Campaign; World War II; Battle of Roi-Namur; Battle of Saipan; Battle of Tinian; Battle of Iwo Jima
- Awards: Navy Cross; Legion of Merit (2)

Walter William Wensinger (September 4, 1894 – July 10, 1972) was a highly decorated officer of the United States Marine Corps with the rank of Lieutenant General. He is most noted for his service as Commanding Officer of 23rd Marine Regiment during Battle of Iwo Jima, when he received the Navy Cross, the United States military's second-highest decoration awarded for valor in combat. Wensinger finished his career as special advisory Assistant to the Commandant to the Marine Corps.

== Early career ==
William W. Wensinger was born on September 4, 1894, in Defiance, Ohio, and attended high school in Fremont, Ohio. He subsequently enrolled the University of Michigan Law School in Ann Arbor and graduated with Bachelor of Laws in June 1917. Wensinger then enlisted in the Marine Corps as private and served with 8th and 13th Marine Regiments at Marine Barracks Quantico, Virginia. He reached the non-commissioned officer's rank and received Good Conduct Medal for exemplary behavior and efficiency. Wensinger was also selected for the Meritorious Non-Commissioned Officers Program and promoted to the rank of second lieutenant on December 16, 1918.

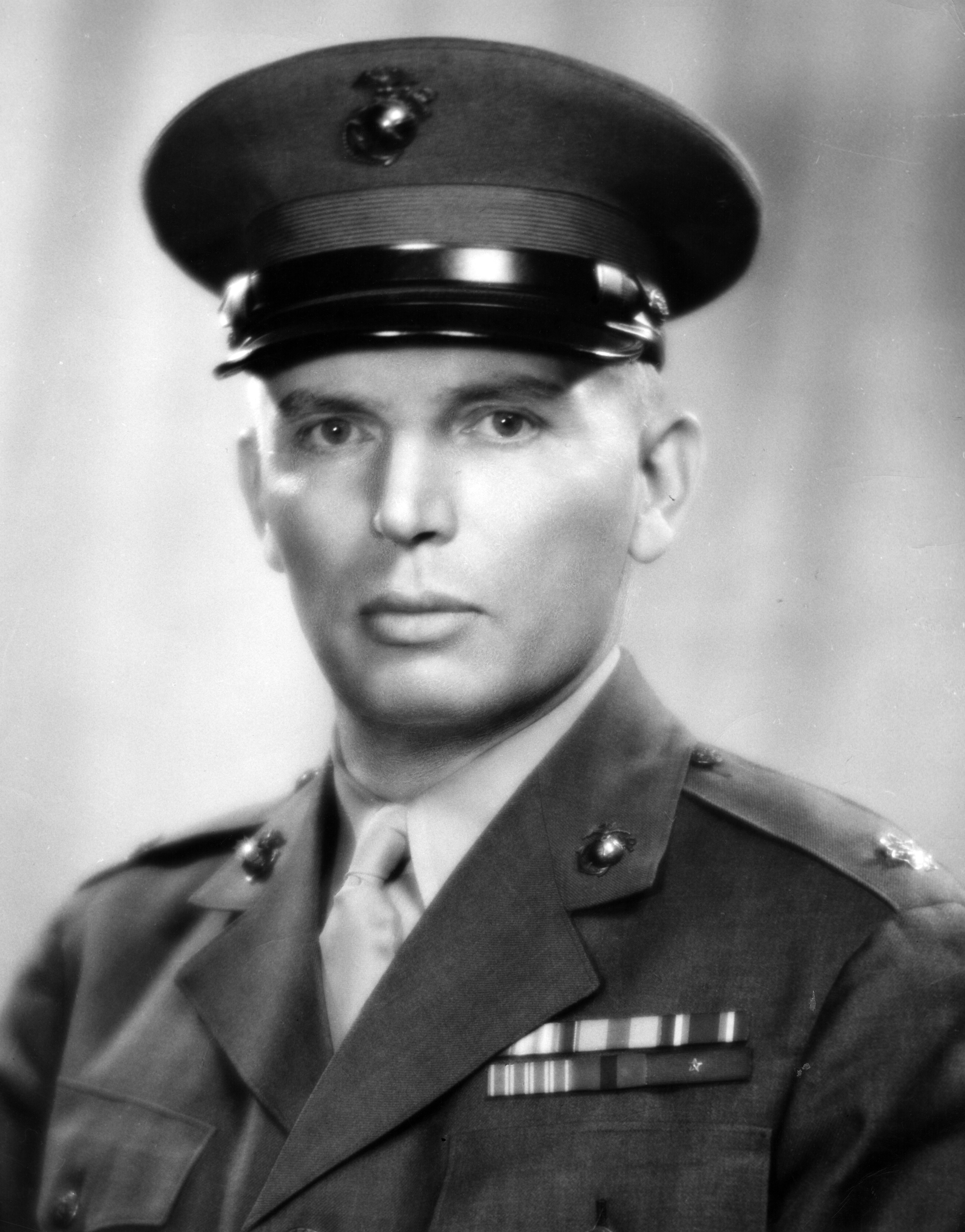
Walter W. Wensinger is shown here as lieutenant colonel in the prewar photo.

Upon the promotion, he was ordered to the Basic School at Philadelphia Navy Yard for further officers' education and completed the school in April 1919. His first assignment was with the Marine detachment aboard the battleship USS Nevada and spent two and half years with sea duties in the Pacific Ocean. Wensinger was transferred to the Marine barracks at Mare Island Naval Shipyard in November 1921 and then to the Marine barracks at Pearl Harbor Navy Yard in March 1924.

He served there two years and subsequently was transferred to the staff of Candidate Class at Marine Barracks, Washington, D.C. before he was ordered to Quantico at the beginning of 1927. Wensinger sailed with 6th Marine Regiment, 3rd Marine Brigade under Brigadier General Smedley Butler for expeditionary duty to China. He served Brigade Intelligence Officer until his return to the United States in January 1929.

Wensinger then served as commanding officer of the Marine barracks at Pacific Coast Torpedo Station in Keyport, Washington, until December 1930, when he was ordered for his second tour of expeditionary duty to Nicaragua. He served as Brigade adjutant of 2nd Marine Brigade under Brigadier General Frederic L. Bradman and distinguished himself during an earthquake and fire which devastated the city of Managua on March 31, 1931. He distinguished himself and was awarded a Special Letter of Commendation by the Secretary of the Navy, Charles F. Adams III and also received Nicaraguan Presidential Medal of Merit with Diploma.

The Second Marine Brigade was ordered back to the States in November 1931 and general Bradman assumed duty as commanding general of Marine Corps Base San Diego. He was aware of Wensinger's skills and appointed him his Aide-de-camp. Wensinger was promoted to the rank of captain in May 1932 and ordered to the Company Officers' School at Quantico, where he served as a student and then as an instructor. He left Quantico in order to be appointed commanding officer of the Marine detachment aboard the battleship USS New Mexico and served two years with sea duties in the Pacific Ocean.

In July 1937, Wensinger was transferred to Washington, D.C., and assigned to the Office of Judge Advocate General of the Navy under Rear Admiral Gilbert J. Rowcliff. During that time, he was promoted to the rank of major and then to lieutenant colonel. He was ordered to the Marine Corps Schools, Quantico, in August 1940 and attended Senior Course. Then served as an instructor there until late 1942.

== World War II ==
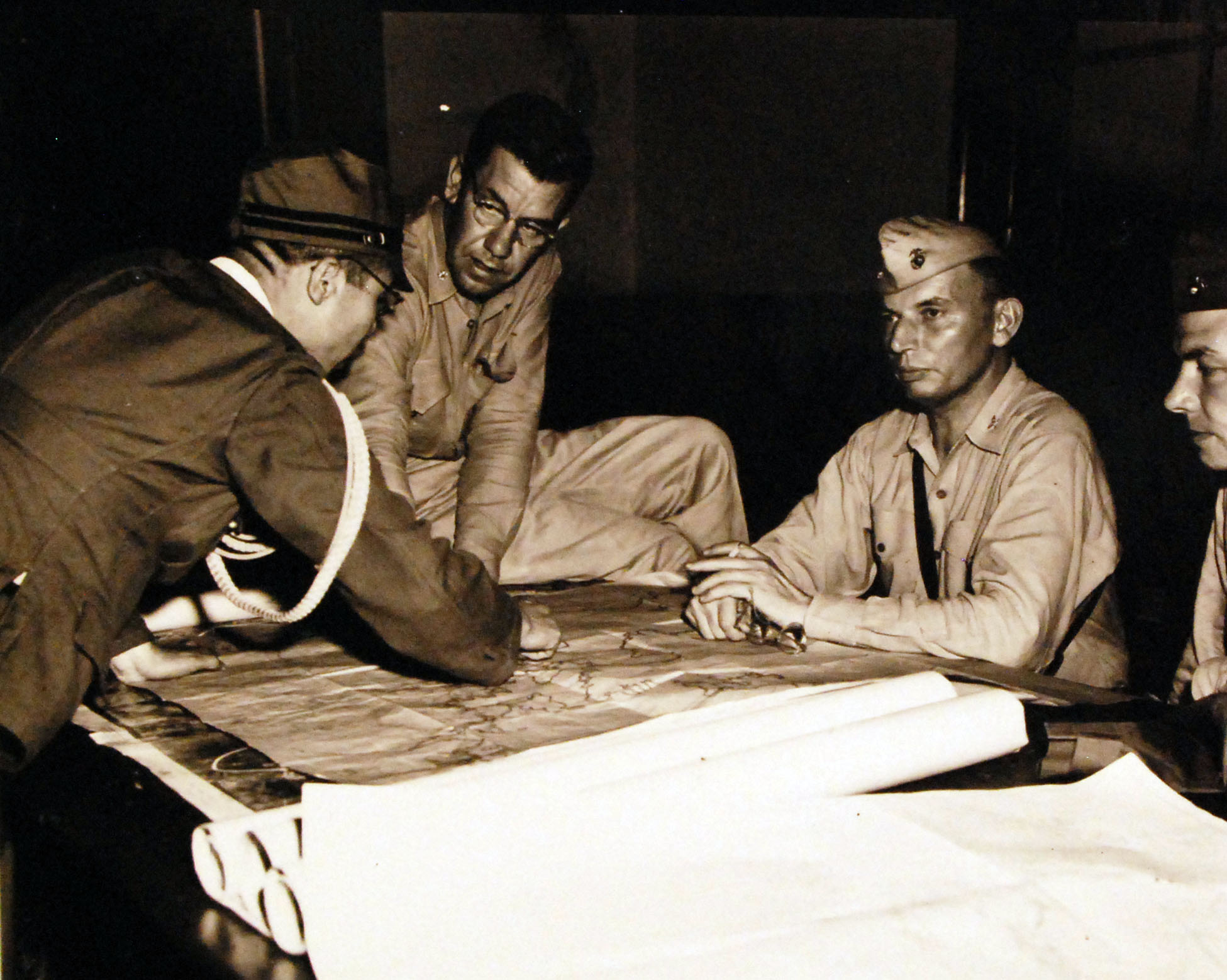
Colonel Walter W. Wensinger (second from right), Assistant Chief of Staff for Operations, V Amphibious Corps, receives Japanese surrender from Navy Captain Takahashi at Sasebo, Kyushu on September 21, 1945.

Wensinger was ordered to Fort Leavenworth, Kansas, in November 1942 in order to attend the Army Command and General Staff College and completed the course in February 1943. He was then ordered back to Quantico and appointed assistant director of the Staff and Command Course at the Marine Corps Schools under Brigadier General Clifton B. Cates.

With the activation of 4th Marine Division in July 1943 at San Diego, Wensinger was promoted to the rank of colonel and appointed divisional assistant chief of staff for operations and training. After intensive training, he sailed with the division for Pacific area in January 1944 and took part in the Battle of Roi-Namur in the Marshall Islands. The Fourth division under the command of Major General Harry Schmidt captured the large Japanese aerodrome at Roi-Namur and only 51 survivors of an original garrison of 3,500. Wensinger received the Legion of Merit with Combat "V" for the planning of the operation and leadership during the campaign.

He served in the same capacity during the Mariana Islands Campaign in the summer of 1944, when Fourth Marine Division, now under the command of his old superior from Quantico – Major General Clifton B. Cates, attacked and captured the islands of Saipan and Tinian and received second Legion of Merit for his service during that campaign.

When commanding officer of 23rd Marine Regiment, Colonel Louis R. Jones, was promoted and transferred in October 1944, General Cates chose Wensinger as his substitute. He led 23rd Marines during the battle of Iwo Jima in February 1945 and received the Navy Cross, the United States military's second-highest decoration awarded for valor in combat. His official citation reads:

The President of the United States of America takes pleasure in presenting the Navy Cross to Colonel Walter W. Wensinger (MCSN: 0-1045), United States Marine Corps, for extraordinary heroism as Commanding Officer of the Twenty-Third Marines, FOURTH Marine Division, in action against enemy Japanese forces on Iwo Jima, Volcano Islands, from 19 February to 16 March 1945. Occupying an exposed position under heavy fire from land artillery and coastal defense guns, Colonel Wensinger personally directed the landing attack of his Regimental Combat Team over a beach strongly defended by a fiercely resisting enemy. Observing that his leading elements were suffering heavy casualties and that the tanks and other mechanized equipment were unable to assist in the advance, he ordered the movement of his Command Post to the immediate vicinity of the front lines. Landing amidst intense fire from mortars, artillery and automatic weapons to discover that the beach and evacuation facilities were completely disrupted and inoperative, Colonel Wensinger quickly provided improvised means for the removal of the wounded and for the essential supply of his units ashore and, upon arriving at the advanced location of his Command Post, aggressively maneuvered the units under his command in effecting the rapid seizure of the assigned objectives. Courageously continuing the attack the following day, he remained in the forward area throughout the day and contributed materially to the successful completion of this vital operation. Colonel Wensinger's superb leadership, gallant fighting spirit and tactical skill were in keeping with the highest traditions of the United States Naval Service.

== Postwar service ==
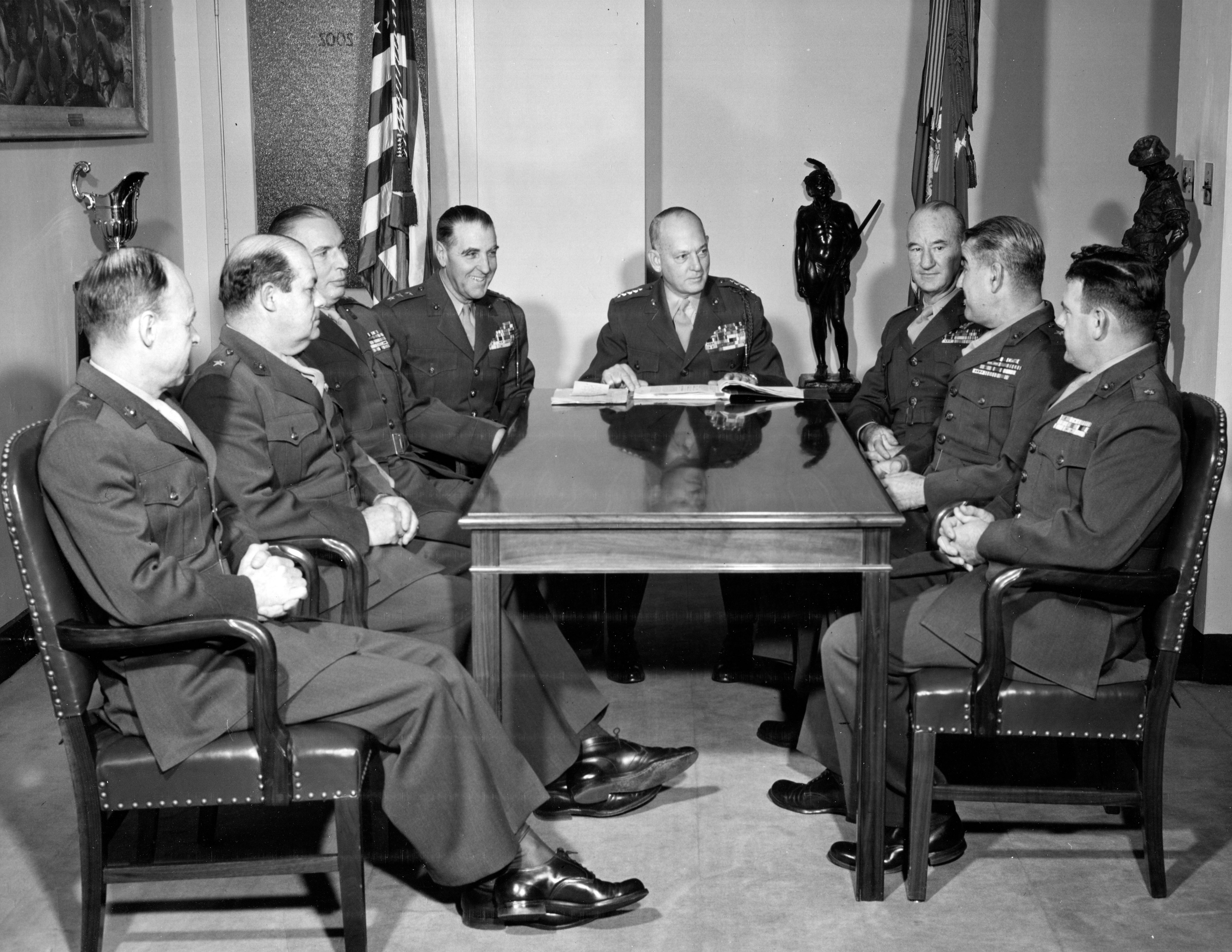
General Wensinger (third from left) as Deputy Chief of Staff during meeting with Commandant, Lemuel C. Shepherd Jr.

In April 1945, Wensinger was transferred to the staff of V Amphibious Corps under Lieutenant General Harry Schmidt as assistant chief of staff for operations. He took part in the planning for upcoming invasion of Japan, but following the Surrender of Japan in August 1945, V Amphibious Corps was transferred to Japan as occupation force. Wensinger also served additional duty as chief of staff, Advanced Command Post and represented V Amphibious Corps and Sixth Army in dealing with Japanese authorities in Southern Japan and accept surrender of Sasebo.

Following the deactivation of the V Amphibious Corps in February 1946, Wensinger was ordered back to the United States and served briefly in the Office of the Inspector-General of the Navy, before assumed duty as commanding officer of the Marine barracks at the Puget Sound Naval Shipyard in Bremerton, Washington. He also performed additional duties as District Marine Officer of the 13th Naval District until February 1948, when he was appointed Legal Aide and Legislative Counsel to the Commandant of the Marine Corps, Clifton B. Cates – his old superior from 4th Marine Division. He was promoted to the rank of brigadier general at that time for his new assignment.

Wensinger was promoted to the rank of major general in October 1951 and assumed duties as director of plans and policies at Headquarters Marine Corps in December of that year. He was later appointed deputy chief of staff and a member of the Navy Department Task Force in the Office of the Assistant Secretary of Defense for Manpower and Personnel. Wensinger's last assignment came in July 1954, when he was appointed special advisory assistant to the commandant of the Marine Corps, General Lemuel C. Shepherd. He retired from the Marine Corps on August 1, 1956, after 39 years of active service and was advanced to the rank of lieutenant general for having been specially commended in combat.

Lieutenant General Walter W. Wensinger died on July 10, 1972, in Veterans Administration Hospital in Washington, D.C., and is buried at Arlington National Cemetery, Virginia, together with his wife, Katherine E. Wensinger (1897–1991).

== Decorations ==
Here is the ribbon bar of Lieutenant General Walter W. Wensiger:

1st Row	Navy Cross		Legion of Merit with Combat "V" one 5/16" Gold Star		Navy Presidential Unit Citation with two stars
2nd Row	Marine Corps Good Conduct Medal	World War I Victory Medal	Marine Corps Expeditionary Medal	Yangtze Service Medal	
3rd Row	Second Nicaraguan Campaign Medal	American Defense Service Medal	American Campaign Medal	Asiatic-Pacific Campaign Medal with four 3/16 inch service stars	
4th Row	World War II Victory Medal	Navy Occupation Service Medal	National Defense Service Medal	Nicaraguan Presidential Medal of Merit with Diploma	

Military offices
Preceded by James Snedeker	Legal aide to the Commandant of the Marine Corps; February 1948 - October 1951	Succeeded by Homer L. Litzenberg
