= 4th Assault Amphibian Battalion =

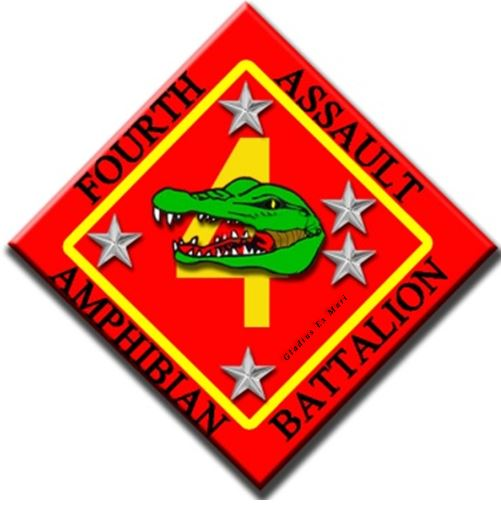
- 4th AABN's Insignia
- Active: August 19, 1943 – present
- Country: United States of America
- Branch: United States Marine Corps
- Type: Mechanized battalion
- Role: Amphibious assault
- Part of: 4th Marine Division; Marine Forces Reserve
- Garrison/HQ: Tampa Bay, Florida
- Nicknames: 4th Tracks; Iron Gators
- Motto: Gladius Ex Mari
- Engagements: World War II; Battle of Kwajalein; Battle of Guam; Battle of Okinawa; Operation Desert Storm; Global War on Terror; Operation Iraqi Freedom; Operation Enduring Freedom

The 4th Assault Amphibian Battalion (4th AABn) is a mechanized battalion of the United States Marine Corps Reserve. Their primary weapon system is the AAV-P7/A1 (formerly LVTP-7) Amphibious Assault Vehicle and they are part of the 4th Marine Division of the Marine Forces Reserve. The unit is based out of Marine Corps Reserve Center (MARCORESCEN) Tampa, Florida, with subordinate units at MARCORESCEN Galveston, Texas; MARCORESCEN Jacksonville, Florida; and MARCORESCEN Norfolk at Joint Expeditionary Base Little Creek-Fort Story, Virginia.

== Mission ==
To land the surface assault elements of the landing force and their equipment in a single lift from assault shipping during amphibious operations to inland objectives.

To conduct mechanized operations and related combat support in subsequent operations ashore.

== Organization ==
Name	Location
H&S Company	Tampa, Florida
Alpha Company	Norfolk, Virginia
Bravo Company	Jacksonville, Florida
Littoral Craft Company Charlie Company	Galveston, Texas
Littoral Craft Company Delta Company	Tampa, Florida

== History ==
=== 1943 – 1945 ===
Activated on August 19, 1943, at Camp Pendleton, California, as the 4th Amphibian Tractor Battalion, Division Special Troops, 4th Marine Division, Fleet Marine Force.

Reassigned during January 1944 to Corps Troops, Amphibious Corps, and deployed to the Pacific area.

Reassigned during April 1944 to Corps Troops, 3rd Amphibious Corps, and participated in the following campaigns in World War II:

- Battle of Kwajalein
- Battle of Guam
- Battle of Okinawa

Redesignated on September 8, 1944, as the 4th Amphibian Tractor Battalion, Fleet Marine Force, Pacific Troops, 3rd Amphibious Corps.

Detached on November 11, 1944, from the 3rd Amphibious Corps.

Redesignated on July 15, 1945, as the 4th Amphibian Tractor Battalion, 2nd Amphibian Tractor Group (Provisional), Fleet Marine Force, Pacific, and deployed to Guam, Marianas Islands.

Redesignated on September 30, 1945, as the 4th Amphibian Tractor Battalion, Fleet Marine Force, Pacific.

Redeployed during October 1945 to Camp Pendleton, California and deactivated on November 26, 1945.

=== 1962 – 2000 ===
- Reactivated on July 1, 1962, at Tampa, Florida, as the 4th Amphibian Tractor Battalion, Force Troops, Fleet Marine Force, United States Marine Corps Reserve
- Redesignated on October 1, 1976, as the 4th Assault Amphibian Battalion, Fleet Marine Force, United States Marine Corps Reserve
- Participated in CONUS and OCONUS training exercises throughout the 1970s, 1980s, 1990s and 2000s
- Participated in Southwest Asia during Operation Desert Shield and Operation Desert Storm as augmentation force to sister Assault Amphibian Battalions

=== 2000 – present ===
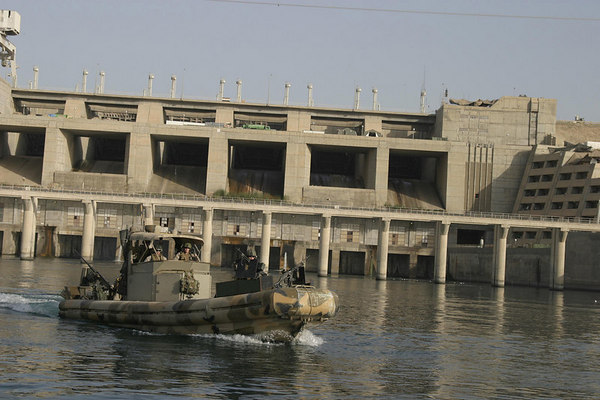
Marines from Dam Security Unit, Bravo Company, 4th Assault Amphibian Battalion patrol near Haditha Dam in 2006.

The 4th AABn has provided augmentation to its sister Assault Amphibian Battalions in the Regular Marine Corps during Operation Iraqi Freedom and Operation Enduring Freedom. These latter battalions were in the 1st Marine Division and 2nd Marine Division.

4th AABN was activated in January 2003 and deployed to the Middle East in February 2003. The Marines held camp in Camp Matilda, Kuwait before the initial push into Iraq. On March 18, 2003 only hours after President George W. Bush's speech and subsequent Coalition aerial attacks on Iraq, all convoys were staged to push into Iraq's borders. Weeks later, Bravo Company (-) reservists were the first of the battalion to set foot in Baghdad. Although destroyed bridges were an obstacle to many units, the AAV's ability to cross the major rivers was an integral part of the overall mission.

The 4th AABn has deployed company sized elements in support of Combined Joint Task Force-Horn of Africa.

In the wake of Hurricane Katrina, Alpha Company 3rd Platoon Marines stationed at Naval Construction Battalion Center Gulfport, Mississippi, deployed when the backside of Hurricane Katrina was still pounding south Mississippi. The Marines ventured out into 70 plus mile per hour winds and navigated through a wall of water that Katrina dumped on the cities of Gulfport and Biloxi. At one point during the storm, the Marines picked up some Biloxi police and firefighters and together, they looked past the flooded roads and the storm soaked yards for anyone who appeared to be trapped.

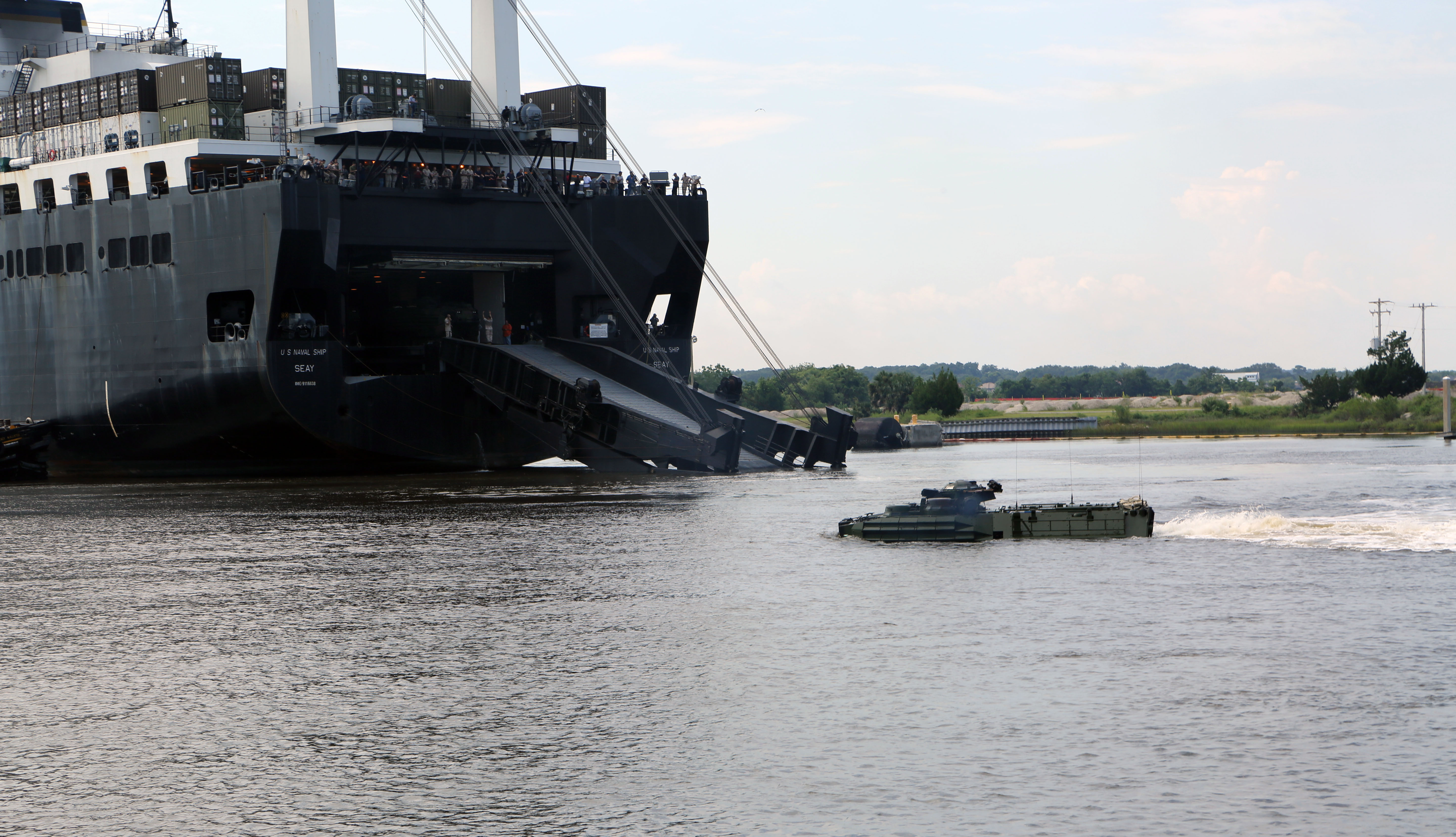
Marines with 4th Assault Amphibian Battalion, 4th Marine Division, drive an amphibious assault vehicle off the back of the USNS SEAY, a Maritime Prepositioning Ship, at Blount Island in Jacksonville, Fla., Aug. 13, 2014.

Bravo Company (-) reservists from Jacksonville, Florida, deployed to New Orleans in support of rescue and recovery operations. The unit was active for an estimated three weeks until active duty units could arrive and take over operations. While in the Area of Operations (AO), B(-) ran rescue operation on a daily basis, even while Marines were injured due to the conditions after the destruction of the storm. B(-) made it to the AO within 96 hours of the storms passing, commanding the AAV-7P/A1 down the Interstate 10 corridor. Upon arrival to New Orleans, in 10 AAV units, the Marines began to commence search and rescue operations before arriving at their base of operation at the Michoud Assembly Facility in New Orleans.

Alpha Company, 4th Assault Amphibian Battalion, was deployed to Iraq in 2008 to support Regimental Combat Team 5. There they conducted provisional infantry missions as Helo Quick Reaction Force and other infantry operations throughout the Al Anbar province. They also assisted with the retrograde of excess equipment out of Iraq and into Afghanistan or back to the United States.

Bravo Company, 4th Assault Amphibian Battalion, was deployed in 2009 to Al Asad, Iraq, attached to 1st Battalion, 8th Marines. While attached to 1st Battalion, 8th Marines, several legal issues plagued the company. The most well known incident was that a vehicle assigned to the company was found to have several gallons of water in the fuel tank. While an intense and lengthy investigation was conducted, no one was ever found guilty of the destruction of government property.

In 2011, the unit also participated in the Landing Force Cooperation Afloat Readiness and Training (LF CARAT) exercises in Thailand.

As a part of operation Intrepid Mavin 23.4 in 2023, Bravo Company, 4th Assault Amphibian Battalion deployed to Al-Quawayrah, Jordan alongside active duty marines with Fox Company, 2nd Battalion, 5th Marine Regiment. Training with the Jordanian Armed Forces(JAF) they conducted a cumulative joint-arms exercise, alongside general medical and rifle training.

In 2023 and 2024, the 4th AABn commenced a transition concurrent with the Marine Corps' eventual replacement of the tracked AAV-P7/A1 with the 8-wheel ACV-30 Amphibious Combat Vehicle. As part of the Corps' FORCE DESIGN 2030, and because ACV-30 procurement will not be sufficient to replace all AAV-P7/A1s in the Fleet Marine Force on a one-for-one basis, the battalion's operational companies at MARCORESCEN Tampa and MARCORESCEN Galveston will divest their AAV-P7/A1s and reequip as Littoral Craft Companies while the companies at MARCORESCEN Jacksonville and MARCORESCEN Norfolk at JEB Little Creek-Fort Story will transition to the ACV-30.

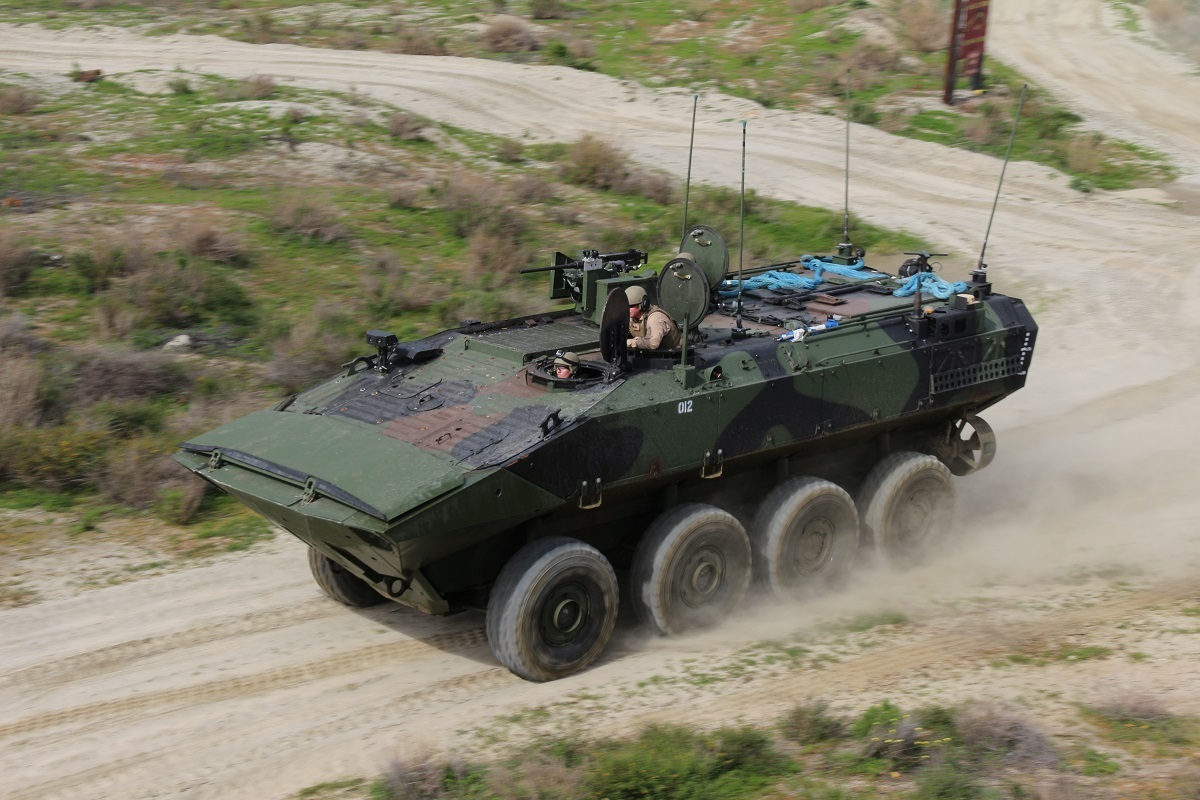
Marines from the Amphibious Combat Vehicle new equipment training team complete an operator course in the vehicle.

== Honors ==
Presidential Unit Citation - WORLD WAR II
Presidential Unit Citation - OKINAWA 1945
Asiatic-Pacific Campaign Streamer with Three Bronze Stars
WORLD WAR II Victory Streamer
Global War on Terrorism Streamer
Global War on Terrorism Expeditionary Streamer
Iraq Campaign Streamer

== See also ==
- List of United States Marine Corps battalions
- Organization of the United States Marine Corps
