= 4th Combat Engineer Battalion =

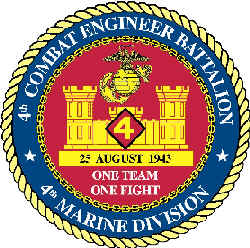
- 4th CEB insignia
- Active: 25 August 1943 – present
- Country: United States of America
- Branch: United States Marine Corps
- Type: Combat engineering
- Garrison/HQ: Baltimore, Maryland
- Mottos: "One team, one fight"
- Anniversaries: 25 August, Bn Birthday.
- Engagements: World War II: Battle of Kwajalein; Battle of Saipan; Battle of Tinian; Battle of Iwo Jima; Twenty-First Century: Iraq War; War in Afghanistan (2001-2021)

Insignia
- Identification symbol: A gold rope encircling a blue ribbon with “*4th Combat Engineer Battalion * 4th Marine Division” around a gold chain, encircling a red circle. In the red circle, at the 12 of the clock position is the Eagle Globe and Anchor (EGA). Under the EGA is a gold, three-turreted-castle with “25 August 1943” written on the foundation stone and the 4th Marine Division “red Diamond” center directly in the front of the castle. Below the castle is the Bn motto, “One Team one fight.”

The 4th Combat Engineer Battalion (4th CEB) is a combat engineer battalion of the United States Marine Corps Reserve. The headquarters is in Baltimore, Maryland and the Battalion has units in West Virginia, Alabama, Virginia, and Tennessee. They belong to the 4th Marine Division of the Marine Forces Reserve.

== Organization ==
Name	Location
Headquarters and Services Company	Baltimore, Maryland
Alpha Company	Charleston, West Virginia
Bravo Company	Roanoke, Virginia
Charlie Company	Lynchburg, Virginia
Delta Company	Knoxville, Tennessee
Echo Company	Bessemer, Alabama
Engineer Support Company	Baltimore, Maryland

== History ==
=== World War II ===
Activated 25 August 1943 at Camp Pendleton, California, as Headquarters Company, 1st Battalion, 20th Marines, 4th Marine Division, Fleet Marine Force. Deployed during February 1944 to the Pacific Theater. Redesignated 31 August, as Headquarters and Service Company, 4th Engineer Battalion, 4th Marine Division. Participated in the Battle of Kwajalein, Battle of Saipan, Battle of Tinian and the Battle of Iwo Jima. Redeployed during October 1945 to Maui, Hawaii. Relocated during November 1945 to Camp Pendleton, California, where it was deactivated on 15 November 1945.

=== 1951–2000 ===
Reactivated on 1 November 1951 at Baltimore, Maryland, as Headquarters Company, 1st Engineer Battalion. Redesignated 1 July 1962 as 4th Engineer Battalion, 4th Marine Division.

Redesignated 1 June 1976 as 4th Combat Engineer Battalion, 4th Marine Division. Participated in numerous training exercises throughout the 1970s and 1980s. Called to Active Duty December 1990 to participate in the Persian Gulf War. Released from Active Duty May 1991.

=== Global War on Terror ===
In January 2003 the Battalion activated and deployed personnel in support of the initial invasion of the Iraq War (Operation Iraqi Freedom). December 2004 activated and deployed personnel to serve as members of the 5th Civil Affairs Group and continue to support Operation Iraqi Freedom and Operation Enduring Freedom. Eight members of the battalion were killed while on operations in Iraq.

== Notable former members ==
- Rob Jones

== See also ==
- List of United States Marine Corps battalions
- Organization of the United States Marine Corps
