= 23d Marine Regiment (United States) =

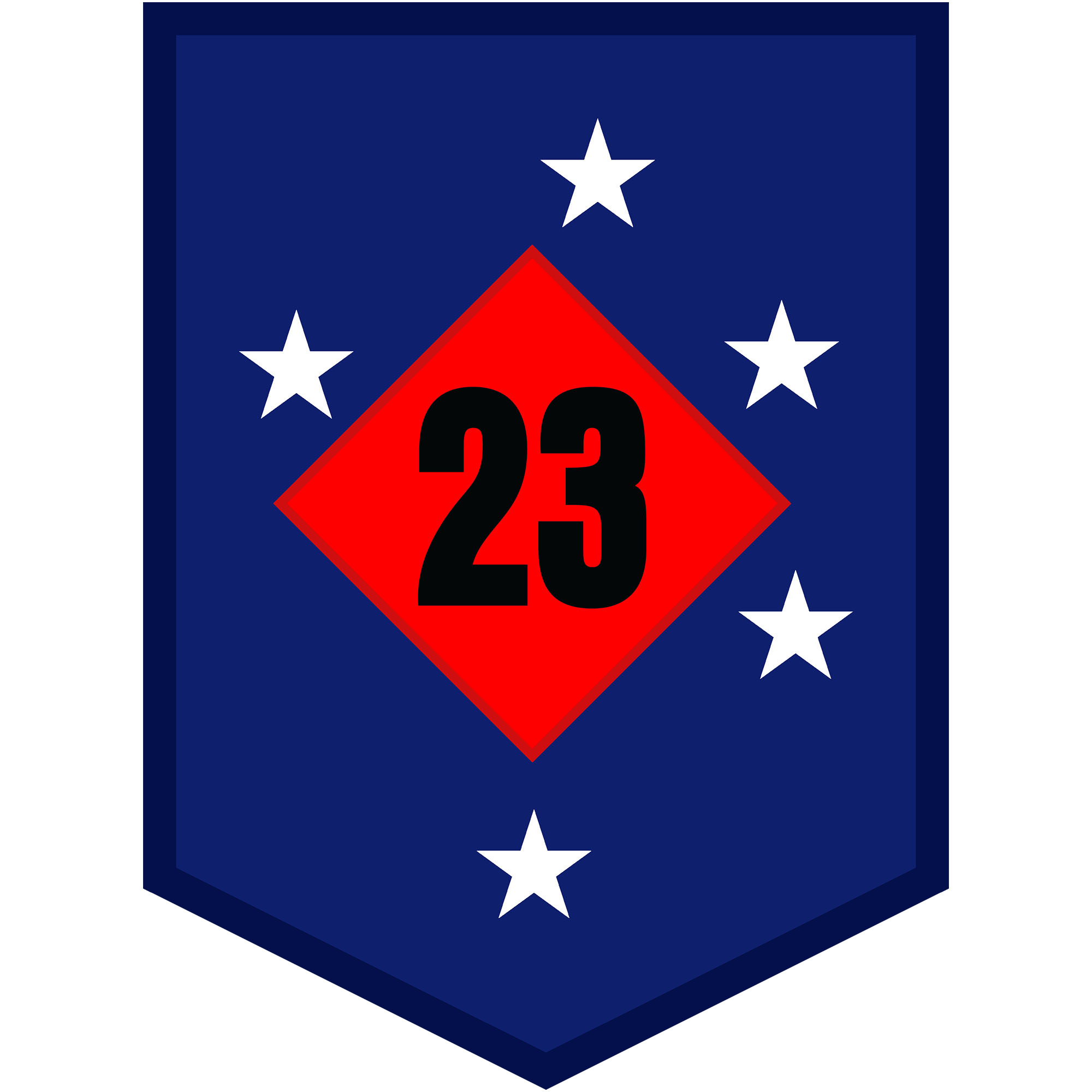
- 23d Marines’ Unit Insignia; 23d Marines insignia
- Active: 1942 – 45; 1966 – present
- Country: United States of America
- Branch: United States Marine Corps
- Type: Infantry Regiment
- Size: Approximately 4,900
- Part of: 4th Marine Division
- Garrison/HQ: San Bruno, California
- Nickname: Forager
- Engagements: World War II: Battle of Kwajalein; Battle of Saipan; Battle of Tinian; Battle of Iwo Jima; Operation Desert Storm; Iraq War; Operation Enduring Freedom

Commanders
- Current commander: Col Aaron M. Awtry
- Notable commanders: Louis R. Jones; Walter W. Wensinger

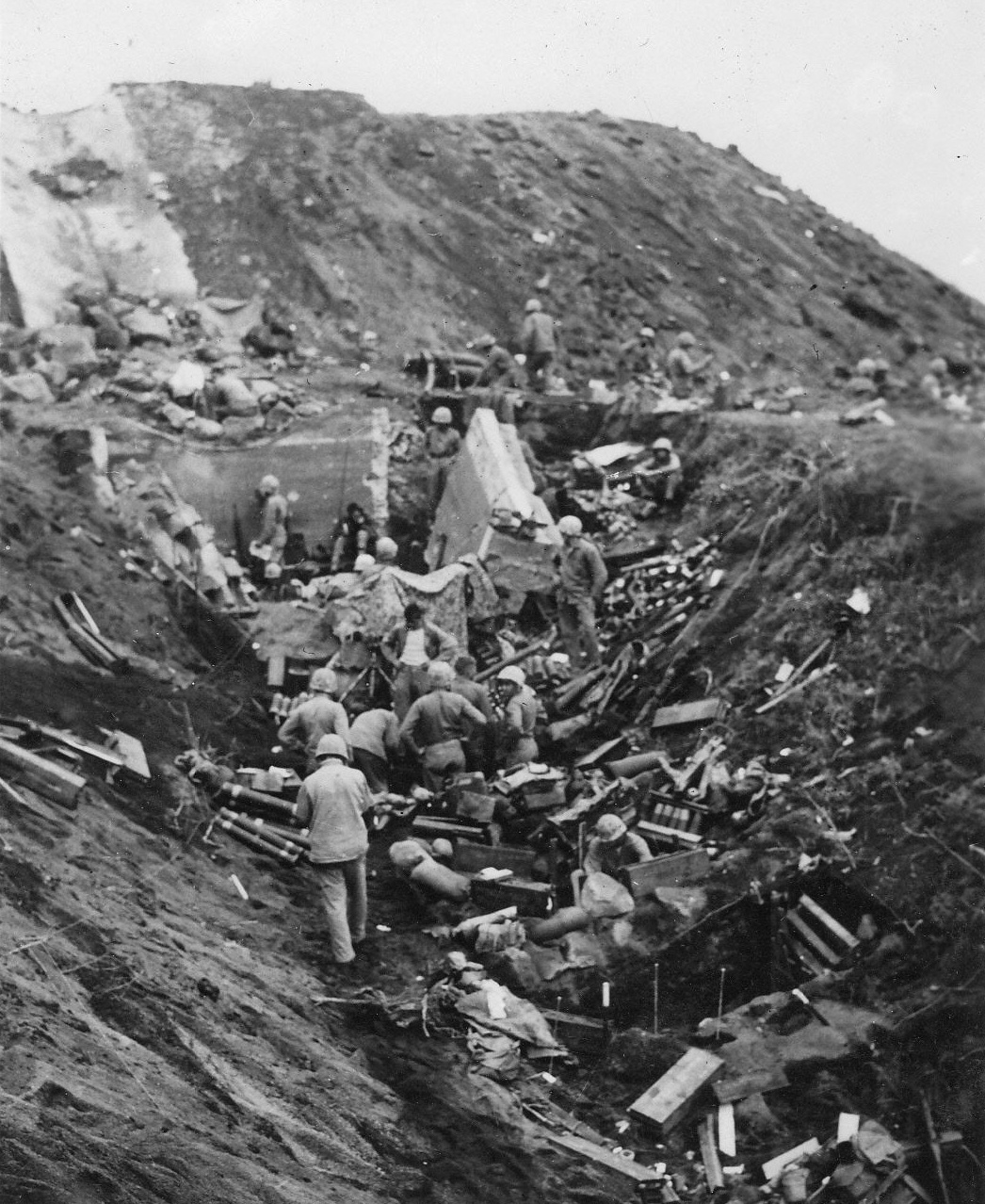
Culvert serves as command post for 23d Regiment on Iwo Jima

The 23d Marine Regiment (23d Marines) is a reserve infantry regiment of the United States Marine Corps. It is headquartered in San Bruno, California and falls under the command of the 4th Marine Division and the Marine Forces Reserve.

The regiment comprises twenty units which are geographically dispersed throughout eight states from California to Alabama. The regiment consists of Marine reservists, active duty Marines and active duty Navy personnel. The regimental headquarters is located in San Bruno, California.

== Mission ==
To provide administratively and medically ready Marines and Sailors; and trains ground combat formations to augment and reinforce the active component in order to support Combatant Commands and service level requirements.

== Subordinate units ==
- Headquarters Company 23d Marines (HQ/23d Marines) - San Bruno, California
- 1st Battalion, 23d Marines (1/23) - Ellington Field Joint Reserve Base, Texas
- 2nd Battalion, 23d Marines (2/23) - Pasadena, California
- 3d Battalion, 23d Marines (3/23) - Bridgeton, Missouri
- 2nd Battalion, 24th Marines (2/24) - Fort Sheridan, Illinois
- Truck Company, 23d Marines - Nellis Air Force Base, Nevada
  - Detachment, Truck Company, 23d Marines - Baton Rouge, Louisiana

== History ==
=== World War II ===
The 23d Marine Regiment was activated on 20 July 1942 at New River, North Carolina; was assigned to the 4th Marine Division in February 1943 and relocated during July 1943 to Camp Pendleton, California. Regiment's first commanding officer was Colonel Louis R. Jones.

During World War II, the 23d Marines participated in the following campaigns: Kwajalein, Saipan, Tinian, and the Battle of Iwo Jima. During the fierce fighting which occurred in the Pacific Theater, four Marines of the 23d Marine Regiment were awarded the Medal of Honor for valor:

1. Richard B. Anderson, 2/23, Kwajalein
2. Joseph W. Ozbourn, 1/23, Tinian
3. Darrell S. Cole, 1/23, Iwo Jima
4. Douglas T. Jacobson, 3/23, Iwo Jima

Starting at Kwajalein, the 23d Marines was assigned to land on beaches red 2 & 3 at Roi. That island was taken in a day. Saipan came next with the 23d Marines assigned to blue beaches 1 & 2 with third Battalion 20th Marines as their Shore Party (121st Seabees). Across the strait at Tinian the 23d Marines was the assault reserve landing on beach white 2. The 121st CB was still assigned to them. For the assault on Iwo Jima the 23d Marines was assigned to yellow beaches with 1/23 the left assault Battalion on yellow beach 1. The right assault Battalion 2/23 was on yellow beach 2 and 3/23 was the assault reserve. The 23d Marines did not have a Pioneer Battalion for the assault Shore Party so the Seabees of Naval Mobile Construction Battalion 133 were task assigned that duty until relieved D-plus 18. The 23d Marines made four assaults during WWII with Seabees as their beach support each time.

In October 1945, the regiment was again relocated to Camp Pendleton and was subsequently inactivated on 15 November 1945.

=== Regimental commanders ===
- Lieutenant Colonel William B. Onley (20 July 1942 - 2 September 1942)
- Colonel Louis R. Jones (3 September 1942 - 15 October 1944)
- Colonel Walter W. Wensinger (16 October 1944 - 9 April 1945)
- Lieutenant Colonel Edward J. Dillon (10 April 1945 - 2 May 1945)
- Colonel Leonard B. Cresswell (3 May 1945 - 15 November 1945)

=== 1950s to the 1990s ===
The 23d Marine Regiment was reactivated on 1 February 1966 in Alameda, California and assigned during the same month to the 4th Marine Division, USMCR.

3d Battalion, 23d Marines was activated in Nov 1990 and deployed to Saudi Arabia for Desert Shield. 3/23 was attached to the 8th Marine Regiment of the 2nd Marine Division and deployed along the Kuwaiti/Saudi Arabian border conducting patrolling and security operations. Two days before G-Day, 3/23 attacked into Kuwait at Umm Gudair to secure forward artillery positions for the support of the attack into Kuwait. With this action, 3/23 became the first unit of the 2nd Marine Division to enter combat since World War II. 3/23 continued to advance as part of 8th Marines, fighting actions into Kuwait City when the ceasefire was called.

In December 1990, the 2nd Battalion, 1st Battalion, and Headquarters Co. were activated in January 1991 as part of the 23d Marines which were mobilized by Presidential call-up to support Operation Desert Shield and Operation Desert Storm. Elements of 2nd Battalion, participated in Operation Sea Angel in 1991. 2d Battalion, 23d Marines responded to the eruption of Mt. Pinatubo in the Philippine islands in 1991 and provided critical humanitarian relief.

=== 21st century ===
The 23d Marine Regiment, either in whole or in part, have been activated multiple times including 2003, 2006, 2009, and 2011. In June, 2012, the 23d Marine Regimental Headquarters Company deployed to Barbados, Caribbean for Tradewinds 2012. In 2018, the regiment's second battalion deployed to Okinawa; it repeated this deployment in 2025.

== Unit Awards ==
- Presidential Unit Citation with one bronze star
- Navy Unit Commendation
- American Campaign Medal with 4 bronze stars
- Asiatic-Pacific Campaign Medal with 4 Arrowheads (World War II)
- World War II Victory Medal
- Navy Meritorious Unit Commendation 1990-91

== See also ==
- Marine Forces Reserve
- List of United States Marine Corps regiments
- Organization of the United States Marine Corps
- Naval Mobile Construction Battalion 133
- USS Logan ** USS Newberry ** USS Mifflin ** USS Lowndes
