= 3rd Battalion, 23rd Marines =

3rd Battalion, 23rd Marine Regiment
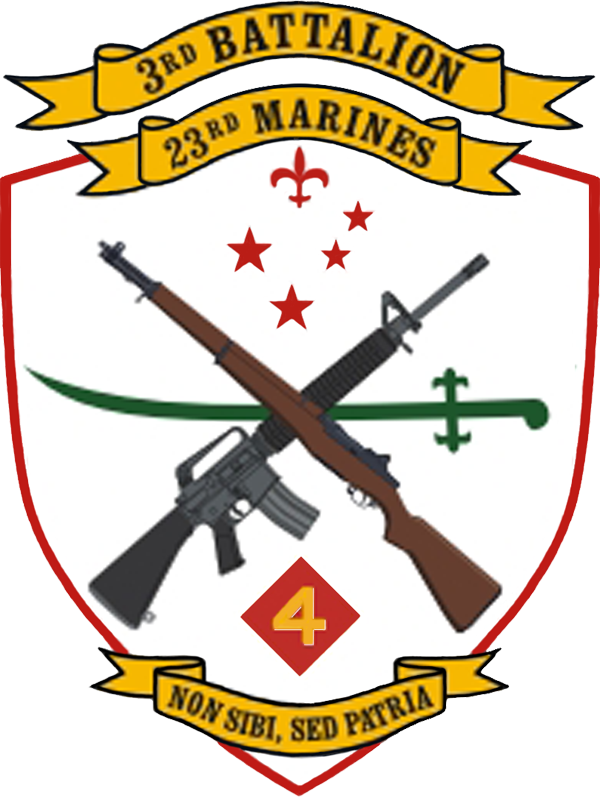
- 3rd Battalion, 23rd Marine insignia
- Active: 22 July 1942 – 10 November 1945; 1 July 1962 – present
- Country: United States
- Branch: United States Marine Corps
- Type: Infantry regiment
- Role: Locate, close with and destroy the enemy with fire and maneuver
- Size: 1,000
- Part of: 23rd Marine Regiment; 4th Marine Division
- Garrison/HQ: Saint Louis, Missouri
- Mottos: "Non Sibi, Sed Patri"
- Engagements: World War II; Pacific War; Battle of Kwajalein; Battle of Saipan; Battle of Tinian; Battle of Iwo Jima; Operation Desert Storm; Iraq War

Commanders
- Current commander: Lieutenant Colonel Joel T. Walkup
- Notable commanders: John R. Lanigan

3rd Battalion, 23rd Marine Regiment (3/23) is a reserve infantry battalion in the United States Marine Corps located throughout the Southern United States consisting of approximately 800 Marines and Sailors. The battalion was first formed in 1943 for service in the Central Pacific Area during World War II, taking part in a number of significant battles including those at Saipan and Iwo Jima before being deactivated at the end of the war. In the early 1960s, the unit was reactivated as a reserve battalion. The battalion is headquartered in Saint Louis, Missouri, with outlying units throughout the Southern United States. 3/23 falls under the command of the 23rd Marine Regiment and the 4th Marine Division. Recent operations have included tours in Iraq and Afghanistan.

== Current units ==
Name	Location
Headquarters and Service Company	Bridgeton, Missouri
TOW Section	Broken Arrow, Oklahoma
India Company	North Little Rock, Arkansas
Kilo Company	Smyrna, Tennessee
Lima Company	Montgomery, Alabama
Weapons Company	Springfield, Missouri

== Mission ==
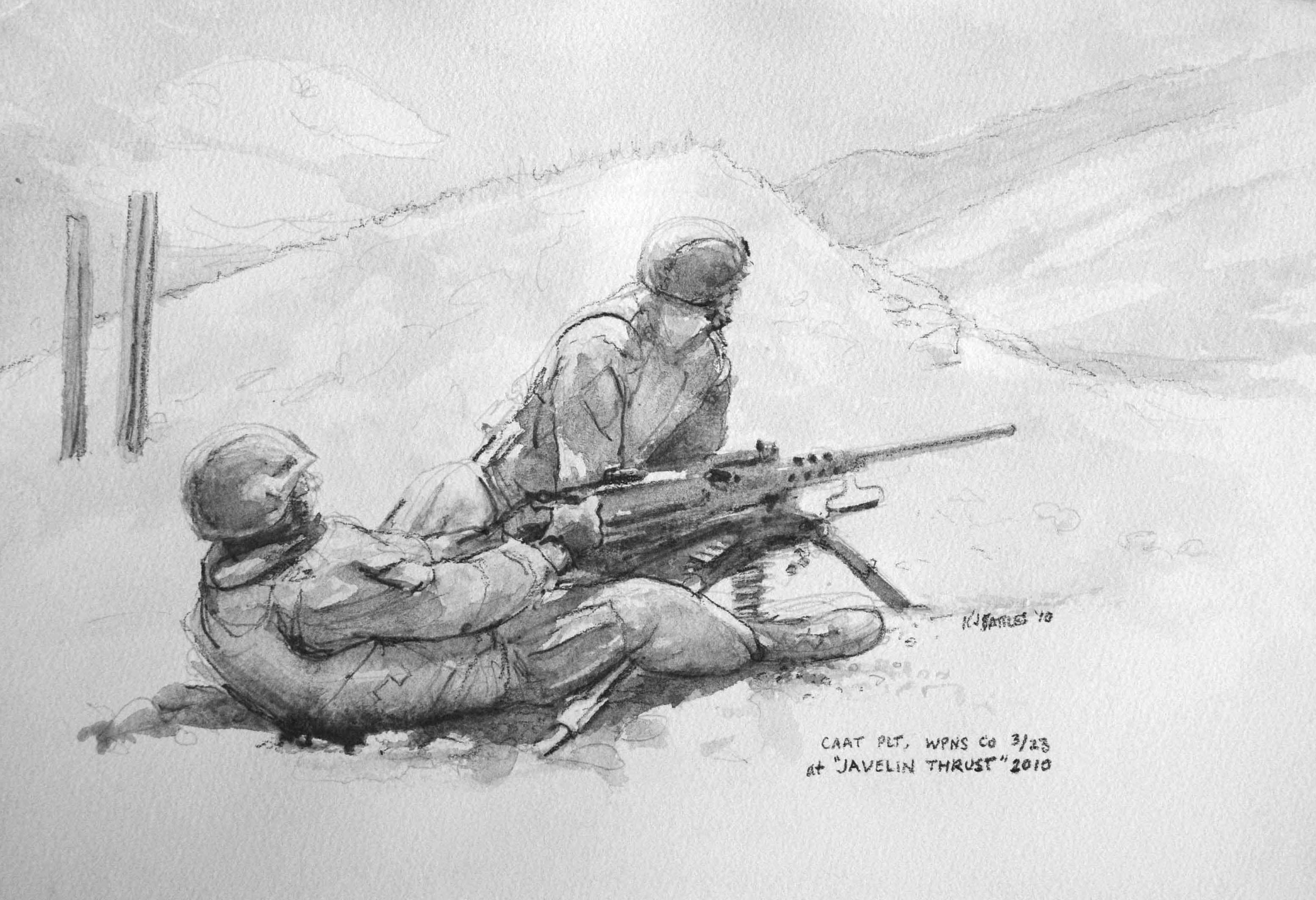
Sketch by Sgt. Kristopher J. Battles: Lance Cpl. Jonas Cuti and Cpl. James Rumfola with Weapons Company, 3rd Battalion, 23rd Marine Regiment, fire the M2 .50 caliber heavy machine gun at Hawthorne Army Depot, Nev., during exercise Javelin Thrust 2010.

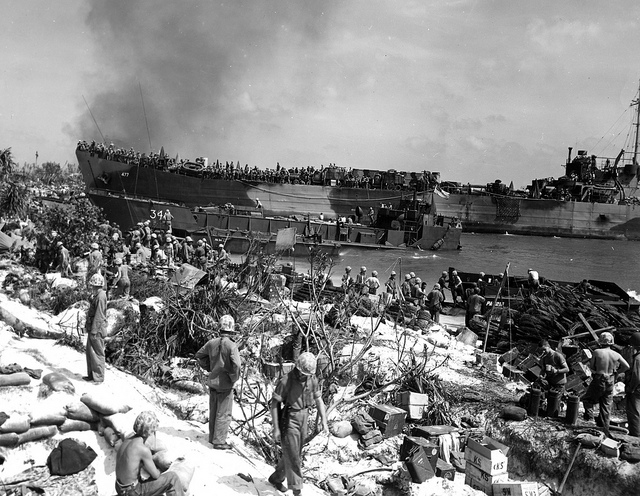
Roi-Namur 3/23 Shore Party from 3/20. - - - Seabee Museum Archives

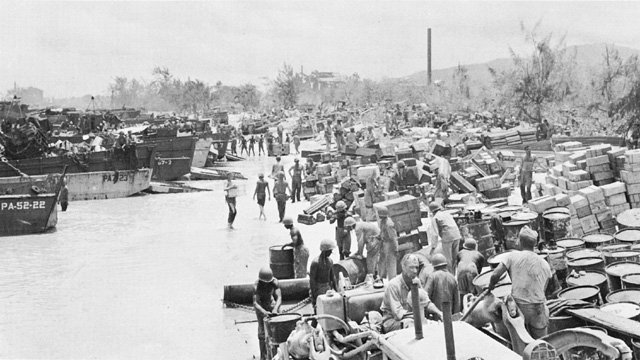
Shore Party beach blue 1, Saipan. The 23rds shore party on beach blue 1 (3/20 Seabees) . National Archives

The unit's mission is to provide a well-trained and credible force, capable of rapidly mobilizing to augment or reinforce active duty Marine Corps forces participating in missions ranging from humanitarian/peacekeeping operations to major conflicts, in time of war, national emergency or contingency operations and during peacetime to provide operation tempo relief for active forces throughout the spectrum of operations including Joint and Combined Operations. Infantry battalions are the heart and soul of the ground combat element. The mission of locating, closing with, and destroying the enemy with fire and maneuver and repelling the enemy's assault with fire and close combat lies with the "grunts". Marine infantry battalions often have limited organic equipment outside of small arms (maneuvering by foot as light infantry, and must be supplemented with additional trucks to become motorized infantry or Amphibious Assault Vehicles to become mechanized infantry).

== Organization ==
A Marine infantry battalion is organized into three rifle companies, a weapons company, and a headquarters company. The rifle company has three or four rifle platoons and a weapons platoon with medium machineguns and mortars. The weapons company includes a heavy machinegun platoon, a mortar platoon, and an assault platoon. Sometimes, the commander will mix these into Combined Anti-Armor Teams. The headquarters company includes all command, administration, intelligence, operations, logistics, and communication Marines and equipment, as well as the battalion's Surveillance and Target Acquisition teams (which include scout snipers).

== History ==
=== World War II ===
3rd Battalion, 23rd Marines was activated on 22 July 1942, at what is now Marine Corps Air Station New River, North Carolina. In July 1943, the battalion relocated to Marine Corps Base Camp Pendleton, California. In August 1943, they were assigned to 4th Marine Division. This division was formed by the organization and redesignation of several other units. The 23rd Marine Regiment began as infantry detached from the 3rd Marine Division, and an artillery battalion of the 12th Marines became the genesis of the 14th Marines and engineer elements of the 19th Marines formed the nucleus of the 20th Marines. In March the 24th Marine Regiment was organized, and then in May it was split in two to supply the men for the 25th Marines.

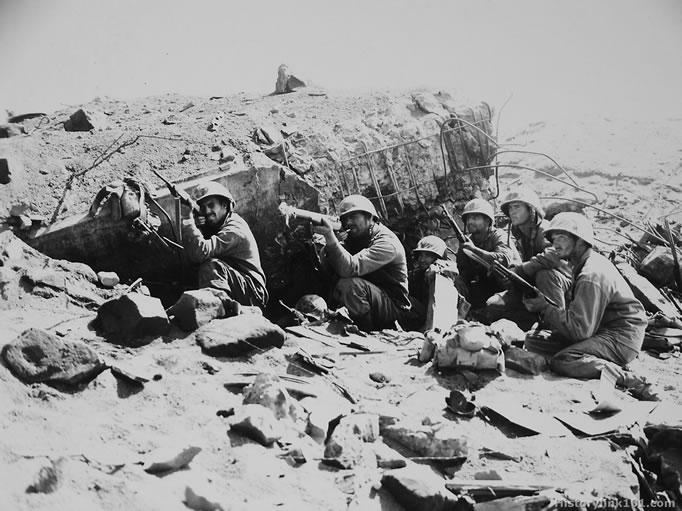
Riflemen from 3rd Battalion, 23rd Marines fire on the enemy from a destroyed Japanese pillbox. Iwo Jima – February 1945

This war-time shuffling provided the major building blocks for 4th Marine Division. The units were originally separated, however, with the 24th Marines and a variety of reinforcing units (engineer, artillery, medical, motor transport, special weapons, tanks, etc.) at Camp Pendleton in California. The rest of the units were at Camp Lejeune, North Carolina. This East Coast echelon moved to Pendleton by train and transit of the Panama Canal in July and August 1943. When all the units were finally together, the 4th Marine Division was formally activated on 14 August 1943, with Major General Harry Schmidt in command.

After intensive training, 23rd Marines shipped out on 13 January 1944, and in 13 months made four major amphibious assaults, in the battles of Kwajalein (Roi-Namur), Saipan, Tinian, and Iwo Jima, with the division suffering more than 17,000 casualties.

==== Roi-Namur ====
An account of 23rd Marines attack during the battle of Roi-Namur: "As dawn broke on D plus 1 (February 1, 1944), the LVT's waddled out of the jaws of the LST's and took up their circling, while the air strikes and naval bombardment mounted in fury. Originally, 1000 had been designated as H-hour, but, due to unforeseen difficulties (such as the lack of usable LVT's), it was changed to 1100. As It was, the first waves did not land till nearly 1200. RCT 23 attacked Roi with its strategic airfield. After the earth-shaking barrage of naval shells and aerial bombs, climaxed by a deluge of rockets fired from LCI's, opposition on Roi was comparatively light, and the 0-1 line was reached at 1217. After pulling back some over-extended units and reorganizing, RCT 23 continued the attack about 1530. The twisted steel skeletons of the hangars and the shattered remnants of the Jap planes were overrun, and the northern edge of the island was reached by 1800. All that remained was mopping up the enemy snipers who were still hiding in the drainage ditches. This was completed by the next morning, February 2, and at 0800 Roi was declared secure. The third battalions Shore Party was the Seabees of 3/20."

==== Saipan ====
For Saipan the 23rd landed on beaches blue 1 & 2. Shore party for 3/23 was the third battalion 20th Marines( 121st Seabees).

==== Iwo Jima ====
For Iwo 3/23 was commanded by Col. Shelton Scales and was the reserve Assault Battalion for Yellow Beach. They landed from the USS Lowndes (APA 154). Their assigned Shore Party was C Co. 133rd Seabees.

23rd Marine Regiment was awarded two Presidential Unit Citations and a Navy Unit Commendation, and then deactivated on 10 November 1945.

=== Operation Desert Shield/Desert Storm ===
3rd Battalion, 23rd Marines was activated in Nov 1990 and deployed to Saudi Arabia for Desert Shield. 3/23 was commanded by LtCol Ray Dawson, of Baton Rouge, Louisiana, and attached to the 8th Marine Regiment of the 2nd Marine Division and deployed along the Kuwait/Saudi Arabian border conducting patrolling and security operations. 2 days before G-Day, 3/23 attacked into Kuwait at Umm Gudair to secure forward artillery positions for the support of the attack into Kuwait. With this action, 3/23 became the first unit of the 2nd Marine Division to enter combat since World War II. 3/23 continued to advance as part of 8th Marines, fighting actions into Kuwait City when the ceasefire was called.

==== Detailed synopsis of 3/23 Desert Storm Assault ====
3d Battalion, 23rd Marines was assigned the G-Day missions of (1) providing security in the division zone forward of the Saudi defensive berm, which was located on the Saudi-Kuwait border, prior to G-Day; (2) passing through the breach lanes, and: (3) clearing its zone of action to support the attack north, and (4) screening to the northeast in order to allow 3d Battalion, 10th Marines (3/10) to establish artillery firing positions to provide preparation fires for offensive operations. Phase One was the conduct of the route reconnaissance by TOWs, heavy machine guns (HMG), combat engineers, snipers, and artillery reconnaissance assets. Phase Two was the introduction of one motorized infantry company, the battalion command element, and the 81 mm mortar platoon in the forward sector. The motorized company would be placed in a blocking position oriented northwest, facing possible Iraqi units being flushed out by 2nd LAR screening to the northwest. The teams were tasked to position themselves between the Iraqi defenses and friendly artillery to screen the Iraqi forward defensive belt, and orient to the northeast. Phase Three would be the movement of the artillery units to their firing positions on 23 February 1991, G-1, under the cover of darkness.

On 22 February 1991 (G-Day minus two), 3/23 commenced combat operations as bulldozers cut three gaps in the Saudi berm to allow 3/23 and 3/10 to execute their missions. Approximately halfway through Phase One, the 8th Marines further tasked 3/23 to provide a Forward Air Controller close to the Iraqi defenses to control an air strike on a pumping station in the Umm Gudair oil field, which had been determined to be a high priority target. This required the 81 mm mortar element to move forward of their assigned position in order to range the target for back-up marking capability. A number of Iraqi infantry and trucks were observed in and around the Iraqi trench line. In the waning daylight of 22 February 1991, the Iraqis were engaged by the forward 3/23 81 mm mortars. Simultaneously, the 3/23 Forward Air Controller (FAC) attempted to direct close air support (CAS) onto the assigned target. However, smoke and haze from the burning oil field obscured the target from the FAC, making laser designation impossible. Company I 3/23 quickly and effectively searched and cleared a large compound located forward of the Iraqi defenses discovering that, although unoccupied, it had been recently used by Iraqi forces as a major supply cache and observation point. The compound was prepared for demolition by combat engineers, and subsequently completely destroyed. Artillery fire was requested on the Iraqi defenses and Battery F, 2/14 responded as well as organic 3/23 81 mm mortar fire. The direct fire capability of 3/23 combined with the indirect fire destroyed five BTR-60s, three BDRMS, eight tanks (T-55/T-62) and inflicted approximately 52 Iraqi KIAs. 10-20 Iraqis emerged from their trenches and made their way through their minefields to members of the 81 mm mortar platoon, 3/23 quickly mobilized enemy prisoners of war (POW) processing teams which sped the POWs to the rear. The POWs were determined to be from the Iraqi 1st Battalion, 83d Brigade, 29th Infantry Division. Ultimately, the battalion captured 238 POWs, to include an Iraqi Battalion Commander, and sustained no friendly casualties.

At 0615 on 25 February 1991, G+1, 3/23 passed through the breach with 8th Marines, with the bulk of the battalion mounted on M923 5-ton trucks. During the execution of this part of the operation, Company H capture 20 POWs, sustaining no friendly casualties. 3/23 was directed to continue the movement to contact north with 8th Marines as the motorized battalion reserve. The 8th Marine Regimental Commander's intent was to utilize 3/23 for an envelopment, blocking force, MOUT operations, MSE security, flank screen/security, or POW security. As the tactical situation developed during the movement to contact on G+1, it became evident that 2d Marine Division was outdistancing 1st Marine Division, creating a gap between the two divisions. 3/23 was assigned the mission of providing flank security for the eastern flank of 2d Marine Division and 1/5 on the western flank of 1st Marine Division. As the battalion continued north to re-establish contact with 1/8 after being slowed down by NBC alerts, the main body of the battalion received fire from a farm complex to its right front. Upon receiving incoming small arms rounds, Company H deployed to clear its zone of sniper and harassing fire. The Iraqis broke contact and the battalion prepared to continue its movement north. Upon observing armored vehicles through the TOW thermal sights, the thermal signatures of at least nine Iraqis were identified. 3/23 was cleared to engage and destroy. Direct fire weapons were used to destroy a number of enemy vehicles. The exact number of kills could not be determined due to the darkness, smoke, and numerous secondary explosions; however, it was readily apparent that these vehicles had been well stocked with munitions.

At 2330 on 26 February 1991, 3/23 was subsequently directed to continue clearing the farm complex from which fire had been received the previous day. The number of Iraqi troops in the area was still undetermined due to the large number of bunkers and buildings in the complex. 8th Marine Regimental headquarters dispatched tanks from Company C, 4th Tank Battalion, and directed that the tanks lead the infantry sweep order to minimize possible friendly casualties. At 1400, the tank platoon engaged at least eight enemy tanks. The secondary explosion of an enemy vehicle caused one WIA and one KIA from 4th Tank Battalion. The operation was ceased and the battalion was directed to be prepared to execute the clearing mission in Al Shadadiyah, Kuwait the following day. The total Battle Damage Assessment (BDA) at the farm complex to that point was the destruction of 12 BMPs, two BRDMs, 9 T-62 tanks, two T-72 tanks, and one ammunition bunker. 3/23 moved further northeast to an assembly area in preparation for execution of the Al Shadadiyah MOUT operation. On their way, the lead element of the main body, Company I, came under sniper and RPG fire. Company I immediately returned fire. Company H, in the rear of the column, was immediately directed to conduct an infantry sweep of the area from which fire had been received. At 0800 on 28 February 1991, G+4, offensive hostilities were officially suspended. 3rd Battalion 23rd Marines were directed by 8th Marines to return to the farm complex with an infantry force, sweep the area, and then move combat engineers in to destroy the balance of remaining enemy equipment.

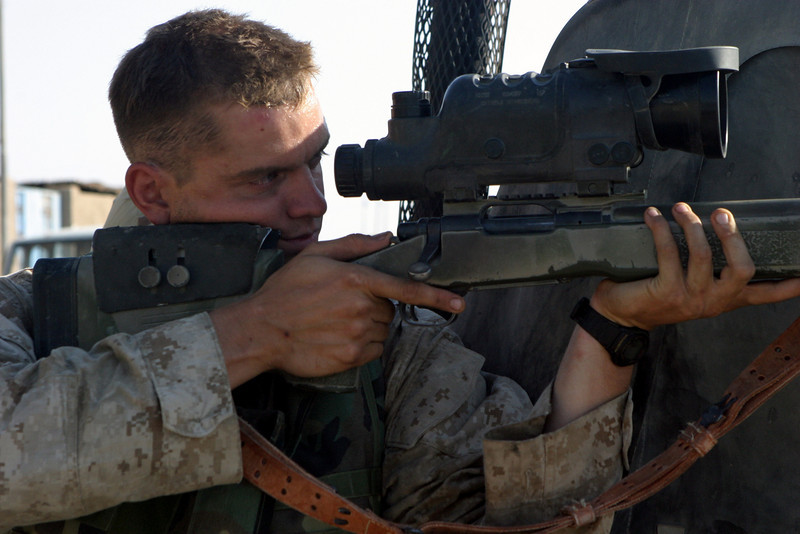
US Marine Corps Reserve (USMCR) Lance Corporal Ivey, Surveillance and Target Acquisition Platoon, 3rd Battalion, 23rd Marine Regiment (3/23), sites through the AN/PVS-10 Day/Night Vision Sniper Scope atop his 7.62mm M-40 (Remington 700) sniper rifle, following a "shots fired" incident near Al Kut, Iraq, 2007.

=== After September 11 ===
==== Operation Enduring Freedom and Operation Iraqi Freedom 2003-2008 ====
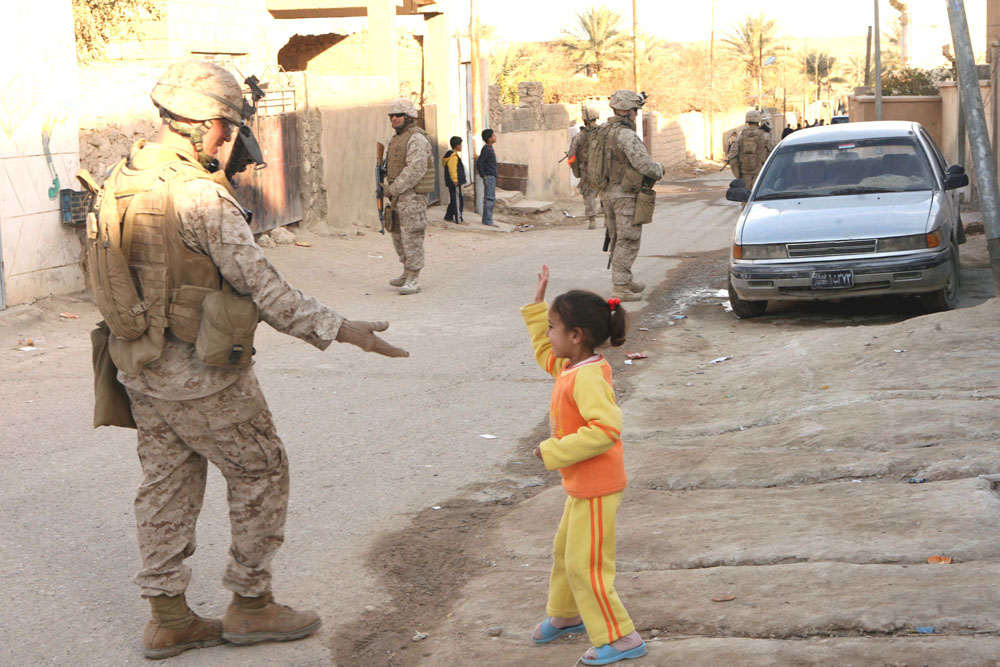
Sgt. Steven N. Penley, 26, squad leader, 3rd Battalion, 23rd Marine Regiment, Company L, gives an Iraqi girl a high-five during a meet and greet patrol through Haditha, Iraq in 2008

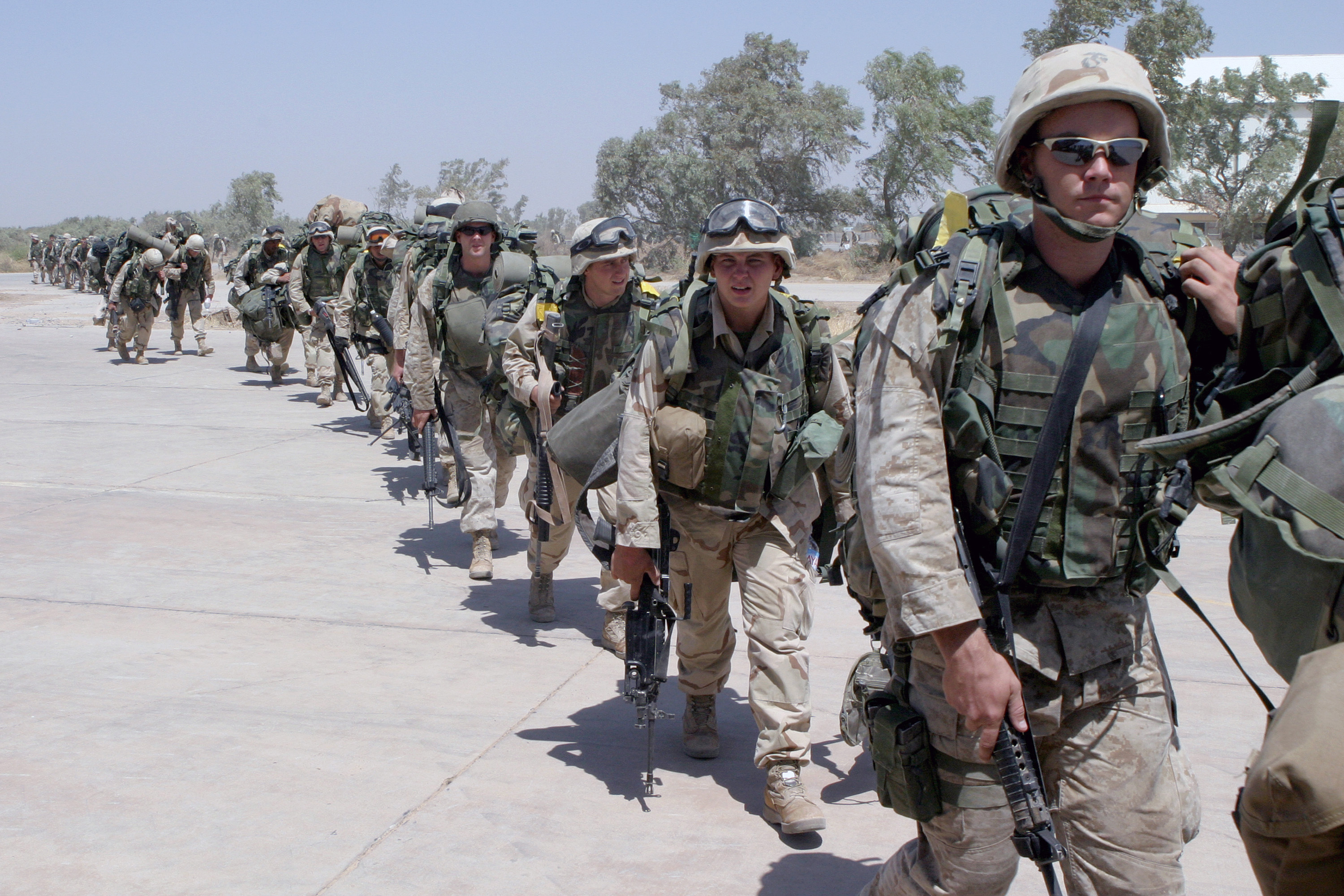
Armed US Marine Corps (USMC) Marines assigned to Lima/Company, 3rd Battalion, 23rd Marine Regiment, line up to board a transport aircraft at Blair Field in Al Kut, Iraq, during Operation IRAQI FREEDOM

3/23 was mobilized on 5 March 2003, and deployed to Iraq with the 2nd Marine Division's Task Force Tarawa located in Al Kut. Commanded by LtCol David Couvillon of Brusly, Louisiana, 3/23 conducted a relief-in-place with Task Force Tarawa, becoming responsible for the entire Wasit Province of Iraq. Subsequently attached to the 1st Marine Division, 3/23 conducted Stability and Security Operations (SASO) through August 2003. LtCol Couvillon, acting also as Military Provincial Governor, and the Marines of 3/23 (supported by Marine and Army Civil Affairs Groups, as well as an Army Military Police Company) set about reestablishing government services, security actions, humanitarian actions, border security (Iraq/Iran), and general governance until relieved by a Ukrainian Infantry Brigade in September 2003.

3/23 was mobilized for Operation Iraqi Freedom on 17 May 2007. They were then stationed in Camp Lejeune, NC to begin training for upcoming Combat Operations in Al Anbar, Iraq. 3/23 and all supporting units deployed to Haditha, Iraq, in late September 2007, conducting Counter-IED Operations, patrols, convoys, raids, and basic Support and Stability Operations throughout Haditha and surrounding Al Anbar areas until April 2008, when they returned to the United States and demobilized.

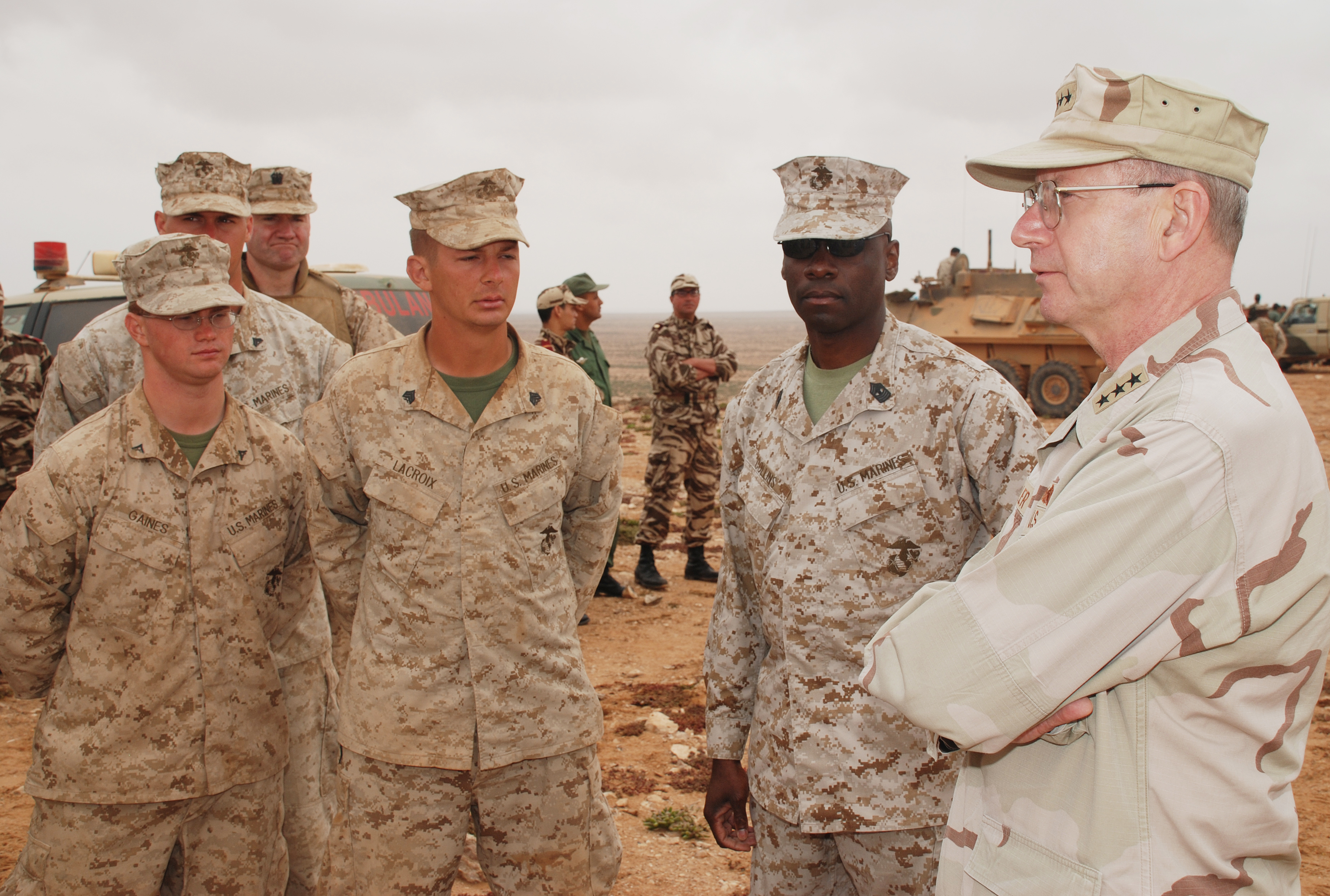
Vice Adm. Robert T. Moeller (right), U.S. Africa Command deputy to the commander for military operations, has a conversation with Marines from Weapons Company, 3rd Battalion, 23rd Marine Regiment, based out of Baton Rouge, La., prior to the start of the final training exercise of AFRICAN LION 2009. The annually scheduled, combined U.S. -Moroccan exercise is designed to improve interoperability and mutual understanding of each nation's tactics, techniques and procedures.

==== Africa in 2009 ====
3/23 deployed to Morocco and the Republic of Benin, West Africa, during May and June 2009 for annual training. They participated in Exercise African Lion and Shared Accord 2009. The mission of the Marine Corps, under command of Marine Forces Africa (United States Africa Command), was to provide security for humanitarian operations and train side-by-side with their Moroccan counterparts, the Royal Moroccan Armed Forces, and the Republic of Benin Armed Forces. Exercise African Lion is an annually scheduled, joint, combined U.S.-Moroccan exercise. It brings together nearly 2,000 U.S. service members from locations throughout Europe and North America with more than 900 members of the Royal Moroccan Armed Forces. It is the largest exercise within the U.S. Africa Command area of responsibility, and is designed to promote interoperability and mutual understanding of each nation's military tactics, techniques and procedures.

=== Hurricane Katrina ===
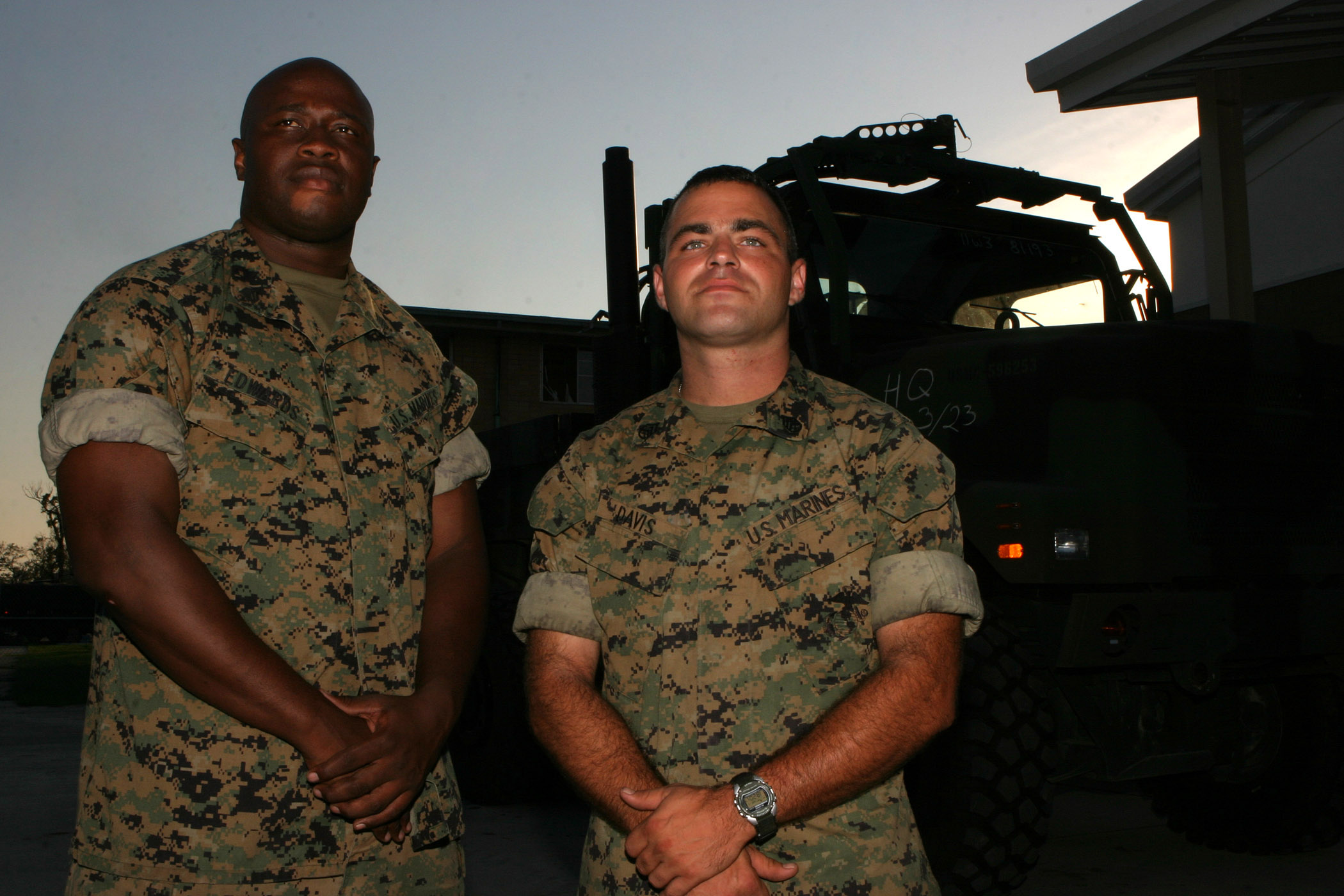
Sgt. Lorenzo L. Edwards (left) and Staff Sgt. Matthew J. Davis, both from 3rd Battalion, 23rd Marine Regiment, volunteered to stay behind at the 3/23 emergency operations center during Hurricane Katrina. 3/23 Marines supported area clean ups, relief convoys and assisted the 24th Marine Expeditionary Unit Command Element (2005)

The headquarters for 3rd Battalion, 23rd Marine Regiment, was caught in the middle of Hurricane Katrina in late 2005. The majority of the battalions members were authorized to provide security for their families and leave the immediate area. A contingent of Marines from 3/23 volunteered to stay behind and assist the local community, as well as act as a liaison for the 24th Marine Expeditionary Unit, who was deployed to the region to assist with disaster relief.

== Notable former members ==
- Private First Class Clinton M. Adcock, Navy Cross
- Private First Class Josiah Scott Bell, Navy Cross
- Private First Class Douglas T. Jacobson, Medal of Honor
- Howard Johnson, killed in action during the Battle of Iwo Jima
- Jamey Johnson
- Frank Gambino, Navy Cross
- Gunnery Sergeant Addies S. McGinn Jr., Navy Cross
- John H. Yancey, circa 1946–1950

== Awards ==
- Presidential Unit Citation (World War II)(I MEF Iraq 2003)
- Navy Unit Commendation with three Bronze Stars (World War II, Desert Storm, II MEF Iraq 2007)
- National Defense Medal with two Bronze Stars (World War II, Desert Storm, War on Terror)
- Asiatic-Pacific Campaign Medal with 4 Arrowheads (World War II)
- World War II Victory Medal
- Navy Meritorious Unit Commendation 1990–91
- Southwest Asia Service Medal with two Bronze Stars (Desert Shield, Desert Storm)
- Global War on Terrorism Expeditionary Medal (Iraq 2003)
- Global War on Terrorism Service Medal
- Iraq Campaign Medal with three Bronze Stars (2003–2008)
- Kuwait Liberation (Saudi Arabia)
- Kuwait Liberation (Kuwait)
- Combat Action Ribbon (Desert Storm)
- Navy Sea Service Deployment Ribbon (Desert Storm, Afghanistan)
- Afghanistan Campaign Medal with one Bronze Star (2018)
- Joint Meritorious Unit Citation (Afghanistan)

== See also ==
- List of United States Marine Corps battalions
- Organization of the United States Marine Corps
- 23rd Marine Regiment (United States)
- Headquarters Company 23rd Marines (HQ/23) – San Bruno, California
- 1st Battalion, 23rd Marines (1/23) – Ellington Field, Texas
- 2nd Battalion, 23rd Marines (2/23) – Pasadena, California
- 2nd Battalion, 24th Marines (2/24) – Chicago, Illinois
- Truck Company 23rd Marines – Nellis Air Force Base, Nevada
- Combat Logistics Battalion 23 formerly 4th Landing Support Battalion (aka the 4th Pioneers)
- Naval Mobile Construction Battalion 133
- Seabees
