= 1st Battalion, 23d Marines =

Infantry battalion of the United States Marine Corps

1st Battalion, 23rd Marines
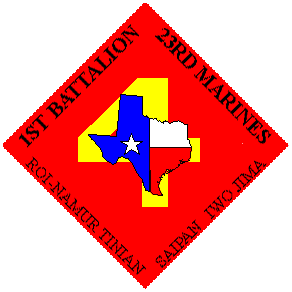
- 1st Battalion, 23rd Marines insignia
- Active: 1942
- Country: United States of America
- Branch: United States Marine Corps
- Type: Infantry Battalion
- Role: Locate, close with and destroy the enemy with fire and maneuver
- Size: 1000
- Part of: 23rd Marine Regiment; 4th Marine Division
- Garrison/HQ: Houston, Texas
- Nickname: "Lone Star"
- Anniversaries: 10 November 1775 Birthday of the Marine Corps
- Engagements: World War II: Battle of Kwajalein; Battle of Saipan; Battle of Tinian; Battle of Iwo Jima; Gulf War: Operation Desert Storm; War on terror: Operation Enduring Freedom; Operation Iraqi Freedom

Commanders
- Current commander: LtCol Andrew S. Abbott

1st Battalion, 23rd Marines (1/23) is one of 32 infantry battalions in the United States Marine Corps, and one of only eight battalions found in the United States Marine Corps Reserve. It is located throughout Texas and Louisiana consisting of approximately 1000 Marines and Sailors. They fall under the command of the 23rd Marine Regiment and the 4th Marine Division.

== Current units ==
Name	Location
Headquarters and Services Company	Houston, Texas
Alpha Company	Houston, Texas
Bravo Company	Bossier City, Louisiana
Charlie Company	Corpus Christi, Texas
Charlie Company (Det)	Harlingen, Texas
Weapons Company	Austin, Texas

== Mission ==
Provide trained combat and combat support personnel, and units to augment and reinforce the active component in time of war, national emergency, and at other times as national security requires; and have the capability to reconstitute the Division, if required.

== History ==
=== World War II ===
The battalion was activated on 20 November 1942, at Marine Corps Base Camp Pendleton, California.

- They participated in the Battle of Kwajalein (Roi and Namur) where they landed as part of the initial assault on 31 January 1944. Their assault objectives were the heavily defended Japanese occupied twin islands of Roi-Namur in the Kwajalein Atoll of the Marshall Islands in the Central Pacific. Roi-Namur were two tiny islands in the northern part of the atoll. It was the site of major Japanese three-runway airbase. 23rd Marines attacked Roi while the 24th Marines landed on Namur. The regiment secured Roi by the evening.

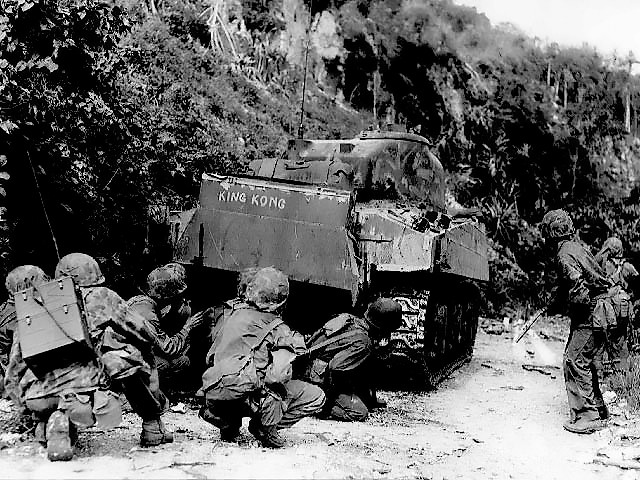
Marines take cover behind a M4 Sherman tank while cleaning out the northern north end of the island of Saipan. July 8, 1944

- The Battalion's next action came at the Battle of Saipan which began on 15 June 1944. Their transport there was APA 35 the USS Calloway. Saipan was the linchpin in the Japanese defense of the Central Pacific. To make an amphibious assault even more difficult, it had several towns and a civilian population of about 20,000. Using the lessons learned at Roi-Namur, intensive pre-invasion naval bombardments and air strikes on Japanese positions began on 11 June 1944. Marines came ashore and were immediately met with intense and accurate fire from Japanese mortars, howitzers and antiboat guns. By 17 June 1944 a beachhead had been secured and on 18 June the Marines captured Aslito Airfield cutting Japanese defenses in two. The forces had to fight back a fierce Japanese counterattack in the form of banzai charges. For Siapan the 23rd landed on beaches blue 1 & 2. Shore party for 1/23 was the third battalion 20th Marines which was the 121st Seabees. The 4th Marine Division completed mopping up on Saipan on 16 July 1944 leaving only a week for preparation for the invasion of Tinian.
- The Invasion of Tinian commenced on 25 July 1944. The 4th Marine Division was selected to lead the assault on Tinian. Again, the pre-invasion bombardment built to a crescendo as H-hour approached. Assault elements met only limited small arms fire when they reached the beach. With nightfall, came the expected Japanese counterattacks. The division employed flame throwers, demolition charges and automatic weapons fire to route Japanese soldiers out of caves, bunkers, and other defensive positions on the southern portion of the island. One of the most difficult aspects of the final phase of battle was convincing Japanese soldiers and thousands of civilians to surrender.

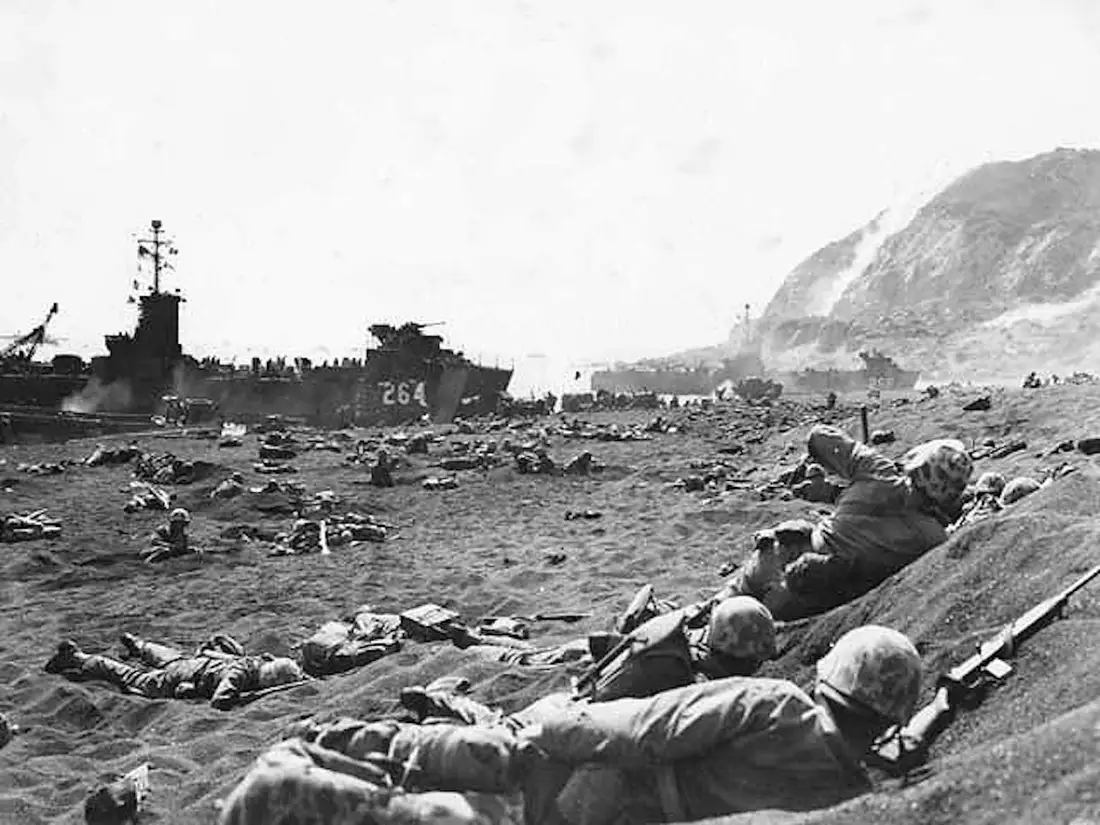
Marines burrow in the volcanic sand on the beach of Iwo Jima, as their comrades unload supplies and equipment from landing vessels despite the heavy rain of artillery fire from enemy positions in the background.

- The final combat action for 1/23 would come during the Battle of Iwo Jima. Iwo Jima was only 750 miles from Tokyo and was a major objective on the way to the Japanese mainland. The Japanese were painfully aware of the strategic importance of Iwo Jima and had prepared extensive and formidable defenses with a network of miles of caves and tunnels. The tunnels were in the islands black volcanic rocky base well protected from preinvasion naval and air bombardment. The 4th Marine Division landed in the first assault wave on 19 February 1945 . The 23rd and 24th Marine Regiments led the division's assault with 1/23 being the left Assault Battalion on yellow beach 1. They landed from APA 158 the USS Newberry. The 23rd Marines were ordered to seize the Motoyama Airfield #1 for the 133rd Seabees to get operational. High seas, heavy surf and loose volcanic soil made movement off the beaches difficult. By 20 February 1945, 23rd Marines had made good progress towards capturing the airfield. With the exception of a few remaining small pockets of resistance, the division had defeated the resolute and entrenched enemy in its zone of action in twenty days at a cost of nearly 50 percent combat efficiency. The 23rd did not have a Pioneer Battalion for the assault so the Seabees of the 133rd Naval Construction Battalion were attached to the 23rd and assigned that job. A Co. 133 was Shore Party to 1/23 until relieved on D-plus 18 by the Army Garrison Shore Party.

=== Gulf War ===
The battalion was mobilized for the first time since World War II in January 1991 in support of Operation Desert Shield. The unit was deployed to Marine Corps Base Camp Pendleton, California, in support of the 1st Marine Division during this time.

=== Global war on terror ===
Operation Enduring Freedom(January 2002-January 2003) Elements of the battalion were activated after the 11 September attacks. Bravo Company and attachments from Alpha Company's Weapons platoon were deployed to Guantanamo Bay, Cuba, where they provided perimeter security for the base.

Operation Iraqi Freedom (June 2004) The battalion was again mobilized in June 2004 to conduct three months of pre-deployment training at the Marine Corps Air Ground Combat Center Twentynine Palms, California, in preparation for their upcoming deployment in support of Operation Iraqi Freedom. The battalion arrived in Iraq, relieving 2nd Battalion, 7th Marines in late August 2004. They augmented the 7th Marine Regiment, helping to secure the area spanning the Hit-Haditha corridor, west of Ramadi, out to the Syrian border of the Al Anbar Province. Initial assignments for the battalion's companies in Iraq saw assignments in Ar-Rutbah, Al Asad Airbase and Hit. The battalion returned from Iraq in late March 2005, having been relieved by 3rd Battalion, 25th Marines.

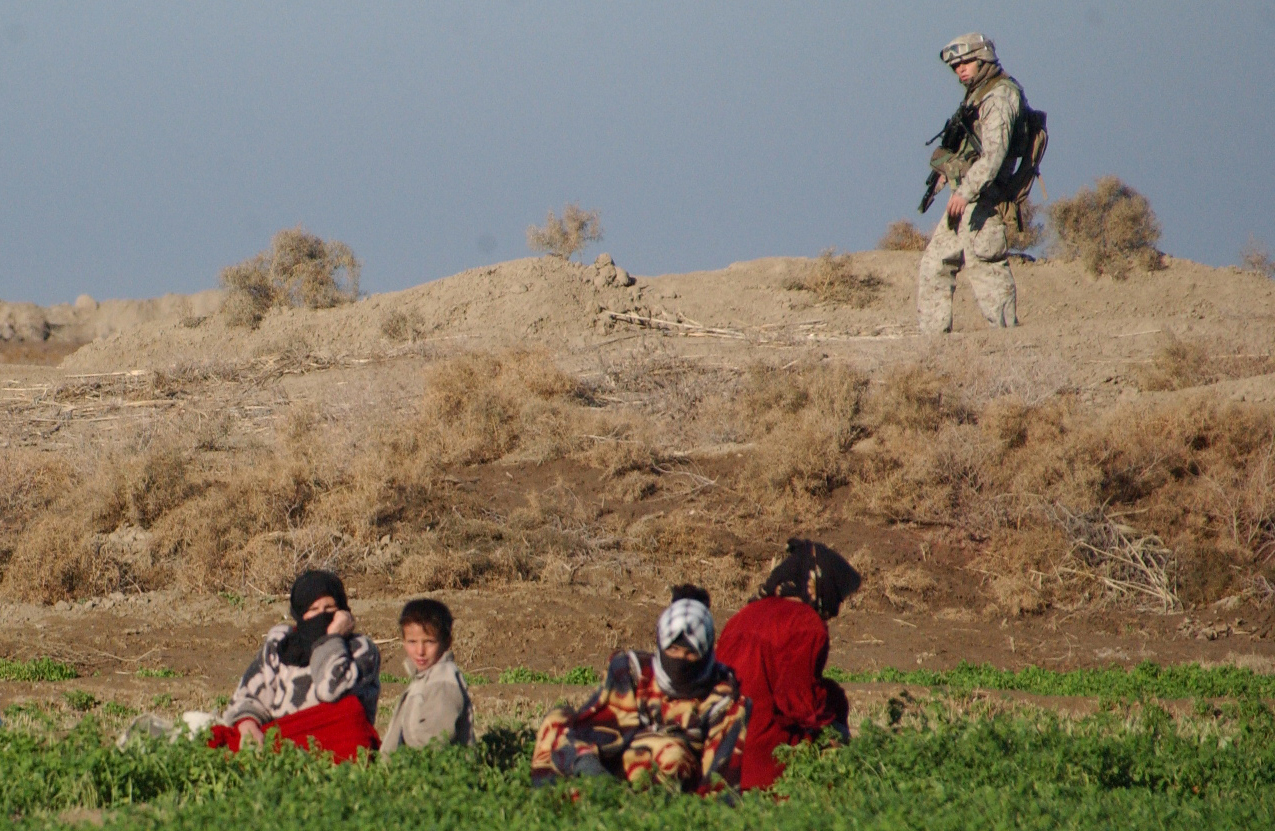
Marine marches past local Iraqi civilians during a security patrol around Ramadi, Iraq, 2004

In May 2007, Marines that had not participated in the June 2004 mobilization were tasked to support 3rd Battalion, 23rd Marines in their upcoming activation. Volunteers from the first mobilization were also part of this support. These Marines were deployed back to the Al Anbar Province and conducted operations near and around the Haditha Dam.

Operation Enduring Freedom (Afghanistan) (November 2010 - December 2011)

About 800 marines and navy corpsmen departed in November 2010 for pre-deployment training at Camp Pendleton in California. The 1/23 Marines deployed in March 2011 in support of II Marine Expeditionary Force in southwestern Afghanistan. The battalion mobilized for about 400 days, with seven months spent in Afghanistan. Alpha Company supported Regimental Combat Team 8 in the upper Sangin Valley and then transitioned to its own battle space in and around Camp Delaram II in the northwest part of Helmand province. Alpha Company also led a mission that confiscated more than 150 tons of poppy seed, marking the largest drug seizure by NATO forces in Afghanistan. Bravo Company supported RCT-1 (Regimental Combat Team 1) in the southern portion of Helmand province. Charlie, Weapons and Headquarters and Service Companies were employed in several endeavors. These companies ran the Combat Operations Center at the Camp Leatherneck, Bastion and Shorabak complex and partnered with other coalition forces to make vast improvements to the security of the area.

The battalion officially handed responsibility over a wide variety of operations in Afghanistan to the Massachusetts-based 1st Battalion 25th Marines during a transfer of authority ceremony on 13 September 2011.

Security cooperation team Jordan (SCT-J) 2020-2021

Elements of the battalion where deployed to support NATO efforts in Afghanistan, training and advising the 23rd Georgian infantry battalion (gib) but were remission to Jordan to train and advise various units throughout the country.

== Medal of Honor recipients ==
- Joseph William Ozbourn, USMCR, Co B, 1st Battalion, 23d Marines, 4th Marine Division, 30 July 1944, Tinian Island, Mariana Islands
- Darrell Samuel Cole, USMCR, Co B, 1st Battalion, 23d Marines, 4th Marine Division, 19 February 1945, Iwo Jima

== Unit awards ==
A unit citation or commendation is an award bestowed upon an organization for the action cited. Members of the unit who participated in said actions are allowed to wear on their uniforms the awarded unit citation. Awards and decorations of the United States Armed Forces have different categories: i.e. Service, Campaign, Unit, and Valor. Unit awards are distinct from personal decorations. 1/23 has been presented with the following awards:

Ribbon	Unit Award
	Presidential Unit Citation
	American Defense Service Medal with one Bronze Star
	Asiatic-Pacific Campaign Medal with 4 Arrowheads
	World War II Victory Medal
	National Defense Service Medal with three Bronze Stars
	Navy Meritorious Unit Commendation 1990-91
	Navy Unit Commendation Desert Storm, II
	Iraq Campaign Medal
	Global War on Terrorism Expeditionary Medal
	Global War on Terrorism Service Medal

Navy Unit Commendation and Afghanistan Campaign Medal

== See also ==
- List of United States Marine Corps battalions
- Organization of the United States Marine Corps
- 23rd Marine Regiment (United States)
- Headquarters Company 23d Marines (HQ/23) - San Bruno, California
- 2nd Battalion, 23rd Marines (2/23) - Pasadena, California
- 3rd Battalion, 23rd Marines (3/23) - Bridgeton, Missouri
- 2nd Battalion, 24th Marines (2/24) - Chicago, Illinois
- Truck Company 23rd Marines - Nellis Air Force Base, Nevada
- Combat Logistics Battalion 23 formerly 4th Landing Support Battalion (aka the 4th Pioneers)
- Naval Mobile Construction Battalion 133
- Seabees
