= 2nd Battalion, 23d Marines =

2nd Battalion, 23rd Marines
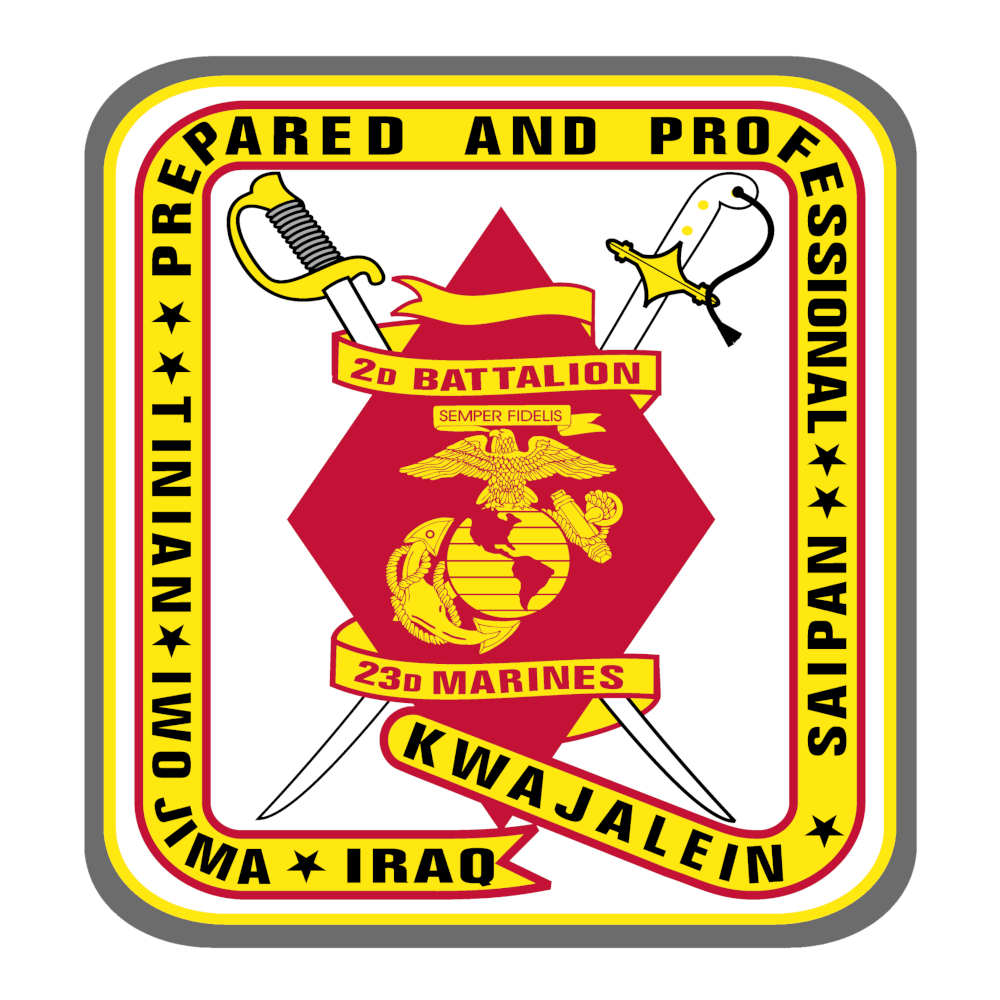
- 2nd Battalion, 23rd Marines insignia
- Active: Early 1920s
- Country: United States of America
- Branch: United States Marine Corps
- Type: Infantry battalion
- Role: Locate, close with and destroy the enemy by fire and maneuver, or to repel the enemy’s assault by fire and close combat.
- Size: 1000
- Part of: 23rd Marine Regiment; 4th Marine Division
- Garrison/HQ: Pasadena, California
- Nickname: Marshall
- Mottos: "Prepared and Professional"
- Engagements: World War II: Battle of Kwajalein; Battle of Saipan; Battle of Tinian; Battle of Iwo Jima; Operation Desert Storm; Global War on Terror: Operation Iraqi Freedom; Operation Enduring Freedom

Commanders
- Current commander: LtCol Michael P. Smith
- Notable commanders: Lewis C. Hudson

2nd Battalion, 23rd Marines (2/23) is a reserve infantry battalion in the United States Marine Corps located throughout the Western United States consisting of approximately 1000 Marines and Sailors. They fall under the command of the 23rd Marine Regiment and the 4th Marine Division.

== Current Units ==
Name	Location
Headquarters and Services Company	Pasadena, California
Echo Company	San Bruno, California
Fox Company	Las Vegas, Nevada & Salt Lake City, Utah
Golf Company	Seal Beach, California
Weapons Company	Seal Beach, California

== Previous Units ==
Name	Location
Delta Company	Los Alamitos, California

== Mission ==
Provide trained combat personnel and units to augment and reinforce the active component in time of war, national emergency, and at other times as national security requires.

== History ==
=== World War II ===
Activated on 20 July 1942 at New River, North Carolina, 23rd Marines was assigned to the 4th Marine Division in February 1943 and relocated during July 1943 to Camp Pendleton, California. 23rd Marines participated in the following campaigns during World War II: Kwajalein, Saipan, Tinian, and Iwo Jima.

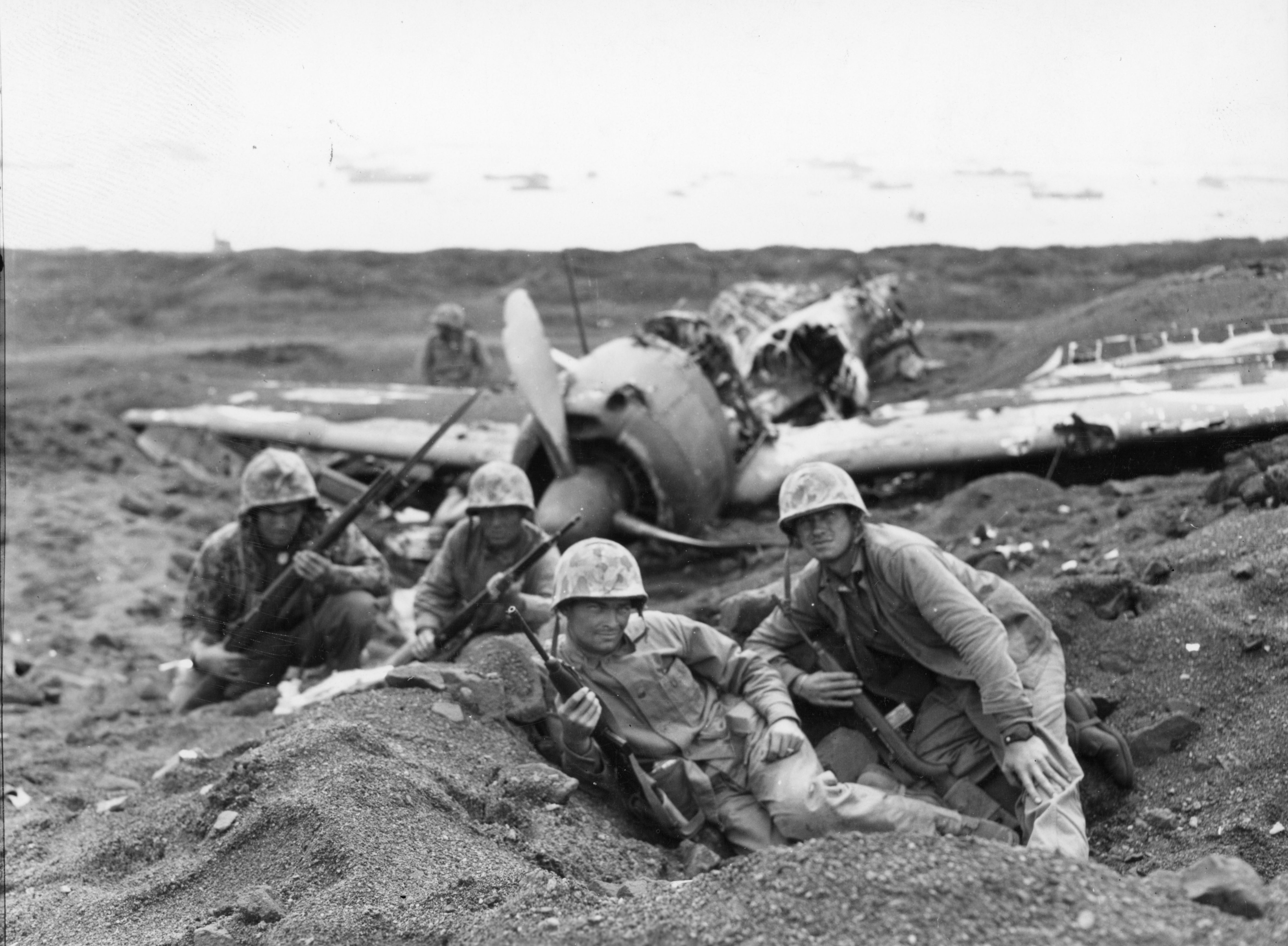
First Lieutenant Arthur Carley, Company E, 2nd Battalion, 23rd Marine Regiment, finds shelter for his platoon near a wrecked Zero on Iwo Jima. 23 February 1945

For Saipan the 23rd landed on beaches blue 1 & 2. Shore party for 2/23 was the third battalion 20th Marines which was the 121st Seabees.

For Iwo Jima 2/23 was the right Assault Battalion on yellow beach. They landed from APA 207 the USS Mifflin on yellow beach 2. The 23rd did not have a Pioneer Battalion so the 133rd Seabees were attached to the Regiment in that assignment. B Co. 133 NCB was Shore Party for 2/23 until relieved on D-plus 18.

During the fierce fighting which occurred in the Pacific Theater, four Marines of the 23rd Marine Regiment were awarded the Medal of Honor. In October 1945, the Regiment was again relocated to Camp Pendleton and was subsequently deactivated on 15 November 1945.

For its actions against enemy forces, 23rd Marines received the following awards: Presidential Unit Citation Streamer with one Bronze Star, Asia-Pacific Campaign Streamer with four Bronze Stars, and World War II Victory Streamer.

=== Vietnam ===
On 1 July 1962 2/23 was reactivated, reassigned to the 4th Marine Division and relocated to Santa Monica, California on property adjacent to the Santa Monica Airport. As a Marine Corps Reserve unit during Vietnam era, the battalion's weekend drills and annual two week training were often held at Marine Corps Base Camp Pendleton as well as other Southern California military installations that included Twentynine Palms, Coronado, and Port Hueneme.

In January, 1973 the battalion again relocated this time to Encino, California.

=== Gulf War ===
Six Marines were activated in late November 1990 from Fox Company in Salt Lake City, Utah. They left within five days to join 3rd Battalion, 23rd Marines whose headquarters is in the New Orleans, Louisiana area. From there they proceeded to Marine Corps Base Camp Lejeune for preparation before deploying to Al Jabail, Saudi Arabia. They proceeded into Kuwait where their final location was Hill 99, just outside Kuwait City. They were released from active duty in May 1991 and returned home.

In December 1990, 2nd Battalion, 23rd Marines was mobilized by presidential call-up to serve on active duty 99.2% of those on the rolls reported to their seven separate drill centers for duty. Within two days of activation, this, the largest and most geographically diverse infantry battalion in the Marine Corps, reported to Camp Pendleton, California with 1,015 Marine and Navy personnel. Unlike the standard 180-day forming and training period which most battalions require to prepare for deployment, 2/23 deployed within 16 days of activation and joined III MEF on 25 December 1990 in Okinawa, Japan.

=== Global war on terror ===
After the terrorist attacks on 11 September 2001, 2nd Battalion, 23rd Marines was activated initially for one year to respond to any additional terrorist attacks that might occur in the United States. Just before its one-year deactivation date, the battalion's active duty status was extended in order for the unit to deploy to the Middle East to participate in the Iraq War. 2nd Battalion, 23rd Marines was the first complete infantry reserve battalion to deploy in support of the Iraq War.

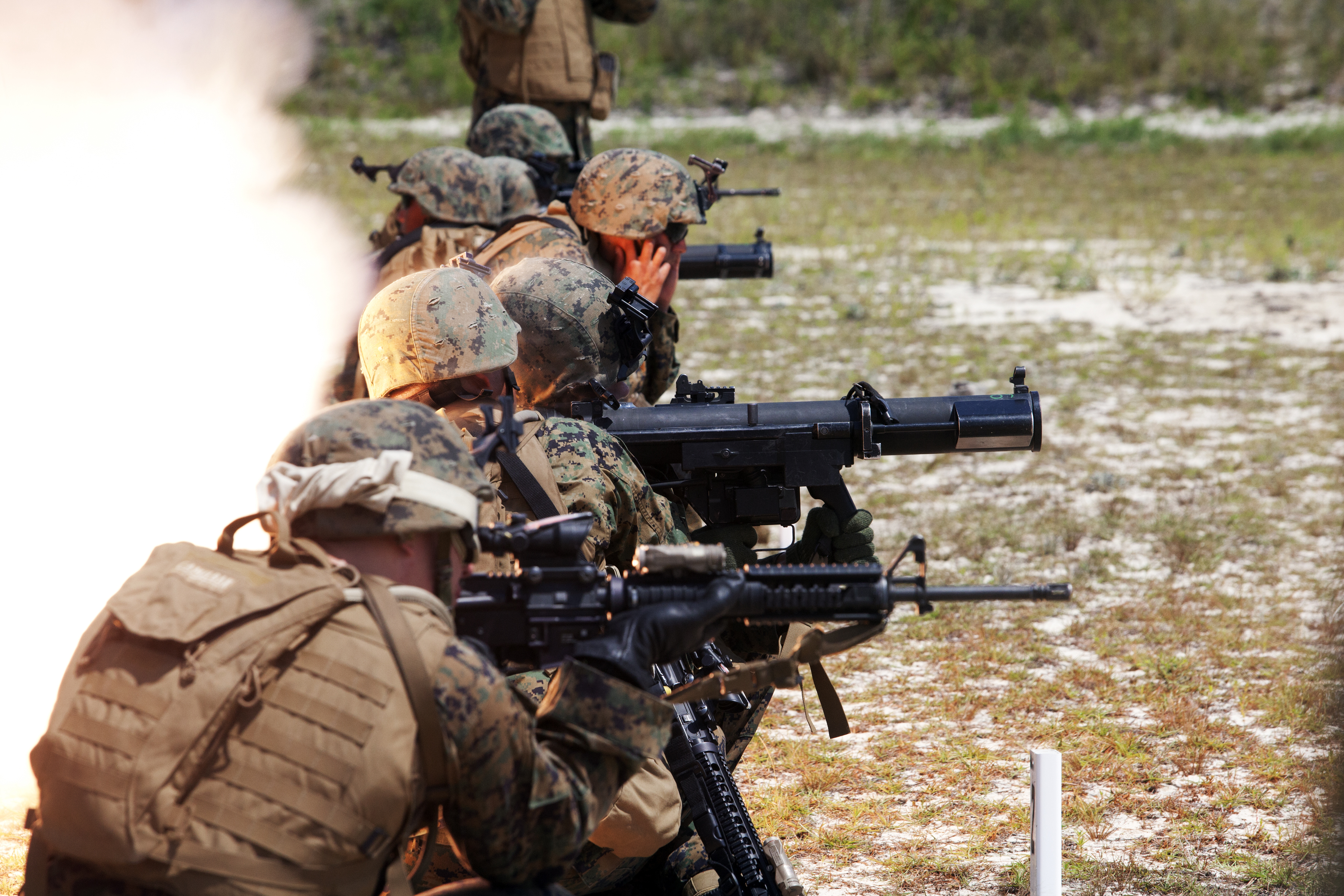
U.S. Marines from 2nd Battalion, 23rd Marine Regiment fire a Mk 153 Shoulder-Launched Multipurpose Assault Weapon during UNITAS-Partnership of the Americas 2012 at Camp Blanding

2/23 pushed forward into Iraq on 20 March 2003. Among other locations, the battalion fought in An Nasiriyah with Task Force Tarawa's operations in that area after a U.S. Army convoy was ambushed and several soldiers were taken prisoner by insurgent forces. The battalion moved up Route 17 as part of Regimental Combat Team 1 (RCT-1) fighting in Al Gharraf and Al Fajr among other towns. The battalion suffered its only combat fatality in Al Fajr. The battalion continued north with RCT 1 and was part of the tactical feint at Al Kut. Ultimately traveling west to An Numaniyah where the 1st Marine Division crossed the Tigris River. A few days later, on 8 April 2003, the battalion entered Baghdad with the Division. Fox Company found itself engaged in combat with approximately 200 Fedayeen and Iraqi intelligence personnel. A scout sniper attached to Fox company, Sergeant Scott Montoya, was awarded Navy Cross for "extraordinary heroism in combat" during this engagement. The next day Golf company moved to secure the Iraqi intelligence headquarters from which Fox Company had been attacked the previous day. Once Baghdad was largely secure, Golf Company and an anti-tank section from Weapons Company became part of Task Force Tripoli, which was the Marine vanguard into Tikrit.

On 1 December 2008, 2nd Battalion, 23rd Marines, were activated for the Iraq War. They deployed in and around the city of Ar Ramadi. The battalion was one of the last participating Marine infantry force. With over 300 missions successfully completed 2/23 completed their deployment. Weapons company successfully completed missions out of Al-Taqaddum Air Base where they were part of the quick reaction force. During their deployment, elements were forward deployed to Afghanistan in support of Operation Enduring Freedom.

In June of 2010, the battalion received NATO orders to Estonia. The battalion participated in BALTOPS and conducted training with Estonian Forces in preparation for their upcoming deployment to Afghanistan.

On 1 March 2011, the battalion was forward deployed as part of Operation Enduring Freedom. The unit was integrated into the 4th Marine Regiment as Alpha Company. Elements were forward deployed in Okinawa, Southeast Asia, South Korea, Thailand, Indonesia, Malaysia, and Singapore. Other combat elements forward deployed received hostile fire/hostile fire pay. The unit returned home in September of 2011.

Elements were later deployed as augmentees to Afghanistan with other elements of 2/23 forward deployed as part of the Georgia Deployment Program and Black Sea Rotational Force.

In November of 2015, a company sized element from the battalion was tasked to participate in UNITAS 2015 in Brazil. The element conducted training with nations from all across the globe.

During this time, a new Marine Corps distance record for Osprey flights in the Western Hemisphere was set. The Ospreys traveled over 6,165 miles from Marine Corps Air Station Miramar to Rio de Janeiro.

=== Post-Global War on Terror ===
The 2nd Battalion, 23rd Marine Regiment was activated and deployed to Okinawa in October of 2018 as part of Unit Deployment Program (UDP) 19.1. The battalion participated in Operation Forest Light 19.1 and conducted training with Japanese Self Defense Forces.

A company sized element was tasked to the Korean Demilitarized Zone between the border of North and South Korea. The element conducted operations, participated in the Korean Marine Exercise Program, and received the Korea Defense Service Medal during this period.

A company sized element was tasked to the Philippines and conducted exercises with the Philippine Marine Corps.

The battalion returned home and were deactivated in April of 2019.

In November of 2024, the battalion again activated in support of Unit Deployment Program 25.1.

== Unit Awards ==
2/23 has received several unit citations and commendations. Members who participated in actions that merited the award are authorized to wear the medal or ribbon on their uniforms. Awards and decorations of the United States Armed Forces fall into different categories: i.e. Service, Campaigns, Unit, and Valor. Unit awards are distinct from personal decorations. The following are 2/23's Unit Awards:

- Presidential Unit Citation Iwo Jima, Operation Iraqi Freedom
- National Defense Medal
- Global War on Terrorism Service Medal Operation Iraqi/Enduring Freedom
- Global War on Terrorism Expeditionary Medal Operation Iraqi/Enduring Freedom
- Iraq Campaign Medal Operation Iraqi Freedom
- Navy Unit Commendation Tinian, Desert Storm, II MEF Iraq 2007
- Asiatic-Pacific Campaign Medal with 4 Arrowheads (World War II)
- World War II Victory Medal
- Navy Meritorious Unit Commendation 1990-91, 2017

== See also ==
- List of United States Marine Corps battalions
- Organization of the United States Marine Corps
- 4th Marine Division (United States)
- 23rd Marine Regiment
- Headquarters Company 23d Marines (HQ/23) - San Bruno, California
- 1st Battalion, 23rd Marines (1/23) - Ellington Field, Texas
- 3rd Battalion, 23rd Marines (3/23) - Bridgeton, Missouri
- 2nd Battalion, 24th Marines (2/24) - Chicago, Illinois
- Truck Company 23rd Marines - Nellis Air Force Base, Nevada
- Combat Logistics Battalion 23 formerly 4th Landing Support Battalion (aka the 4th Pioneers)
- Naval Mobile Construction Battalion 133
- Seabees
