= 4th Landing Support Battalion =

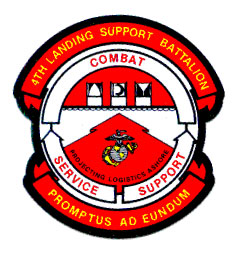
- 4th LSB insignia
- Active: 1924 – 7 September 2013
- Country: United States
- Branch: USMC
- Part of: 4th Marine Logistics Group
- Garrison/HQ: Joint Base Lewis-McChord, Washington
- Nickname: "Red Patchers"
- Motto: Promptus Ad Eundum ("Willing to Go")
- Engagements: Operation Desert Storm; Operation Iraqi Freedom; World War II

Commanders
- Notable commanders: LtCol David L Brooks USMCR (final commander)

4th Landing Support Battalion (4th LSB) was a Military Landing Support battalion of the United States Marine Corps Reserve. The unit was based out of New Orleans, LA (A Co.), Savannah, GA (B Co.), and Charleston, SC (C Co), and fell under the command of the 4th Marine Logistics Group (4th MLG). The battalion has been decommissioned.

== Mission ==
Support the Marine Air Ground Task Force (MAGTF). Combat Service Support moving people, supplies, and equipment by plane, rail, helicopter, and sea. Conduct Helicopter Support Teams (HSTs), Ship to shore operations, air delivery operations, rail transport.

== Table of organization - 4th Landing Support Battalion ==
- Headquarters and Service Company (Fort Lewis, Washington)
- Landing Support Company Alpha (New Orleans, Louisiana)
- Landing Support Company Bravo (Savannah, Georgia)
- Landing Support Company Charlie (Charleston, SC)

== History ==
The unit was first formed in Seattle, Washington in 1924 as the 11th Infantry Company, United States Marine Corps Reserve. In 1931, the unit was re-designated as the 11th Infantry Battalion, United States Marine Corps Reserve Organized. With the outbreak of worldwide hostilities in 1940 the battalion was mobilized and joined the 1st Battalion, 6th Marines for duty in Iceland.

On 24 August 1943 the Battalion was re-designated and activated as the 2nd Battalion, 20th Marines, (Engineers), 4th Marine Division. 28 February 1944 saw the battalion in action at Kwajalein and Majuro Atoll in the Marianas Islands. As 1943 progressed the unit participated in the assault and capture of both Saipan and Tinian. For its actions, the battalion was awarded the Presidential Unit Citation. The battalion was again re-designated on 1 September 1944 as the 4th Pioneer Battalion, 4th Marine Division and assigned to the 25th Regimental Combat Team as shore party for the assault on Iwo Jima. There the Battalion was awarded the Navy Unit Commendation. A Co, B Co, and C Co. were awarded the Presidential Unit Citation individually for being attached to Assault Battalions. On 31 March 1945, the 4th Pioneer Battalion re-deployed to San Diego, California. The battalion was awarded the Asiatic Pacific Campaign Streamer with four bronze stars and the World War II Victory Streamer for service throughout World WarII.

IWO JIMA In 1944 when the 4th Marine Division was preparing for the assault on Iwo Jima it had a single Pioneer Battalion, the 4th, which was assigned to the 25th RCT. 1/25 was to be the left assault battalion on blue beach 1 and Baker Co. was assigned to them. 3/25 was to be the right assault battalion on blue beach 2 and Charlie Co. was assigned to them. Dog Co. 133 Naval Construction Battalion was tasked to the 4th Pioneers as their reserve. The 133rd CB was chosen to be the shore party for the 23rd RCT on yellow beaches to fill the billet of deactivated 3rd Battalion 20th Marines. Able Co. 4th Pioneers was split and attached to A & B Companies 133rd CB on beaches yellow 1 and yellow 2. 1/23 was the left assault battalion on yellow 1 with A Co. 133, 2/23 was the right assault battalion on yellow 2. H-Hour was 0900 and the first shore parties were on the beach before 0930. For the next 18 days the Pioneers and Seabees worked together on yellow and blue beaches until they were relieved by the Army garrison shore party on D+18.

The battalion remained in San Diego until 31 October 1945 when it was deactivated. On 7 August 1945 the 4th Shore Party Battalion was reactivated in Seattle, Washington, and stationed at 7500 Sand Point Way, NE aboard the Naval Support Activity. During the next 31 years the battalion saw many small detachments deploy worldwide to include service in Korea and the Republic of Vietnam. On 17 December 1978, the unit remained in place in Seattle, Washington. In 1990, the 4th Shore Party Battalion was again called for service in Operations Desert Shield/Storm, and was awarded the Meritorious Unit Commendation.

In October 1993, the battalion grew in size as the Landing Support Equipment Company at Vienna, Ohio, was re-designated and assigned to the battalion. The 4th Landing Support Battalion moved to Fort Lewis, Washington in January 1995. The Naval and Marine Corps Training Center was officially dedicated during a ceremony on 3 March 1995.

In February 2003 and throughout 2004 many of the reserve units making up 4th Landing Support Battalion were called into active duty to support the start of Operation Iraq Freedom. The majority went over to Iraq to augment other Marine units as combat replacement troops, but primarily performed their trained role providing combat logistic support. Some stayed at Camp Pendleton forming the temporary Combat Service Support Company 147 (CSSC-147). CSSC-147 worked with other Marine units and branches of the military throughout Southern California in shipping supplies over to Iraq throughout most of 2003. Those who did not deploy with their units for various reasons still reported to their respected reserve unit location for service.

On 7 September 2013, 4th Landing Support Battalion conducted its official de-activation ceremony at the battalion headquarters on Joint Base Lewis McCord WA. That same day, Combat Logistics Battalion 23 officially uncased its colors for the first time. The newest CLB in the Marine Corps, CLB-23 is organized to echo its active duty counterparts within the USMC. Combat Logistics Battalion 23 (CLB-23) is headquartered at Fort Lewis, Washington

== Unit awards ==
A unit citation or commendation is an award bestowed upon an organization for the action cited. Members of the unit who participated in said actions are allowed to wear on their uniforms the awarded unit citation. Awards and decorations of the United States Armed Forces have different categories: i.e. Service, Campaign, Unit, and Valor. The 4th LSB has been presented with the following awards:

Ribbon	Battalion Unit Award	A Co Unit Award (inactive)	B Co Unit Award (inactive)	C Co Unit Award (inactive)
	Presidential Unit Citation with one Bronze Star	Presidential Unit Citation	Presidential Unit Citation	Presidential Unit Citation
	Navy Unit Commendation			
	Meritorious Unit Commendation			
	Asiatic-Pacific Campaign Streamer with four Bronze Stars			
	World War II Victory Streamer			
	National Defense Service Medal with three Bronze Stars			
	Southwest Asia Service Medal			
	Iraq Campaign Medal			
	Global War on Terrorism Expeditionary Medal			
	Global War on Terrorism Service Medal			

== See also ==
- List of United States Marine Corps battalions
- Organization of the United States Marine Corps
- Naval Mobile Construction Battalion 133
- 23rd Marine Regiment (United States) *** 1st Battalion 23rd Marines *** 2nd Battalion 23rd Marines *** 3rd Battalion 23rd Marines ***
- 25th Marine Regiment (United States)
