= Joseph W. Ozbourn =

United States Marine Corps Medal of Honor recipient

Joseph William Ozbourn
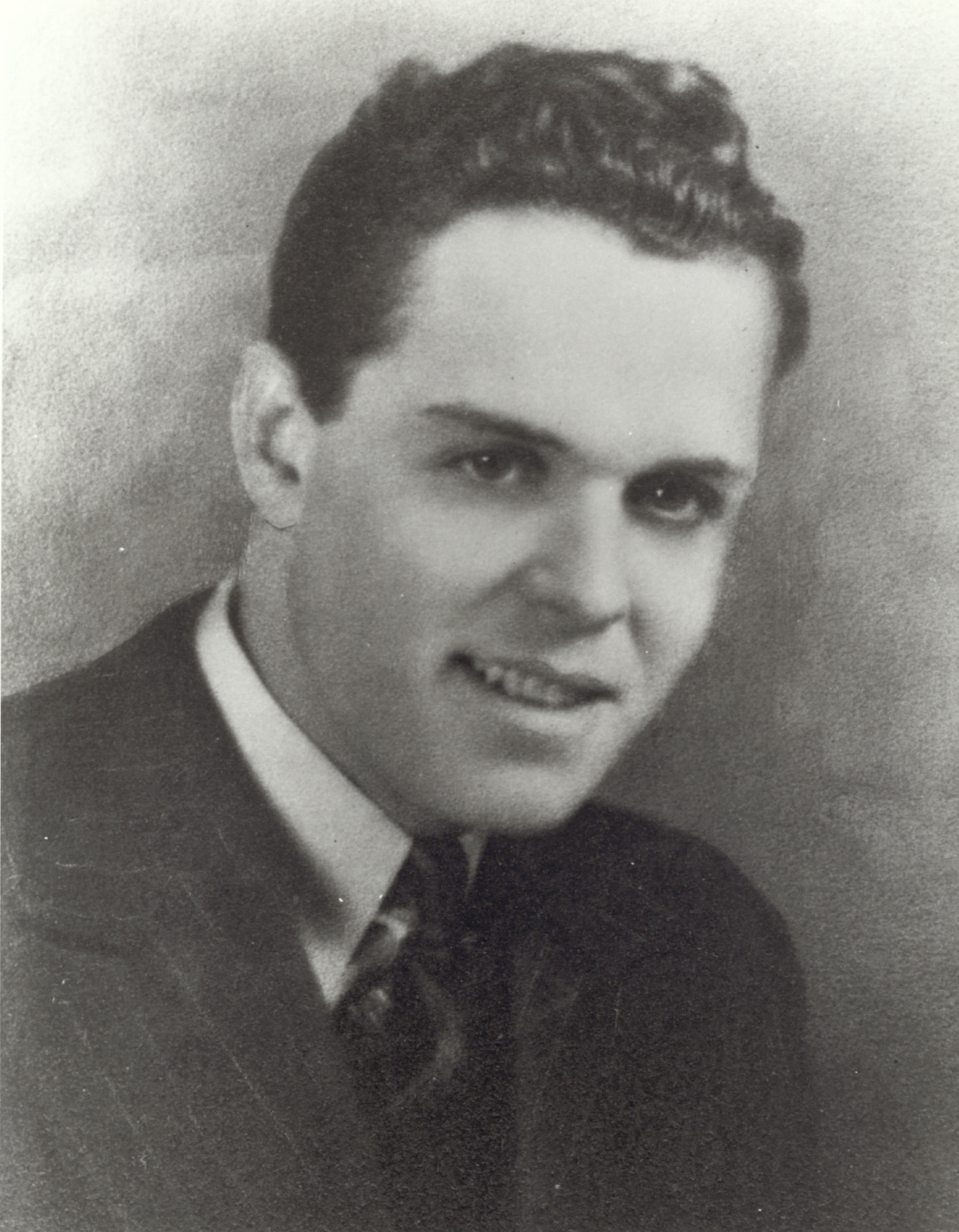
- Joseph W. Ozbourn, Medal of Honor recipient
- Born: October 24, 1919; Herrin, Illinois
- Died: July 30, 1944 (aged 24); Tinian, Northern Mariana Islands
- Burial place: National Memorial Cemetery of the Pacific, Honolulu, Hawaii
- Military career
- Allegiance: United States of America
- Branch: United States Marine Corps
- Service years: 1943–1944
- Rank: Private
- Unit: 1st Battalion, 23rd Marines
- Conflicts: World War II: Mariana and Palau Islands campaign; Battle of Tinian †
- Awards: Medal of Honor; Purple Heart

Private Joseph William Ozbourn (October 24, 1919 – July 30, 1944) was a United States Marine who posthumously received the Medal of Honor for sacrificing his life to save his comrades on Tinian in the Marianas on July 30, 1944.

== Biography ==
Joseph Ozbourn was born in Herrin, Illinois on October 24, 1919. He attended grammar school in Buckner, Illinois, and subsequently became a trip rider in the mines for the Old Ben Coal Corporation in West Frankfort, Illinois. He enlisted in the United States Marine Corps on October 30, 1943.

On July 30, 1944, while serving as a Browning Automatic Rifleman serving with the First Battalion, Twenty-Third Marines, Fourth Marine Division, during the Battle of Tinian, Private Ozbourn died after hurling himself on a live hand grenade thus saving the lives of four fellow Marines. For conspicuous gallantry and intrepidity, he was posthumously awarded the Medal of Honor.

Private Ozbourn was initially buried in Tinian, Mariana Islands, but later his remains were reinterred in the National Cemetery of the Pacific in Honolulu, Hawaii.

== Medal of Honor citation ==
The President of the United States takes pride in presenting the MEDAL OF HONOR posthumously to

PRIVATE JOSEPH W. OZBOURN
UNITED STATES MARINE CORPS RESERVE

for service as set forth in the following CITATION:

For conspicuous gallantry and intrepidity at the risk of his life above and beyond the call of duty as a Browning Automatic Rifleman serving with the First Battalion, Twenty-Third Marines, Fourth Marine Division, during the battle for enemy Japanese-held Tinian Island, Marianas Islands, 30 July 1944. As a member of a platoon assigned the mission of clearing the remaining Japanese troops from dugouts and pillboxes along a tree line, Private Ozbourn, flanked by two men on either side, was moving forward to throw an armed hand grenade into a dugout when a terrific blast from the entrance severely wounded the four men and himself. Unable to throw the grenade into the dugout and with no place to hurl it without endangering the other men, Private Ozbourn unhesitatingly grasped it close to his body and fell upon it, sacrificing his own life to absorb the full impact of the explosion but saving his comrades. His great personal valor and unwavering loyalty reflect the highest credit upon Private Ozbourn and the United States Naval service. He gallantly gave his life for his country.

/S/ FRANKLIN D. ROOSEVELT

== Awards and decorations ==

| 1st row | Medal of Honor | | |
| 2nd row | Purple Heart | Combat Action Ribbon | Presidential Unit Citation |
| 3rd row | American Campaign Medal | Asiatic-Pacific Campaign Medal with 2 Campaign stars | World War II Victory Medal |

== Namesake ==
The U.S. Navy's Gearing class destroyer USS Ozbourn, named in his honor, was christened by Ozbourn's widow on December 22, 1945, at the Bath Iron Works, Bath, Maine; and commissioned by Mrs. Ozbourn on March 5, 1946, at the Boston Naval Shipyard.

== See also ==
- List of Medal of Honor recipients
