= USS Mifflin =

1944 US Navy transport ship

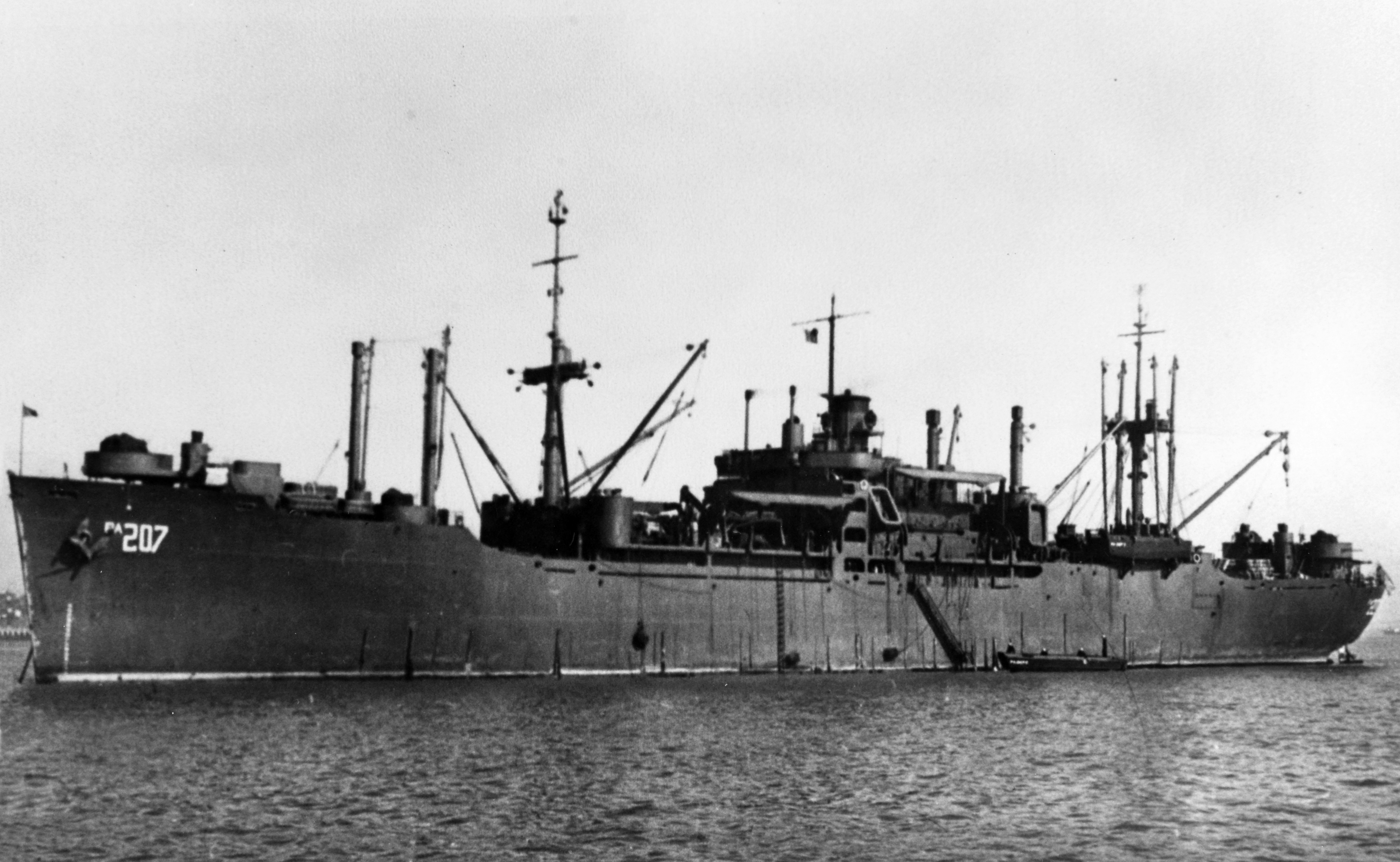
- Mifflin in 1945-46

History

United States
- Name: Mifflin
- Namesake: Mifflin County, Pennsylvania
- Ordered: as a Type VC2-S-AP5 hull, MCE hull 555
- Builder: Permanente Metals Corporation, Richmond, California
- Yard number: 555
- Laid down: 15 May 1944
- Launched: 7 August 1944
- Sponsored by: Alma De Bretteville Spreckles
- Commissioned: 11 October 1944
- Decommissioned: 5 July 1946
- Stricken: 1 October 1958
- Identification: Hull symbol: APA-207; Code letters: NPOH
- Honors and awards: 2 × battle stars for World War II service
- Fate: Sold for non-transportation use (NTU), 17 July 1975, delivered, 6 August 1975

General characteristics
- Class & type: Haskell-class attack transport
- Type: Type VC2-S-AP5
- Displacement: 6,873 long tons (6,983 t) (light load); 14,837 long tons (15,075 t) (full load)
- Length: 455 ft (139 m)
- Beam: 62 ft (19 m)
- Draft: 24 ft (7.3 m)
- Installed power: 2 × Combustion Engineering header-type boilers, 465 psi (3,210 kPa) 750 °F (399 °C); 8,500 shp (6,338 kW)
- Propulsion: 1 × Westinghouse geared turbine; 1 x propeller
- Speed: 17.7 kn (32.8 km/h; 20.4 mph)
- Boats & landing craft carried: 2 × LCMs; 1 × open LCPL; 18 × LCVPs; 2 × LCPRs; 1 × closed LCPL (Captain's Gig)
- Capacity: 2,900 long tons (2,900 t) DWT; 150,000 cu ft (4,200 m^{3}) (non-refrigerated)
- Troops: 87 officers, 1,475 enlisted
- Complement: 56 officers, 480 enlisted
- Armament: 1 × 5 in (127 mm)/38 caliber dual purpose gun; 1 × quad 40 mm (1.6 in) Bofors anti-aircraft (AA) gun mounts; 4 × twin 40mm Bofors (AA) gun mounts; 10 × single 20 mm (0.8 in) Oerlikon cannons AA mounts

Service record
- Part of: TransRon 15
- Operations: Assault and Occupation of Iwo Jima (19–25 February 1945); Assault and occupation of Okinawa Gunto (1–11 April 1945)
- Awards: American Campaign Medal; Asiatic–Pacific Campaign Medal; World War II Victory Medal; Navy Occupation Service Medal

USS Mifflin (APA-207) was a Haskell-class attack transport in service with the United States Navy from 1944 to 1946. She was scrapped in 1975.

== History ==
Mifflin was of the VC2-S-AP5 Victory ship design type and was named for Mifflin County, Pennsylvania. She was laid down 15 May 1944, under Maritime Commission (MARCOM) contract, MC hull 555, by Permanente Metals Corporation, Yard No. 2, Richmond, California; launched 7 August 1944; sponsored by Mrs. Alma De Brettville Sprecies; acquired from MARCOM on loan-charter; commissioned 11 October 1944.

=== Pacific War ===
After shakedown, Mifflin embarked 1,100 troops and sailed to Pearl Harbor. Exchanging her initial passengers for members of the 4th Marine Division, she continued amphibious exercises off Maui, until ordered to Saipan 27 January 1945.

==== Invasion of Iwo Jima ====
On 19 February, her boats landed the 2nd Battalion 23rd Marines and their Shore Party, B Co 133 NCB—4th Marine Division on beach "Yellow 2", Iwo Jima. She remained almost a week to offload priority, then request cargo, and to take on board battle casualties. This included her own, for the ship's beach party was hard hit the first day suffering 14 wounded and three missing. Mifflin also sustained a shell hit on her 40mm gun director before retiring with the wounded to Saipan on 28 February.

==== Invasion of Okinawa ====
Having replaced lost equipment and boats, she sailed 16 March, to nearby Tinian to practice for the invasion of Okinawa. In position for this last great assault, on 1 and 2 April, her boats feinted a landing of 2d Division Marines on the southeastern shore to lessen opposition to the main effort on the western beaches.

Again returning her Marines to Saipan, she remained until early June. Steaming to the New Hebrides, Mifflin loaded stores which she discharged 30 June, at Guam. Independence Day, she weighed anchor for San Francisco with a small passenger list and a need for repairs. Two months later, when she returned to the western Pacific to disembark 1,600 US Army replacement troops at Manila, Philippines, the war had ceased. Mifflin reloaded with men of the 33rd Infantry Division assigned to occupation duty and arrived Wakayama, Japan, 25 September. The next month, over 1,000 troops of the 24th Infantry Division were transported from Mindanao, Philippines, to Okajama, Japan. Sailing to Okinawa 30 October, she engaged in "Magic Carpet" duty from November to March 1946, returning additional thousands of veterans to San Francisco.

=== Decommissioning and fate ===
Inactivation soon began with Mifflin placed out of service in reserve 5 July 1946, assigned to the 19th Fleet, Stockton, California. Struck from the Naval Register 1 October 1958, she was returned to MARCOM the same day. Assigned to the National Defense Reserve Fleet, she was berthed as Suisun Bay, California, into 1969. She was sold under a "non-transportation use" (NTU) contract to West Waterway Lumber Company, 17 July 1975, for $128,009. She was transferred out of the fleet 6 August 1975.

== Awards ==
Mifflin received two battle stars for World War II service.

== Notes ==
Citations

== Bibliography ==
Online resources

- "Mifflin (APA-207)". Dictionary of American Naval Fighting Ships. Naval History and Heritage Command. 29 December 2015. This article incorporates text from this source, which is in the public domain.
- "Kaiser Permanente No. 2, Richmond CA". www.ShipbuildingHistory.com. 13 October 2010.
- "USS Mifflin (APA-207)". NavSource. 25 April 2014.
- "MIFFLIN (APA-207)". United States Department of Transportation. Archived from the original on 4 November 2016.
