= Douglas T. Jacobson =

United States Marine Corps Medal of Honor recipient

Douglas Thomas Jacobson
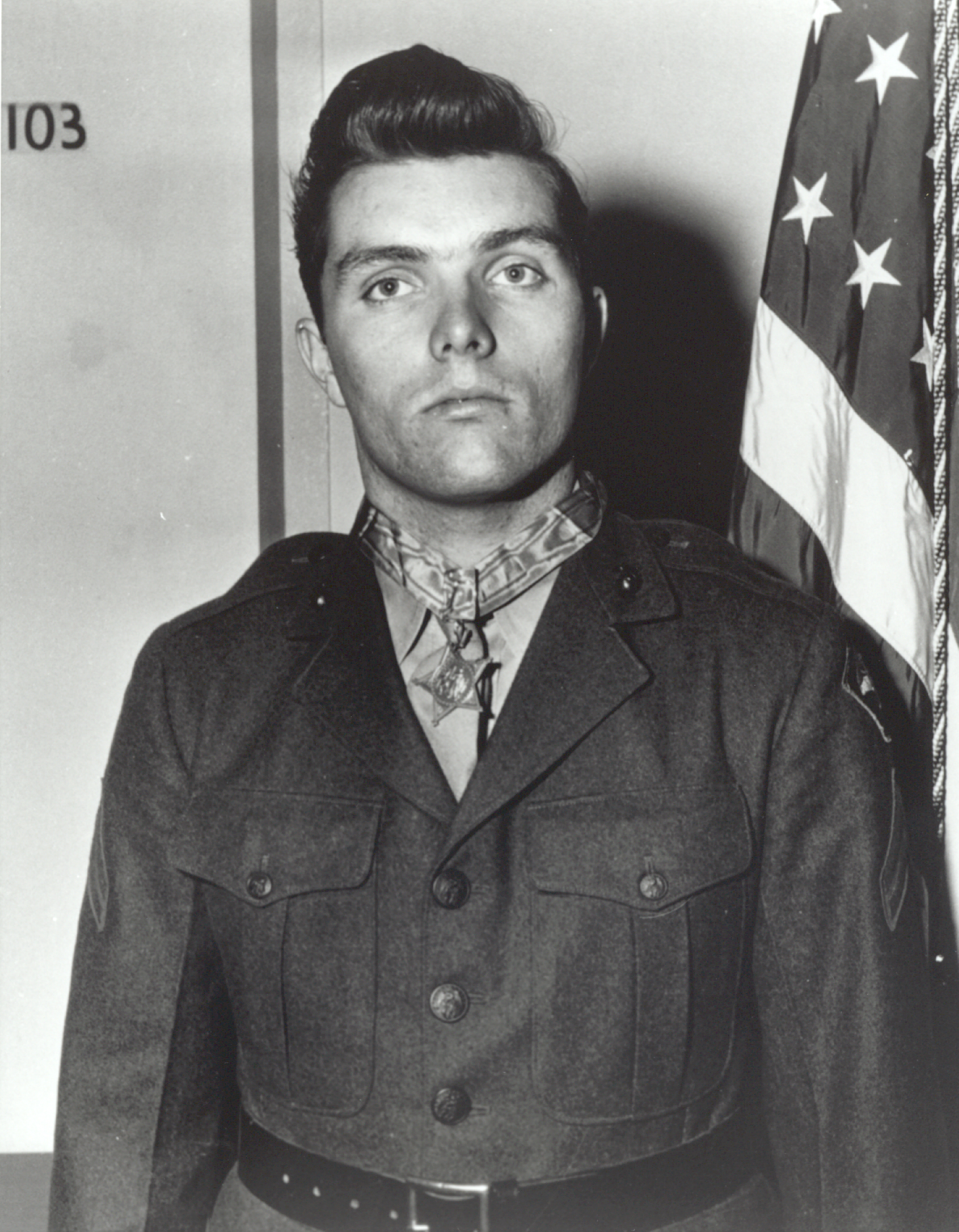
- Born: November 25, 1925; Rochester, New York
- Died: August 20, 2000 (aged 74); Port Charlotte, Florida
- Burial place: Arlington National Cemetery
- Military career
- Allegiance: United States of America
- Branch: United States Marine Corps
- Service years: 1943–1945, 1946–1949, 1953–1967
- Rank: Major
- Unit: 3rd Battalion 23rd Marines
- Conflicts: World War II; Battle of Iwo Jima
- Awards: Medal of Honor; Purple Heart

Major Douglas Thomas Jacobson (November 25, 1925 – August 20, 2000) was a United States Marine who earned the United States' highest military honor — the Medal of Honor — for his heroic actions on Iwo Jima during World War II. "Private First Class Jacobson destroyed a total of sixteen enemy positions and annihilated approximately seventy-five Japanese, thereby contributing essentially to the success of his division's operations." He was presented the Medal of Honor by President Harry S. Truman on October 5, 1945.

== Early years ==
Douglas Jacobson was born in Rochester, New York, on November 25, 1925, the son of a carpenter. He attended elementary and high school in Port Washington, New York. He worked for his father as a draftsman, and was a lifeguard and swimming instructor before enlisting in the Marine Corps Reserve on January 28, 1943, at the age of 17.

== Enlisted service ==
Following recruit training at the Marine Corps Recruit Depot Parris Island, South Carolina, he was transferred to the 23rd Marine Regiment at Camp Lejeune, New River, North Carolina, and was promoted in July 1943 to private first class. As a member of the 3rd Battalion, 23rd Marines, 4th Marine Division, he was sent overseas in December 1943, and participated in the campaigns for Tinian, Marianas Islands, Marshall Islands, and Iwo Jima.

He was commended in division orders of the 4th Marine Division "…for excellent performance of duties as a Browning automatic rifleman while serving with a rifle company during action against enemy Japanese forces on Saipan, Marianas Island from June 15, to June 28, 1944…"

On February 26, 1945, during the Battle of Iwo Jima, he destroyed multiple enemy positions during fierce combat. For his actions on that day, he was awarded the Medal of Honor.

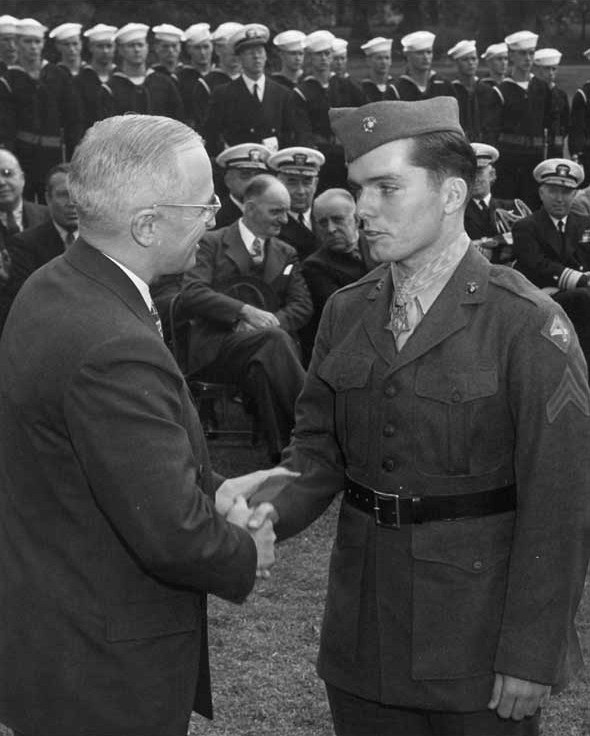
CPL Jacobson with President Harry Truman after receiving the Medal of Honor

Promoted to corporal in April 1945, he returned to the United States that September, reporting to Headquarters Battalion, Headquarters Marine Corps, Washington, D.C., and was subsequently transferred to the Naval Shipyard, New York, New York, until discharged as a corporal in December 1945. In October 1945, he received the Medal of Honor from President Harry Truman.

He then reenlisted in the United States Marine Corps on April 22, 1946, and was retained at District Headquarters Recruiting Station, Washington, D.C., as a recruiting sergeant. Reappointed a line corporal in September 1946, he was ordered to a replacement battalion at Oceanside, California, embarking in November aboard the USS General William Mitchell as a replacement for the 1st Marine Division, Fleet Marine Force. He joined the 1st Engineer Battalion in December 1946, and served with the 1st Marine Division in Peiping and Tsingtao, China. He was promoted to sergeant in May 1947.

Returning from overseas in December 1948, he reported to the Marine Air Detachment, U.S. Naval Air Station, Columbus, Ohio, and was subsequently returned to the Naval Base, New York, New York, for discharge as a sergeant on April 21, 1949.

In 1953 he worked for the VA in Miami. He served 8 months in the Florida National Guard before being discharged to reenlist in the Marine Corps Reserve as a technical sergeant in September 1953 as a member of the 2d 155 mm Gun Battalion, at Miami, Florida.

== Commissioned Service ==
He was ordered to active duty to attend the 9th Officer Candidate Course, at Quantico, Virginia. Discharged from the Reserve in December 1953, he was immediately reappointed a technical sergeant in the regular Marine Corps, and subsequently commissioned a second lieutenant in March 1954, with date of rank from June 5, 1953.

Following graduation from the 1st Basic Course at Quantico in June 1954, he served briefly as a detachment officer until transferred to the 3rd Marine Division, at Camp Pendleton. As a member of the 3d Marine Division, Lieutenant Jacobson left the United States in December 1954, arriving in Japan the next month. During this tour of duty he served as executive officer and later commanding officer of Company A, 1st Battalion, 9th Marines, 3rd Marine Division, and was promoted to first lieutenant with date of rank from December 5, 1954.

Returning from overseas in June 1955, Lieutenant Jacobson reported to the Marine Barracks, U.S. Naval Base, Brooklyn, New York, and served as a guard officer until July 1956, when he was transferred to the 2nd Battalion, 2nd Marines, 2nd Marine Division, Camp Lejeune, North Carolina. At Camp Lejeune, he served as a company officer in Company D and later as commanding officer of Headquarters & Service Company.

In August 1957, he became a range officer at the Rifle Range Battalion, Marine Corps Base, Camp Lejeune, and was promoted to captain in November.

In January 1958, he was reassigned to the General Supply Service Company, 2nd Service Regiment, 2nd Marine Division, Camp Lejeune, to attend Supply Officer Course #2-58. Upon completion of the course in April 1958, he was assigned duties as a supply officer with Sub Unit #1, Headquarters Company, Headquarters Battalion, Marine Corps Base, at Camp Lejeune.

In October 1958, he became officer in charge of Self-Service Center, Base Material Battalion, 2nd Force Service Regiment at Camp Lejeune, and then served in various other supply duty capacities with the battalion until July 1960, when he was ordered to duty with the 3rd Marine Division on Okinawa.

Captain Jacobson served as regimental supply officer of the 3rd Marine Regiment with the division until December 1960, when he returned to the Base Material Battalion, at Camp Lejeune. There, he served as assistant warehouse officer and officer in charge, Subsistence Branch and Storage Division, until April 1962, when he was assigned as commanding officer, H&S Company, 2d Pioneer Battalion, 2d Marine Division, Camp Lejeune. He was promoted to major on July 1, 1964, and retired in 1967.

== Later life ==
After his discharge, he lived in New Jersey and sold real estate. In 1987, he moved to Florida.

Major Jacobson died on August 20, 2000, in Port Charlotte, Florida, of congestive heart failure and pneumonia. He is buried in Arlington National Cemetery, Arlington, Virginia. His grave can be found in court 5, section H, stack 17, niche 3 of the columbarium.

The veterans home in Port Charlotte is named in his honor.

== Medal of Honor citation ==
The President of the United States takes pleasure in presenting the MEDAL OF HONOR to

PRIVATE FIRST CLASS DOUGLAS T. JACOBSON
UNITED STATES MARINE CORPS RESERVE

for service as set forth in the following CITATION:

For conspicuous gallantry and intrepidity at the risk of his life above and beyond the call of duty while serving with the Third Battalion, Twenty-Third Marines, Fourth Marine Division, in combat against enemy Japanese forces during the seizure of Iwo Jima in the Volcano Islands, February 26, 1945. Promptly destroying a stubborn 20-mm. antiaircraft gun and its crew after assuming the duties of a bazooka man who had been killed, Private First Class Jacobson waged a relentless battle as his unit fought desperately toward the summit of Hill 382 in an effort to penetrate the heart of Japanese cross-island defenses. Employing his weapon with ready accuracy when his platoon was halted by overwhelming enemy fire on February 26, he first destroyed two hostile machine-gun positions, then attacked a large blockhouse, completely neutralizing the fortification before dispatching the five-man crew of a pillbox and exploding the installation with a terrific demolitions blast. Moving steadily forward, he wiped out an earth-covered rifle emplacement and, confronted by a cluster of similar emplacements which constituted the perimeter of enemy defenses in his assigned sector, fearlessly advanced, quickly reduced all six positions to a shambles, killed ten of the enemy and enabled our forces to occupy the strong point. Determined to widen the breach thus forced, he volunteered his services to an adjacent assault company, neutralized a pillbox holding up its advance, opened fire on a Japanese tank pouring a steady stream of bullets on one of our supporting tanks and smashed the enemy tank's gun turret in a brief but furious action culminating in a single-handed assault against still another blockhouse and the subsequent neutralization of its firepower. By his dauntless skill and valor, Private First Class Jacobson destroyed a total of sixteen enemy positions and annihilated approximately seventy-five Japanese, thereby contributing essentially to the success of his division's operations against the fanatically defended outpost of the Japanese Empire. His gallant conduct in the face of tremendous odds enhanced and sustained the highest traditions of the United States Naval Service.

/S/ HARRY S. TRUMAN

== Awards and decorations ==

1st row	Medal of Honor		
2nd row	Purple Heart with gold star	Air Medal	Navy and Marine Corps Commendation Medal
3rd row	Combat Action Ribbon	Navy Presidential Unit Citation with two service stars	Marine Corps Good Conduct Medal
4th row	China Service Medal	American Campaign Medal	Asiatic-Pacific Campaign Medal with four campaign stars
5th row	World War Two Victory Medal	Navy Occupation Service Medal with 'ASIA' Clasp	National Defense Service Medal with service star

== See also ==
- List of Medal of Honor recipients
- List of Medal of Honor recipients for World War II
- List of Medal of Honor recipients for the Battle of Iwo Jima
