= USS Lowndes =

1944 Haskell-class attack transport

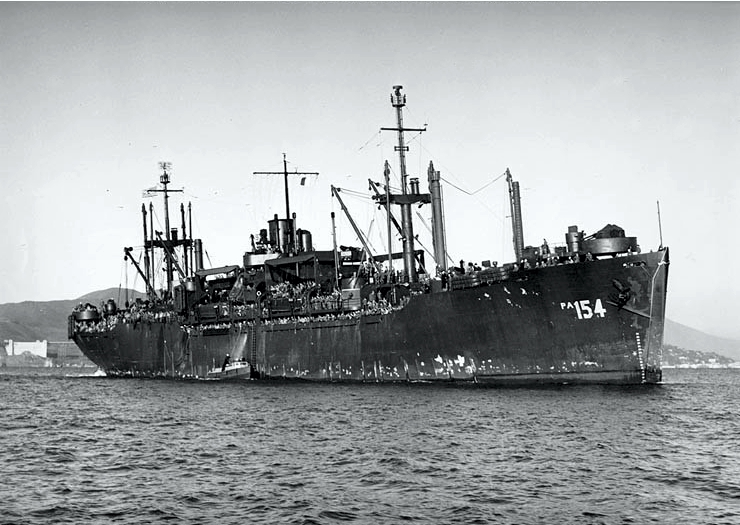

History

United States
- Name: USS Lowndes
- Namesake: Lowndes County, Alabama; Lowndes County, Georgia; Lowndes County, Mississippi
- Ordered: as type VC2-S-AP5
- Laid down: date unknown
- Launched: 18 July 1944
- Acquired: 14 September 1944
- Commissioned: 14 September 1944
- Decommissioned: 17 April 1946
- Stricken: 1 May 1946
- Fate: Scrapped, 1983

General characteristics
- Displacement: 12,450 tons (full load)
- Length: 455 ft 0 in (138.68 m)
- Beam: 62 ft 0 in (18.90 m)
- Draught: 24 ft 0 in (7.32 m)
- Speed: 19 knots
- Complement: 536
- Armament: one 5 in (130 mm) gun mount, twelve 40 mm gun mounts, ten 20 mm gun mounts

USS Lowndes (APA/LPA-154) was a Haskell-class attack transport in service with the United States Navy from 1944 to 1946. She was scrapped in 1983.

== History ==
Lowndes was launched under a Maritime Commission contract by Oregon Shipbuilding Co., Portland, Oregon, 18 July 1944; sponsored by Mrs. Fred J. Lundberg; acquired by the Navy 14 September 1944; and commissioned the same day.

=== World War II ===
After shakedown, Lowndes departed San Pedro, California, 23 October for amphibious training in the Hawaiian Islands. She continued landing rehearsals for the rest of the year in preparation for the Iwo Jima and Okinawa operations.

Departing Pearl Harbor 27 January 1945, Lowndes carried troops and equipment to staging areas in Saipan before continuing toward Iwo Jima. She arrived off the southeast coast of the volcanic island 19 February and lowered her boats for the massive amphibious assault. She carried the 3rd Battalion 23rd Marines and C Co 133 NCB (their assigned Shore Party). For the next eight days Lowndes stood by as her beach party went ashore to attend and evacuate casualties to salvage boats, and to clear the beaches for landing craft. The transport returned to Saipan 3 March to prepare for the final leg on the island hopping campaign which was pushing Japan back to her home islands.

Lowndes sailed 27 March for the 1 April invasion of Okinawa arriving there in the morning hours of D Day. The transport waited in the retirement area until 12 April when under constant enemy air raids she debarked troops and unloaded cargo for the vigorous campaign ashore. Returning Saipan 18 April Lowndes performed training exercises there and in the Southwest Pacific Ocean until she departed Guam 11 July for San Francisco, California.

=== Decommissioning and fate ===
The transport made another cruise to the western Pacific (August October) carrying troops and cargo to the Philippines and Japan for occupation duty. Loaded with homeward bound veterans Lowndes departed Saipan 6 October for the United States. Sailing to the U.S. East Coast in February 1946, she decommissioned at Norfolk, Virginia, 17 April 1946, and returned to War Shipping Administration (WSA) for disposal.

== Awards ==
Lowndes received two battle stars for World War II service.
