= USS Newberry =

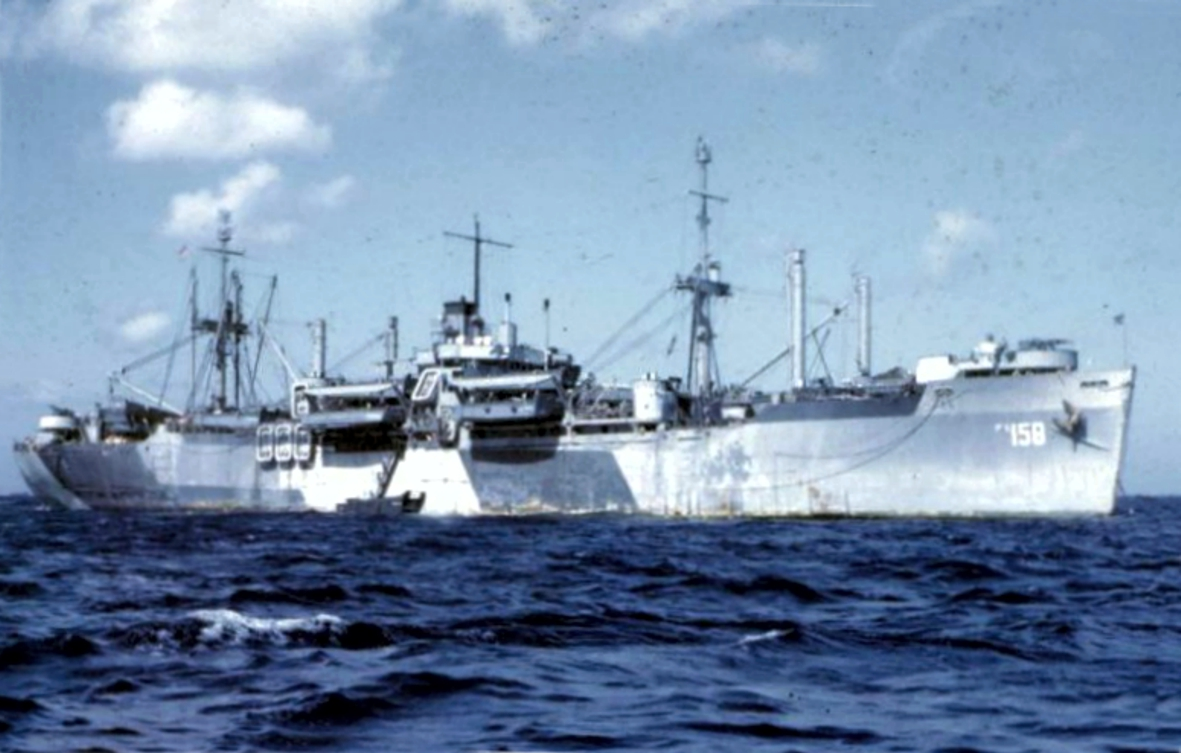

History

United States
- Name: USS Newberry
- Namesake: Newberry County, South Carolina
- Ordered: as type VC2-S-AP5
- Laid down: 10 June 1944
- Launched: 24 August 1944
- Acquired: 6 October 1944
- Commissioned: 7 October 1944
- Decommissioned: 21 February 1946
- Stricken: 12 March 1946
- Fate: Scrapped 1984

General characteristics
- Displacement: 12,450 tons (full load)
- Length: 455 ft 0 in (138.68 m)
- Beam: 62 ft 0 in (18.90 m)
- Draft: 24 ft 0 in (7.32 m)
- Speed: 19 knots
- Complement: 536
- Armament: one 5 in (130 mm) gun mount, twelve 40 mm gun mounts, ten 20 mm gun mounts

USS Newberry (APA-158) was a Haskell-class attack transport in service with the United States Navy from 1944 to 1946. She was scrapped in 1984.

== History ==
Newberry was laid down under United States Maritime Commission contract 10 June 1944 by Oregon Shipbuilding Corp., Portland, Oregon; launched 24 August 1944; sponsored by Mrs. Joseph M. McDonald; acquired by the Navy on a loan-charter basis 6 October 1944; and commissioned the next day.

=== World War II ===
Newberry conducted shakedown off the U.S. West Coast, then departed San Francisco, California, for Hawaii, where she conducted final training in amphibious operations. On 31 December 1944 she embarked the 1st Battalion 23rd Marines and their Shore Party A Co 133 NCB plus half of A Co 4th Pioneers--- U.S. 4th Marine Division, and left Pearl Harbor for the invasion of Iwo Jima. After landing her Marines, for 10 days following D-day, she took on a total of 439 wounded. Speedy medical attention doubtless saved many from certain death. Newberry departed Iwo for Guam on the 27th.

Sailing via Saipan, she embarked part of the U.S. 2d Marine Division at Guam on 8 March 1945, and on the 27th, got underway for the Okinawa operation. Standing in reserve, her troops were not needed; and she returned them to Saipan in April. Newberry remained there until early in June, then sailed to Espiritu Santo for supplies. She returned to Guam 2 July and sailed for San Francisco less than two weeks later, arriving on the 27th.

The attack transport departed the U.S. West Coast 12 August, carrying replacement troops to the Philippines. At Leyte she took on Army units destined for occupation duty in the Japanese home islands, debarked them at Aomori, Honshū, and began "Operation Magic Carpet" duty. She sailed 29 September for Iwo Jima, where she took on 2,500 passengers for Saipan. Exchanging these for another 2,300 veterans, she stood out from Saipan for San Francisco, arriving 24 October. Two weeks later she headed for Okinawa with replacements, and returned to California with still another full load of veterans.

=== Decommissioning and fate ===
Newberry was decommissioned on 21 February 1946 and returned to the War Shipping Administration (WSA) 3 March at Lee Hall, Virginia, and struck from the Navy List 12 March. She was berthed at James River, Virginia, as part of the National Defense Reserve Fleet. She was sold for scrapping on 17 September 1983 to Desguaces Aviles S.A., Spain, and completely scrapped as of 8 June 1984.
