= Combat Logistics Battalion 23 =

- Active: 7 September 2013 – Present
- Country: United States
- Branch: USMC
- Part of: 4th Marine Logistics Group
- Garrison/HQ: Joint Base Lewis McCord, WA
- Nickname: "Trucking Reservists"
- Motto: "Ego postulo ut."
- Mascot: "Karl"
- Engagements: Global war on terrorism

Commanders
- Commanding Officer: Lieutenant Colonel David L. Wood, USMCR
- Inspector-Instructor: Lieutenant Colonel James C. Workman Jr.

Combat Logistics Battalion 23 (CLB-23) is a Military Logistics Battalion of the United States Marine Corps Reserve. The unit is based out of the New Orleans, Louisiana with Marine Forces Reserve and headquartered in Fort Lewis, WA under the command of the 4th Marine Logistics Group (4th MLG).

== Mission ==
The Combat Logistics Battalions of the USMC rapidly task organize, deploy, employ, fight and redeploy in order to provide logistics combat support to a Regimental Combat Team (RCT) and additional Marine Air-Ground Task Force (MAGTF) maneuver elements in the RCT's battlespace, beyond their organic capabilities, in order to enable continuity of operations. Be prepared to (BPT) assume the duties of the Logistics Combat Element (LCE) for the ACM

== Table of organization – Combat Logistics Battalion 23 ==
- Headquarters and Service Company, in Joint Base Lewis–McChord, (WA)
- Combat Logistics Company Alpha, in Joint Base Lewis–McChord, (WA)
- Combat Logistics Company Bravo, in Joint Base Lewis–McChord, (WA)
- General Support Company, in Joint Base Lewis–McChord, (WA)

== History ==
Combat Logistics Battalion 23 was first formed in Fort Lewis, Washington, Washington in 2013 with the re-designation of 4th Landing Support Battalion as a Combat Logistics Battalion. The unit's first commanding officer was Lieutenant Colonel David L. Brooks, USMCR.

On 7 September 2013, 4th Landing Support Battalion conducted its official de-activation ceremony at the Battalion headquarters on Joint Base Lewis McChord WA. That same day, Combat Logistics Battalion 23 officially uncased its colors for the first time. The newest CLB in the Marine Corps, CLB-23 is organized to echo its active duty counterparts within the USMC. Combat Logistics Battalion 23 (CLB-23) is headquartered at Fort Lewis, Washington

In June 2015, CLB-23 was designated fully operational and ready for any combat operations after the successful completion of a battalion wide Integrated Training Exercise at Marine Corps Air Ground Combat Center 29 Palms, CA. The Infantry Training Exercise cumulated with 3'rd Platoon TS Co of Ft. Lewis, WA completing the Enhanced Motor Operations Course with the strongest overall combat readiness grade, and directly resulting a high battalion wide combat operational readiness rating.

In June 2018, CLB-23 assisted NATO forces in the Baltic region of Latvia and Lithuania in support of Saber Strike to build readiness and response. CLB-23 successfully delivered logistical support to adjoining United States Army units and other European partner nations. H&S personnel maintained FOB operations while Third Platoon with Transportation Services Company provided support to Norwegian infantry units and Marine infantrymen of 1st Battalion, 6th Marines.

== Unit awards ==
A unit citation or commendation is an award bestowed upon an organization for the action cited. Members of the unit who participated in said actions are allowed to wear on their uniforms the awarded unit citation. Awards and decorations of the United States Armed Forces have different categories: i.e. Service, Campaign, Unit, and Valor. Unit awards are distinct from personal decorations. The 4th Landing Support Battalion (Now Combat Logistics Battalion 23) has been presented with the following awards:

Ribbon	Battalion Unit Award	A Company Unit Award (inactive)	B Co Unit Award (inactive)	C Company Unit Award (inactive)
	Presidential Unit Citation with one Bronze Star	Presidential Unit Citation	Presidential Unit Citation	Presidential Unit Citation
	Navy Unit Commendation			
	Meritorious Unit Commendation			
	Asiatic-Pacific Campaign Streamer with four Bronze Stars			
	World War II Victory Streamer			
	National Defense Service Medal with three Bronze Stars			
	Southwest Asia Service Medal			
	Iraq Campaign Medal			
	Global War on Terrorism Expeditionary Medal			
	Global War on Terrorism Service Medal			

== See also ==
- List of United States Marine Corps battalions
- Organization of the United States Marine Corps
- 4th Landing Support Battalion
- Naval Mobile Construction Battalion 133
