= Austin R. Brunelli =

U.S. Marine Corps Brigadier General

Austin Roger Brunelli
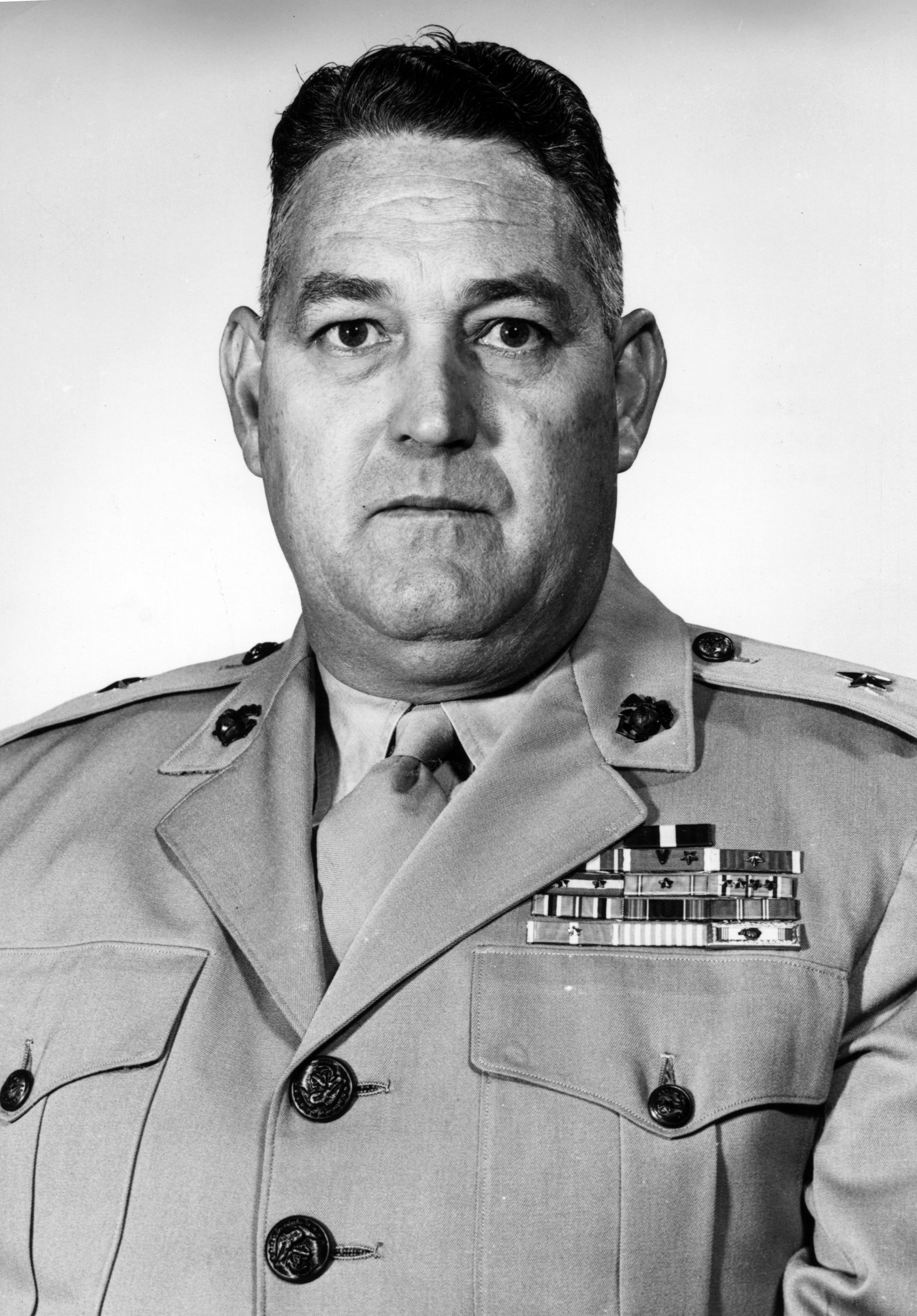
- Brigadier general Brunelli, USMC
- Born: August 20, 1907; Blossburg, New Mexico, U.S.
- Died: September 23, 1989 (aged 82); Virginia Beach, Virginia, U.S.
- Military career
- Allegiance: United States of America
- Branch: United States Marine Corps
- Service years: 1931–1962
- Rank: Brigadier general
- Nickname: "Bunny"
- Service number: 0-4640
- Commands: Camp Lejeune; ADC of 2nd Marine Division; 24th Marine Regiment; CoS of 1st Marine Division; 1st Battalion, 24th Marines; 3rd Battalion, 24th Marines
- Conflicts: World War II; Battle of Kwajalein; Battle of Saipan; Battle of Tinian; Battle of Iwo Jima; Korean War
- Awards: Navy Cross; Silver Star; Legion of Merit (2); Purple Heart (2)

Austin Roger Brunelli (August 20, 1907 – September 23, 1989) was a highly decorated American combat veteran of World War II and the Korean War. As the commanding officer of the 1st Battalion, 24th Marines during the Battle of Iwo Jima, he was awarded the Navy Cross, the United States military's second-highest decoration awarded for valor in combat. He later served as chief of staff of the 1st Marine Division in Korea and commanding general of Camp Lejeune.

== Early career ==
Austin R. Brunelli was born on August 20, 1907, in a small mining town, Blossburg, New Mexico, as the oldest child of Ernest and Minnie Brunelli. His family later moved to Raton, New Mexico, where he attended a local high school, graduating in 1924. Brunelli subsequently attended Colorado College for two years, before he received an appointment to the United States Naval Academy at Annapolis, Maryland. After four years of studies, during which he was active in football, baseball and boxing, he graduated with the rank of second lieutenant in the Marine Corps on June 4, 1931.

Like any other new Marine officer, Brunelli was sent for further officer training at the Basic School at Philadelphia Navy Yard. He spent one year there, before he was attached to the Naval Prison Detachment at Marine Barracks Parris Island, South Carolina in July 1932. Brunelli was transferred to the Marine detachment aboard the aircraft carrier USS Lexington in March 1934 and spent the next sixteen months on patrol duties along the West Coast.

In June 1934, Brunelli was promoted to the rank of first lieutenant, and one year later w

was transferred to San Diego, California, where he was attached to the 2nd Battalion, 6th Marine Regiment stationed there. Apparently influenced by his service on the aircraft carrier USS Lexington, Brunelli asked for naval aviator training and was transferred to Naval Air Station Pensacola, Florida in January 1936.

However, he dropped out of training in December 1936 and was transferred back to the infantry and appointed adjutant and assistant operations officer on the staff of the 1st Marine Brigade under Brigadier General James J. Meade. He served in this capacity until May 1937, when he was ordered to the Marine Corps Base Quantico, where he was appointed aide-de-camp to Commanding General James C. Breckinridge. Brunelli exchanged this administrative assignment with sea duties aboard the heavy cruiser USS New Orleans, where he served with the rank of captain as commanding officer of the Marine detachment from June 1938.

== World War II ==
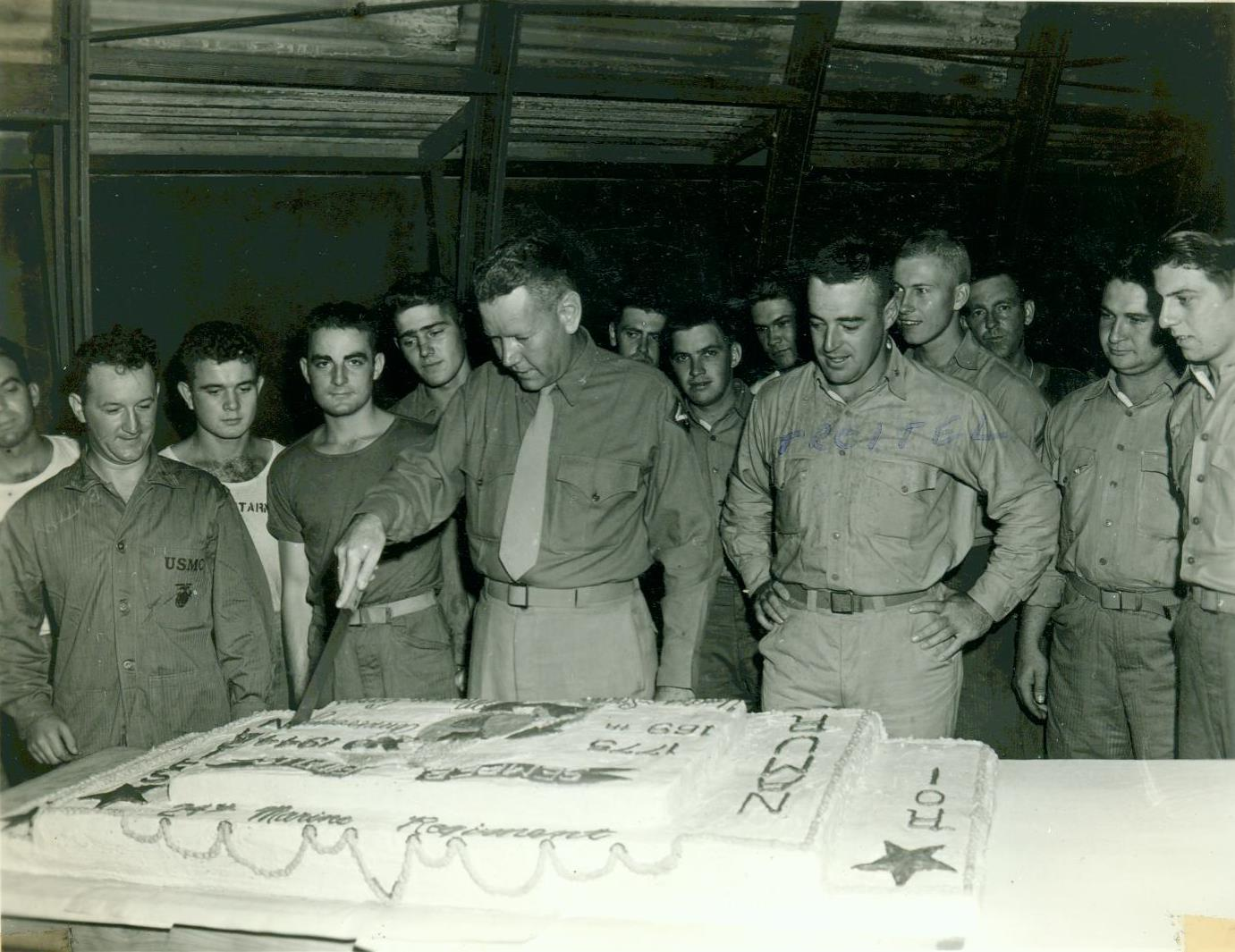
Brunelli cutting the cake with the members of the 24th Marine Regiment during the celebration of the Marine Corps Birthday in Maui, 1944

Brunelli returned to the United States at the end of May 1940 and following the one-month leave, he was transferred for a new assignment at Headquarters Marine Corps in Washington, D.C. He was subsequently appointed to the prestigious capacity of aide to the Commandant of the Marine Corps, Thomas Holcomb in July 1940. Brunelli remained at Headquarters Marine Corps until June 1943, when he was sent for instruction to the Marine Corps Command and Staff College at Quantico. He graduated from the course in September 1943 and was promoted to major.

He was subsequently transferred to Camp Pendleton, California, where he succeeded Lieutenant Colonel Homer Litzenberg as commanding officer of 3rd Battalion, 24th Marines. His unit was later attached to the 4th Marine Division under Major General Harry Schmidt and finally sailed to the Pacific theater in January 1944. Brunelli was meantime promoted to lieutenant colonel.

During the upcoming Battle of Kwajalein at the beginning of February 1944, Brunelli was appointed commander of an Assault Landing Team (consisting of his battalion) in the capture of Namur Island. He landed on the beach on the morning of February 1, and after he found out, that only about sixty percent of his men had landed because of missing LVTs, Brunelli reorganized the available units and attacked the enemy's positions. He then led another attack, overrunning fortified and entrenched positions and subsequently repulsed a fanatical Japanese counterattack. Even though he was slightly wounded, Brunelli remained in command of the battalion and took part in the final assault to wipe out the last enemy resistance.

For his inspiring leadership and gallantry in action, Brunelli was decorated with the Legion of Merit with Combat "V". He also received the Purple Heart for his wounds.

Brunelli was transferred to the staff of the 24th Marine Regiment, when he was appointed the regiment's executive officer in March 1944. He served in that capacity during the crucial Battle of Saipan during June and July 1944. When the commanding officer of 1st Battalion, Lieutenant Colonel Maynard C. Schultz, was killed in action on June 16, Brunelli temporarily assumed his command. After he found out that two companies of his battalion had suffered heavy casualties and were forced to withdraw, Brunelli did not hesitate to undertake a personal reconnaissance under heavy enemy fire. He reestablished his lines, resumed contact with the adjacent units, and launched a successful attack which eliminated Japanese positions in the area.

He remained in command of the 1st Battalion until July 4, when he was relieved by Lieutenant Colonel Otto Lessing. Brunelli subsequently returned to the staff of the 24th Marine Regiment as executive officer. Following the battle, he was decorated with the Silver Star for his repeated heroism in combat.

Lieutenant Colonel Brunelli took part in the Battle of Tinian one month later, and following the promotion of regiment's commanding officer, Franklin A. Hart at the end of August 1944, Brunelli assumed temporary command of the 24th Marine Regiment. All of the 4th Marine Division's units had been weakened by combat and were ordered back to Hawaii for rest and refit. He led the 24th Marines to Maui and subsequently passed command to the regiment's new commanding officer, Colonel Walter I. Jordan, on September 7, 1944.

He spent the following four months in intensive training and preparation for the upcoming Battle of Iwo Jima, before he left Hawaii at the beginning of January 1945. The 24th Marines landed on Iwo Jima on February 19, 1945, and after two weeks of fighting, fierce enemy resistance had significantly reduced the 1st Battalion. Brunelli was wounded for the second time during the battle, but returned to the front lines and assumed command of the 1st Battalion. He personally made a reconnaissance of his entire front line and then reorganized his badly depleted units into two rifle companies and resumed the attack until all enemy resistance was defeated.

Brunelli was originally decorated with another Silver Star medal, but this decoration was later upgraded to Navy Cross, the United States military's second-highest decoration awarded for valor in combat.

== Korea and later career ==
Hardly depleted, the 4th Marine Division was subsequently ordered again back to Hawaii in April 1945, where it remained until the end of the war. During August 1945, Brunelli was appointed commanding general of the 4th Division Service Troops, assuming responsibility for the supply, salvage, evacuation, construction, personnel management, quartering and sanitation needs of all 4th Marine Division units. Brunelli sailed with the 4th Marine Division to the United States in November 1945 and subsequently supervised its deactivation at Camp Pendleton, California on November 28, 1945.

His next assignment was with Marine Barracks at Camp Lejeune, North Carolina from January 1946. In August of the same year, Brunelli was assigned to the Senior Course at the Amphibious Warfare School at Marine Corps Base Quantico. He completed the course in May 1947 and subsequently was appointed assistant director of the Basic School there. Brunelli remained in Quantico until June 1950, when he was promoted to the rank of colonel and transferred to the staff of Commander, Amphibious Force, Pacific Fleet at Coronado, California.

Within this command, he served in Japan and Korea from March 1952. While in Korea, Brunelli was transferred to the 1st Marine Division under the command of Major General John T. Selden and succeeded Colonel Custin Burton Jr. as Division Chief of Staff. He took part in the actions on the western front and participated in the defense of Outpost Bunker Hill. Brunelli served with the 1st Marine Division until October 1952, when he was succeeded by Colonel Henry W. Buse Jr. and ordered back to the United States.

For his service in Korea, Colonel Brunelli received his second Legion of Merit with Combat "V".

He returned to the United States at the beginning of November 1952 and was assigned back to the staff of Commander, Amphibious Force, Pacific Fleet. Brunelli remained in this post until the end of July 1955, when he was transferred to Washington, D.C., and appointed to the office of Joint Chiefs of Staff under General Omar Bradley. While in this capacity, Brunelli was promoted to the rank of brigadier general in August 1956.

General Brunelli was subsequently transferred to Camp Lejeune, North Carolina in November 1956 and appointed Assistant Division Commander of 2nd Marine Division under Major General Reginald H. Ridgely. Brunelli received new orders in April 1958, but stayed at Camp Lejeune as the new base commander.

He was transferred to Naval Station Norfolk, Virginia, and assumed command of the Landing Force Training Unit, Amphibious Training Command, Atlantic Fleet. In this capacity, he was responsible for the amphibious training of all forces assigned to joint amphibious operations in accordance with doctrines established by the Joint Chiefs of Staff.

Brigadier General Brunelli retired from the Marine Corps on July 1, 1962, after 31 years of active service. He settled in Virginia Beach, Virginia, and died there on September 23, 1989.

== Decorations ==
Here is the ribbon bar of Brigadier General Austin R. Brunelli:

1st Row	Navy Cross		Silver Star	
2nd Row	Legion of Merit with one 5/16" gold star and Combat "V"	Purple Heart with one 5/16" gold star	Navy Presidential Unit Citation with two stars	Navy Unit Commendation
3rd Row	American Defense Service Medal with Fleet Clasp	Asiatic-Pacific Campaign Medal with four 3/16 inch service stars	American Campaign Medal	World War II Victory Medal
4th Row	National Defense Service Medal with one star	Korean Service Medal with one 3/16 inch silver service star	United Nations Korea Medal	Republic of Korea Presidential Unit Citation with Oak Leaf Cluster

== See also ==
- Battle of Iwo Jima

Military offices
Preceded by Lewis C. Hudson	Commanding general, Landing Force Training Command, Atlantic; August 1, 1958 - July 1, 1962	Succeeded by John C. Miller Jr.
Preceded by Franklin A. Hart	Commanding Officer, 24th Marine Regiment; August 31, 1944 - September 6, 1944	Succeeded by Walter I. Jordan
