= George D. Webster (USMC) =

United States Marine Corps general (1919–1992)

George Davis Webster
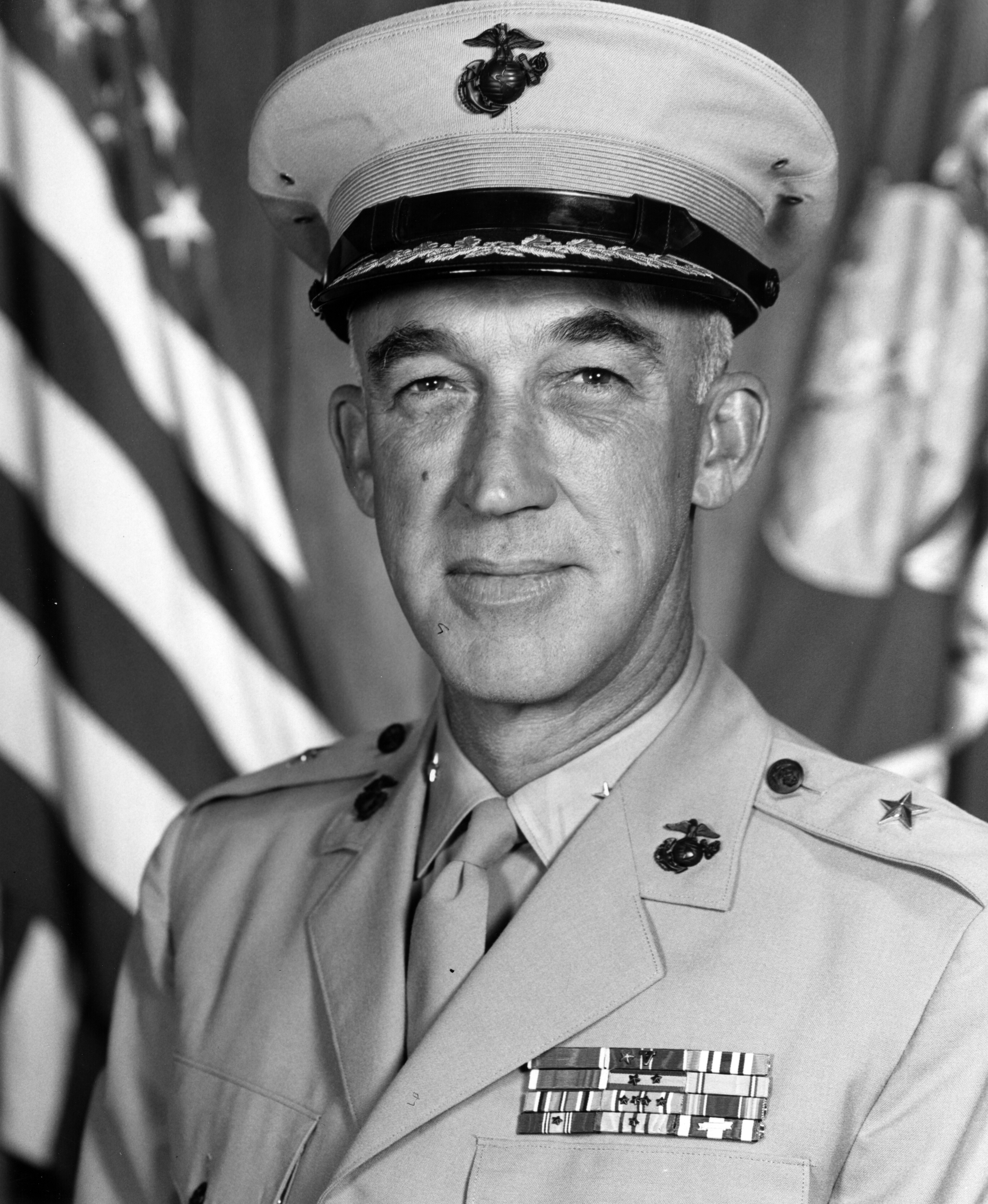
- BGen George D. Webster, USMC
- Born: November 27, 1919; Macon, Georgia, U.S.
- Died: December 16, 1992 (aged 73); Bethesda, Maryland, U.S.
- Burial place: Arlington National Cemetery
- Military career
- Allegiance: United States of America
- Branch: United States Marine Corps
- Service years: 1941–1971
- Rank: Brigadier general
- Service number: 0-7940
- Commands: Troop Training Unit, Pacific; 8th Marine Regiment; 2nd Battalion, 6th Marines
- Conflicts: World War II: Battle of Kwajalein; Battle of Saipan; Battle of Tinian; Battle of Iwo Jima; Vietnam War: Tet Offensive
- Awards: Legion of Merit (3); Bronze Star Medal (2); Purple Heart; Commendation Medal

George Davis Webster (November 27, 1919 – December 16, 1992) was a decorated officer of the United States Marine Corps with the rank of brigadier general who is most noted as commanding general, Marine Corps Development and Education Command at Quantico, Virginia.

== Early years ==
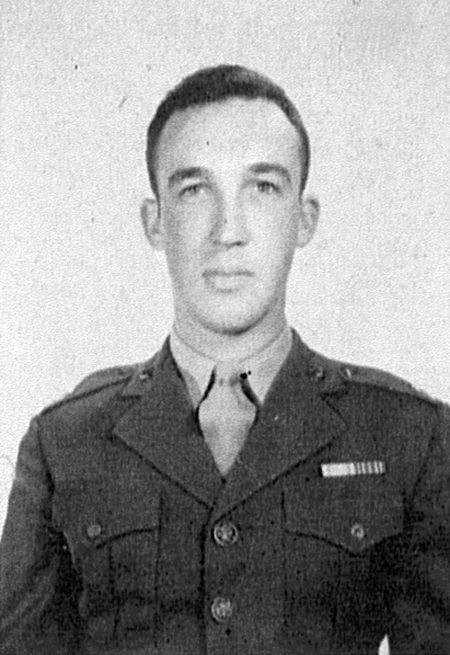
Webster shown here as captain in 1943

George D. Webster was born on November 27, 1919, in Macon, Georgia, but his family moved to High Point, North Carolina, and young George attended high school there. He was then accepted to the University of North Carolina and graduated in summer 1940 with Bachelor of Science. He entered the Marine Corps service in February 1941 and because of his university education, he was sent to the Officer Candidate School at Quantico Base, Virginia. Following the four-month Reserve officers course, he was commissioned second lieutenant on May 29, 1941.

Webster was then attached to the 2nd Battalion, 5th Marines under the command of lieutenant colonel William J. Whaling and served as Assistant Mortar Platoon Leader at Camp Lejeune, New River, North Carolina until January 1942. Following the declaration of War on Japan, he was ordered to Panama Canal Zone and served with the Marine Barracks there under Colonel James F. Moriarty until January 1943. While in the Caribbean, he was promoted to the rank of first lieutenant.

He then returned to Camp Lejeune, North Carolina and following the promotion to the rank of captain, Webster assumed duty as commander of Weapons Company, 1st Separate Battalion. Webster's unit was ordered to Camp Pendleton, California and redesignated 1st Battalion, 24th Marines in March 1943 and attached to the 4th Marine Division under Major General Harry Schmidt following its activation in August of that year.

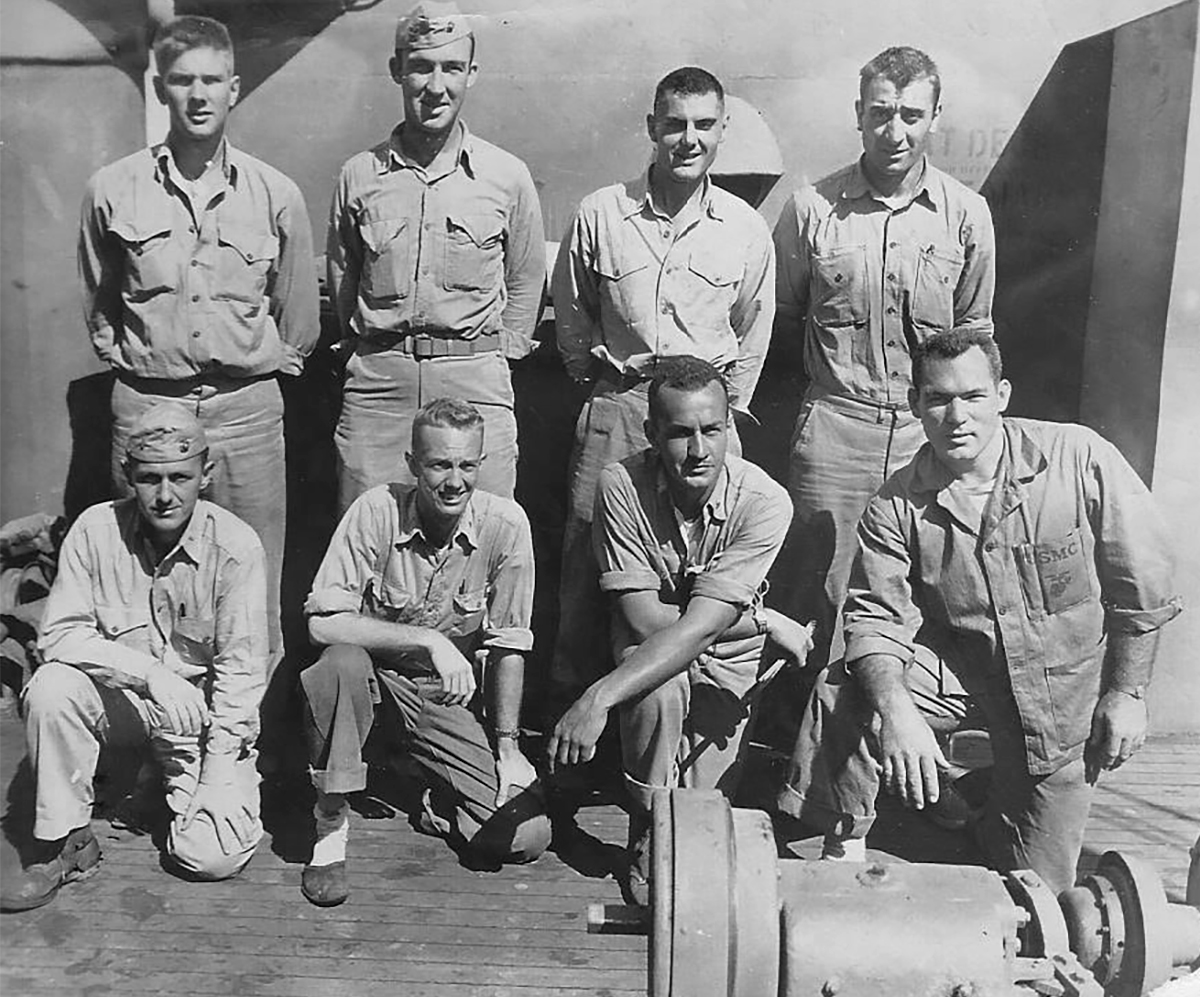
Then-Captain George D. Webster (standing second from left) and officers of D Company, 1st Battalion, 24th Marines, February 1944

Webster was appointed commanding officer of Company D in October 1943 and participated in the amphibious exercises along the Santa Margarita River, where regiment practiced night attacks and pillbox assaults. Webster sailed with his battalion for Pacific area at the beginning of January 1944 and after brief stay at Maui, Hawaii, the 24th Marines under the command of Colonel Franklin A. Hart were ordered to the Marshall Islands in order to participate in Roi Namur operation.

Following Roi Namur, Webster was appointed Intelligence officer of 1st Battalion and took part in the Battle of Saipan in June 1944. He was wounded by enemy fire on June 15 and evacuated to the rear for treatment. Webster was declared fit for duty soon afterwards and joined 2nd Battalion, 24th Marines as major and executive officer under the command of Major Frank E. Garretson. He took part with that unit in the capture of Tinian in August of that year and was awarded the Bronze Star Medal with Combat "V" for his service at Saipan and Tinian and Purple Heart for wounds sustained at Saipan.

Webster then relieved Major Robert N. Fricke as executive officer of 1st Battalion, 24th Marines and remained in that capacity during the period of training and reequipment at Maui, Hawaii. During the Battle of Iwo Jima in February 1945, he was appointed battalion operations officer under Lieutenant Colonel Austin R. Brunelli and served in that capacity until the end of hostilities on Iwo Jima. He also received his second Bronze Star for his work during the battle.

== Postwar service ==
Webster served with 24th Marines at Hawaii until October 1945, when the regiment was ordered to San Diego, California for deactivation. The 24th Marines were deactivated on October 31, 1945, and Webster then assumed duty as special services officer at Camp Lejeune, North Carolina. His main responsibilities were to establish, operate, or supervise the operation of rest camps and rest areas for Camp Lejeune garrison. Webster served in this capacity for almost year until he was ordered for Junior Course at Amphibious Warfare School at Quantico Base.

Following the graduation from the course in summer 1947, Webster was ordered to Naval Air Station Quonset Point, Rhode Island, where he served as the commanding officer of the Marine Barracks until June 1950. He was then ordered to the Naval Station Anacostia, where he attended the courses in Intelligence and Italian language. While attending the language school, Webster was promoted to the rank of lieutenant colonel in January 1951.

He was then transferred to Rome, Italy for duty as assistant naval attache and remained in Europe until July 1953. Webster then attended Senior School at Quantico and assumed duty as assistant intelligence officer of 2nd Marine Division under Major General Reginald H. Ridgely. During his tour of duty with 2nd Division, Webster also served as commanding officer of 2nd Battalion, 6th Marines, before leaving the division in May 1956.

Webster then served as an instructor within Senior School, Marine Corps Schools, Quantico until July 1959, when he was promoted to the rank of colonel and ordered to Headquarters Marine Corps in Washington, D.C., for duty as assistant intelligence officer.

== Vietnam War era ==
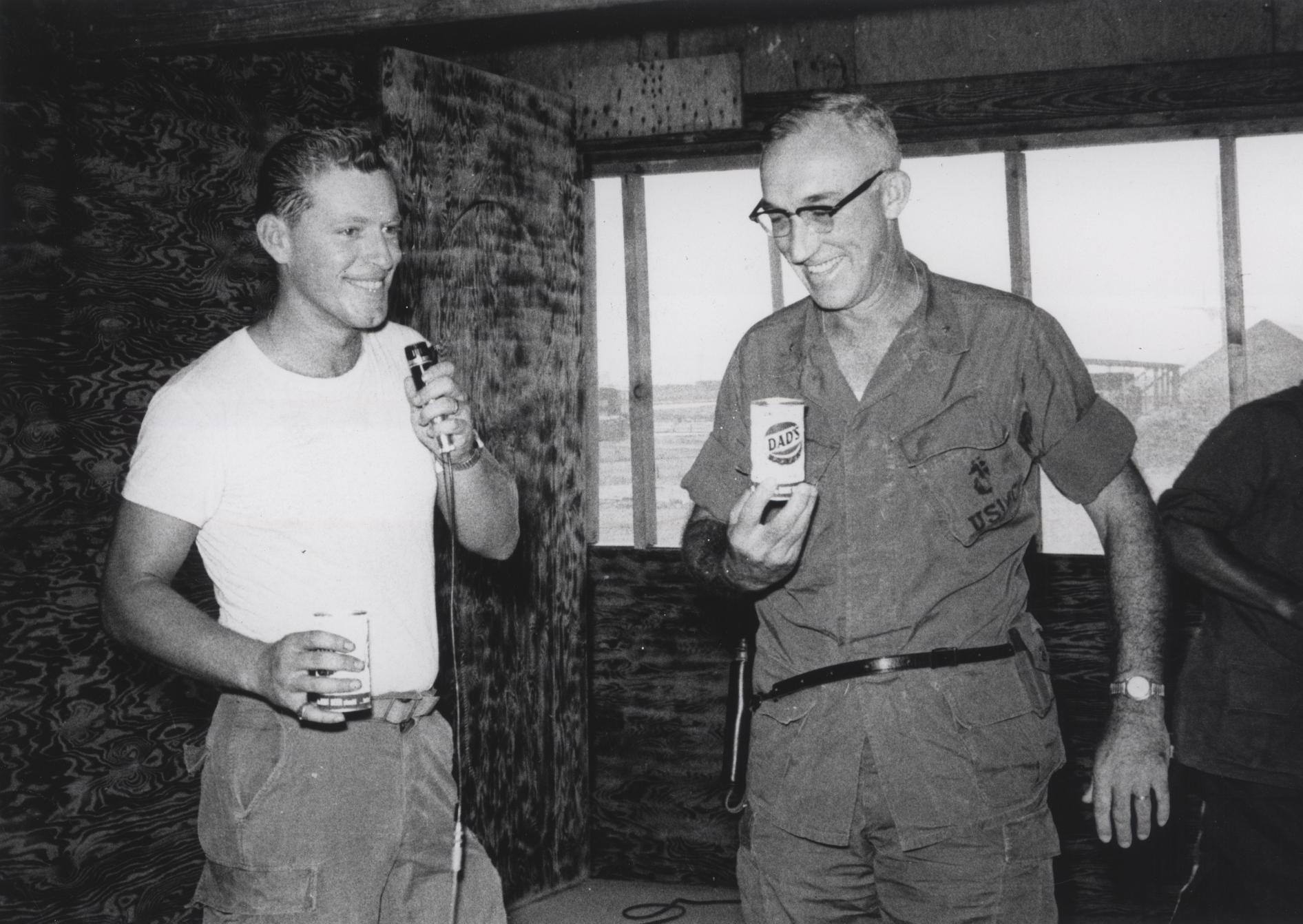
Brigadier General George D. Webster, Commanding General of Task Force X-Ray, 1st Marine Division, receives the first soda at the 1st Medical Battalion's new enlisted men's club.

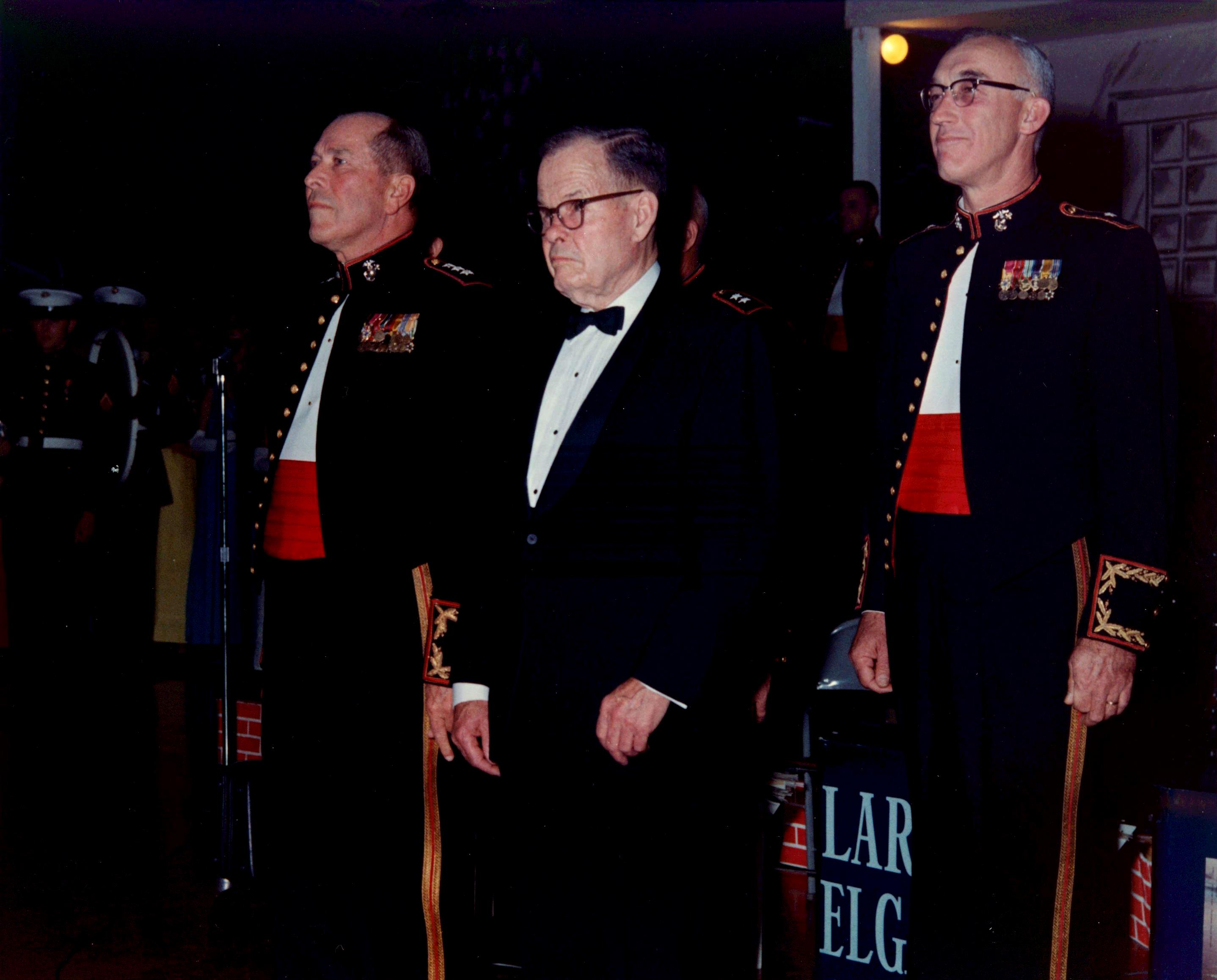
Marine Corps Birthday Celebration at Marine Corps Development and Educational Center, Quantico, Virginia, 10 November 1969. From left: LtGen Lewis J. Fields, Commanding general of the center, LtGen Lewis B. Puller (Retired), Guest of Honor and BGen Webster, Commanding General, Development and Education Command at Quantico.

In February 1962, Webster was ordered to South Vietnam and attached to Military Assistance Command, Vietnam headquarters under General Paul D. Harkins as assistant intelligence officer. He served 13 months in that country and received newly established Joint Service Commendation Medal for service in that capacity.

Upon his return to the States, Webster attended National War College in Washington, D.C., and graduated in June 1964. He then served as Secreatary of the General Staff at Headquarters Marine Corps until July 1966. He left this staff work in Washington for duty as commanding officer of 8th Marine Regiment at Camp Lejeune from 16 July 1966 to 28 December 1966.

In December 1966, when he was promoted to the rank of brigadier general and ordered to Coronado, California, as new commanding general of Landing Force Training Command, Pacific Fleet. He was responsible for the amphibious training of all units of Fleet Marine Force, Pacific including that ones going to Vietnam and received the Legion of Merit for his service in this capacity.

At the beginning of April 1968, Webster received orders for his second tour of duty in Vietnam. He joined 1st Marine Division under Major General Carl A. Youngdale as assistant division commander and also held additional duty as commanding general of Task Force X-Ray. He led his command during Operation Houston in Thừa Thiên Province against North Vietnamese and Vietcong units and later in Vĩnh Lộc District.

Task Force X-Ray was deactivated at the beginning of August 1968 and Webster was ordered to Okinawa as Deputy Commanding General, Fleet Marine Force, Pacific (Forward). He also held additional temporary duty as assistant commander, 3rd Marine Division under Major General Raymond G. Davis until November 7. His second tour in Vietnam ended in June 1969 and Webster received the Legion of Merit with Combat "V" for "exceptional initiative and ability while rendering invaluable assistant in the enormous task of directing Marine Corps support activities in the Western Pacific area".

Upon his return to the United States and brief leave, Webster began his final tour of duty as commanding general, Marine Corps Base and deputy for support to the commanding general, Marine Corps Development and Education Command at Quantico, Virginia in July 1969. He remained in that capacity until the end of June 1971, when he retired from the active service on July 1, 1971, following the 30 years of commissioned service. Webster received third Legion of Merit for his service at Quantico.

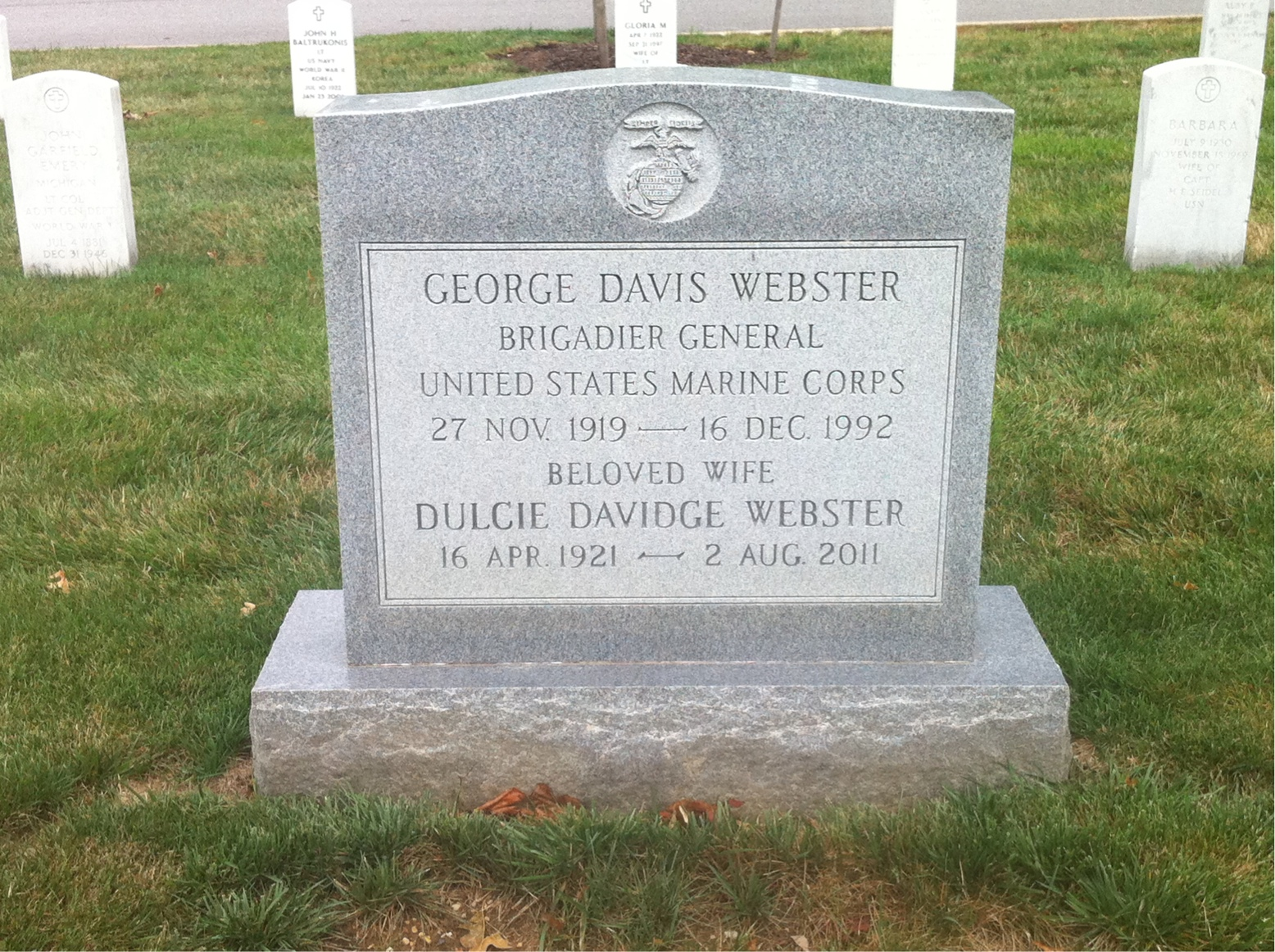
Grave at Arlington National Cemetery

He settled in Alexandria, Virginia, with his wife Dulcie Davidge Webster (1921–2011) and was a member of Army and Navy Club and the Westminster Presbyterian Church. Webster died on December 16, 1992, in Bethesda Naval Hospital following a battle with cancer. He is buried at Arlington National Cemetery, Virginia, together with his wife. They had together two children.

== Decorations ==
Webster was awarded the following decorations:

1st Row	Legion of Merit with Combat "V" and two 5/16" Gold Stars		
2nd Row	Bronze Star Medal with Combat "V" and 5/16" Gold Star	Joint Service Commendation Medal	Purple Heart
3rd Row	Navy Presidential Unit Citation with two stars	American Defense Service Medal	Asiatic-Pacific Campaign Medal with four 3/16 inch service stars
4th Row	American Campaign Medal	World War II Victory Medal	National Defense Service Medal with one star
5th Row	Vietnam Service Medal with three 3/16 inch service stars	Vietnam Gallantry Cross with Palm	Vietnam Campaign Medal

== See also ==
- Battle of Saipan
- Marine Corps Base Quantico
- Naval Amphibious Base Coronado
