= George D. Webster =

George D. Webster may refer to:

- George Webster (American football) (1945–2007), American gridiron football player
- George D. Webster (USMC) (1919–1992), United States Marine Corps general
