= 3rd Battalion, 24th Marines =

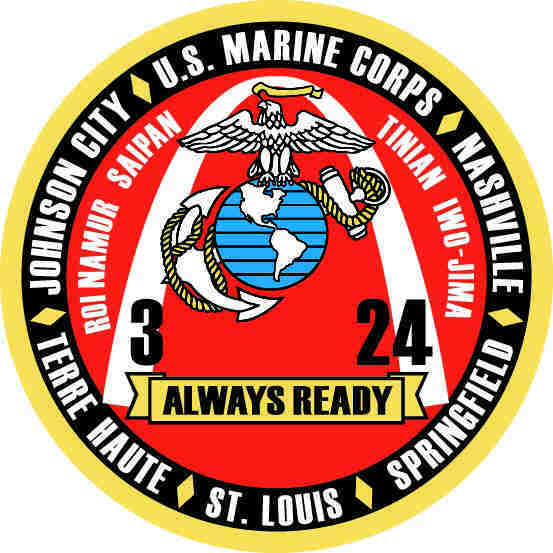
- 3/24 Insignia
- Active: February 1, 1943 – May 19, 2013
- Country: United States of America
- Branch: United States Marine Corps
- Type: Infantry battalion
- Role: Locate, close with and destroy the enemy with fire and maneuver
- Size: 800
- Part of: 24th Marine Regiment; 4th Marine Division
- Garrison/HQ: Bridgeton, Missouri
- Motto: "Always Ready"
- Engagements: World War II: Battle of Kwajalein; Battle of Saipan; Battle of Tinian; Battle of Iwo Jima; Operation Desert Storm; Operation Iraqi Freedom; Operation Enduring Freedom

Commanders
- Notable commanders: Austin R. Brunelli; Frank E. Garretson

3rd Battalion, 24th Marines (3/24) was a reserve infantry battalion in the United States Marine Corps. The battalion was first formed in 1943 for service in the Pacific Theater of Operations during World War II, taking part in a number of significant battles including those at Saipan and Iwo Jima before being deactivated at the end of the war. In the early 1960s, the unit was reactivated as a reserve battalion. It was located throughout the Midwestern United States and consisted of approximately 800 marines and sailors. The battalion was part of the 24th Marine Regiment and the 4th Marine Division. Recent operations included tours in Iraq and Afghanistan. On May 19, 2013, the battalion was deactivated (retired) as a part of 2013 Marine Corps Force Restructuring, along with the 24th Marine Regiment. 3/24 personnel were reallocated to 23rd Marine Regiment, with the majority of the companies becoming 3rd Battalion, 23rd Marines.

== Units ==
Name	Location
Headquarters and Services Company	Bridgeton, Missouri
India Company	Nashville, Tennessee
Kilo Company	Terre Haute, Indiana
Lima Company	Johnson City, Tennessee
Weapons Company	Springfield, Missouri

== Mission ==
The unit's mission is to provide a well-trained force, capable of rapidly mobilizing to augment or reinforce active duty Marine Corps forces participating in missions ranging from humanitarian/peacekeeping operations to major conflicts, in time of war, national emergency or contingency operations and during peacetime to provide operation tempo relief for active forces throughout the spectrum of operations including Joint and Combined Operations. The mission of locating, closing with, and destroying the enemy with fire and maneuver and repelling the enemy's assault with fire and close combat lies with the "grunts". Marine infantry battalions have limited organic equipment outside of small arms (maneuvering by foot as light infantry, and must be supplemented with additional trucks to become motorized infantry or Amphibious Assault Vehicles to become mechanized infantry).

== Organization ==
A Marine infantry battalion is organized into three rifle companies, a weapons company, and a headquarters company. The rifle company has three or four rifle platoons and a weapons platoon with medium machineguns and mortars. The weapons company includes a heavy machinegun platoon, a mortar platoon, and an assault platoon. Sometimes, the commander will mix these into Combined Anti-Armor Teams. The headquarters company includes all command, administration, intelligence, operations, logistics, and communication Marines and equipment, as well as the battalion's Surveillance and Target Acquisition teams (which include scout snipers).

== History ==
=== World War II ===
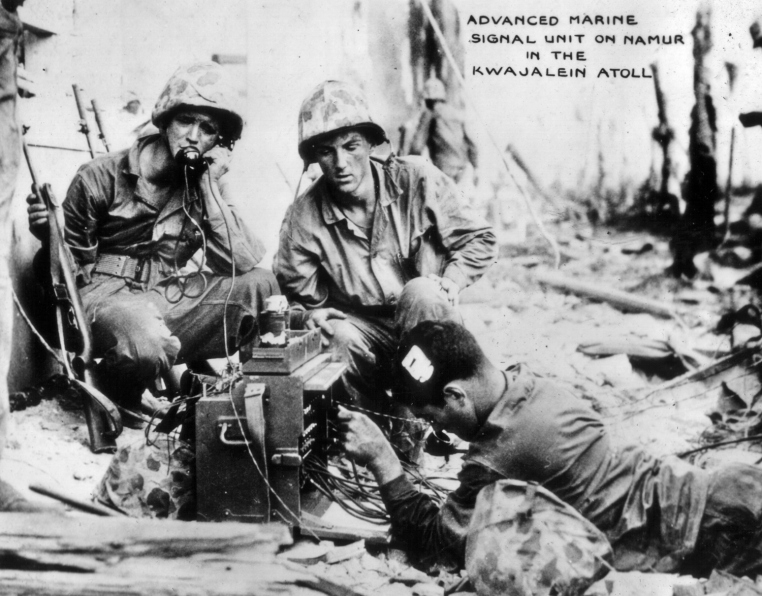
Radio Operators from Comm Platoon, 3rd Battalion, 24th Marines, under fire during the Battle of Roi-Namur

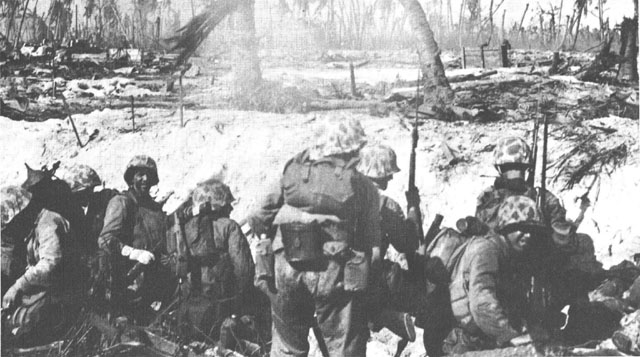
Marines from the 24th Marine Regiment during the Battle of Roi Namur

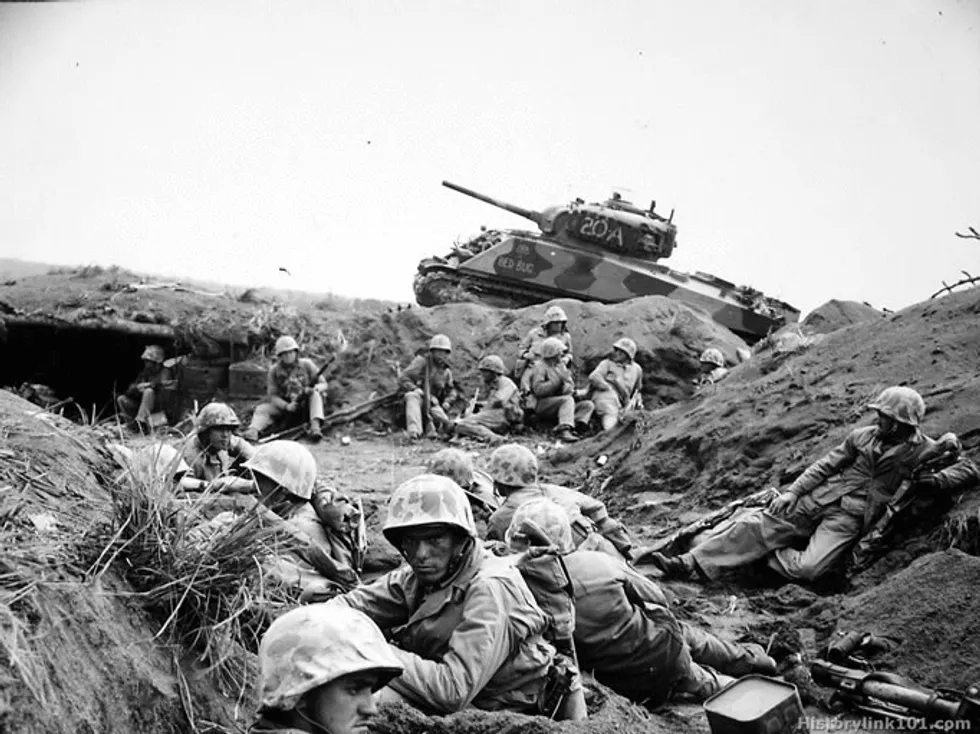
Marines from the 24th Marine Regiment during the Battle of Iwo Jima

The unit was first activated during World War II, being formed on February 1, 1943, at Marine Corps Base Camp Lejeune, North Carolina, under the designation of "Headquarters Company, 3d Separate Battalion". Later during the year, the battalion was relocated to Marine Corps Base Camp Pendleton, California, and redesignated as the "3rd Battalion 24th Marine Regiment", and assigned to the 4th Marine Division. During 1944, 3/24 was deployed to the Marshall Islands and participated in the Battles of Kwajalein, Saipan, Tinian, Roi Namur, and Iwo Jima. The battalion commanders of the unit during this period were Lieutenant Colonels Austin R. Brunelli and Alexander A. Vandegrift Jr.—son of Commandant of the Marine Corps Alexander Vandegrift—until he was severely wounded on Iwo Jima. The fighting on Iwo Jima was fierce and losses amongst the battalion were high. When the battalion reembarked after 35 days of fighting, one of its companies, Captain William T. Ketcham's Company I, which had landed on Iwo Jima the first day with 133 marines in its three rifle platoons, had only nine of these men remaining. After this, during 1945 the battalion relocated to Maui, in Hawaii, before moving to Camp Pendleton, California. Following the end of the war, the battalion was deactivated on October 31, 1945.

=== Post-World War II ===
The battalion was reactivated on July 1, 1962, at New Orleans, Louisiana, and assigned to the 4th Marine Division, USMCR. During 1967, the battalion headquarters was relocated to Missouri.

The battalion deployed to Greece and Turkey from December 1972 – January 1973 for annual training. 3/24 carries the distinction of being the first Marine reserve battalion to go overseas for annual training. 3/24 performed as the ground combat element for a multi-national force brigade named CINCSOUTH. Under the charter of the North Atlantic Treaty Organization (NATO), five countries participated: Greece, Italy, Turkey, England, and the United States. 3/24 assaulted the beaches of Greece in the Marine Corps' brand new LVTP-7, commonly known as an "AAV" or "Amtrac."

The battalion deployed to Panama from September to October, 1976, for annual training. 3/24 trained at the Jungle Operations Training Center based in Fort Sherman, near the Panama Canal. Courses included riverine boat operations, jungle living, mines and booby traps, expedient antennas, navigation, helo extract, rappelling, night jungle patrolling, POW rescue, reconnaissance, and rope bridges.

=== Desert Storm/Desert Shield/Gulf War ===
3/24 was activated with the entire 24th Marine Regiment on November 13, 1990, for Operation Desert Shield/Desert Storm. During the first week of December 1990, the command element of the 24th Marines went to Camp Pendleton. 3/24 flew to Camp Lejuene, North Carolina, where they undertook weapons firing and chemical warfare training. The regiment (minus 1/24 who were deployed to Okinawa) then flew into Al Jubayl, Saudi Arabia, on January 1, 1991. Throughout that month, the 24th Marines assumed the rear area security mission for I MEF. Lieutenant General Walter Boomer, Commanding General of I Marine Expeditionary Force (MEF), assigned the 24th Marine Regiment the mission to defend the sprawling Al Jubayl Vital Area and other key points from Iraqi military and terrorist attacks. Al Jubayl was the port of entry for the prepositioned supplies that were linked with the 7th MEB in August 1990. The Al Jubayl command post, known as the "Police Station," was under the command of Major General John Hopkins. Colonel Germann (24th Marine Regiment Commanding Officer) deployed his regiment in platoon and company defensive positions along a 200-mile line from Dhahran to Al Mishab, shifting them as requirements changed.

=== Post Desert Storm ===
Companies from 3/24 deployed to Guantanamo Bay, Cuba, from October – November 1994 in support of Operation Sea Signal (Joint Task Force 160) to provide refugee camp security at Camp Alpha, Camp Bravo, Camp Golf, Camp Mike and Camp X-Ray. 3/24 also served as a Quick Reaction Force to quell any refugee uprisings, built refugee housing camp facilities, escorted refugees for medical treatment, distributed food and supplies, and conducted perimeter security.

In 1997, the 24th Marine Regiment began deploying reinforced companies to Panama. Their mission was to provide security for the Panama Canal. Companies of 3/24 and individual augments deployed to Panama providing Op Tempo relief until the canal came under full Panamanian control in 1999. Major General Ray Smith, Commanding General II MEF, saw the deployment as offering great opportunities for both the reserve and the Marine Corps as a whole. "It reinforces the total-force commitment of the reserves. It gives the active duty Marines here a good feeling about their reserve counterparts," said Smith, "and further, this representative unit is a better manned... company than anything we've seen out here, except for the MEUs [Marine Expeditionary Units], in the time I've been here."

=== Global War on Terror (Iraq/Afghanistan) ===
[Camp Fallujah, Iraq] marines from India Company, 3/24, pay their respects to Cpl Brad McCormick, killed in action in Fallujah, Iraq (2004)

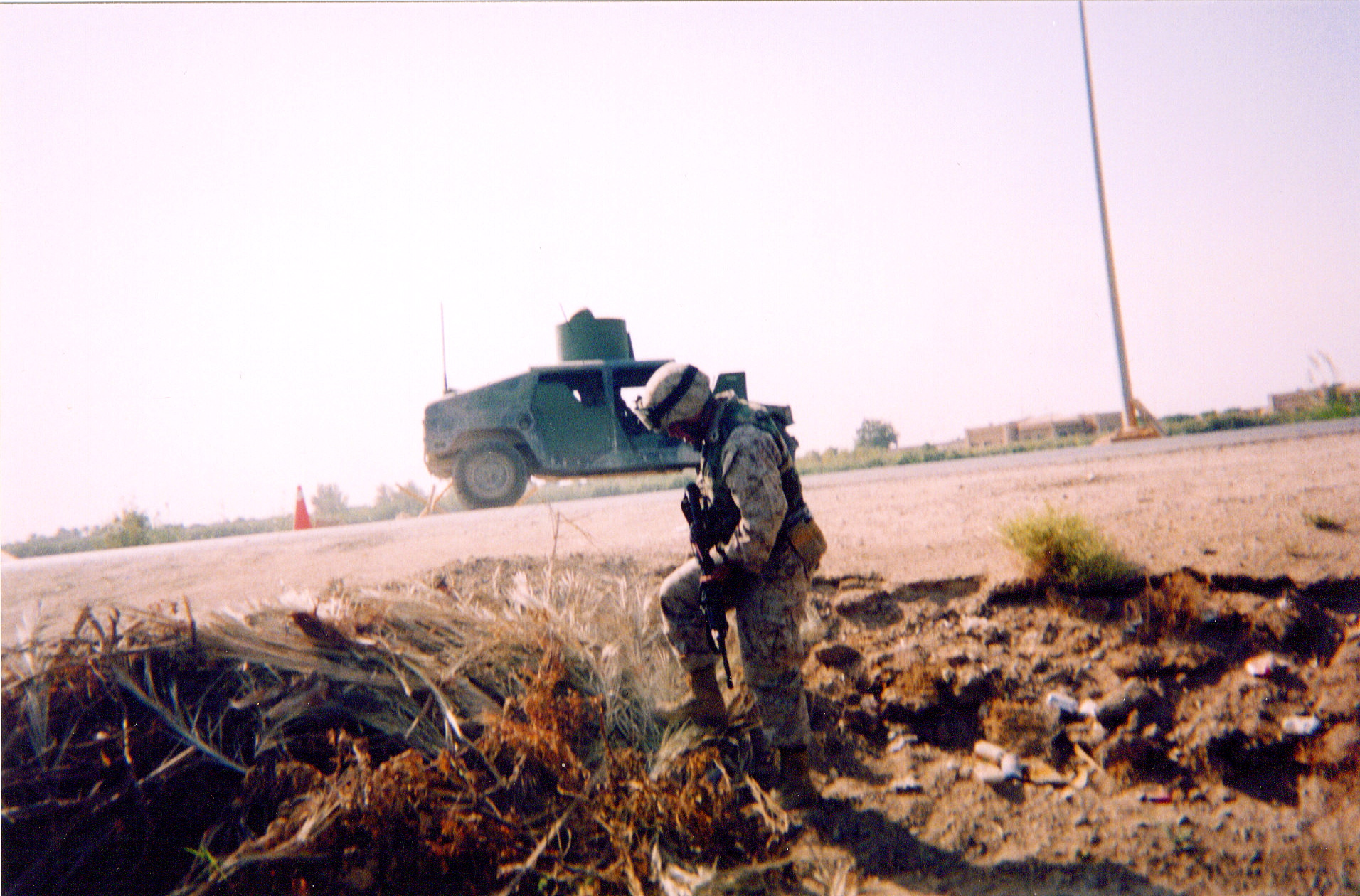
A marine from 3/24 searches for roadside bombs in the vicinity of Fallujah, Iraq (2004)

==== Iraq, OIF II, First Battle of Fallujah ====
During January 2004, the battalion was activated in support of Operation Enduring Freedom. 3/24 was tasked with relieving elements of the U.S. Army's 82nd Airborne Division engaged in counter-insurgency operations in Iraq. 3/24 was deployed to four different Forward Operating Bases in the Sunni Triangle area of Western Iraq with the 1st Marine Division (commanded by General James Mattis), which was under I Marine Expeditionary Force (commanded by General James T. Conway). The battalion was spread out between FOB Abu Ghraib, Camp Fallujah, AL Asad Airbase, and Al Taqaddum where 3/24 was headquartered during the deployment. Elements of the unit participated in the First Battle of Fallujah, the Battle of Najaf, and saw combat in Haditha and the Triangle of Death (Iraq). In August, 2004, 3/24 conducted relief-in-place with 2nd Battalion, 10th Marines. In January 2005, after returning to the United States, the battalion demobilized in St. Louis, Missouri.

==== Iraq, OIF II, Abu Ghraib Prison ====
In February 2004, marines from 3/24 Company K were deployed to Abu Ghraib prison. As a result of the Abu Ghraib torture and prisoner abuse in 2003, they replaced the existing National Guard units.

Global media coverage of the 2003 torture activities provoked a violent response by Iraqis in Baghdad. Following exposure of the events, Abu Ghraib was under attack nearly every day, mainly from IED, car bomb and mortor attempts.

The marines sent to Abu Ghraib were primarily from the Terre Haute, Indiana area.

==== Fallujah ====
In 2006, approximately 400 members of 3/24 augmented 1st Battalion 24th Marines and deployed to Fallujah, Iraq. 1/24 took heavy casualties, suffering 22 marines killed in action with another 331 wounded, including 41 amputees. Due to their relentless aggression, toward the end of their deployment attacks had decreased dramatically. 1/24 was able to turn over the majority of the city to the Fallujah Police and Iraqi Army.

==== South America 2007 ====
In June 2007, elements of 3/24 along with the 24th Marine Regiment Headquarters deployed to Peru as Special Purpose Marine Air Ground Task Force 24 (SPMAGTF 24) for Annual Training. They trained with partner nation marines from Argentina, Brazil, Chile, Colombia, Ecuador, Mexico, Paraguay, Peru, Uruguay, and soldiers from the Canadian Army as a part of Partnership of the Americas (POA) 2010.

==== Operation Iraqi Freedom 2009 ====
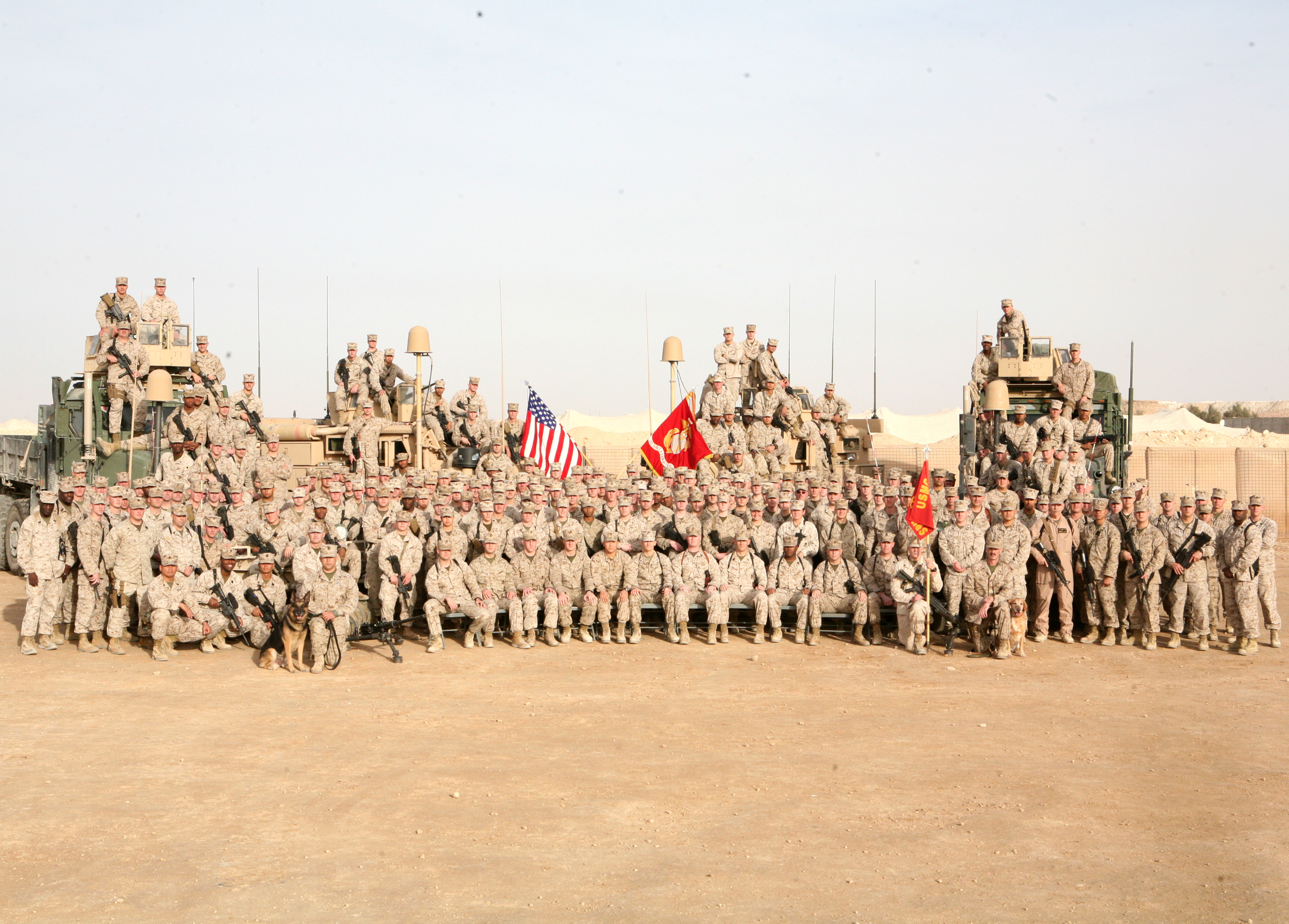
Task Force 3/24 in Al Anbar Province, Iraq (2009)

3/24 again deployed to Iraq in September 2009 with the 2nd Marine Division under the II Marine Expeditionary Force (commanded by General Dennis Hejlik). 3/24 conducted a relief-in-place with 3rd Battalion, 3rd Marines, and Regimental Combat Team 8 (8th Marine Regiment), taking over counter-insurgency operations in Al Anbar, Iraq. Organized as a Task Force, 3/24 was supported by attachments from the 25th Marine Regiment, 4th Tank Battalion, 4th Medical Battalion (United States Marine Corps) and 9 female marines from Comm Co, 4th MARDIV (first Female United States marines to deploy with an infantry battalion). During their time in Iraq they were responsible for providing military police and convoy security along with training Iraqi forces as TFMP (Task Force Military Police). 3/24 was spread out over 500 miles with elements at Al-Qa'im, Ar Rutba, Al Asad Airbase, Al Taqaddum, and Combat Outposts on the borders with Jordan and Syria. Among other missions, Kilo and India Company were a helo-borne Quick Reaction Force, while Weapons, India, and Lima companies conducted convoys and patrols in the Fallujah and Ramadi areas of operation. The battalion returned home in February 2010. 3/24 has the distinction of being the last Marine Corps combat unit to leave Operation Iraqi Freedom.

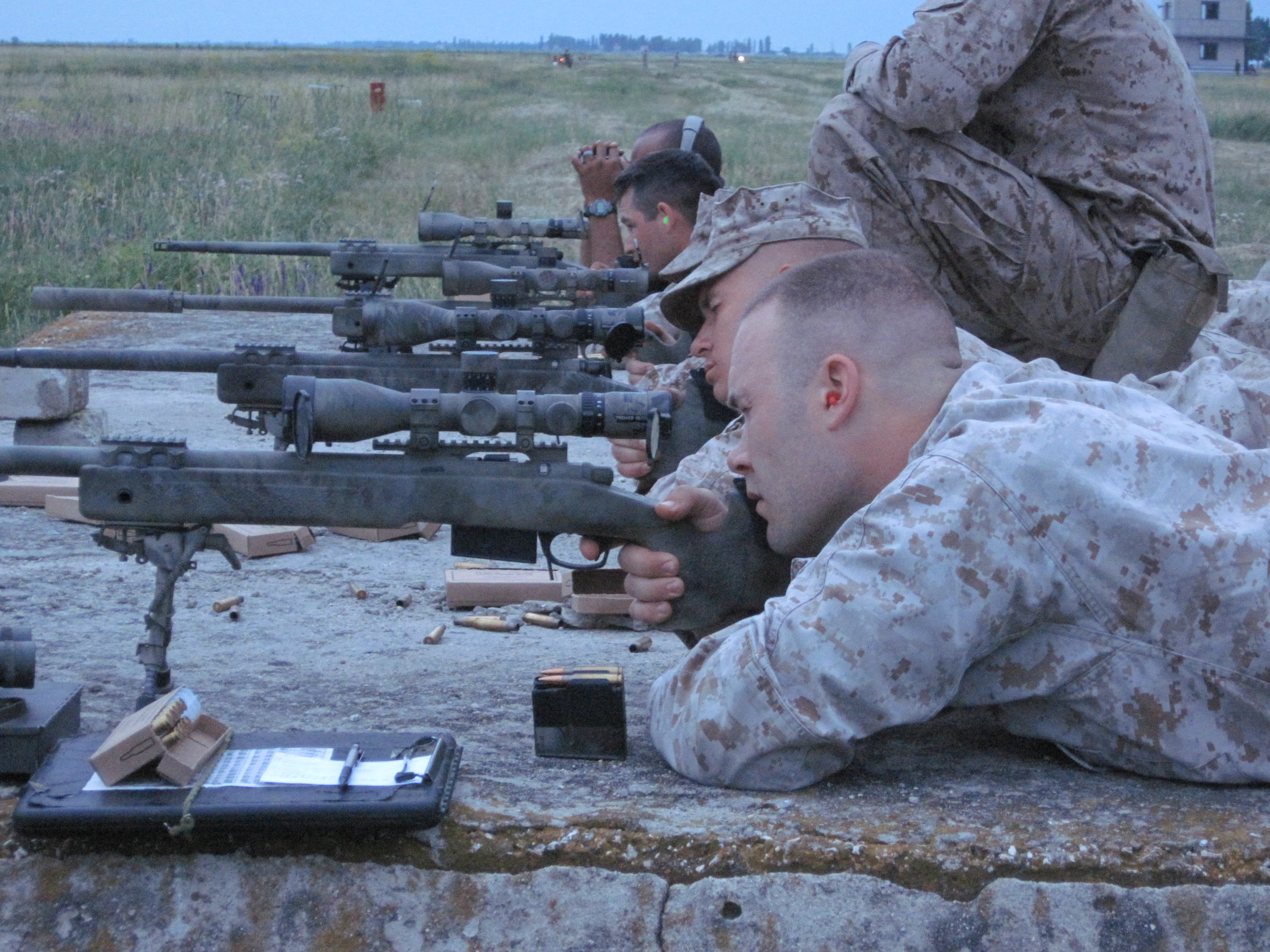
Scout Sniper Platoon, H&S Company, 3/24 conducts joint training in the Black Sea (Ukraine) in support of NATO Partnership For Peace 2011.

==== Operations in Afghanistan ====
200+ marines from 3/24 were deployed to Afghanistan during "the surge" from February–July, 2010, with 2nd Marine Expeditionary Brigade and Marine Expeditionary Brigade-Afghanistan. They were deployed throughout Helmand Province as Military Transition Teams and security detachments. These marines are distinguished in being the last members of 3/24 to serve in a combat zone before the unit was officially retired in 2013. In addition, these marines were awarded the Presidential Unit Citation by President Barack Obama, published by headquarters Marine Corps in administrative message (MARADMIN) 615/12.

==== Black Sea 2011 ====
In May 2011, 3/24 deployed with 4th Force Reconnaissance Company to Ukraine/Black Sea in support of NATO Exercise Sea Breeze 2011. Training consisted of combat firing, counter piracy training operations, non-combatant evacuation operations, amphibious assault, airborne operations, and board, search and seizure training aboard ship.

==== Arctic Circle 2012 ====
In March and April 2012, elements of 3/24 deployed to Norway/Arctic Circle for Operation Cold Response 2012. The Arctic exercise brought together 16,300 troops from 15 allied nations for simulated combat, terror threats and amphibious operations in snow and ice.

=== Deactivation/retirement ===
On May 19, 2013, the battalion was deactivated (retired) as a part of 2013 Marine Corps Force Restructuring, along with the 24th Marine Regiment. 3/24 personnel were reallocated to 23rd Marine Regiment, with the majority of the companies becoming 3rd Battalion, 23rd Marines. The battalion colors were retired at the battalion headquarters in St. Louis, MO, and sent for safekeeping to the Museum of the Marine Corps.

== Unit awards ==
- Presidential Unit Citation
- Navy Unit Commendation with two Bronze Stars (I MEF Gulf War 1991, I MEF Iraq 2004, II MEF Iraq 2009)
  3/24, 1st Marine Division, 1st Marine Expeditionary Force (I MEF), Navy Unit Commendation (NUC) (Unit Award Citation) 2004, Iraq
- National Defense Medal with two Bronze Stars
- Asiatic-Pacific Campaign Medal with four Bronze Stars
- World War II Victory Medal
- Southwest Asia Service Medal with two Bronze Stars (Desert Shield, Desert Storm)
- Global War on Terrorism Expeditionary Medal
- Global War on Terrorism Service Medal
- Iraq Campaign Medal with three Bronze Stars ("Transition of Iraq", "Iraqi Governance", "Iraqi Sovereignty")
- Afghanistan Campaign Medal with one Bronze Star
- Armed Forces Expeditionary Medal
- Kuwait Liberation (Saudi Arabia)
- Kuwait Liberation (Kuwait)

== Notable former members ==
- Private Richard K. Sorenson received the Medal of Honor for actions during the battle of Kwajalein Atoll (Marshall Islands) in 1944.
- First Lieutenant John V. Power received the Medal of Honor for actions during the landing and battle of Roi-Namur Island, 1944.
- Homer Litzenberg, commanding officer
- Private First Class James R. Zarillo received the Navy Cross for actions during the battle of Kwajalein Atoll (Marshall Islands) in 1944.
- Private First Class Louis W. Trafton from India Company, 3/24, received the Navy Cross for actions during the battle of Saipan in 1944.
- First Lieutenant Wray C. Lewis received the Navy Cross for actions during the battle of Saipan in 1944.
- Captain William Ketcham received the Navy Cross for actions during the battle of Iwo Jima in 1945.
- Warrant Officer Ira Davidson received the Navy Cross for actions during the battle of Iwo Jima in 1945.
- Lance Corporal William Spencer from India Company, 3/24, was awarded the Silver Star for action in Fallujah, Iraq, (attached to 1/24) in 2006.
- Corporal Joshua Bleill from Kilo, 3/24, is a double-amputee from wounds sustained in Fallujah, Iraq, in 2006. He is now a PR spokesman for the Indianapolis Colts and authored a book titled One Step at a Time: A Young Marine's Story of Courage, Hope and a New Life in the NFL.
- Private First Class Lee Marvin, Academy Award winning actor.

== See also ==
- List of United States Marine Corps battalions
- Organization of the United States Marine Corps
