= Otto Lessing =

Otto Lessing may refer to:

- Otto Lessing (sculptor) (1846–1912), German sculptor and designer
- Otto Lessing (general) (1904–2002), US Marine major general
