= Homer Litzenberg =

United States Marine Corps general (1903–1963)

Homer L. Litzenberg Jr.
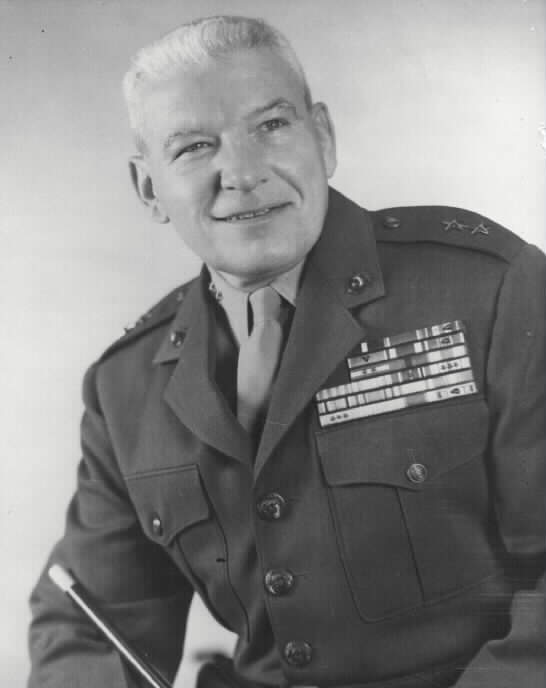
- Nickname: "Blitzen Litzen"
- Born: January 8, 1903; Steelton, Pennsylvania, U.S.
- Died: June 27, 1963 (aged 60)
- Allegiance: United States of America
- Branch: Pennsylvania National Guard; United States Marine Corps
- Service years: 1922–1959
- Rank: Lieutenant General
- Commands: 3rd Battalion 24th Marines; 6th Marine Regiment; 7th Marine Regiment; Inspector General; Camp Lejeune; MCRD Parris Island
- Conflicts: Banana Wars; Occupation of Haiti; Occupation of Nicaragua; World War II; Operation Torch; Battle of Kwajalein; Battle of Tinian; Battle of Saipan; Korean War; Battle of Inchon; Battle of Chosin Reservoir
- Awards: Navy Cross; Distinguished Service Cross; Silver Star (3); Legion of Merit

Homer Laurence Litzenberg (January 8, 1903 – June 27, 1963) was a decorated lieutenant general in the United States Marine Corps, serving in Haiti, World War II, and the Korean War. His final rank was awarded at his retirement for valor in battle. He retired from the post of Inspector General of the Marine Corps on May 31, 1959, after more than 37 years of service. Litzenberg is best known for commanding the 7th Marine Regiment during the Battle of Chosin Reservoir.

== Biography ==
=== Early years ===
Litzenberg was born in 1903 in Steelton, Pennsylvania. He graduated from high school in Philadelphia and served two years in the Pennsylvania National Guard.

Litzenberg began his Marine Corps career as an enlisted Marine, graduating from the Marine Corps Recruit Depot Parris Island on October 5, 1922, as a private. After a tour of duty in Haiti, he was commissioned a second lieutenant on 19 February 1925. He served in expeditionary duty in Nicaragua in 1928 and 1929; and with Marine detachments aboard the USS Idaho (BB-24), USS Augusta (CA-31), USS Arkansas (BB-33), USS Arizona (BB-39) and USS New Mexico (BB-40).

He graduated from the U.S. Army Infantry School at Fort Benning, Georgia in 1933, and subsequently served for two years as Advisor-Instructor of a Marine Reserve battalion in Philadelphia. He then spent two years in Guam as aide to the governor, head of the police department, and inspector-instructor of the Guam Militia. From 1938 to 1943, and again from September 1944 to May 1946, he served in Washington, D.C., in the War Plans Sections of the offices of the Chief of Naval Operations, the commander in chief, United States Fleet, and the Joint Chiefs of Staff.

=== World War II ===
At the beginning of World War II, Major Litzenberg was assigned to Headquarters, Commander in Chief, U.S. Fleet, and served in England during combined planning with the British on the conduct of the war. He also participated in the amphibious assault on Casablanca, French Morocco in November 1942.

After his return to the United States, General Litzenberg organized and commanded the 3rd Battalion, 24th Marines, 4th Marine Division. He later served as regimental executive officer during the assault on Roi-Namur, Kwajalein Atoll, Marshall Islands, where he earned his first Silver Star. In March 1944, he joined the V Amphibious Corps as assistant operations officer, and participated in the Battle of Saipan and Battle of Tinian.

=== Post-War years - Korea ===
In June 1946, the general was assigned to the staff of commander, Seventh Fleet, and served as Seventh Fleet liaison officer with General of the Army George C. Marshall and the Chinese Ministry of Defense in Nanking, China, until February 1947, when he became plans officer and Marine officer on the staff of commander, Naval Forces Western Pacific. He returned to Washington in August 1948 to attend the National War College, and in May 1949 was named commanding officer of the 6th Marine Regiment, 2nd Marine Division, at Marine Corps Base Camp Lejeune, North Carolina. At Marine Corps Base Camp Pendleton, California, on August 17, 1950, he formed and assumed command of the 7th Marine Regiment, which sailed for duty in Korea on September 1, 1950. While in Korea, Litzenberg's 7th Marines took part in the Battle of Inchon and the Battle of Chosin Reservoir, for which he was awarded the Navy Cross.

=== Post-Korean War ===
General Litzenberg returned to the United States in April 1951 and was assigned duties at Marine Corps Headquarters, Washington. In December of the same year, he was named Legal Aide and Legislative Counsel to the Commandant. Later he served as director of the Marine Corps Development Center at Quantico, Virginia; as assistant division commander, 3rd Marine Division, in Japan; and as assistant to the force commander, Fleet Marine Force, Atlantic. In October 1954, he was named Inspector General of the Marine Corps, and held this post at Headquarters Marine Corps, Washington, for thirteen months.

The general served next as commanding general, Marine Corps Base Camp Lejeune, North Carolina, from December 1, 1955, until May 11, 1956, and then as commanding general, Marine Corps Recruit Depot Parris Island, South Carolina, from May 12, 1956, until March 15, 1957, when he returned to Korea. There, he served as senior member of the United Nations Command component of the Military Armistice Commission, negotiating with the Communists at Panmunjom. On his return from Korea, he was assigned his last tour of duty at Headquarters Marine Corps on December 7, 1957, as Inspector General of the Marine Corps, serving in this capacity until his retirement on May 31, 1959.

General Litzenberg completed the following service schools: Marine Corps Basic School, 1925; Infantry School, Fort Benning, Georgia, 1933; Command and General Staff School, Fort Leavenworth, Kansas, 1938; and the National War College, 1949.

His various ranks and the dates on which he was promoted are:

- second lieutenant, February 1925
- first lieutenant, March 1931
- captain, March 1936
- major, June 1940
- lieutenant colonel, May 1942
- colonel, May 1944
- brigadier general, July 1, 1951
- major general, July 1, 1954 (date of rank: July 1, 1951)
- lieutenant general on the retired list, May 31, 1959.

Litzenberg died of cancer on June 27, 1963, and is buried at Arlington National Cemetery.

There is a suite named in his honor at the bachelor officer quarters at Marine Corps Base Camp Lejeune.

== Awards ==
Litzenberg's decorations include:

Navy Cross		Distinguished Service Cross	Silver Star w/ 1 award star & 1 oak leaf cluster
Legion of Merit w/ valor device	Navy and Marine Corps Commendation Medal	Army Commendation Medal w/ 1 oak leaf cluster	Navy Presidential Unit Citation w/ 2 service stars
Marine Corps Good Conduct Medal	Marine Corps Expeditionary Medal	Nicaraguan Campaign Medal (1933)	China Service Medal
American Defense Service Medal	American Campaign Medal	European-African-Middle Eastern Campaign Medal w/ 1 service star	Asiatic-Pacific Campaign Medal w/ 3 service stars
World War II Victory Medal	Navy Occupation Service Medal	National Defense Service Medal	Korean Service Medal w/ 3 service stars
Special Breast Order of Yun Hui	Order of Military Merit, Taeguk Cordon Medal	Korean Presidential Unit Citation w/ service star	United Nations Korea Medal

== See also ==
- List of Navy Cross recipients for the Korean War

Military offices
Preceded by John H. Cook Jr.	Commanding Officer of the 6th Marine Regiment; October 17, 1949 – July 7, 1950	Succeeded by Russell N. Jordhal
Preceded by Unit reactivated	Commanding Officer of the 7th Marine Regiment; August 17, 1950 – April 15, 1951	Succeeded by Herman Nickerson Jr.

== Bibliography ==
- Drury, Bob; Clavin, Tom (2009). The Last Stand of Fox Company. New York, N.Y.: Grove Press. ISBN 978-0-8021-4451-5
