= 24th Marine Regiment (United States) =

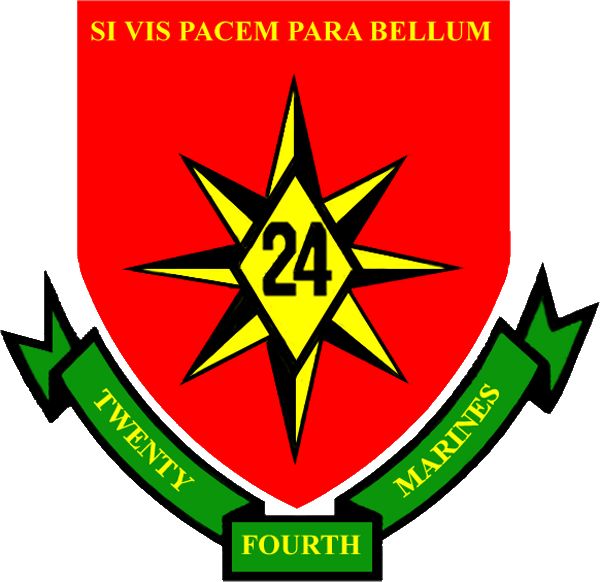
- 24th Marine Regiment Insignia
- Active: 1943 – 2013
- Country: United States of America
- Branch: United States Marine Corps
- Type: Infantry
- Size: 3,500
- Part of: 4th Marine Division
- Garrison/HQ: Kansas City, Missouri
- Motto(s): Si vis pacem para bellum
- Engagements: World War II: Battle of Kwajalein; Battle of Saipan; Battle of Tinian; Battle of Iwo Jima; Operation Desert Storm; Iraq War

Commanders
- Notable commanders: Franklin A. Hart

The 24th Marine Regiment (24th Marines) was one of three infantry regiments in the 4th Marine Division of the United States Marine Corps. The 24 Marine Regiment's last headquarters, before being deactivated on 9 September 2013, was in Kansas City, Missouri.

== Subordinate units before deactivation ==
Name	Last Location
1st Battalion, 24th Marines (1/24)	Detroit, Michigan
2nd Battalion, 24th Marines (2/24)	Chicago, Illinois
3rd Battalion, 24th Marines (3/24)	Bridgeton, Missouri

1/24 passed to 25th Marine Regiment, while 2/24 passed to 23rd Marine Regiment and 3/24 was disbanded.

== History ==
=== World War II ===
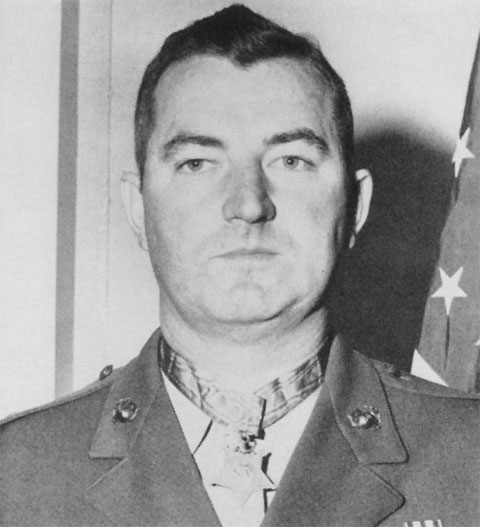
Captain McCarthy (Medal of Honor) company commander of G Co. 2/24. He landed on Yellow Beach 2 alongside the 23rd Marines. On D+3 the 24th RCT relieved the 25th

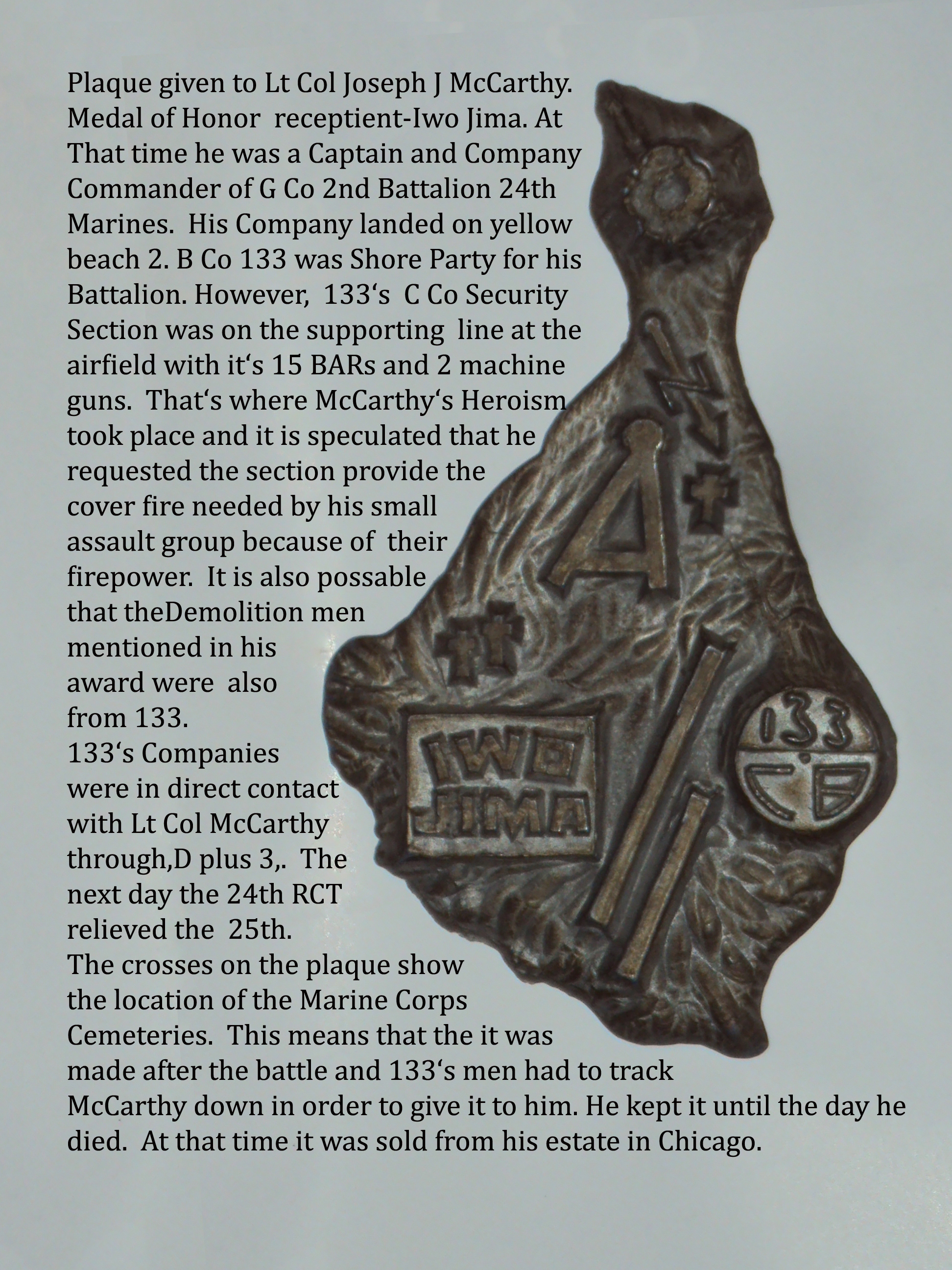
133 Plaque from the estate of Lt Col Joseph J. McCarthy and is zinc.

The 24th Marine Regiment was activated at Marine Corps Base Camp Pendleton, California on 26 March 1943. All three battalions were organized at Marine Corps Base Camp Lejeune, North Carolina prior to activation of the Regimental Headquarters. 1st Battalion, 24th Marines formed on 19 October 1942; 2nd Battalion, 24th Marines on 20 January 1943; 3rd Battalion, 24th Marines on 1 February 1943. In August of that same year the regiment was attached to the newly created 4th Marine Division.

The regiment began movement to the combat zone in January 1944 when it sailed from San Diego, California for the enemy held Marshall Islands. The first combat assignment for the regiment was to take part in the seizure of Roi-Namur, twin islands in the Kwajalein Atoll. On 1 February, the regiment assaulted Namur. The 2d and 3d Battalions led the attack. On moving inland the regiment met strong resistance. Second Battalion suffered especially heavy casualties, primarily due to the explosion of an enemy ammunition dump. The island was completely wrested from the Japanese by the following day. The 24th Marines reembarked and sailed for Hawaii two days later. While stationed there, 24th Marines took part in the preparations for the invasion of the Mariana Islands.

Saipan was the first objective of the Mariana Island Campaign for the regiment. The 24th Marines were originally placed in reserve. However, heavy fighting on the day of the landing, 15 June 1944, forced the call-up of the regiment. 24th Marines went ashore that afternoon joining other Marine units from the 2nd Marine Division and 4th Marine Divisions in pushing inland. The Japanese stubbornly resisted the invading Americans until 9 July when the island was declared secure. (Academy Award-winning actor Lee Marvin was a member of "I" Company, 24th Marines, and was seriously wounded in the assault against a Japanese salient on 18 June 1944.)

American military forces in the Marianas next turned their attention to the neighboring island of Tinian. The 24th Marines had a leading role in the campaign to seize Tinian. The regiment was in the first wave to hit the beaches. Enemy opposition was quickly overcome and the 24th Marines rapidly moved inland. By 1 August organized resistance had ended with the island under American control. The regiment returned to Hawaii at the end of the month.

In Hawaii, the 24th Marines received replacements for losses suffered in the Marianas and started training for its toughest battle of World War II - Iwo Jima. In late January 1945, the 24th Marines embarked for the Japanese stronghold, landing on 19 February, with other 4th Marine Division units. A Co 24th replacement draft was attached to A Co 133rd Naval Construction Battalion as shore party to 1/23 on beach yellow 1 for the landing D-day. B Co. 24th replacement draft was attached to B Co. 133rd CB on beach yellow 2. C Co. 24th replacement draft was attached to C Co. 133rd CB as yellow (sp) reserve. The record has 1/24 moving forward the same time as 1/23. From the beginning of the operation the 24th Marines were heavily engaged, often in hand-to-hand combat. The 24th Marines were assigned to drive to the O-1 line and clear the airfield.

On 21 February 1945, the 4th Marine Division was engaged with strong enemy emplacements encircling Motoyama Airfield #1. It consisted of multiple lines of defense belts as a major complex on Iwo Jima's central plateau. Six pillboxes with mortars in support held up the 1st Battalion, 24th Marines' attack across the airfield, inflicting many casualties. Two M4 shermans went forward to knock out the pillboxes. The tanks both hit landmines and were put out of action. Maj. Paul Treitel, commander of 1/24, needed support to destroy the pillboxes.

Gunner Ira Davidson reported to the battalion command post. Maj Treitel asked him, "Could you get at those pillboxes with a 37?" The gunner nodded and moved out. Under mortar and machine gun fire, Davidson crossed the exposed airfield and headed back to his platoon assembly area. He ordered one of his 37mm sections into action. Davidson and six of his Marines manhandled their 900-pound gun across 200 yards of fire-swept ground. One of the crew was killed, two were wounded, and another shell-shocked. Once in position, Davidson took the controls of his gun. Siting in, he engaged each pillbox in turn with 12-15 high explosive rounds each. Under a continuous mortar barrage, Davidson kept shooting until advancing Marines masked his arc of fire. The infantry Marines moved up and secured the enemy defensive complex. Clearing the pillboxes, they found dead Japanese troops in each. Davidson had fired so accurately, he was able to put rounds through the pillboxes' apertures. For his actions on Iwo Jima, Davidson was later awarded the Navy Cross.

Capt. Joseph J. McCarthy would receive the Medal of Honor for his pillbox actions at the airfield also

The last pocket of enemy resistance was finally crushed on 16 March. The regiment was relieved two days later and immediately embarked for the return to Camp Maui. The regiment's casualties were 652 killed and 1053 wounded.

=== Regiment's Commanders ===
- Lieutenant Colonel Maxwell H. Mizell (26 March 1943 – 9 April 1943)
- Lieutenant Colonel Orin H. Wheeler (10 April 1943 – 11 June 1943)
- Colonel Franklin A. Hart (12 June 1943 – 30 August 1944)
- Lieutenant Colonel Austin R. Brunelli (31 August 1944 – 6 September 1944)
- Colonel Walter I. Jordan (7 September 1944 – 31 October 1945)

=== Post World War II ===
The 24th Marines remained in Hawaii until October when it was ordered back to California, where it was deactivated on 31 October 1945. In 1962 the Marine Corps Reserve began a reorganization process which eventually led to the formation of the 4th Marine Division/Wing Concept. The three battalions of 24th Marines were activated on 1 July 1962. The regimental headquarters was not reactivated until 1 February 1966.

=== Operation Desert Storm / First Gulf War ===
In November 1990, the 24th Marines were activated for participation in Operation Desert Shield. Initially, the regiment deployed to Camp Pendleton, California for work-up training. In January 1991, demonstrating the flexibility of the regiment, 1st Battalion deployed to Okinawa, Japan, for duty with the 3rd Marine Division. The remainder of the 24th Marines deployed to Saudi Arabia for duty with I Marine Expeditionary Force units in support of operations against enemy forces in Kuwait. From 16 January to 28 February, the 24th Marines participated in Operation Desert Storm. In April, the regiment redeployed to the United States. In August, the 1st Battalion redeployed from Okinawa to Detroit.

=== Global War on Terror ===
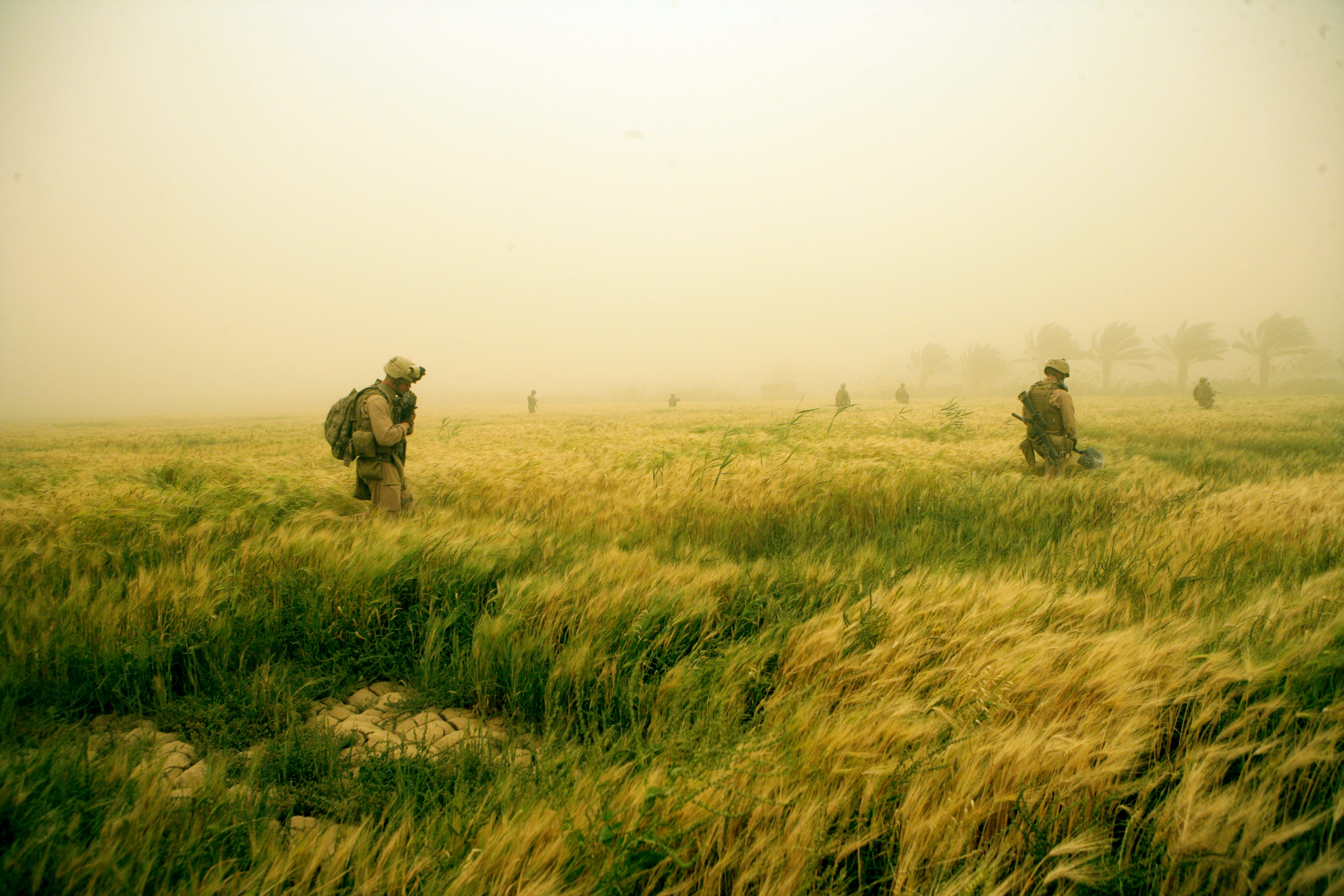
Marines from the 24th Marine Regiment search a field for weapons caches during a dust storm in Khalidiyah, Iraq on 17 April 2008

Though not deployed as an entire regiment, battalions from the regiment (1/24, 2/24, and 3/24) augmented active-duty regiments and deployed to the War in Iraq for the initial invasion in 2003 (1/24), and Al Anbar, Iraq in 2004 (3/24), 2004-2005 (2/24), 2006-2007 (1/24), 2007-2008 (2/24), and 2009-2010 (3/24). 3/24 was the last Marine battalion in Iraq.

In addition, elements of 24th Marine Regiment Headquarters Company deployed to Africa and Afghanistan in support of Operation Enduring Freedom on a rotational basis from 2003–2012.

In June, 2007, and again in June 2010, 24th Marine Regiment deployed to Peru, South America as Special Purpose Marine Air Ground Task Force 24 (SPMAGTF 24). They trained with partner nation Marines from Argentina, Brazil, Chile, Colombia, Ecuador, Mexico, Paraguay, Peru, Uruguay, and soldiers from the Canadian Army as a part of Partnership of the Americas (POA) 2010.

=== Deactivation ===
The regiment was deactivated on 9 September 2013 in a ceremony at its headquarters in Kansas City, Missouri. The Marines and equipment of the headquarters element now constitute the newly created Combat Logistics Regiment 4.

== See also ==
- List of United States Marine Corps regiments
