= 1st Battalion, 24th Marines =

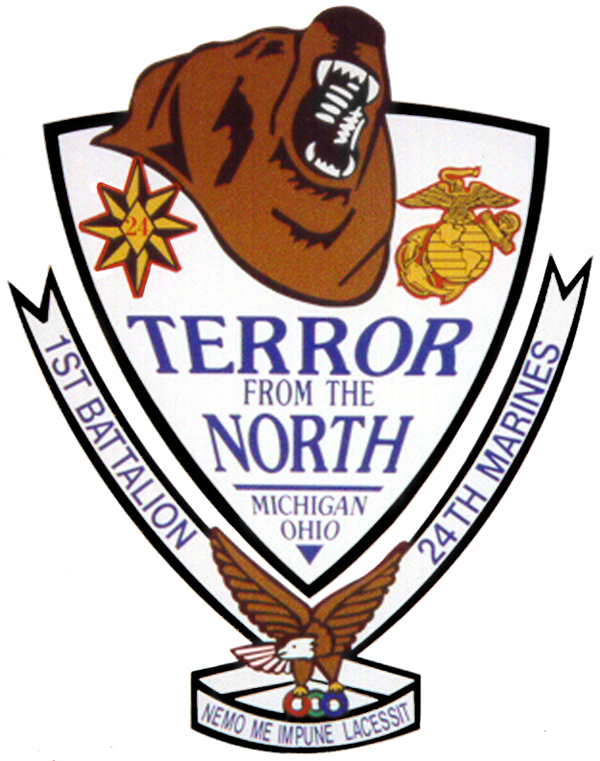
- 1st Battalion, 24th Marine Regiment insignia
- Active: 5 July 1922
- Country: United States of America
- Branch: United States Marine Corps
- Type: Infantry Battalion
- Role: Locate, close with and destroy the enemy by fire and maneuver, and to repel the enemy's assault by fire and close combat.
- Size: 896 Marines & 69 Sailors
- Part of: 24th Marine Regiment; 4th Marine Division
- Garrison/HQ: Detroit, Michigan
- Nickname: "Terror from the North"
- Mottos: "Nemo Me Impune Lacessit" "No one cuts me with impunity"
- Engagements: World War II; *Battle of Kwajalein; *Battle of Tinian; *Battle of Saipan; *Battle of Iwo Jima; Korean War; Operation Desert Storm; Operation Fiery Vigil; Operation Enduring Freedom; Operation Iraqi Freedom

Commanders
- Current commander: LtCol David A. Moran
- Notable commanders: Aquilla J. Dyess; Austin R. Brunelli

1st Battalion, 24th Marines (1/24) is a reserve infantry battalion in the United States Marine Corps located throughout Michigan, Ohio, and Indiana consisting of approximately 1,000 Marines and sailors. Nicknamed Terror from the North, the battalion is attached to the 25th Marine Regiment of the 4th Marine Division.

== Current units ==
Name	Location
Headquarters and Service Company	Selfridge ANGB, Michigan
Alpha Company	Battle Creek, Michigan
Bravo Company "Bruin"	Terre Haute, Indiana
Charlie Company	Lansing, Michigan
Weapons Company	Perrysburg, Ohio

== Mission ==
Provide trained combat and combat support personnel and units to augment and reinforce the active component in time of war, national emergency, and at other times as national security requires; and have the capability to reconstitute the Division, if required.

== History ==
On July 5, 1922, the Marines first came to Detroit when a volunteer Marine Corps Reserve company was activated with a strength of 70 men. In 1926 the company designated as the 306th Company of the Fleet Marine Force (FMF) Reserve before being redesignated in 1929 as Company "B" of the 8th Reserve Battalion, headquartered in Toledo, Ohio.

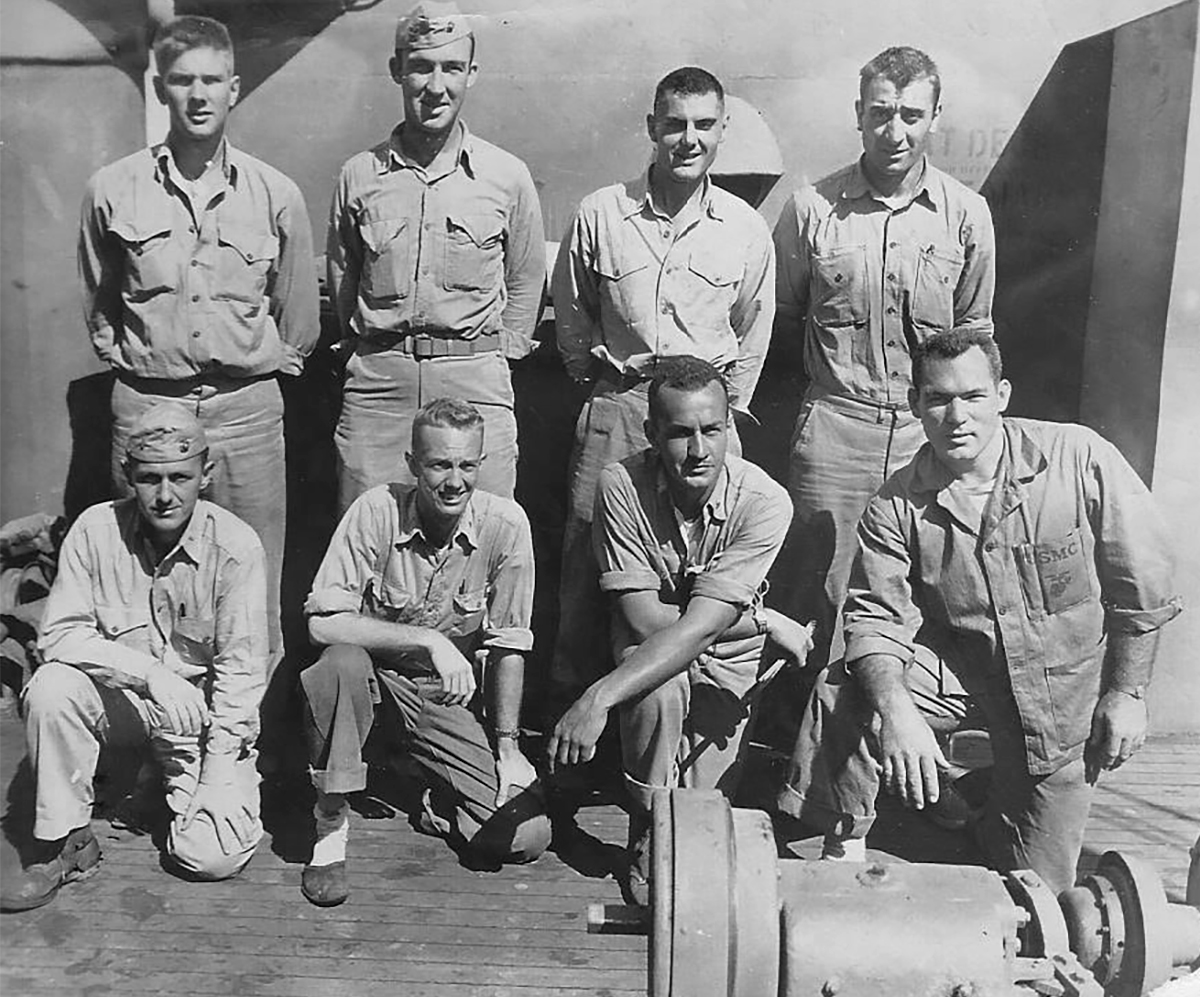
Captain George D. Webster and officers of D Company, 1st Battalion, 24th Marines, February 1944

In October 1938, Detroit became the home of a second company of Marines, Company "D" of the 8th Reserve Battalion. Shortly thereafter, in November 1940, the 8th Reserve Battalion was mobilized as an individual active duty battalion before being integrated into the First Marine Brigade in January 1941. As part of the First Marine Brigade, the battalion fought valiantly in World War II in the South Pacific.

During the Battle of Iwo Jima in February 1945, 1st Battalion suffered heavy casualties, but Lieutenant Colonel Austin R. Brunelli quickly reorganized the unit and led it to victory.

In August 1946, the battalion was formed into the 17th Infantry Battalion. Four years later, the reservists of the 1st Battalion were mobilized and reported to Camp Pendleton, California, where many joined the units of the 1st Marine Division in Korea in the fall and winter of 1950.

In July 1962, the Marines became Headquarters & Service Company of the 1st Battalion, 24th Marine Regiment when the 4th Marine Division was reactivated. 1/24 was mobilized for nine months in support of Operation Desert Shield in December 1990 for the first time since 1954. The unit was sent to Okinawa and the Philippines where they were the first USMC battalion qualified as “Special Operations Ready” and then assisted in rescue operations associated with the eruption of Mount Pinatubo.

=== Global War on Terror ===
In support of Operation Enduring Freedom during 2003, 1/24 saw the mobilization of companies A, B, and C reinforced with platoons from Weapons company and small elements of H&S company. Company A along with Heavy Machinegun Platoon went to Camp Lemonnier, Djibouti, Horn of Africa. Company B, reinforced by 81mm Mortar Platoon went to support security operations in Kuwait. Company C and the Battalion's Javelin Platoon supported security operations in Southern Iraq.

Until 2005, the battalion was based at Brodhead Armory which is an historic building that has served in various capacities over the years. It has served as a submarine base for the United States Navy, a union hall for the Teamsters in the Jimmy Hoffa era, and a professional boxing arena for Joe Louis and other famous boxers.

The battalion headquarters and its subordinate Headquarters and Service Company relocated to Selfridge Air National Guard (SANGB) Base in 2005. SANGB is a joint base which accommodates all branches of the armed forces and is located roughly 35 miles (56 km) north of Detroit.

In April 2006, the battalion began training in Michigan and Camp Pendleton, California, to prepare for deployment to Iraq's Al Anbar Governorate. The battalion arrived at Camp Baharia in September 2006. Alpha Company operated to the west of the Euphrates River, Bravo Company operated north of Fallujah out of the train station, Charlie Company was the only company to live and operate constantly inside the city limits of Fallujah. Weapons Company and the Headquarters and Support Company operated out of Camp Bahria (also known as "Dreamland"). The battalion would serve for the next seven months with Regimental Combat Team 5 and Regimental Combat Team 6. They replaced 1/25's Area of Operations. During this deployment 1/24 participated in Combat Operations in Fallujah, suffering 22 Marines killed in action with another 331 wounded, including 41 amputees.

==== 2006–2007 Tour in Fallujah, Iraq ====
1st Battalion, 25th Marines turned over its positions in and around Fallujah to another Reserve battalion, 1st Battalion, 24th Marines. Building on the improvements that 1/25 had made to Fallujah's infrastructure and community relations after Operation al Fajr, 1/24 also borrowed the concept of "community policing" from the successful Iraq tour that its sister battalion, 2/24, had employed in the Triangle of Death years earlier. Using aggressive patrolling and intelligence operations that transformed information regarding tribal activities and relationships into "actionable intelligence," 1/24 made major contributions to what has become known as the "Sunni Awakening," or the 180-degree transition of many Sunni tribes in Al Anbar Governorate from supporting the insurgents to supporting the American-led effort in Iraq.

Lt. Col. Harold R. "Odie" Van Opdorp, 2/24's battalion commander, credited much of the battalion’s success to its S-2 section, and how it had closely integrated intelligence on improvised explosive devices and other enemy activities with current operations. For 1/24’s deployment to Fallujah, it recruited two key intelligence officers from 2/24. Capitalizing on their experience and the systems that they had developed in the Babil Province, 1/24 was able to capture and understanding of its area of operations that allowed the Marines to operate in a coordinated and intelligence-driven fashion.

While the Iraqi insurgency might have many parts, for the most part, it was made up of rational and intelligent people. Expressing a level of respect for the shrewdness that insurgents brought to the battle, an understanding by Marines that individual insurgents were rational made the insurgent's activities more predictable. This led to the opportunity for 1/24 to target specific activities. With more than 1,000 Marine intelligence collectors maneuvering constantly throughout the AO, the Intelligence Section's responsibility became collecting the information and plotting the data so that the Intelligence Section could "connect the dots," and push that information out to the using units.

Repeated analysis of the patterns of IEDs led the battalion to innovative ways to avoid them and also prevent them from being employed. The battalion identified the following as its main threats, in order of importance: Improvised explosive devices (IEDs), direct fire (particularly from snipers), indirect fire (typically mortars), vehicle-borne IEDs, a medium-sized attack(such as two dozen insurgents attacking a fixed position), a large-sized counterattack (such as a hundred insurgents joining an attack on a patrol), and a complex attack that might involve several of the previously-described methods. Simplifying the types of threats to a manageable number, then forcing each Marine to "war game" his response to each threat situation, was tremendously valuable because it allowed Marines to respond instinctively.

At this point in the Iraq War, the central and provincial governments were providing enough police and soldiers to provide a significant boost to American efforts. A key decision within 1/24 was to let the Iraqi Police take a leading role in most operations. By asking the Iraqis to take charge of daytime operations and assigning Marines to work under the cover of darkness, 1/24 employed its Marines in a more protected environment while pushing credit for success in Fallujah to local Iraqis.

1/24's concept of victory in Iraq involved building the local police and military forces to the extent that they would be able to counter the insurgency. 1/24 created opportunities for "local heroes," or people within the communities who were willing to stand up to the insurgents and complain about the damage that the insurgents were causing to the community. One of these, he said, was a new Fallujah police chief who was willing to lead the community away from insurgents. Marines said the police chief was just what the city needed. The Marines also said that during 1/24's tour, a group of tribal leaders, or sheiks, were willing to assist the U.S.–Iraqi effort because they had grown weary of the heavy-handed tactics of the insurgents. The willingness of these tribal leaders to provide major assistance in the fight against al Qaeda marked a significant turning point in the war, when Iraqi nationalists were willing to play an important role, in combating al-Qaeda, at a significant risk to their lives and status.

While violence continued in and around Fallujah, Iraqi Security Forces increasingly handled the violence. 1/24 was in what Van Opdorp described as an "overwatch" position on the outskirts of Fallujah, providing assistance when needed. An important breakthrough took place, he said, when Col. Faisal (Iraq Army) asked the Marines to provide a permanent Quick Response Force (QRF) that would be dedicated to supporting Iraqi Police operations. Recognizing the risks, Van Opdorp said that he also recognized that this presented a tremendous opportunity to let the Iraqi Police flex their muscles, so he tasked Bravo Company with providing this force. Maj. Jeffrey M. O'Neill said that the QRF was something like a portable fire station, able to respond immediately if the Iraqi Police got into something that was too large for them to handle. This combination was effective, he said, because the Iraqis knew how to get the information and act quickly on tips, while the Americans had the backup firepower to embolden the Iraqi Police to take measured risks. With Marines providing a cordon and Iraqi Police serving as the assault team, the Iraqis detained 82 suspects in two months. This was a total turnaround, he said, as 1/24 Marines went from being very suspicious of Iraqi Police to working side-by-side with them.

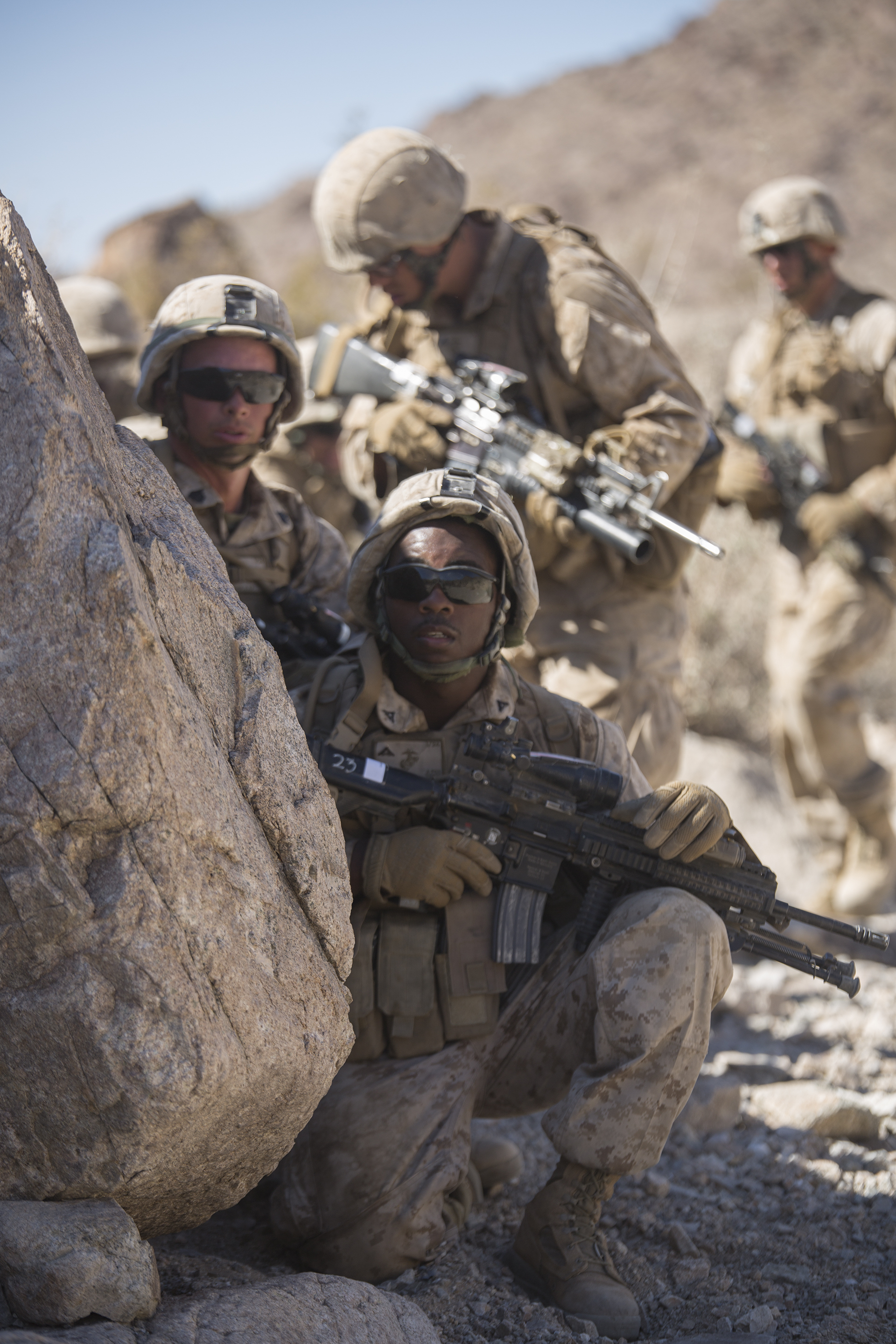
Marines with Company Alpha, 1st Battalion, 24th Marines during a training exercise at Twentynine Palms, California in 2016

The emergence of Iraqi security forces throughout Fallujah allowed the Marines to consider a Civil Affairs "hearts and minds" program that many thought Marines would be doing when they first returned to Iraq in 2004. In this operation, Marines conducted a two-day operation in Sheik Khamis' area that included Civil Affairs Officers, Legal Officers, physicians, and veterinarians. Van Opdorp said the physicians and veterinarians treated hundreds of Iraqis and herds of sheep and cattle. The Legal Officers, he said, made payments for various small claims that Iraqis in that area had against the American forces. The operation was a tremendous success. "When you do something like that ... they come to realize more and more that these guys aren't occupiers, they are just trying to continue to help us so we can help ourselves." Van Opdorp said, "I think that the transition of Fallujah to the 2nd Brigade [of the Iraqi Army] and to the Iraqi Police was a tremendous accomplishment that 1/24 will look at." He credited the 60% reduction in violent acts during his battalion's tenure in Fallujah to the work his Marines did in creating conditions to return responsibility for certain functions to Iraqi control.

Van Opdorp said that the Reserves lived up to their reputations. "I am not sure that an active duty battalion can enjoy the success that we had, because you're not going to have a twenty-eight-year Chicago Police officer dealing with anti-gangs, or a New York City firefighter who has the amazing charisma to go out and conduct the type of things that he did with his CAG detachment, or a former [counter-intelligence] Marine as a company commander who sets up one of the most phenomenal intelligence databases and situational awareness for his AO. These Marines are some of the best that America has to offer, and they just did a phenomenal job."

==== Afghanistan Tour Cancellation 2012 ====
Alpha Company 1/24 completed pre-mobilization training for a deployment to Afghanistan to replace 1st Battalion, 25th Marines in the Helmand and Nimroz Provinces in April 2012. However, the deployment was cancelled.

==== Afghanistan Deployment (October 2017 - April 2018) ====
Alpha Co. 1/24 deployed to Helmand Province, Afghanistan in October, 2017, in support of Task Force Southwest (TFSW). TFSW operated under Operation Freedom's Sentinel (OFS) as part of the Resolute Support Mission. Alpha Co. 1/24 was the second TFSW rotation, relieving Charlie Co. 1st Battalion, 2nd Marines of command. Alpha Co. 1/24's four platoons conducted missions regarding base security, guardian angel, and flight line security in and around the vicinity of Camp Shorabak and COP Bost. In December 2017 a vehicle born IED exploded inside the vehicle checkpoint of COP Bost. The suicide bomber caused multiple Afghan police casualties but none of the Marines in the vicinity of the blast were seriously harmed.

== See also ==
- List of United States Marine Corps battalions
- Organization of the United States Marine Corps
