= Walter Irvine Jordan =

US Marine Corps Colonel, Silver Star recipient

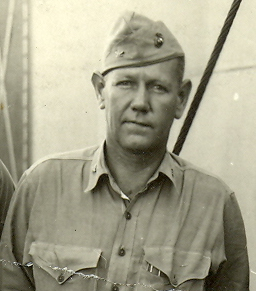
- Born: March 31, 1902; Norfolk, Virginia, US
- Died: October 16, 1947 (aged 45); Virginia Beach, Virginia, US
- Burial place: Arlington National Cemetery
- Spouse: Genevieve Peyton Grimes Jordan (1909-1988)
- Children: Walter Irvine Jordan, Jr. (1936-2014)
- Military career
- Allegiance: United States
- Branch: United States Marine Corps
- Rank: colonel, USMC
- Commands: 24th Marine Regiment; Marine Security Guard, London; 2nd Battalion, 2nd Marines
- Conflicts: World War II; Battle of Tarawa; Battle of Saipan; Battle of Iwo Jima
- Awards: Silver Star; Legion of Merit (2x)

Walter Irvine Jordan (March 31, 1902 – October 16, 1947) was a United States Marine Corps Colonel and Silver Star recipient who served in World War II. He was commander of the first Marine Security Guard at the American embassy in London.

== Military career ==
Jordan was born in Norfolk, Virginia, and attended the Virginia Military Institute, where he was vice president of the Class of 1924. After graduating, he served a tour in Nicaragua and at sea before being assigned to command the Marine Security Guard in London. He was awarded the Silver Star for actions in the Battle of Tarawa, where he was an observer for the 4th Marine Division and served as acting commander of the 2nd Battalion, 2nd Marines, after the death of its battalion commander, Lt. Col. Herbert R. Amey, Jr. He was awarded Legions of Merit at the Battle of Saipan and as commander of the 24th Marine Regiment at the Battle of Iwo Jima.

=== Silver Star citation ===
Citation:

The President of the United States of America takes pride in presenting the Silver Star to Lieutenant Colonel Walter I. Jordan (MCSN: 0-3939), United States Marine Corps, for conspicuous gallantry and intrepidity as an Observer from the FOURTH Marine Division temporarily attached to the SECOND Marine Division, during action against enemy Japanese forces at Tarawa, Gilbert Islands, from 20 to 22 November 1943. With the Commanding Officer of the Second Battalion, Second Marines, SECOND Marine Division, killed and the staff either casualties or in isolated positions during the fierce hostilities on D-Day, Lieutenant Colonel Jordan immediately assumed command of the scattered Battalion and, promptly reorganizing the men for maximum efficiency, led them in relentless, determined attacks against a fanatic enemy for a grueling two-day period, returning to his station only after the remnants of the unit were attached to another command ashore. By his forceful and determined leadership, his valiant fighting spirit and dauntless courage in the face of extreme peril, Lieutenant Colonel Jordan contributed materially to the initial establishment of the beachhead sector and to the subsequent success of our forces in occupying the vital hostile stronghold. His zealous devotion to duty throughout reflects the highest credit upon the United States Naval Service.

== Death ==
Jordan died at his residence in Virginia Beach, Virginia, of a coronary occlusion on October 16, 1947. At the time of his death, he was serving as assistant chief of staff of the intelligence section of the Fleet Marine Force, Atlantic Fleet. Jordan is interred at Arlington National Cemetery, in section 8, site 6462.
