= Franklin A. Hart =

United States Marine Corps general

Franklin Augustus Hart
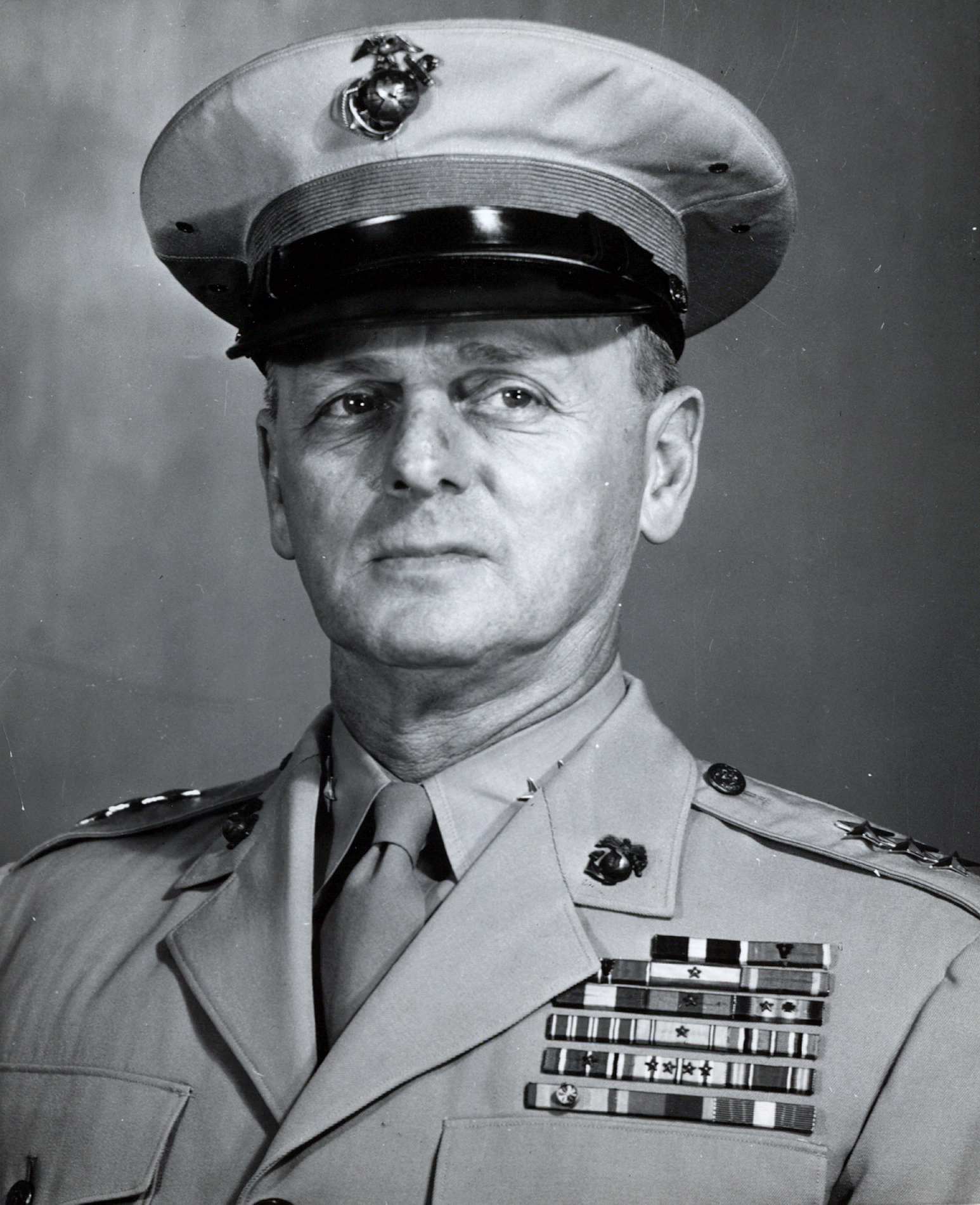
- Franklin P. Hart, USMC
- Born: September 16, 1894; Cuthbert, Georgia, US
- Died: June 22, 1967 (aged 72); Bethesda, Maryland, US
- Burial place: Arlington National Cemetery
- Military career
- Allegiance: United States of America
- Branch: United States Marine Corps
- Service years: 1917–1954
- Rank: General
- Commands: 1st Battalion 8th Marines; 24th Marine Regiment; Marine Corps Recruit Depot Parris Island; 2nd Marine Division; FMF Pacific
- Conflicts: World War I; Banana Wars; Occupation of the Dominican Republic; Occupation of Nicaragua; Occupation of Haiti; World War II; Battle of Kwajalein; Battle of Saipan; Battle of Tinian; Battle of Iwo Jima
- Awards: Navy Cross; Legion of Merit; Bronze Star

Franklin Augustus Hart (September 16, 1894 – June 22, 1967) was a four-star general in the United States Marine Corps who served more than thirty-seven years. His varied and colorful career included service during the two World Wars, sea duty aboard several ships of the Navy, and tours in Haiti, Nicaragua, and the Dominican Republic.

During World War II, General Hart was awarded the Navy Cross while commanding the 24th Marines in the assault and capture of Roi-Namur Island, Kwajalein Atoll, and was awarded the Legion of Merit while leading the regiment in the battles for Saipan and Tinian in the Marianas Islands. As assistant division commander, Fourth Marine Division, during the assault at Iwo Jima, he was awarded the Bronze Star.

His citation for the Navy Cross reads in part, "Landing when the assault troops had advanced only one hundred yards from the beach, Colonel Hart fearlessly led his combat team against heavy enemy resistance in a crushing attack toward its first objective."

"After repelling numerous counter attacks during the night, he skillfully reorganized his depleted units and affected a coordinated assault the next morning, rapidly overcoming all remaining opposition, and exterminating a large force of determined and fanatical Japanese."

"By his valiant performance of duty and outstanding leadership throughout this perilous assignment, Colonel Hart inspired all with whom he served."

== Biography ==
Franklin A. Hart was born on 16 September 1894 in Cuthbert, Georgia, and is a native resident of Eufaula, Alabama. He attended Alabama Polytechnic Institute (now Auburn University), graduating in the class of 1915. He participated in sports at Auburn — he was a member of the varsity football team, varsity track team, and varsity soccer team from 1911 to 1914.

On April 6, 1917, he was appointed a second lieutenant in the United States Marine Corps, and four months later was appointed to the rank of first lieutenant. After completing a course of instruction at the Marine Officers School, Norfolk, Virginia, he was ordered to sea duty as commanding officer of the Marine detachment aboard the USS Vermont. He was promoted to the rank of captain in October 1917.

=== World War I ===
In September 1918, Hart was transferred from sea duty, and in October 1918, he sailed for France as commanding officer, Company "B", Machine Gun Battalion, Fifth Brigade. He returned to the United States in July 1919, and was assigned to the Marine Barracks, Quantico, Virginia.

=== Between World Wars ===
Two months later, he was again ordered to foreign shore duty, this time to the Dominican Republic, where he was assigned duty with the Guardia Nacional Dominicans, as district commander of Santo Domingo (then Ciudad Trujillo). He returned to the United States in 1921, and in December of that year was assigned as commanding officer, 77th Machine Gun Company, 2nd Battalion, 5th Marines, at Marine Barracks, Quantico, Virginia. In October 1922, he was transferred to the Marine Barracks, Washington, D.C., where he served as adjutant and other related duties.

In October 1923, he was assigned to the Army Infantry School, Fort Benning, Georgia, as a student. Graduating in May of the following year, he was ordered to the Marine Barracks, Philadelphia, where he became an instructor at the Marine Corps Basic School.

His second tour of sea duty came in June 1926, when he took command of the Marine detachment aboard the USS Washington (ACR-11). In January 1927, he assumed command of the detachment aboard the USS Rochester (CA-1), and the following month, was assigned similar duties aboard the USS Milwaukee (CL-5). The detachment served ashore with a landing force in Nicaragua for the next five months.

From June 1927, until July of the following year, Hart again commanded the Marine detachment aboard the USS Rochester. During the latter six months of this tour, he again served ashore in Nicaragua until August 1928, when he returned to the United States.

From 1928 to 1930, Hart was stationed successively at the Marine Barracks, Norfolk, as executive officer, and the Marine Barracks, Quantico. At the latter post, he served as an instructor at the Company Officers Course, Marine Corps Schools.

He returned to foreign shore duty in August 1930, and joined the Constabulary Detachment, Garde d'Haiti, Gonsaieves, Haiti, where he served as a company commander and district commander. In May 1933, he was named assistant chief of staff, Garde d'Haiti, Headquarters, Port-au-Prince, Haiti.

Returning to the United States in July 1934, he was assigned to the Senior Course, Marine Corps Schools, Quantico, as a student. He was promoted to the rank of major as of 29 May 1934, and successfully completed the Senior Course in May 1935.

In June 1935, he reported to duty at Headquarters Marine Corps, Washington, D.C., where he performed duties in the War Plans Section, Division of Operations and Training. He was appointed a lieutenant colonel, in July 1936, and in October 1937, he became officer in charge, War Plans Section.

Hart's next assignment was to the Army War College, Washington, D.C. Graduating in June 1939, he was ordered to the Marine Corps Base, San Diego, California, where he became chief of the planning section. In July 1940, he was named commanding officer, 1st Battalion 8th Marines, 2nd Marine Division.

=== World War II ===
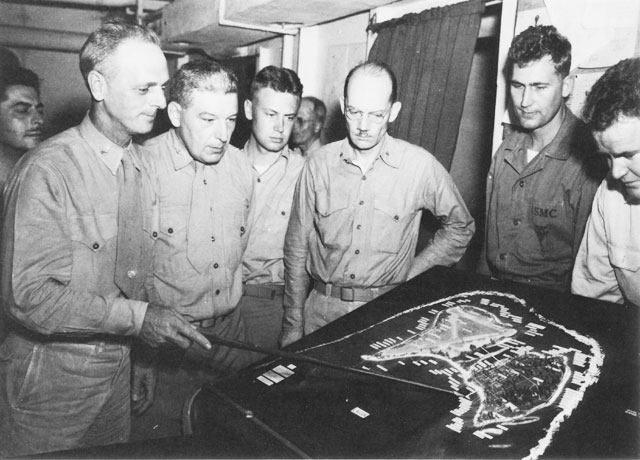
Col Franklin A. Hart (left), commander of the 24th Marines, briefs his staff on the operation plan for the invasion of Roi-Namur.

He went to England in June 1941, where he was attached to the American Embassy in London as Assistant Naval Attaché. In September of the same year, he assumed duties as Special Naval Observer and additional duty on the staff of the Chief, Combined Operations (British) as an instructor in amphibious warfare, and was appointed to the rank of colonel in December 1941. In July 1942, Hart participated in the Dieppe Operation, for which he was specially commended for outstanding conduct by Lord Louis Mountbatten, Chief of Combined Operations. He remained in England until October 1942, when he returned to the United States to become a member of the Staff of the Commander-in-chief, U.S. Fleet, Navy Department, Washington, D.C., as Chief, Future Plans Section.

In June 1943, Colonel Hart was ordered to the 4th Marine Division where he assumed command of the 24th Marine Regiment. During the following year he led the regiment in the attack on Roi-Namur, Kwajalein Atoll, Marshall Islands, where he was awarded the Navy Cross, and the assault on Saipan and Tinian and the Marianas Islands, where he was awarded the Legion of Merit.

Appointed a brigadier general in August 1944, he served as assistant division commander of the 4th Marine Division, until late 1945, and in this capacity participated in the Battle of Iwo Jima, where he was awarded the Bronze Star.

=== Final posts ===
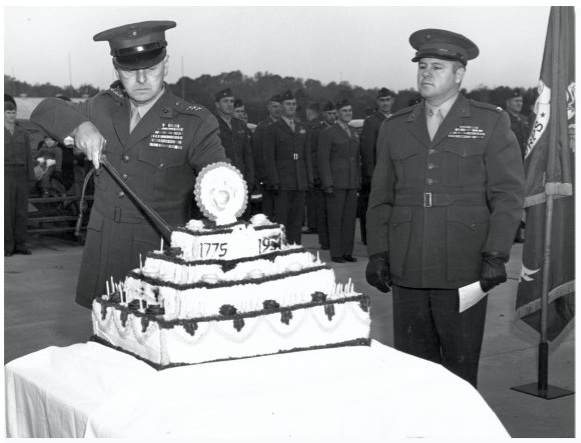
LtGen Franklin A. Hart cuts the first piece of cake at the 1951 Marine Corps Birthday Celebration, TBS, Quantico while Col David M. Shoup looks on.

He returned to the United States in September 1945, and assumed duties as director, Division of Reserve, Headquarters, Marine Corps, Washington, D.C. In January 1946, he became director, Division of Public Information and in July, director of personnel.

In October 1946, he went to the Marine Corps Recruit Depot Parris Island, South Carolina, as commanding general of the Post. Appointed a major general in December 1946, the general remained at that post until assigned duties as commanding general of the Second Marine Division, with additional duties as commanding general, Marine Barracks, Camp Lejeune, North Carolina on 31 January 1948.

He was named commandant of the Marine Corps Schools at Quantico, Virginia, in July 1950, and was promoted to the rank of lieutenant general in February of the following year. He became commanding general, Fleet Marine Force, Pacific, in January 1952.

He retired in August 1954 after 37 years of Marine Corps service and was advanced to the rank of general.

General Franklin Hart died on June 22, 1967, at the U.S. Naval Hospital, Bethesda, Maryland, and was buried in Arlington National Cemetery.

== Awards and decorations ==
Hart's awards include:

| Navy Cross | Legion of Merit w/ Combat V | | Bronze Star w/ Combat V |
| Navy Presidential Unit Citation w/ 1 service star | Navy Unit Commendation | Marine Corps Expeditionary Medal w/ 2 service stars | Mexican Border Service Medal |
| World War I Victory Medal w/ Atlantic Fleet clasp & Maltese cross | Nicaraguan Campaign Medal (1933) | American Defense Service Medal | American Campaign Medal |
| European-African-Middle Eastern Campaign Medal w/ 1 service star | Asiatic-Pacific Campaign Medal w/ 4 service stars | World War II Victory Medal | Navy Occupation Service Medal |
| National Defense Service Medal | Haitian Diploma for the National Order of Honour and Merit, Officer | Haitian Distinguished Service Medal with Diploma | Haitian Brevet of Merit with Diploma |

== Notes ==
Military offices
| Preceded by Lemuel C. Shepherd Jr. | Commanding General of the Fleet Marine Force, Pacific; 1952–1954 | Succeeded by Robert H. Pepper |
| Preceded by | Commandant of the Marine Corps Schools, Quantico; 1950–1952 | Succeeded by |
| Preceded by Thomas E. Watson | Commanding General of the 2nd Marine Division; 1948–1950 | Succeeded by Ray A. Robinson |
| Preceded by Clark W. Thompson | Director of the Division of Reserve; 1945–1946 | Succeeded by Randolph M. Pate |
