= Otto Lessing (general) =

United States Marine Corps general (1904–2002)

Otto Lessing (May 18, 1904 — March 13, 2002) was a major general in the United States Marine Corps.

== Biography ==
Lessing was born on May 18, 1904, in Munich, Germany to a German-Jewish family. Later, he graduated from the University of Wisconsin-Madison. His home of record was Urbana, Illinois where his father, Otto Eduard Lessing, worked as professor of German literature (at University of Illinois) beginning in 1907.

== Career ==
Lessing joined the Marine Corps in 1924. During World War II, he was awarded the Bronze Star Medal with Combat Valor device for his actions as a battalion commander during the Battle of Saipan. He retired from the USMC in 1964 and died on March 13, 2002, at the age of 97.
