= Battle of Saipan order of battle =

WW II battle involving Japan and the United States

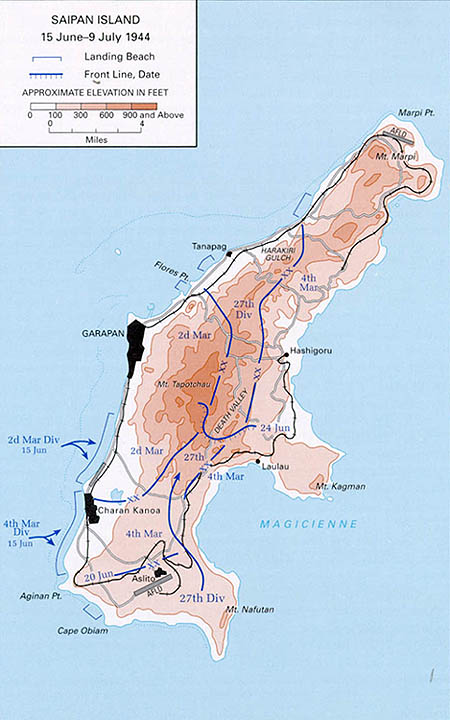

On 15 June 1944, United States Marine forces landed on the southwest coast of the island of Saipan in the central Marianas chain; these were followed a day later by US Army forces. This invasion was part of Operation Forager, an effort to recapture the entire Marianas chain from the Empire of Japan.

The island had been a Japanese possession since it was captured by the Imperial Japanese Army during World War I. As military conflict with the United States became increasingly likely during the 1930s, Japan expended great effort in fortifying Saipan. In mid-1944, nearly 30,000 troops were based on the island, almost double the estimates of US intelligence.

US forces declared Saipan secure on 9 July 1944.

== United States ==
Naval commanders for Operation Forager

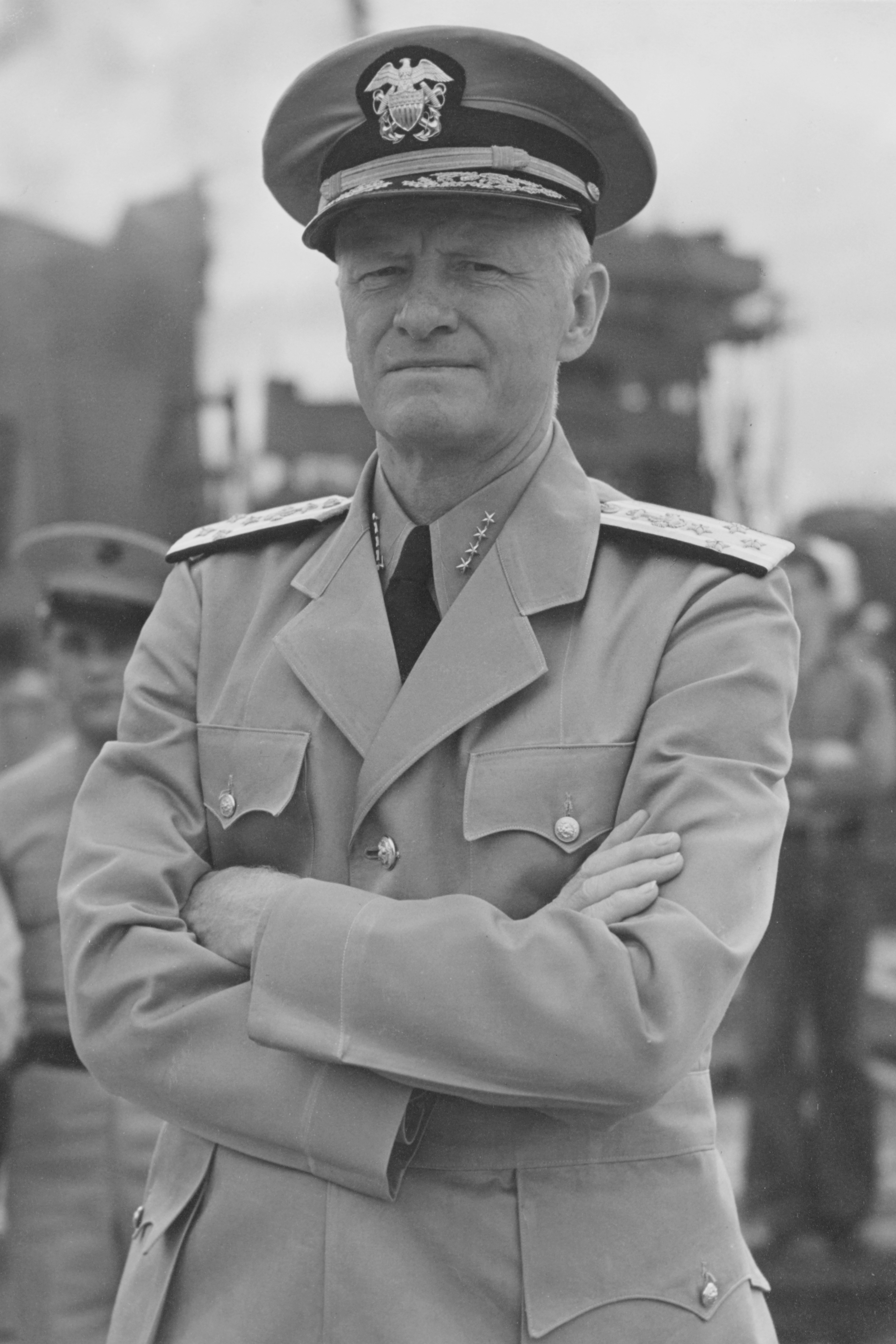
Adm. Chester W. Nimitz

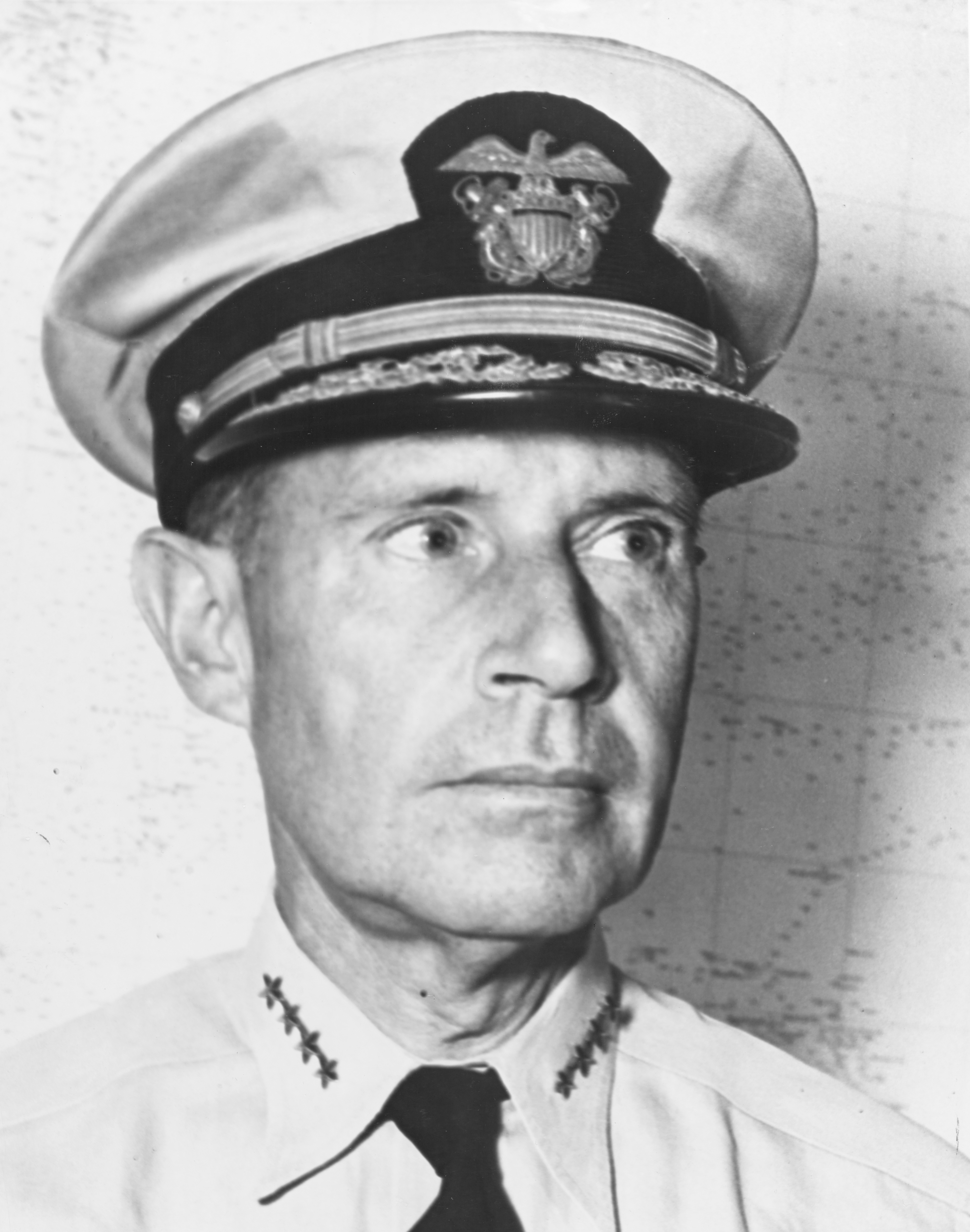
Adm. Raymond A. Spruance

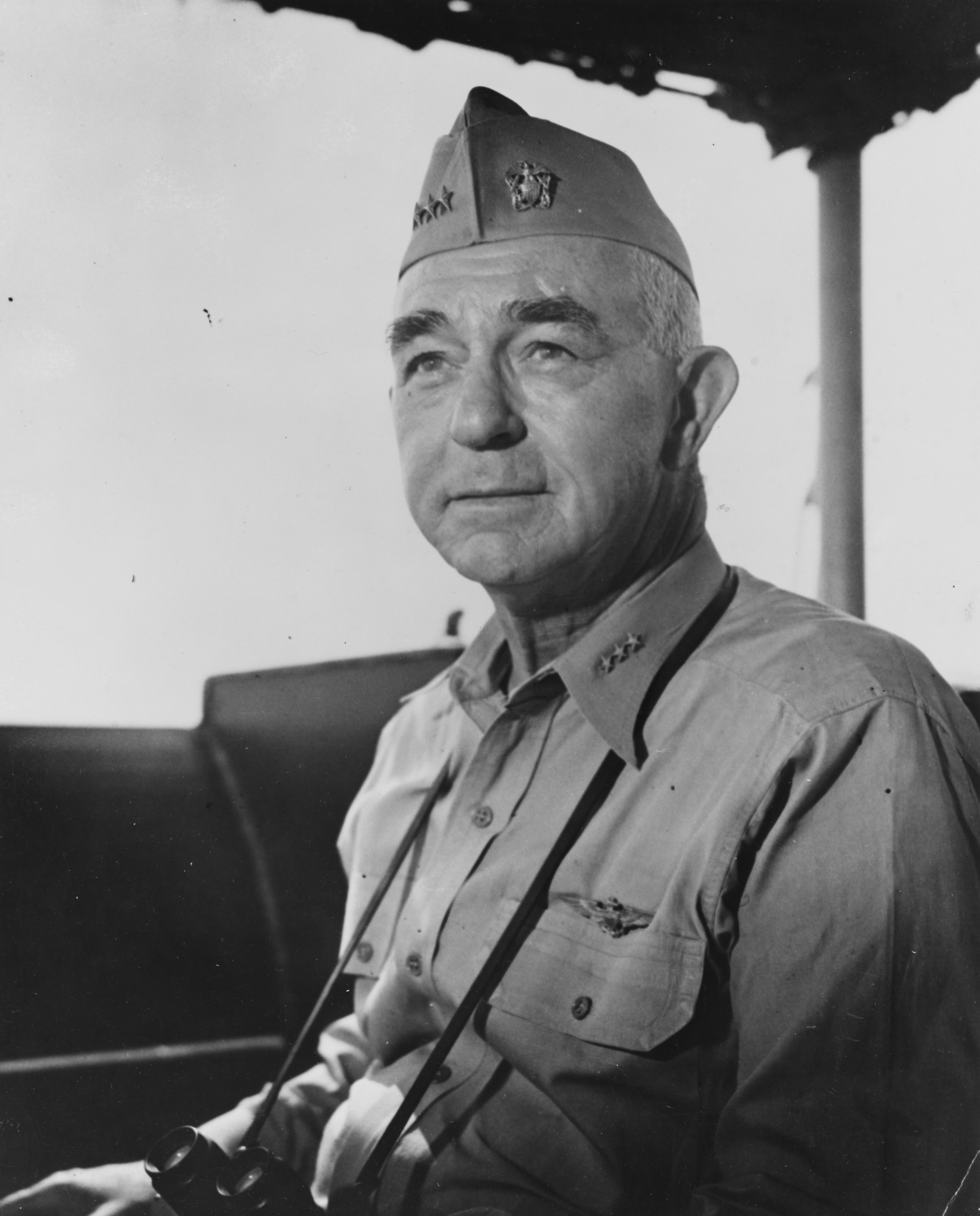
Vice Adm. Richmond Kelly Turner

=== Naval forces ===
United States Pacific Fleet
Admiral Chester W. Nimitz HQ at Pearl Harbor

United States Fifth Fleet
Admiral Raymond A. Spruance in heavy cruiser Indianapolis

Joint Expeditionary Force (Task Force 51)
Vice Admiral Richmond Kelly Turner in amphibious command ship Rocky Mount

Northern Attack Force (Task Force 52 – Saipan and Tinian)
Vice Admiral Turner

Southern Attack Force (Task Force 53 – Guam)
Vice Admiral Richard L. Conolly in amphibious command ship Appalachian

=== Ground forces ===
Ground force commanders on Saipan

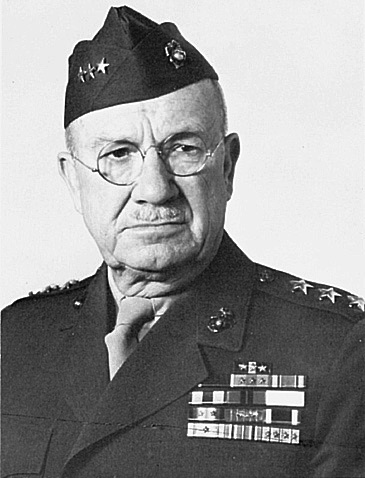
Lieut. Gen. Holland M. Smith

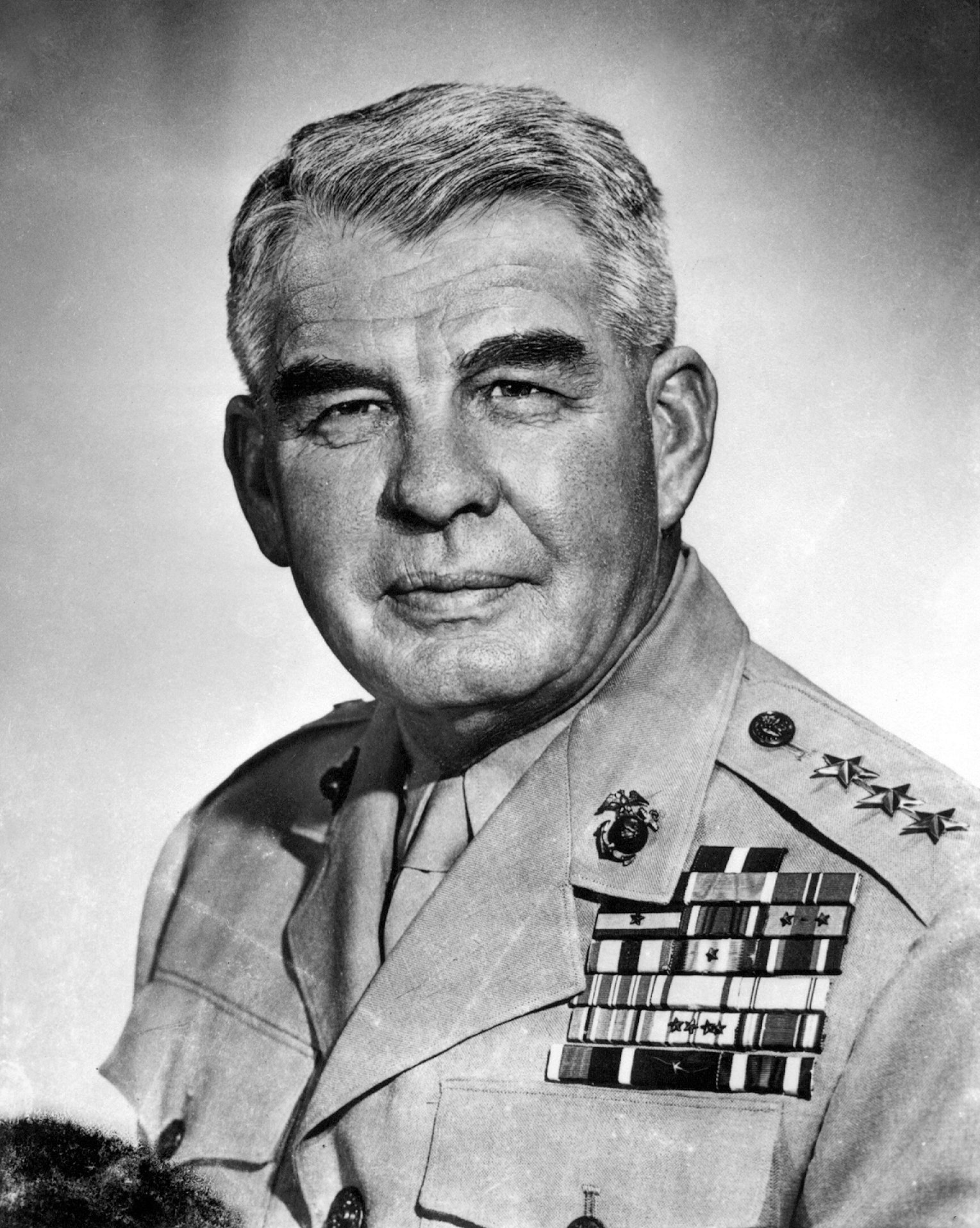
Maj. Gen. Harry Schmidt

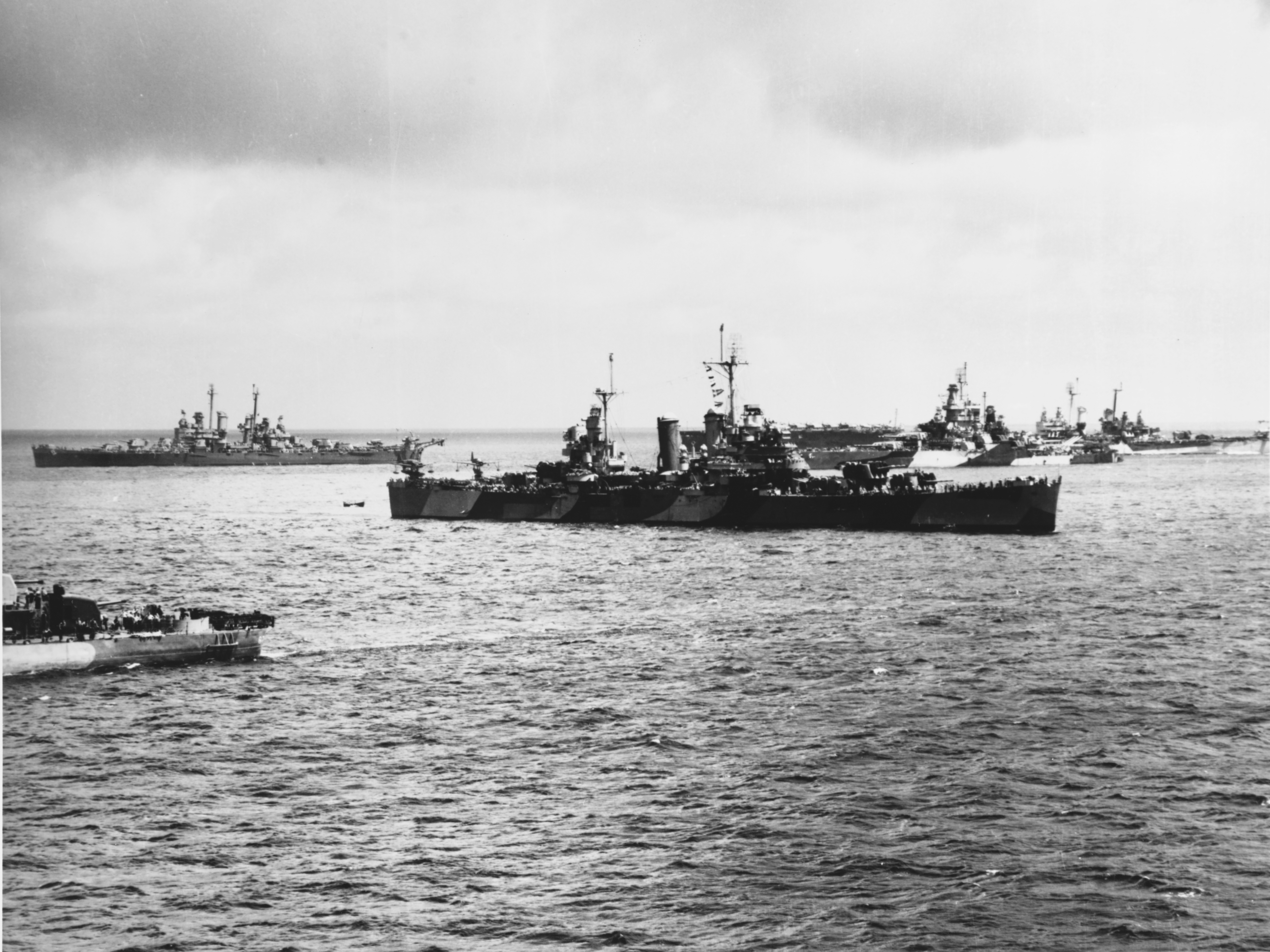
US warships prepare to depart Roi for Saipan.

Expeditionary Troops (Task Force 56)
Lieutenant General Holland M. Smith (Note: Generated so much ill will between the armed services in the Pacific Theater that he had to be relieved of command in July 1945.)

Chief of Staff: Brig. Gen. Graves B. Erskine (Note: Commanded 3rd Marine Division on Iwo Jima.)
Personnel Officer (G-1): Lt. Col. Albert F. Metze
Intelligence Officer (G-2): Col. St. Julien R. Marshall
Operations Officer (G-3): Col. John C. McQueen
Logistics Officer (G-4): Col. Raymond E. Knapp
Plans Officer (G-5): Col. Joseph T. Smith

Northern Troops and Landing Force (Task Group 56.1 – Tinian and Saipan)
Consisting of V Amphibious Corps
Southern Troops and Landing Force (Task Group 56.2 – Guam)
Consisting of III Amphibious Corps

V Amphibious Corps
Lieutenant General Holland M. Smith (Note: Assigned to command of Fleet Marine Force, Pacific, an umbrella command of all Marine Corps forces in the Pacific Theater.)

Chief of Staff: Brig. Gen. Graves B. Erskine
XXIV Corps Artillery (Brig. Gen. Arthur M. Harper)

1st Provisional Gun Group
225th Field Artillery Howitzer Group

2nd Marine Division command on Saipan

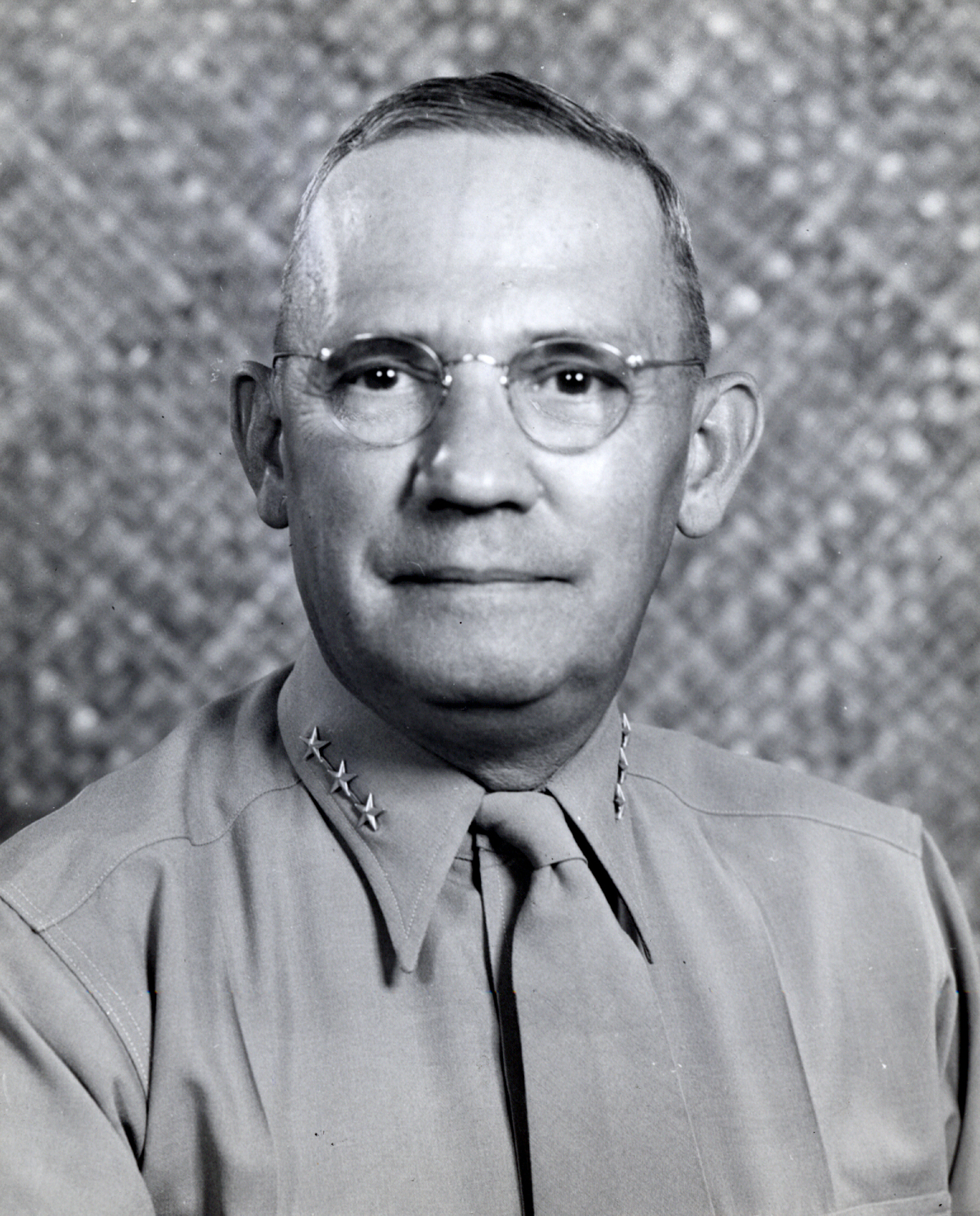
Maj. Gen. Thomas E. Watson

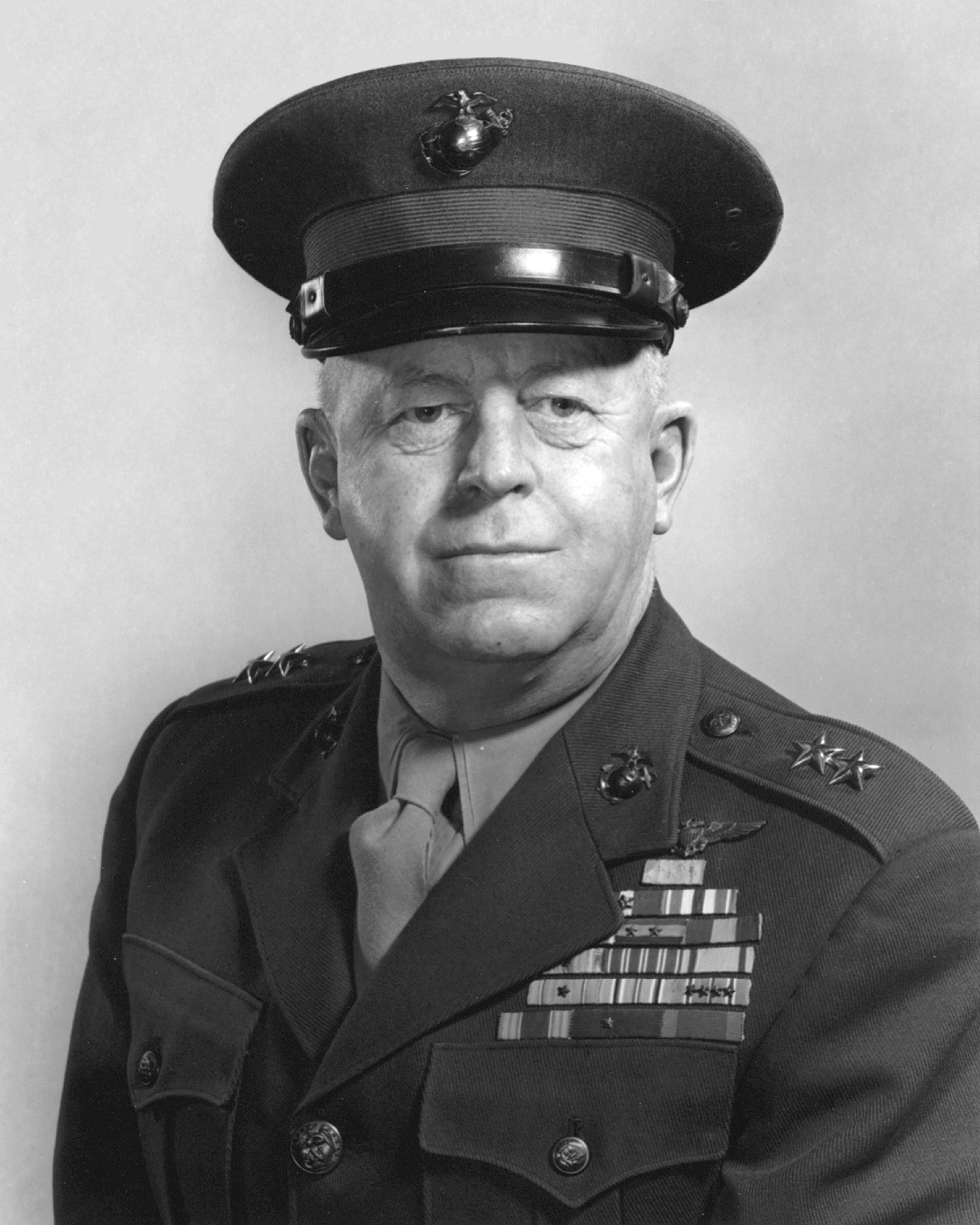
Brig. Gen. Merritt A. Edson

==== Left beaches ====
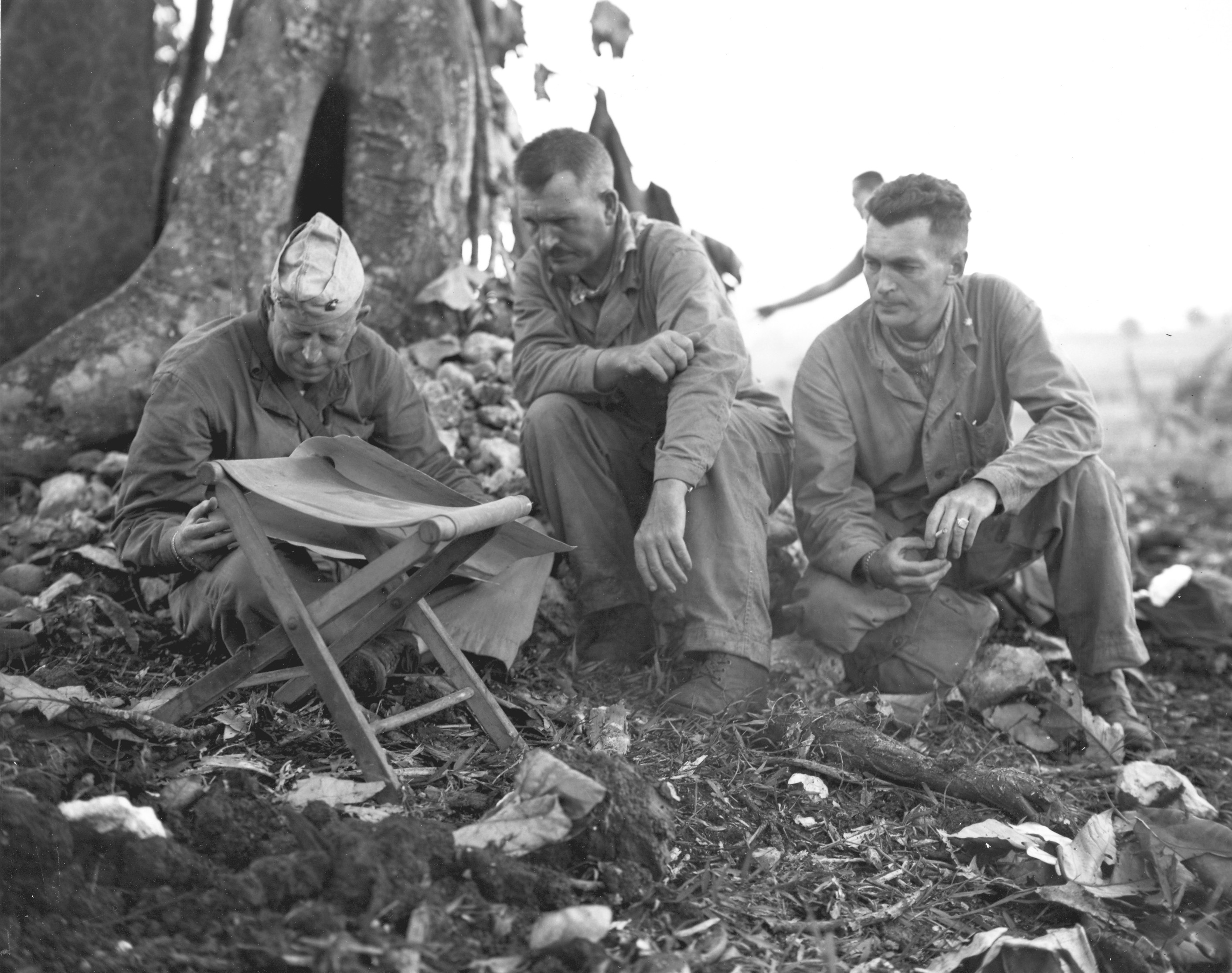
2nd Marine Division asst. cmdr. Merritt A. Edson confers with 8th Marine Regiment officers James P. Riseley and Kenneth F. McLeod on Saipan.

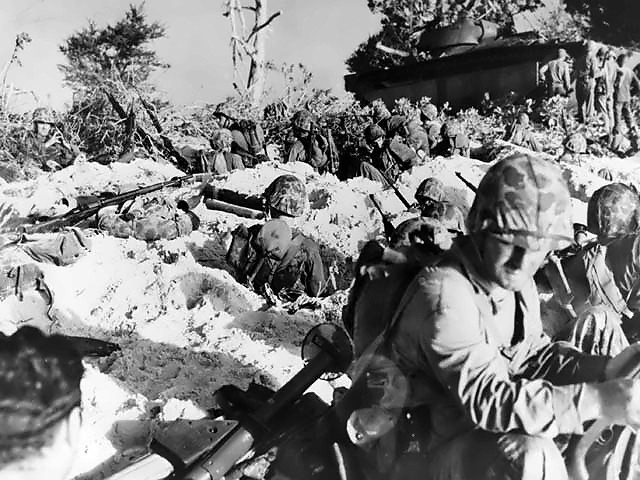
Marines digging in on the beach at Saipan.

2nd Marine Division (21,746 officers and enlisted)

Major General Thomas E. Watson
Asst. Div. Cmdr.: Brig. Gen. Merritt A. Edson
Red beaches

6th Marine Regiment
Commanding Officer: Col. James P. Riseley
Executive Officer: Lt. Col. Kenneth F. McLeod

1st Battalion (Lt. Col. William K. Jones)
2nd Battalion (Lt. Col. Raymond L. Murray)
3rd Battalion (Lt. Col. John W. Easley)

Green beaches

8th Marine Regiment
Commanding Officer: Col. Clarence R. Wallace
Executive Officer: Lt. Col. Jack P. Juhan

1st Battalion (Lt. Col. Lawrence C. Hays Jr.)
2nd Battalion (Lt. Col. Henry P. Crowe)
3rd Battalion (Lt. Col. John C. Miller Jr.)

Floating reserve

2nd Marine Regiment
Commanding Officer: Col. Walter J. Stuart
Executive Officer: Lt. Col. John H. Griebel

1st Battalion (Lt. Col. Wood B. Kyle)
2nd Battalion (Lt. Col. Richard C. Nutting)
3rd Battalion (Lt. Col. Arnold F. Johnston)

Landed after D-Day

10th Marine Regiment (Artillery)
Commanding Officer: Col. Raphael Griffin
Executive Officer: Lt. Col. Ralph E. Forsyth

1st Battalion (Lt. Col. Presley M. Rixey)
2nd Battalion (Lt. Col. George R. E. Shell)
3rd Battalion (Maj. William L. Crouch)
4th Battalion (Lt. Col. Kenneth A. Jorgensen)

18th Marine Regiment (Engineer)
Commanding Officer: Lt. Col. Ewart S. Laue

1st Battalion, 18th Marines (Lt. Col. August L. Vogt)
2nd Battalion, 18th Marines (Lt. Col. Chester J. Salazar)

2nd Tank Battalion (USMC)
Attached units

1st Battalion, 29th Marine Regiment (Lt. Col. Guy E. Tannyhill; Lt. Col. Rathvon M. Tompkins; Lt. Col. Jack P. Juhan)
715th Amphibian Tractor Battalion (Army)

4th Marine Division command on Saipan

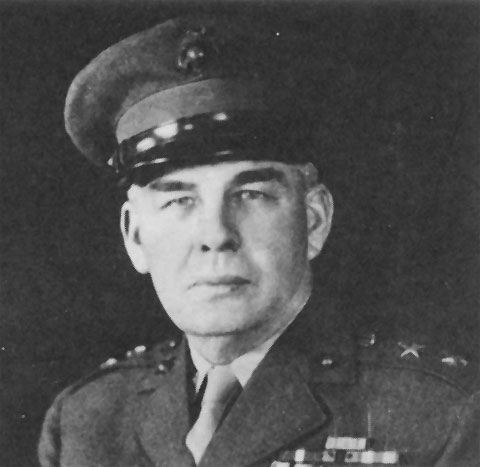
Maj. Gen. Harry Schmidt

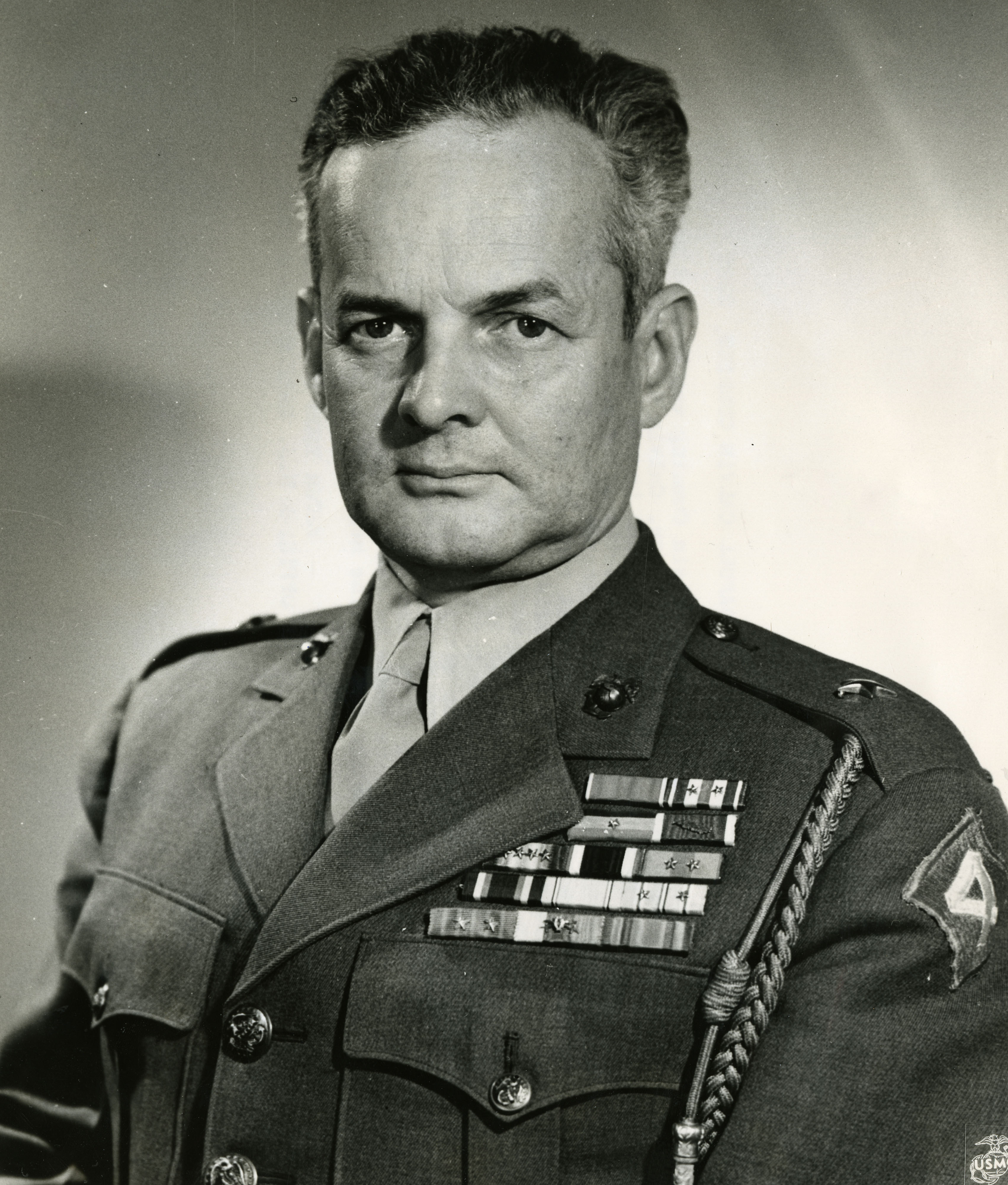
Brig. Gen. Samuel C. Cumming

==== Right beaches ====
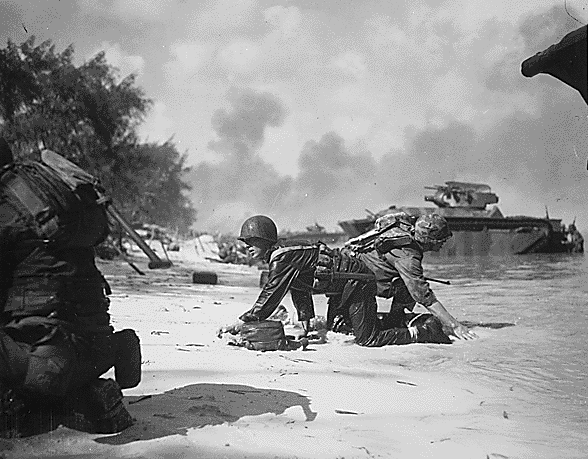
Two Marines crawl to their assigned positions on the beach on Saipan.

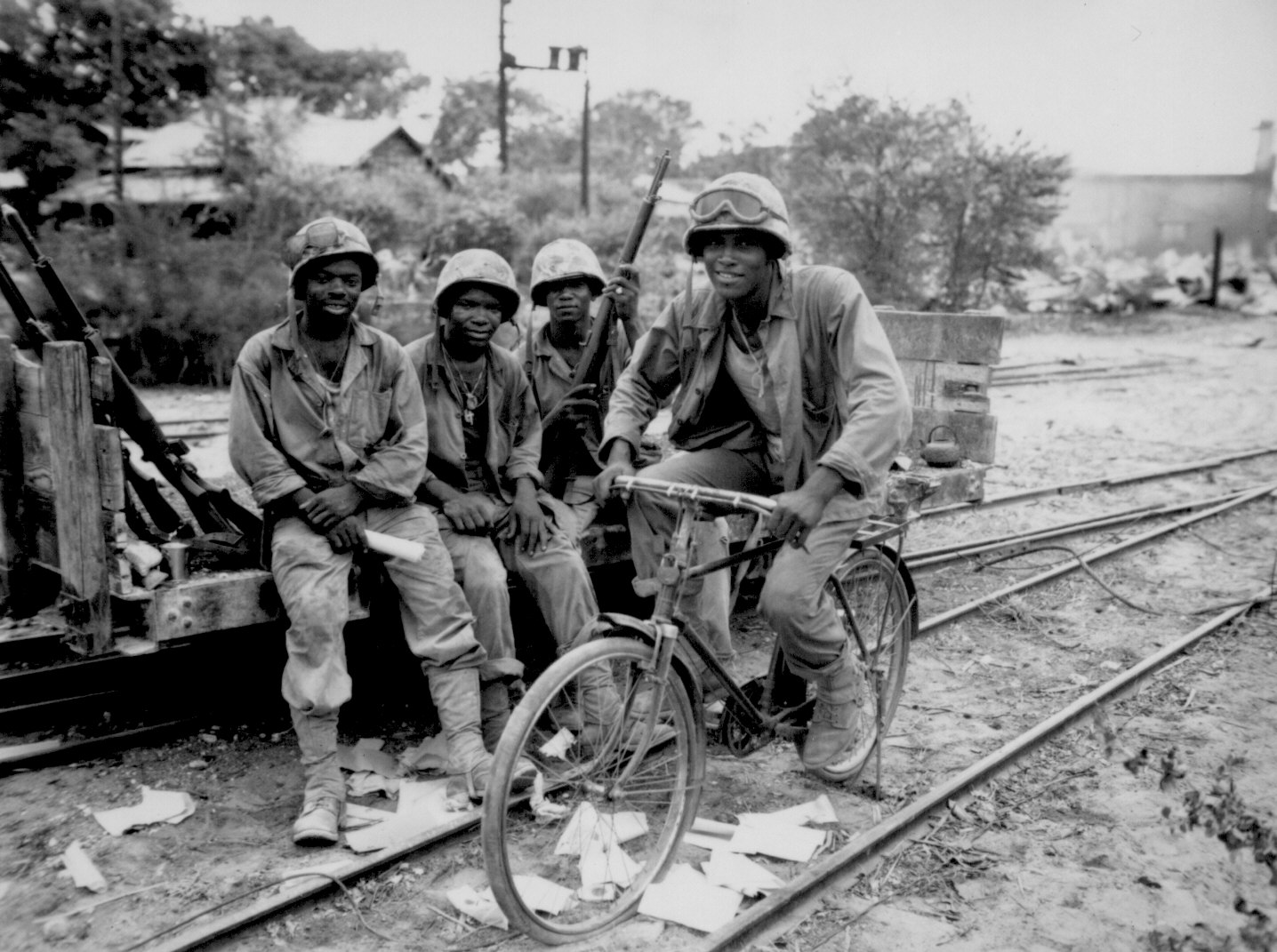
African-American Marine ammunition carriers on Saipan.

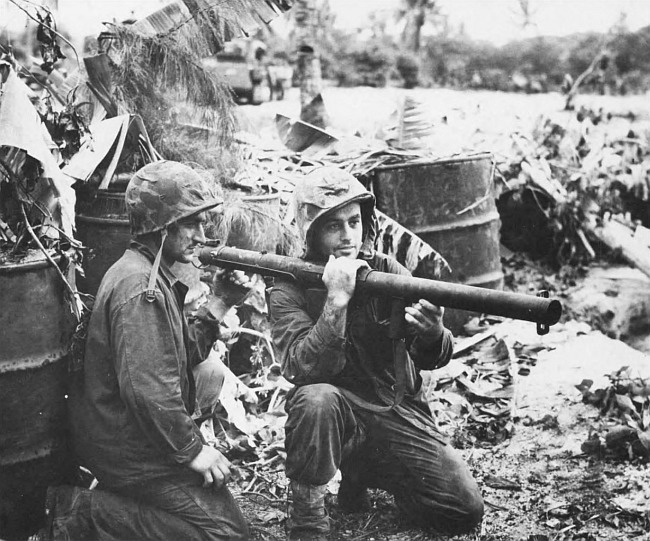
Two Marine PFCs display the bazooka they used to disable Japanese tanks on Saipan.

4th Marine Division (21,618 officers and enlisted)

Major General Harry Schmidt
Asst. Div. Cmdr.: Brig. Gen. Samuel C. Cumming
Blue beaches

23rd Marine Regiment
Colonel Louis R. Jones
Exec. Ofc.: Lt. Col. John R. Lanigan

1st Battalion (Lt. Col. Ralph Haas)
2nd Battalion (Lt. Col. Edward J. Dillon)
3rd Battalion (Maj. John J. Cosgrove)

Yellow beaches

25th Marine Regiment
Colonel Merton J. Batchelder
Exec. Ofc.: Lt. Col. Clarence J. O'Donnell

1st Battalion (Lt. Col. Hollis U. Mustain)
2nd Battalion (Lt. Col. Lewis C. Hudson)
3rd Battalion (Lt. Col. Justice M. Chambers)

Floating reserve

24th Marine Regiment
Colonel Franklin A. Hart
Exec. Ofc.: Lt. Col. Austin R. Brunelli

1st Battalion (Lt. Col. Robert N. Fricke)
2nd Battalion (Lt. Col. Richard Rothwell)
3rd Battalion (Note: Pvt. Lee Marvin, later a prominent Hollywood actor, was wounded while serving in Company I of this unit during the struggle for Mount Tapochau.) (Lt. Col. Otto Lessing)

Landed after D-Day

14th Marine Regiment (Artillery)
Colonel Louis G. DeHaven
Exec. Ofc.: Lt. Col. Randall M. Victory

1st Battalion (Lt. Col. Harry J. Zimmer)
2nd Battalion (Lt. Col. George B. Wilson Jr.)
3rd Battalion (Maj. Robert E. MacFarlane)
4th Battalion (Lt. Col. Carl A. Youngdale)

20th Marine Regiment (Engineer)
Lt. Colonel Nelson K. Brown
Exec. Ofc.: Capt. William M. Anderson

1st Battalion (Maj. Richard G. Ruby)
2nd Battalion (Maj. John H. Partridge)

4th Tank Battalion (USMC)

Attached units

708th Amphibian Tank Battalion (Army)
773rd Amphibian Tractor Battalion (Army)
534th Amphibian Tractor Battalion (Army)

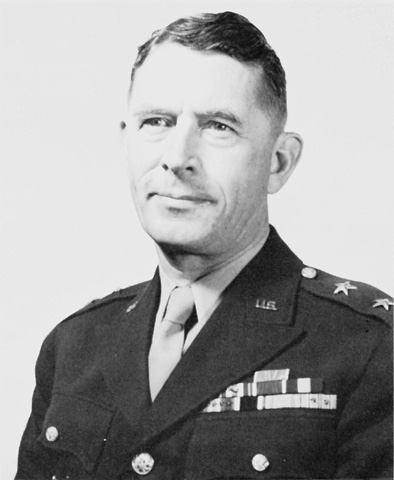
Maj. Gen. Ralph C. Smith

==== Expeditionary Troops reserve (Landed D+1) ====
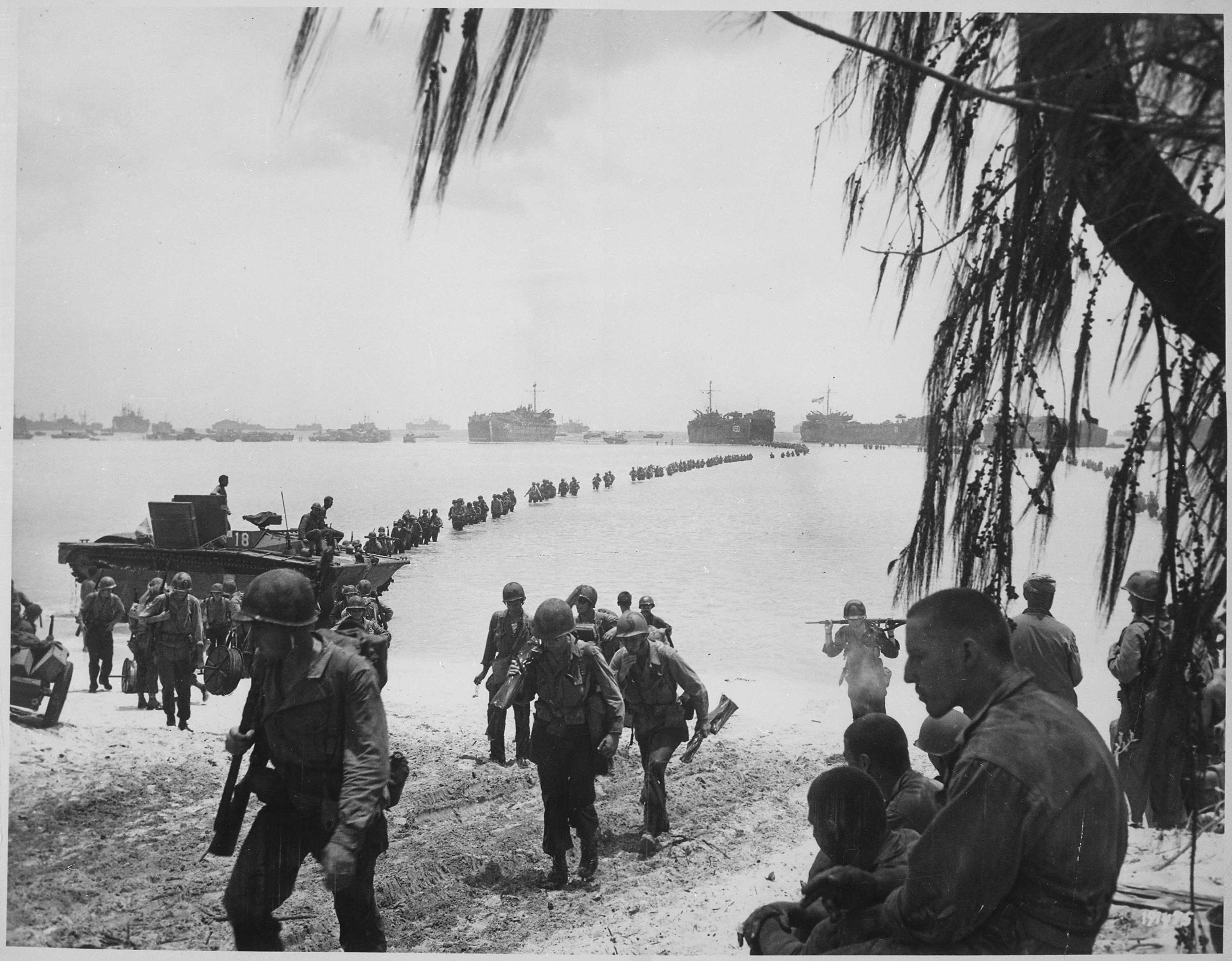
US Army soldiers disembark from LSTs on Saipan.

27th Infantry Division (Army) (16,404 officers and enlisted)

Major General Ralph C. Smith (thru 24 Jun) (Note: Relieved of command and expelled from the island by Lt. Gen. Holland Smith for allowing his troops to fall behind the Marine Corps advance up the island.)
Major General Sanderford Jarman (24 Jun thru 28 Jun)
Major General George W. Griner (after 28 Jun)
Blue beaches

Infantry

105th Infantry Regiment
106th Infantry Regiment
165th Infantry Regiment

Artillery

104th Field Artillery Battalion
105th Field Artillery Battalion
106th Field Artillery Battalion
249th Field Artillery Battalion

Armor

762nd Tank Battalion
766th Tank Battalion

Engineer

102nd Engineer Combat Battalion (Actual organic unit)
502nd Engineer Combat Battalion (No data to confirm existence)

Navy

UDT 5
UDT 6

== Japan ==
Commanders of Imperial forces in the Marianas and on Saipan

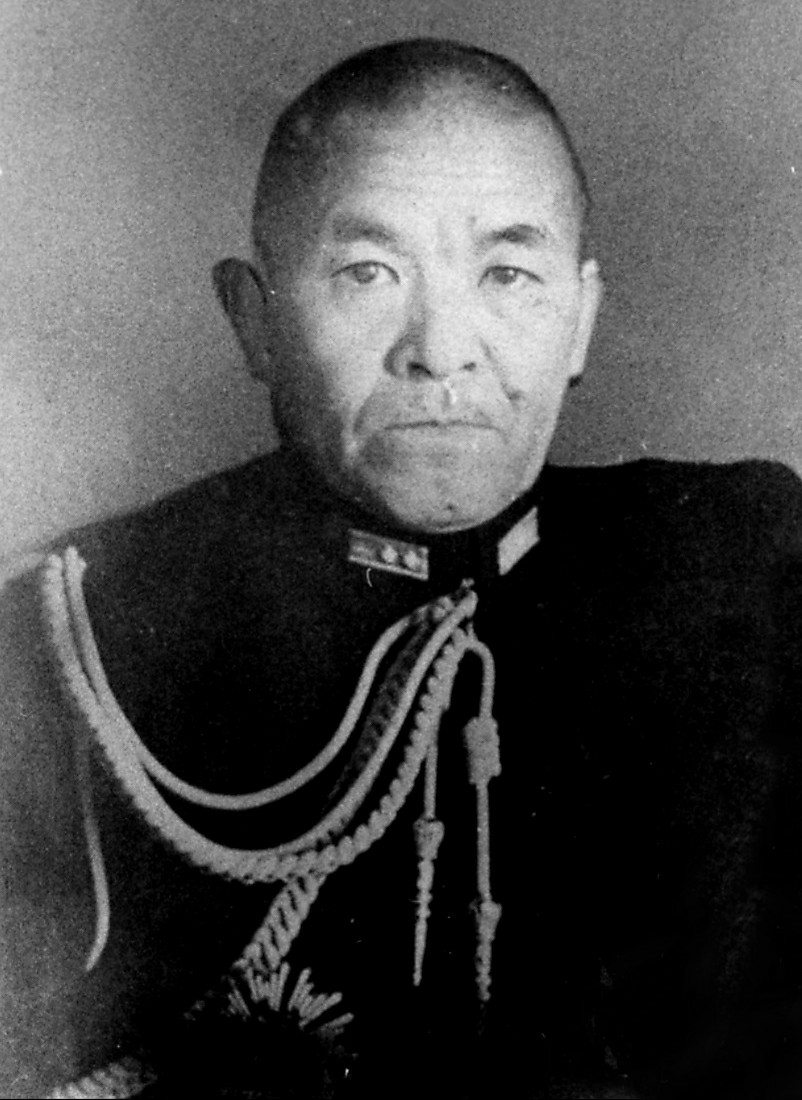
Vice Adm. Chūichi Nagumo

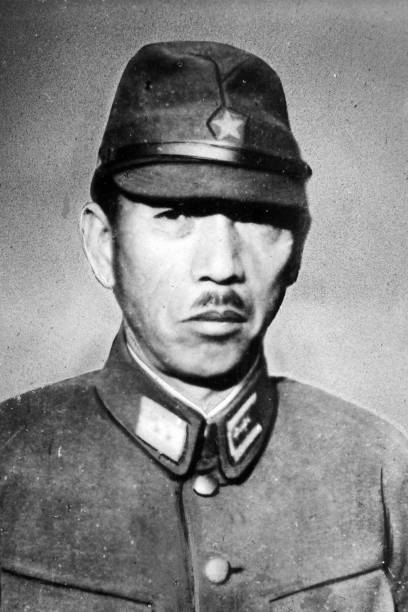
Lt. Gen. Yoshitsugu Saito

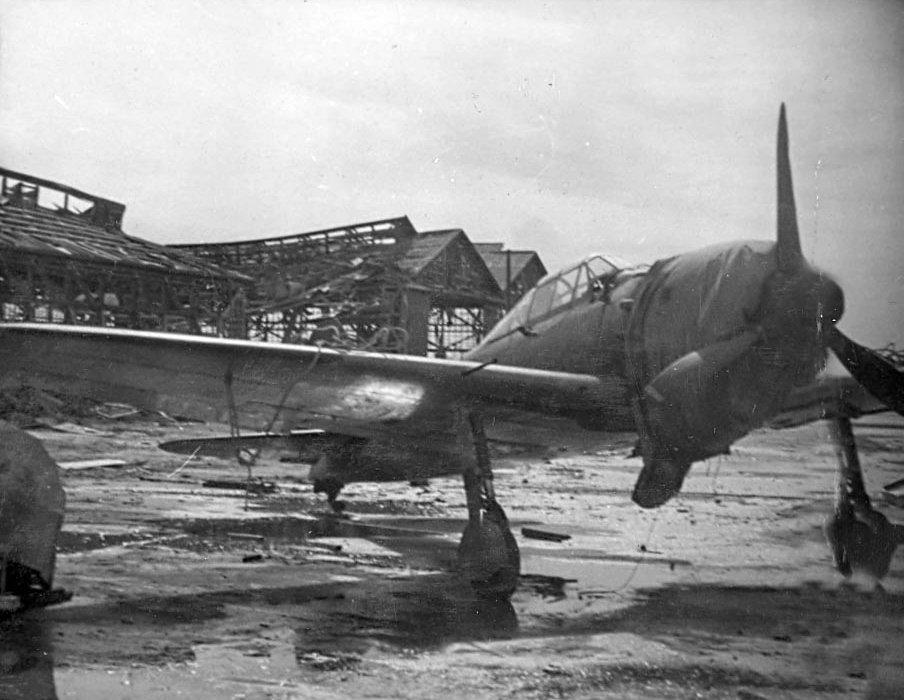
A captured Mitsubishi A6M5 Zero fighter at a Japanese airfield on Saipan.

Central Pacific Area Fleet HQ
Vice Admiral Chūichi Nagumo (self-inflicted gunshot 6 July)
Chief of staff: Rear Adm. Hideo Yano (seppuku 7 July)

Thirty-first Army (Note: A Japanese army was equivalent to a Euro-American corps.)
Lieutenant General Hideyoshi Obata (on inspection tour of Guam during battle; seppuku there 11 August)
14th Air Fleet

Defenses of Saipan
Lieutenant General Yoshitsugu Saito (seppuku 7 July)
Approx. 25,500 army and 6,200 navy personnel

43rd Division

118th Infantry Regiment
135th Infantry Regiment
136th Infantry Regiment

47th Independent Mixed Brigade

315th Independent Infantry Battalion (Present at Tinian during the Battle)
316th Independent Infantry Battalion
317th Independent Infantry Battalion
9th Expeditionary Unit (a straggler unit; part was reorganized as 318th Independent Infantry Battalion)
1st Battalion, 18th Infantry Regiment

Navy Units

1st YOKOSUKA SNLF (1,326 personnel)
5th Base (1,049* personnel)
55th Guard Unit (2,504* personnel)
2 Construction Battalions

Other units

3rd Independent Mountain Artillery Regiment
9th Tank Regiment (of 1st Tank Division)
3rd Battalion, 9th Independent Mixed Regiment
25th Antiaircraft Artillery Regiment
7th Independent Engineer Battalion
14th Independent Mortar Battalion
17th Independent Mortar Battalion
Miscellaneous straggler units

== See also ==
Orders of battle involving United States Marine forces in the Pacific Theatre of World War II:

- Battle of Guadalcanal order of battle
- Battle of Tarawa order of battle
- Guam (1944) order of battle
- Battle of Leyte opposing forces
- Battle of Peleliu opposing forces
- Battle of Iwo Jima order of battle
- Okinawa ground order of battle

== Bibliography ==
- Clark, George B. (2006). The Six Marine Divisions in the Pacific: Every Campaign of World War II. Jefferson, North Carolina: McFarland and Co. ISBN 978-0-7864-2769-7.
- Goldberg, Harold J. (2007). D-Day in the Pacific: The Battle of Saipan. Indiana University Press. ISBN 978-0-25334-869-2.
- Johnston, Richard W. (1987). Follow Me: The Story of the Second Marine Division in World War II. Battery Press. ISBN 0-89839-099-0.
- Morison, Samuel Eliot (1953). New Guinea and the Marianas, March 1944 – August 1944. History of United States Naval Operations in World War II. Vol. VIII. Boston: Little, Brown and Co. LCCN 53-7298.
- Rottman, Gordon; Howard Gerrard (2004). Saipan & Tinian 1944: Piercing the Japanese Empire. Oxford: Osprey Publishing. ISBN 1-84176-804-9.
