= USS Staunch =

Minesweeper of the United States Navy

History

United States
- Name: USS Staunch
- Builder: Associated Shipbuilders
- Laid down: 5 September 1943
- Launched: 15 February 1944
- Commissioned: 9 September 1944
- Decommissioned: April 1946
- Reclassified: MSF-307, 7 February 1955
- Stricken: 1 April 1967
- Fate: Sold for scrap 9 October 1969

General characteristics
- Class & type: Admirable-class minesweeper
- Displacement: 650 tons; 945 tons (full load)
- Length: 184 ft 6 in (56.24 m)
- Beam: 33 ft (10 m)
- Draft: 9 ft 9 in (2.97 m)
- Propulsion: 2 × 1,710 shp Cooper Bessemer GSB-8 diesel engines; National Supply Co. single reduction gear; 2 shafts
- Speed: 14.8 knots (27.4 km/h)
- Complement: 104
- Armament: 1 × 3"/50 caliber gun DP; 1 × twin Bofors 40 mm guns; 6 × Oerlikon 20 mm cannon; 1 × Hedgehog anti-submarine mortar; 4 × Depth charge projectors (K-guns); 2 × Depth charge racks

Service record
- Part of: US Pacific Fleet (1944-1946); Atlantic Reserve Fleet (1946-1967)
- Operations: Battle of Iwo Jima; Battle of Okinawa
- Awards: 4 Battle stars

USS Staunch (AM-307) was a steel-hulled Admirable-class minesweeper built for the U.S. Navy during World War II. Her crew was quickly trained in the art of minesweeping and then sent to the Pacific Ocean to clear dangerous mine fields so that Allied troops could land on Japanese-held beaches. Because of her courageous work under fire, she was awarded four battle stars.

She was laid down, 5 September 1943 by Associated Shipbuilders, Seattle, Washington; launched, 15 February 1944; commissioned USS Staunch (AM-307), 9 September 1944; and, reclassified as a Fleet Minesweeper (Steel Hull), MSF-307, 7 February 1955.

== World War II Pacific Theatre operations ==
Following shakedown training and antisubmarine warfare (ASW) training out of San Pedro and San Diego, California, Staunch was overhauled at Long Beach, California, and then headed for Hawaii at the end of November. She arrived in Pearl Harbor on 10 December 1944, took on supplies and sweep gear, participated in amphibious exercises, and got underway for the Central Pacific on 22 January 1945.

The minesweeper stopped at Eniwetok for fuel and provisions from 3 to 5 February 1945, before continuing on to the Marianas. She conducted ASW patrols for several days and took on fuel and supplies at Tinian; then, on 13 February, sailed with Task Unit (TU) 52.3.18 in the screen of USS Terror. Staunch arrived off Iwo Jima early on 16 February and made a sweep of the shoreline. On the 17th and 18th, she served as an antisubmarine picket and bombarded the shore on the eve of the assault. Staunch spent D-Day assisting in the refueling of the smaller minesweepers. All during her stay at Iwo Jima, she joined other minesweepers in screening Terror during nightly retirements to the transport area.

== Rescue operations ==
After the landings on 19 February 1945, Staunch remained in the Bonins until 7 March 1945. While there she served on several patrol stations and helped rescue sailors who fell overboard during a collision between USS Logan and Napa. She cleared the Bonins on 7 March and reached Ulithi, in the western Carolines, four days later. After eight days of repairs provisioning, and fueling, Staunch exited Ulithi Lagoon on 19 March 1945. She reached the Ryūkyūs on 25 March and immediately streamed her gear to sweep mines around Kerama Retto. Between 26 and 29 March, Staunch and the other minesweepers swept mines from the approaches to the assault beaches on Okinawa fueled the smaller minesweepers, and periodically fought off air attacks. Each night she retired seaward.

== Invasion of Okinawa ==
Duty in the antisubmarine screen occupied her time on the day before the invasion. On 1 April 1945, the assault troops stormed the Hagushi beaches on Okinawa, and Staunch settled into the routine of patrols and ASW screening. Until 31 May 1945, she came under frequent air attacks, though most were directed at the larger ships, particularly the radar pickets. During the night of 16 and 17 May, she picked up a small surface contact on her radar screen and found a large boat pulling a raft. Staunch opened fire on the strange enemy craft, and all but one of the Japanese took to the water. The remaining Japanese soldier blew himself up with a hand grenade.

On 31 May 1945, Staunch joined in a practice sweep in preparation for the occupation of Iheya Shima. At 0000 on the following day, she approached the objective, but the operation was called off, and she retired rapidly. On 2 June, she and her sister minesweepers swept the waters around the island, and the U.S. Marines stormed ashore. Then, after watching a Japanese "Val" splash, the minesweeper cleared the area for Okinawa. From then until 8 July 1945, she concentrated on an offensive sweep off Sakishima Gunto, known as Operation Zebra, putting into Kerama Retto periodically for fuel, provisions, and availability. On two occasions while at the anchorage, she joined the other ships in fighting off an enemy aircraft or two. On the morning of 8 July, she put to sea and shaped a course to the Philippines and entered San Pedro Bay, Leyte four days later. Staunch was overhauled while her crew enjoyed liberty.

== End-of-War operations ==
The minesweeper was still at Leyte in mid-August 1945, when Japan's capitulation was announced. But instead of going home, she got underway on 25 August 1945, for Okinawa, reaching Buckner Bay on 31 August. After several days sweeping mines around Okinawa, she headed for Japan.

Staunch spent the next three months participating in the extensive post-war sweep of the waters around the Japanese home islands. She swept the area around Nagasaki and Sasebo until 17 September 1945, then after two days of availability at Sasebo, she sailed off to sweep the area of the Bungo Suido until the 29t September 1945. Between 1 and 21 October 1945, she continued sweeping mines in between typhoons. She returned to the Bungo Suido on 30 October 1945. In November 1945, Staunch joined the major sweep conducted in the Tsushima Strait. That operation continued into December with Staunch putting into Sasebo periodically for availability. At the completion of that operation, she put into Sasebo for fuel and provisions; then got underway on 11 December 1945, for the United States, via Eniwetok and Pearl Harbor.

== Return to Stateside ==
Staunch reached San Diego on 12 January 1946, and remained there for a month. On 11 February 1946, she headed for the Panama Canal and transited it on the night of 21 and 22 February. She made Galveston, Texas, on 28 February and stayed there until 11 April 1946, when she moved to Orange, Texas.

== Post-War deactivation ==
There she joined the Atlantic Reserve Fleet. On 7 February 1955, she was redesignated MSF-307. She remained there until 1 April 1967, when her name was struck from the Navy List. Her hulk was sold on 9 October 1969 to Luria Bros. Co., Inc., for scrapping.

== Awards ==
Staunch earned four battle stars during World War II.
