= Operation Zebra =

Mine clearance operation

Operation Zebra was a July 1945 major mine clearance operation by U.S. Navy minesweepers off Sakishima Gunto, in association with the invasion of Okinawa by Allied Forces in World War II.

== See also ==
- USS Staunch (AM-307)
- Minesweeper
