= Samuel C. Cumming =

United States Marine Corps general

Samuel Calvin Cumming
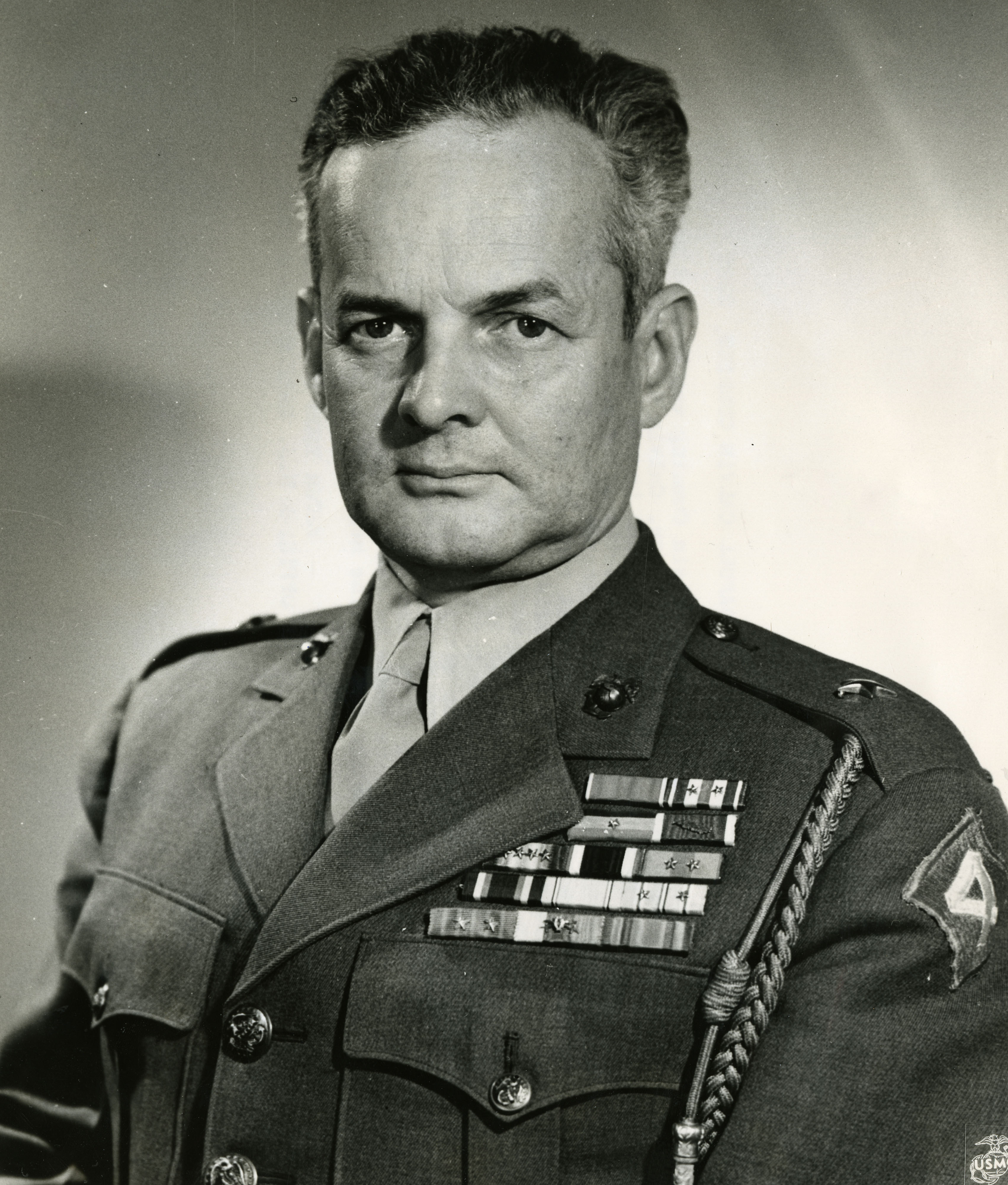
- Brigadier General Cumming in a wartime photo
- Born: October 14, 1895; Kobe, Empire of Japan
- Died: January 14, 1983 (aged 87); Sarasota, Florida, US
- Relatives: Hugh S. Cumming (Uncle); Hugh S. Cumming, Jr. (Cousin)
- Military career
- Allegiance: United States
- Branch: United States Marine Corps
- Service years: 1917–1946
- Rank: Major general
- Nickname: "Calvin"
- Service number: 0-209
- Commands: CoS of MCB Quantico; ADC of 4th Marine Division; 25th Marine Regiment
- Conflicts: World War I: Battle of Belleau Wood; Battle of Saint-Mihiel; Battle of Blanc Mont Ridge; Meuse-Argonne Offensive; Rhineland occupation Haitian Campaign; Yangtze Patrol; World War II: Battle of Kwajalein; Battle of Saipan; Battle of Tinian
- Awards: Silver Star (3); Legion of Merit; Bronze Star Medal; Purple Heart (2)

Samuel Calvin Cumming (October 14, 1895 – January 14, 1983) was a highly decorated officer of the United States Marine Corps with the rank of major general. He is most noted for his service as assistant division commander of the 4th Marine Division during Mariana Islands Campaign and previously as commanding officer of 25th Marine Regiment during Battle of Kwajalein. He was a nephew of Hugh S. Cumming, former Surgeon General of the United States.

== World War I ==
Samuel Calvin Cumming was born on October 14, 1895, in Kobe, Japan. He spent his first eleven years of age in Japan, where his father served as Presbyterian missionary at church in Toyohashi.

His family later moved back to the United States in 1906 and settled in Virginia. Cumming attended the Virginia Military Institute in Lexington, Virginia, where he earned his Bachelor of Science degree in civil engineering in April 1917. He was in the same class as later the 20th commandant of the Marine Corps, Lemuel C. Shepherd. He was commissioned a second lieutenant in the Marine Corps on April 7, 1917.

Cumming was subsequently attached as platoon leader to the 51st Company, 2nd Battalion, 5th Marine Regiment at Philadelphia Navy Yard and sailed for France. His regiment arrived on June 28, 1917, at Saint-Nazaire and subsequently moved to the vicinity of Gondecourt. The 5th Marines underwent training focused on trench warfare, including trench construction, bayonet fighting, grenade throwing, gas mask drill and weapons firing at land targets and airplanes. The training was conducted by elite French Chasseurs Alpins, which were attached to the training as an instructor. Cumming showed great leadership skills and was promoted to the rank of first lieutenant on August 11, 1917.

In October of that year, 5th Marines were attached to the 4th Marine Brigade under Brigadier General Charles A. Doyen and sent within 2nd Army Infantry Division to take part in joint maneuvers with French troops near Bourmont. Cumming was appointed Adjutant of 2nd Battalion under Major Frederick M. Wise in January 1918 and his regiment moved to the trenches in Toulon sector, just southeast of Verdun in mid-March 1918. The service in the trenches were almost calm for 5th Marines, and apart from several smaller German raids, they spent their time digging new trenches and dugouts and repairing the old ones.

First Lieutenant Cumming was appointed again a platoon leader in 51st Company on June 1, 1918, and subsequently led his unit to the Battle of Belleau Wood. During the fighting near the town of Château-Thierry, he led his platoon to the attack and was hit by enemy machine gun fire to his right leg on June 11. His whole platoon was wiped out except himself and another soldier. Cumming later described his engagement as follows:

"Line after line moved off toward a wood six hundred meters away, across an open and level field covered with grass six inches high. The ground became covered with a sheet of machine gun bullets from a Prussian Guard machine gun battalion and their supporting infantry... We moved forward at a slow pace, keeping perfect lines. Men were mowed down like a wheat. A shell hit on my right, and an automatic rifle team, which was there a moment ago disappeared, while men on the right and left were armless, legless, or tearing at their faces."

Upon basic treatment at a first aid station, Cumming was taken to the U.S. Army Hospital No. 1 at Vichy for surgery. His recovery took seven weeks and he rejoined the 5th Marine as a regimental intelligence officer on August 1, 1918. For his previous gallantry in action in Belleau Wood, he was decorated with the Silver Star citation and Croix de guerre 1914–1918 with Gilt Star by the Government of France.

Following his promotion to the rank of captain at the beginning of September 1918, Cumming was appointed commanding officer of his old 51st Company and led his unit during the subsequent Battle of Saint-Mihiel. The 5th Marines moved to the trenches east of the town of Fleury and took part in the patrolling and push of the lines towards the Germans.

During the Battle of Blanc Mont Ridge in October 1918, Cumming led his company to the attack under heavy artillery bombardment and machine gun fire. He did not hesitate to expose himself to enemy fire several times in order to strengthen the morale of his troops. Although he was wounded again by enemy machine gun fire, he supervised his troops until they consolidated their positions. For this act of valor, Cumming received his second Silver Star.

His wound was not so serious at this time and Cumming was able to return to his unit after two weeks. During the last days of War, he led his company during the combats near the town of Beaumont on November 4. Loyal but also fanatical German troops encircled his unit and Cumming resisted until the Armistice of 11 November 1918. His repeated acts of bravery were awarded with his third Silver Star. He also received the Order of the Star of Romania and another French Croix de guerre 1914–1918. He was also authorized to wear Fourragère.

== Interwar period ==
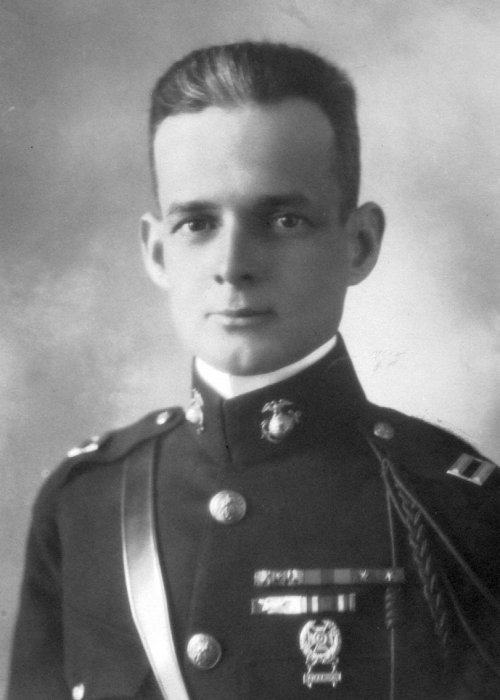
Captain Cumming, USMC, 1920s

Although the war was over, Cumming's regiment was tasked with new duties in Germany. He and his unit crossed the Rhine River on December 13, 1918, near Remagen and moved to the Wied River Valley, which was designated as regimental area of operations. The 5th Marines spent their time with regular training, range firing, and reviews, but also with educational programs.

During June 1919, the German government refused to accept the Allied surrender terms at the Paris Peace Conference. In order to prevent an uprising in Germany, 5th Marine Regiment marched eastwards. After Germany agreed to the terms, they halted their advance in the town of Hartenfels on June 23, 1919. One month later, Cumming and his regiment were ordered back to the United States, arriving in New York at the beginning of August of that year. Following a warm welcome, Cumming and 5th Marines marched up Fifth Avenue, and a few days later took part in the parade in Washington, D.C., where President Woodrow Wilson reviewed the unit.

Upon the disbandment of the 5th Marine Regiment at Quantico, Virginia, on August 13, Captain Cumming joined Lem Shepherd and they were attached to the special party under Major Charles D. Barrett. This party was sent back to France at the beginning of September 1919 in order to make a relief map of battlefields on which Marines fought. During his service in Europe, Cumming received the Silver Medal of Bravery from the Government of Montenegro.

Everybody returned to the United States in January 1920 and spent the next six months with work on the maps. These maps can be found at the Smithsonian Institution today. Cumming was subsequently assigned back to the Marine Barracks Quantico and assumed command of the Engineer Battalion there in December 1921.

In August 1922, Cumming was attached to the First Provisional Marine Brigade under Colonel Theodore P. Kane and sailed for his first expeditionary duty in Haiti. He served as an instructor with Garde d'Haïti and took part in the actions against the Cacos rebels. Cumming served in the Caribbean until February 1926, when he was ordered back to the United States.

Following his return, he was ordered to the Staff Course at Marine Corps Schools Quantico, and graduated in May 1927. The next tour of expeditionary duties followed, when Cumming was ordered to China as a member of Third Marine Brigade under Brigadier General Smedley D. Butler. Cumming spent one year with guard duty at Shanghai International Settlement and returned to the United States in July 1928.

Cumming then served at the Marine barracks at Puget Sound Navy Yard in Bremerton, Washington, and subsequently went for expeditionary duty to the Virgin Islands in the Caribbean in November 1929. Following his return stateside at the end of June 1931, he was attached to the Marine Corps Base Quantico, Virginia, and served there before he was ordered to the staff course at Command and General Staff College at Fort Leavenworth, Kansas, in August 1932. He was promoted to the rank of major on November 1, 1932.

Major Cumming graduated in the spring of 1933 and subsequently went to Washington, D.C., for the senior course at Army War College. He was ordered back to Quantico in June 1935 and appointed an instructor and department chief at Marine Corps Schools under the command of future Commandant, Thomas Holcomb. Cumming received a promotion to the rank of lieutenant colonel in October 1935.

During June 1937, he was transferred to the staff of Scouting Force under Vice Admiral Adolphus Andrews and appointed force Marine officer aboard the heavy cruiser USS Indianapolis.

== World War II ==
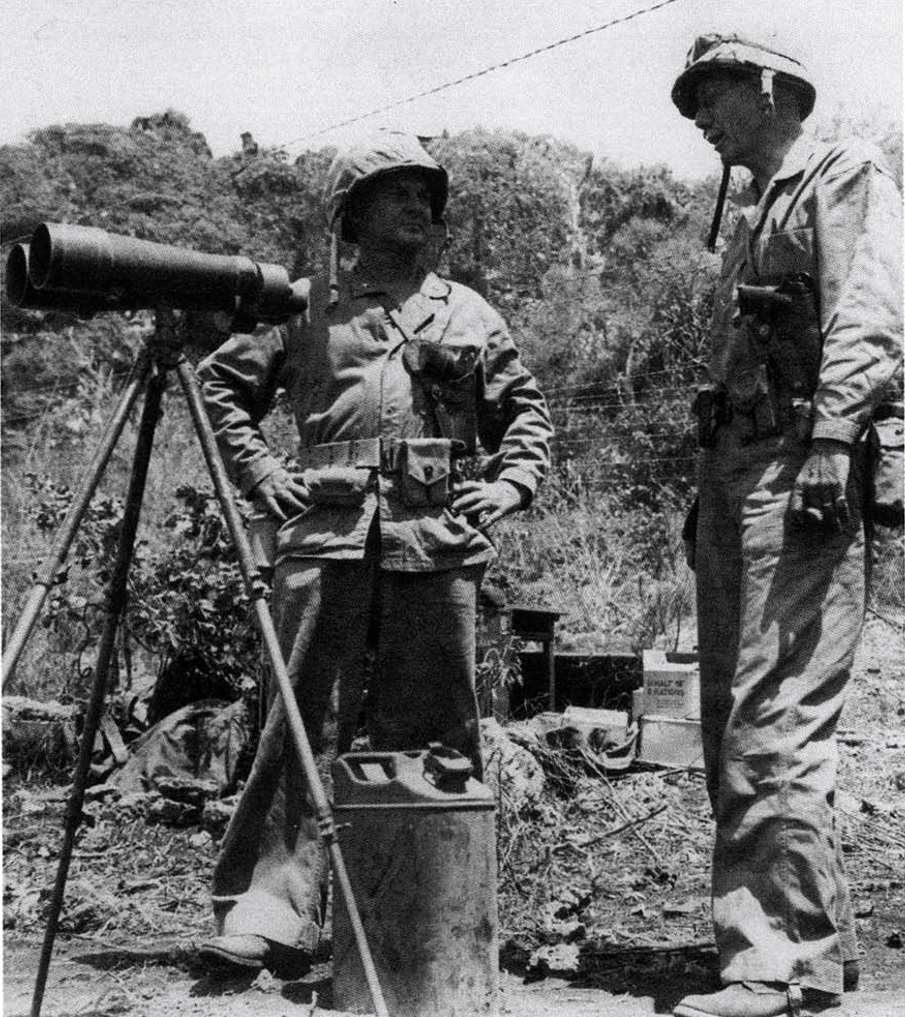
BG Samuel C. Cumming (4th Marine Division) discusses the situation with Col. Merton J. Batchelder (25th Marines) near Hill 500 on Saipan, June 1944.

Cumming completed his tour of sea duty in June 1939 and subsequently went to the Headquarters Marine Corps. While in Washington, D.C., Cumming was attached to the office of Adjutant and Inspector of the Marine Corps under Brigadier General Edward A. Ostermann and helped with the reorganization of the Personnel Branch. He also served as Acting Adjutant and Inspector of the Marine Corps during that time and was promoted to the rank of colonel on March 1, 1941.

With the increasing need of the Marine Corps units during the allied advance in Pacific, new units were activated all over the training camps in the United States and prepared for combat deployment. The 25th Marine Regiment was one of these units which was activated at the beginning of May 1943 from the cadre of the 23rd Marine Regiment at Camp Lejeune, North Carolina.

Colonel Cumming was appointed commanding officer of the 25th Marine Regiment at the end of July 1943. He relieved Colonel Richard H. Schubert in command of the regiment and continued in extensive training. He and his men subsequently sailed to Camp Pendleton, California, via the Panama Canal and arrived there on September 10, 1943. Cumming and his regiment were then attached to 4th Marine Division under Major General Harry Schmidt and began with preparations for the upcoming Kwajalein Operation.

He also took part in the landing exercise on San Clemente Island at the beginning of January 1944 and 25th Marines left San Diego on January 13. They reached Hawaii on January 22 and then sailed to Kwajalein Atoll in the Marshall Islands. The main goal was to secure the atoll and get that a new base for future offensives. His regiment was designated a part of the Northern Landing Force, which took part in the capturing of Roi-Namur, the center of air activity in the Marshall Islands.

Cumming and his Marines were tasked with the capturing of the small off-shore islands, which should serve as artillery sites for fire support of advancing units. The units under Cumming's command secured the islands of Melu and Ennuebing and allowed the deployment of 14th Marine Regiment 75mm pack howitzers. Colonel Cumming then landed on Melu Island and subsequently deployed his command post there. He then directed the cleaning of all other islands around Roi-Namur.

After Roi-Namur and all nearby islands were declared secured on February 3, Cumming and his regiment were detached from the 4th Marine Division and designated Atoll Garrison Force. He remained in this capacity until February 8, when he was relieved by new atoll commander, Rear Admiral Alva D. Bernhard. However, he remained at Roi-Namur until the end of the month, when his regiment was ordered to Hawaii to rejoin his 4th Division. For his merits during the planning and subsequent leadership of the 25th Marines during the campaign, Cumming was decorated with the Legion of Merit.

In addition to his decoration, Cumming was promoted to the rank of brigadier general in April 1944 and appointed to the capacity of assistant division commander, 4th Marine Division. In this capacity, he replaced Brigadier General James L. Underhill and subsequently began with the preparing for the next target – the Mariana Islands. This archipelago, consisting of the islands of Saipan, Tinian and Guam, was chosen because of its strategic position and future use as an aerodrome for allied air raids on enemy positions in Japan and the Philippines.

An assault on Saipan was commenced on June 15, 1944, and the 4th Marine Division was tasked with capturing Aslito airfield in the southern end of the island and advancing north along the east coast. The Fourth Division assaulted Hill 500, an enemy strongpoint in the southern part of Saipan, on June 20, and finished the advance by capturing of Marpi Point Field on July 9, when an island was declared secured.

Following the Saipan battle, the 4th Marine Division got a new commander, Major General Clifton B. Cates. Cumming remained in the capacity of assistant division commander under him, and led his 4th Marine Division during the amphibious landing on Tinian on July 24, 1944. Shortly after the landing, Japanese units commenced the large night counterattack with tanks and support infantry using Banzai charges. An attack was successfully repelled and 1241 enemy bodies were around the defense perimeter. The 4th Division subsequently captured the enemy airfield in construction and the town of San Jose. On August 1, an island was declared secured after only nine days of fighting. For his service in Marianas, Cumming received the Bronze Star Medal with Combat "V".

Cumming sailed with the 4th Division back to Hawaii for rest and refit, and subsequently was succeeded by Brigadier General Franklin A. Hart on August 29, 1944. Cumming was then transferred to the Marine Corps Base Quantico, Virginia, where he served as chief of staff under Major General Philip H. Torrey. In this capacity, he was co-responsible for the training and education of Marine Corps officers, and institutions like Marine Corps Schools, the Basic School and Officer Candidates School were under his responsibility.

== Postwar life ==
Brigadier General Cumming retired from the active service on November 1, 1946, after 29 years of commissioned service. Upon retirement, he was advanced to the rank of major general for having been specially commended for performance of duty in actual combat.

He and his wife Eula moved to Upperville, Virginia, where they successfully ran the 600-acre cattle farm. During his time in Upperville, Cumming was active as a layman in the Episcopal Churchn. He also worked as treasurer and senior warden of Trinity Church in Upperville. Cumming was named to the county planning commission in October 1955.

Cumming stayed in touch with his alma mater, Virginia Military Institute, and besides maintaining correspondence with VMI officials, he was a supporter of the VMI Annual Fund and VMI Keydets.

He later moved to Sarasota, Florida, where he lived until his death in Sarasota Memorial Hospital on January 14, 1983. He was survived by his wife Eula and two sons, Samuel Jr. and Allan.

== Decorations ==
Here is the ribbon bar of Major General Samuel C. Cumming:

1st Row	Silver Star with two 5/16" Gold Stars	Legion of Merit	Bronze Star Medal with Combat "V"	Purple Heart with Oak Leaf Cluster
2nd Row	Navy Presidential Unit Citation with one star	Marine Corps Expeditionary Medal with two service stars	World War I Victory Medal with four battle clasps	Army of Occupation of Germany Medal
3rd Row	Yangtze Service Medal	American Defense Service Medal	American Campaign Medal	Asiatic-Pacific Campaign Medal with two 3/16 inch service stars
4th Row	World War II Victory Medal	French Croix de guerre 1914–1918 with two Gilt Stars	Knight of Order of the Star of Romania	Silver Medal of Bravery (Montenegro)
