= USS Napa (APA-157) =

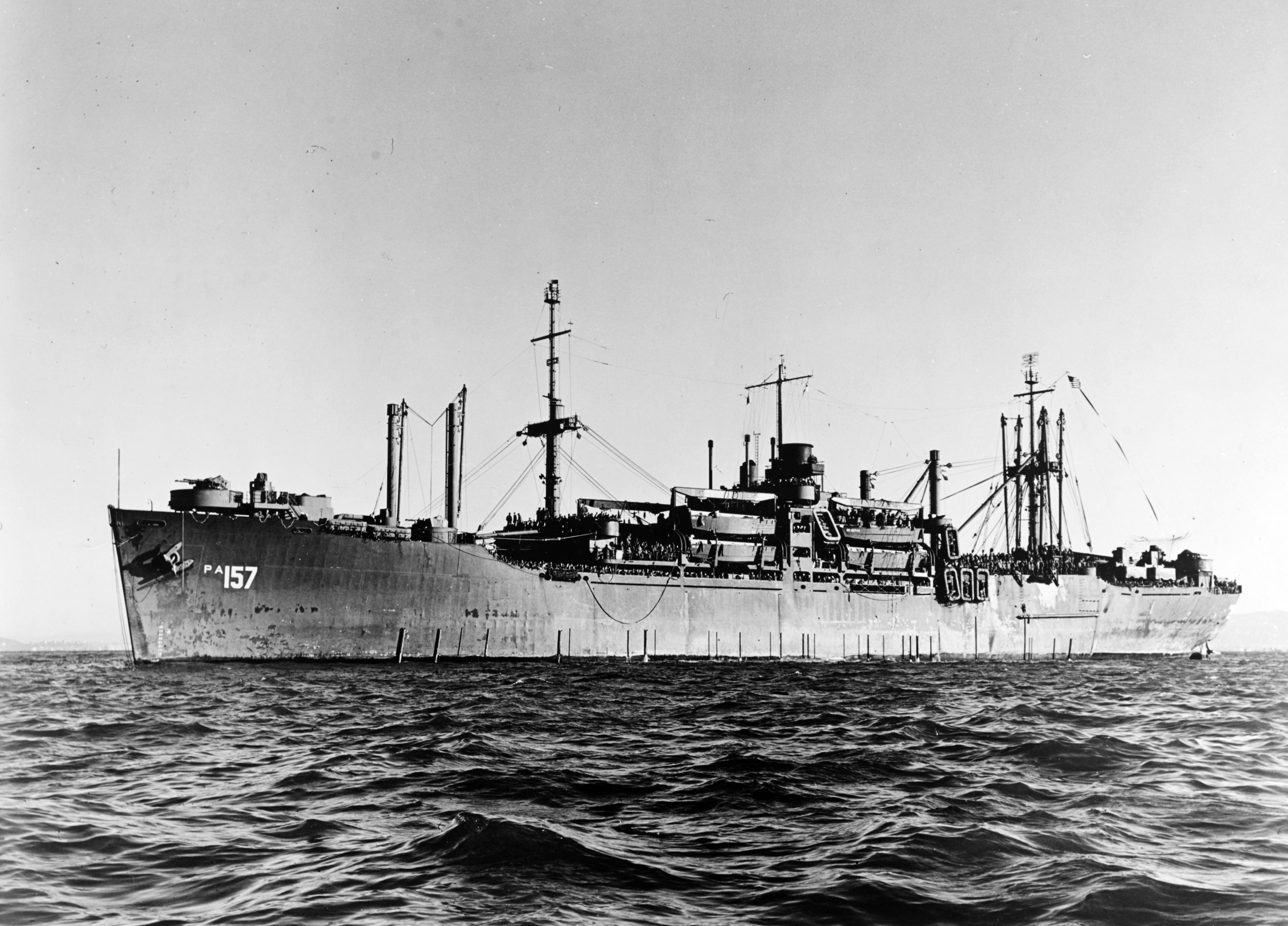

History

United States
- Name: USS Napa
- Namesake: Napa County, California
- Builder: Oregon Shipbuilding Corporation, Portland, Oregon
- Laid down: 7 June 1944
- Launched: 12 August 1944
- Commissioned: 1 October 1944
- Decommissioned: 24 May 1946
- Reclassified: LPA-157, 1 January 1969
- Stricken: 17 June 1946
- Honors and awards: 1 battle star (World War II)
- Fate: Sold for scrap, 17 May 1983

General characteristics
- Class & type: Haskell-class attack transport
- Displacement: 14,833 long tons (15,071 t) full
- Length: 455 ft (139 m)
- Beam: 62 ft (19 m)
- Draft: 28 ft 1 in (8.56 m)
- Speed: 17.7 knots (32.8 km/h; 20.4 mph)
- Complement: 536 officers and enlisted
- Armament: 1 × 5"/38 caliber guns; 12 × 40 mm guns

USS Napa (APA-157) was a Haskell-class attack transport in service with the United States Navy from 1944 to 1946. She was scrapped in 1983.

== History ==
Napa was laid down under Maritime Commission contract (MCV hull 123) on 7 June 1944 by the Oregon Shipbuilding Corporation, of Portland, Oregon; launched in August 1944; sponsored by Mrs. Cranston Williams; acquired from the Maritime Commission on a loan-charter basis and commissioned on 1 October 1944.

=== World War II ===
Following shakedown exercises off the California coast, Napa took on Seabee units at Port Hueneme and sailed, on 25 November, for Hawaii on the first leg of her westward journey to the combat area in the Western Pacific. Arriving at Pearl Harbor on 2 December, she was assigned to Transport Division 44, Amphibious Forces, Pacific Fleet, and for the next month trained with 1st Battalion 25th Marines of the 4th Marine Division preparing for the invasion of Iwo Jima. On 27 January 1945, the attack transport got underway as part of TF 51. From 11 February through the 15th, she underwent further training at Tinian, departing on the 16th for the Volcano Islands.

Eight miles off Iwo Jima by dawn on the 19th, Napa commenced lowering her boats at 0641, thus allowing sufficient time for the landing craft to cover the distance to the Blue Beaches on the southeastern coast of the island for H-hour, 0900. The first waves, in LVT's, went ashore on schedule, but were slowed at the first volcanic terrace. Without protection, the marines were vulnerable to fire from Japanese pillboxes, and gun and mortar positions on higher ground to the north of the beaches. The fire from those positions, which could be knocked out only by a direct hit, soon began to take its toll and the attack transports began to move in to receive the wounded. By noon, Napa had proceeded from the line of departure to take on casualties. Retiring that night, she returned early the next morning to continue debarking troops and cargo and to take on wounded personnel. Returning again on the morning of the 21st, she was rammed by Logan (APA-196) at about 0445. The resulting hole in her hull, frames 98–102, was 15 feet long and extended down to a point 10 feet beyond the turn of the bilge. Fast action on the part of the crew and the remaining Marine personnel, waiting for debarkation, precluded casualties even among the evacuees; limited flooding to No. 4 hold, and prevented any fires from breaking out in that hold which contained high octane gas.

After assuring the water-tightness of the remaining holds, the "Victory" ship resumed her duties, remaining in the Iwo Jima area until the 24th. She then departed for Guam where repairs were started. On 25 March she continued to Pearl Harbor, arriving early the next month. There, Capt. F. Kent Loomis took command of the ship on 14 April. A month later, Napa got underway for Seattle, whence she sailed, on 20 June, for Okinawa with Army units embarked. She arrived at Machinato Anchorage on 5 August, discharged her cargo and passengers, and started back across the Pacific, reaching Saipan on 14 August to receive the word of the Japanese surrender and orders to the Philippines.

Arriving in the Philippines in mid-September, she commenced transporting occupation troops to the Japanese home islands including elements of the 8th Army to Yokohama. The ship was then assigned to Operation Beleaguer to transport 6th Marine Division personnel to Tsingtao. She sailed next to French Indochina to ferry units of the 62nd Chinese Army from Hai Phong to Takao, Formosa. On 24 November she reported to ComPhilSeaFron for "Magic Carpet" duty, departing on the 27th for California with Army personnel on board.

Anchoring in San Francisco Bay, on 16 December, she got underway again for Operation Beleaguer and China, on 4 January 1946, returning to the United States on 24 February. On 1 March she departed San Diego for the east coast.

=== Decommissioning and fate ===
She arrived at Norfolk on the 16th and decommissioned at Baltimore on 24 May 1946. She was returned to the Maritime Commission on 30 May and was laid up as part of the MARAD Reserve Fleet at James River, Virginia, where she remained until 17 September 1983 when she was sold for scrap.

== Awards ==
Napa (APA–157) received one battle star for her service during World War II.
