= 1st Battalion, 25th Marines =

1st Battalion, 25th Marine Regiment
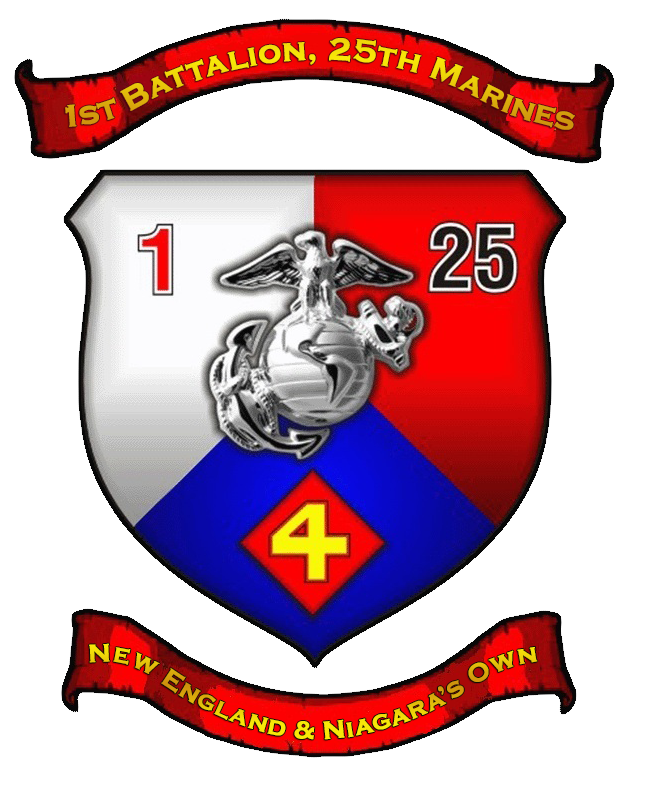
- 1st Battalion, 25th Marines insignia
- Active: Early 1920s
- Country: United States of America
- Branch: United States Marine Corps
- Type: Infantry battalion
- Role: To locate, close with, and destroy the enemy by fire and maneuver, or repel the enemy's assault by fire and close combat.
- Size: 1000
- Part of: 25th Marine Regiment; 4th Marine Division
- Garrison/HQ: Fort Devens, Massachusetts
- Nickname: New England's Own
- Motto: Semper Fidelis
- Engagements: World War II: Battle of Kwajalein; Battle of Saipan; Battle of Tinian; Battle of Iwo Jima; Operation Desert Storm; War on terror: Operation Enduring Freedom; Operation Iraqi Freedom

Commanders
- Current commander: LtCol Mark A Capansky Jr

1st Battalion, 25th Marines (1/25) is a reserve infantry battalion in the United States Marine Corps located throughout New England and upstate New York and consisting of approximately 850 Marines and Sailors. The battalion falls under the 25th Marine Regiment in the 4th Marine Division.

== Current Units ==
Name	Location
H&S Company	Fort Devens, Massachusetts
Alpha Company	Brunswick, Maine
Bravo Company	Londonderry, New Hampshire
Charlie Company	Buffalo, New York
Weapons Company	Fort Devens, Massachusetts

== History ==
=== Early years ===
1st Battalion, 25th Marines was originally established in Boston, Massachusetts as an infantry company in the early 1920s. It was not until some years later that the unit attained battalion status.

In April 1926, Captain John J. Flynn was named the commanding officer of the 301st Company, USMCR, with headquarters at the Marine Barracks, Charlestown Navy Yard. Building 5, the Navy officers mess, was used for drill and formation until the company was called to active duty on November 8, 1940.

During its history, the 1st Battalion, 25th Marines has undergone some re-designations, from its beginning as the 301st Company, the battalion has been variously re-designated as an artillery company (December 29, 1928); the 301st Infantry Company (December 1, 1929); Company A, 1st Battalion, 19th Reserve Marines (February 15, 1933); 2nd Battalion, Fleet Marine Corps Reserve (February 1, 1935) — at that point, a battalion had an authorized strength of 256 men, comparable to a reinforced infantry company in today's table of organization.

An especially critical and challenging period in the life of New England's Own occurred from 1931 to 1934, when Congress discontinued all drill and administrative pay. Those stalwarts who stayed with the organization did so voluntarily and without pay. New members were required to purchase their own uniforms. The fact that the battalion survived this critical period is a banner on its history.

=== World War II & the Cold War ===
The 2nd Battalion continued as a unit until called to active service on the eve of World War II. The battalion was sent to Marine Corps Base Quantico, Virginia, and then to Cuba where it was split in January 1941 to serve with various units serving in Cuba at the time.

On May 1, 1943, the 1st Battalion, 25th Marines was formed at Camp Lejeune, North Carolina, and was then shipped off to Camp Pendleton, California, to be assigned to the 4th Marine Division. During the war, the 1st Battalion, 25th Marines saw action in the following Island-hopping campaigns: Kwajalein, Battle of Saipan, Battle of Tinian, and the Battle of Iwo Jima. The battalion played a critical role in the seizure of Hill 382 (Turkey Knob) in an area that Marines on Iwo Jima called "the meat grinder". For its actions, the battalion earned a Presidential Unit Citation. The battalion saw no further action during the war due to having to rebuild the battalion after the heavy losses on Iwo Jima. The battalion was deactivated on October 31, 1945.

After World War II, on October 1, 1946, the 2nd Infantry Battalion was activated at the Naval and Marine Corps Training Center in South Boston under the command of Lieutenant Colonel James J. Dugan, who had established an excellent personal record as a member of the battalion before the war and distinguished himself by outstanding service during World War II. Lieutenant Colonel Dugan remained the commanding officer until July 1950, shortly before the battalion was called to active duty during the Korean War. The unit's mobilization during the Korean War was short lived, and the battalion was quickly returned to Boston in October 1951, where it grew into one of the largest Marine Reserve units in the country.

On July 1, 1962, the battalion was reorganized and re-designated in conjunction with the new concept and mission of the Marine Corps Reserve as the 1st Battalion, 25th Marines, 4th Marine Division, Fleet Marine Force, Massachusetts. On September 30, 1977, the headquarters was relocated to Camp Edwards, Cape Cod, Massachusetts.

Since its reorganization in 1962, the battalion has participated in a variety of training experiences, including desert maneuvers at 29 Palms, California; amphibious training in Little Creek, Virginia; Mountain Warfare Training at Bridgeport, California; cold weather training in Norway, and numerous field exercises at Camp Lejeune, North Carolina. Attesting to the effective role that the unit played in these and other programs, the 1st Battalion, 25th Marines received the General Harry Schmidt trophy for the most combat ready battalion in the 4th Marine Division in 1970, 1989, and 1990.

=== The Gulf War & the 1990s ===
On November 25, 1990, the battalion was again called to active duty to serve in the Gulf War against Iraq. The battalion moved to Camp Lejeune, North Carolina and then promptly deployed to the Kuwait theater operations on December 29, 1990. The battalion was assigned as an independent battalion within the 1st Marine Division. While attached to the 1st Marine Division, it performed a variety of missions to include rear area security and enemy prisoner of war (POW) control. The battalion was with the front-line units during the war, which made it one of the few reserve units to see front-line service. During the ground offensive I Marine Expeditionary Force tasked the battalion to receive and control over 8,500 Iraq POWs, guarding and processing them to rear areas of the 1st Marine Division. The battalion was returned to the United States in April 1991 and was deactivated at Camp Edwards, Massachusetts.

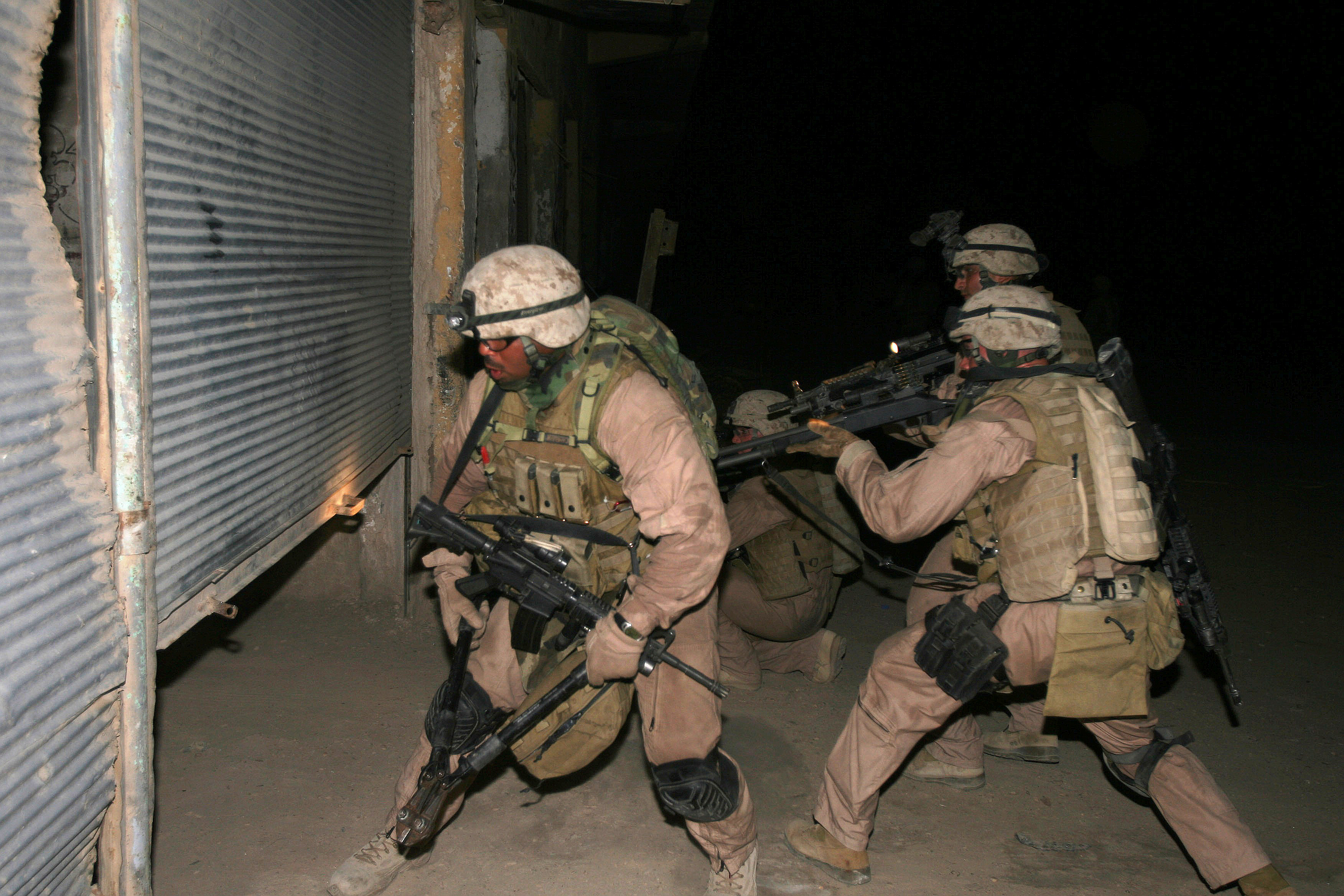
Marines from 1/25 conduct a raid in the city of Fallujah in June 2006

On June 9, 2000, the battalion headquarters was relocated from Camp Edwards to Devens Reserve Forces Training Area (RFTA), Massachusetts, the site of the recently deactivated Fort Devens US Army base. The battalion is still performing its mission of training for the possible call-up for active service in times of national emergency out of Fort Devens and company training centers. Today the battalion is spread over the New England and upstate New York area with the Headquarters and Service Company along with the Weapons Company located at Fort Devens RFTA, Massachusetts. Company A is located in Brunswick, Maine; Company B is located in Londonderry, New Hampshire; and Company C, formerly located in Hartford, Connecticut and later Plainville, Connecticut during the 1980's and early 1990's, is now located in Buffalo, New York.

=== The Global War on Terror ===
In January 2003, the battalion was activated in support of Operation Enduring Freedom. After a work-up at Camp Lejuene, NC, the battalion's companies Alpha, Bravo, Charlie, Weapons and H & S Companies were deployed to the Pacific and Mid-East (Okinawa{Japan}, Philippines, Korea and Bahrain) carrying out Security and Training missions (i.e. Security Force for Ulchi Focus Lens {Korea} & Exercise Talon Vision {Philippines}) . Charlie Co. operated and conducted missions out of Bahrain where its detachments of Marines conducted security operations in the Persian Gulf as well as the Iraqi territorial waters to include the Euphrates River.

On 21 March 2006, after three months of training at the Marine Corps Air Ground Combat Center Twentynine Palms, California, the battalion was deployed to the exceptionally violent province of Anbar in Iraq, then the headquarters of al-Qaeda in Iraq and its leader, Abu Musab al-Zarqawi. The deployment lasted seven months.

During the deployment, 1/25 operated in the city of Fallujah under the command of Regimental Combat Team 5. Fallujah had previously served as the primary insurgent stronghold in Iraq until American forces launched a bloody campaign in November 2004 to re-take the city in what is known as the Second Battle of Fallujah. By the time 1/25 deployed to al-Anbar, al-Qaeda in Iraq had re-established its headquarters further west in the provincial capital of Ramadi, leading to the 2006 Battle of Ramadi.

The battalion performed thousands of patrols throughout Fallujah and participated in a number of regimental sized operations. During this same timeframe, US forces made significant progress in eliminating some of al-Qaeda in Iraq's top leadership: a 7 June 2006 airstrike killed al-Zarqawi and his spiritual advisor Sheik Abd-Al-Rahman while the organization's reputed second-in-command, Hamid Juma Faris Jouri al-Saeedi, was captured in a joint US/Iraqi raid on 19 June 2006.

In October 2006, the unit returned home to New England. Attachments from 2nd Battalion 25th Marines and the Oklahoma "TOW" Unit returned to their respective drill centers. Eleven members of the battalion were killed in action, while a total of 141 Marines were killed in Anbar during the seven calendar months that 1/25 was deployed.

In August 2011 the battalion was deployed to Afghanistan in support of Operation Enduring Freedom. While some companies conducted combat operations, others were divided across the country to train and advise the Afghan National Army (ANA)and Afghan Police at various levels of law enforcement jurisdictions. Additionally, the battalion served as advisers to the Jordanian efforts. No Marines or sailors were lost during the seven-month deployment.

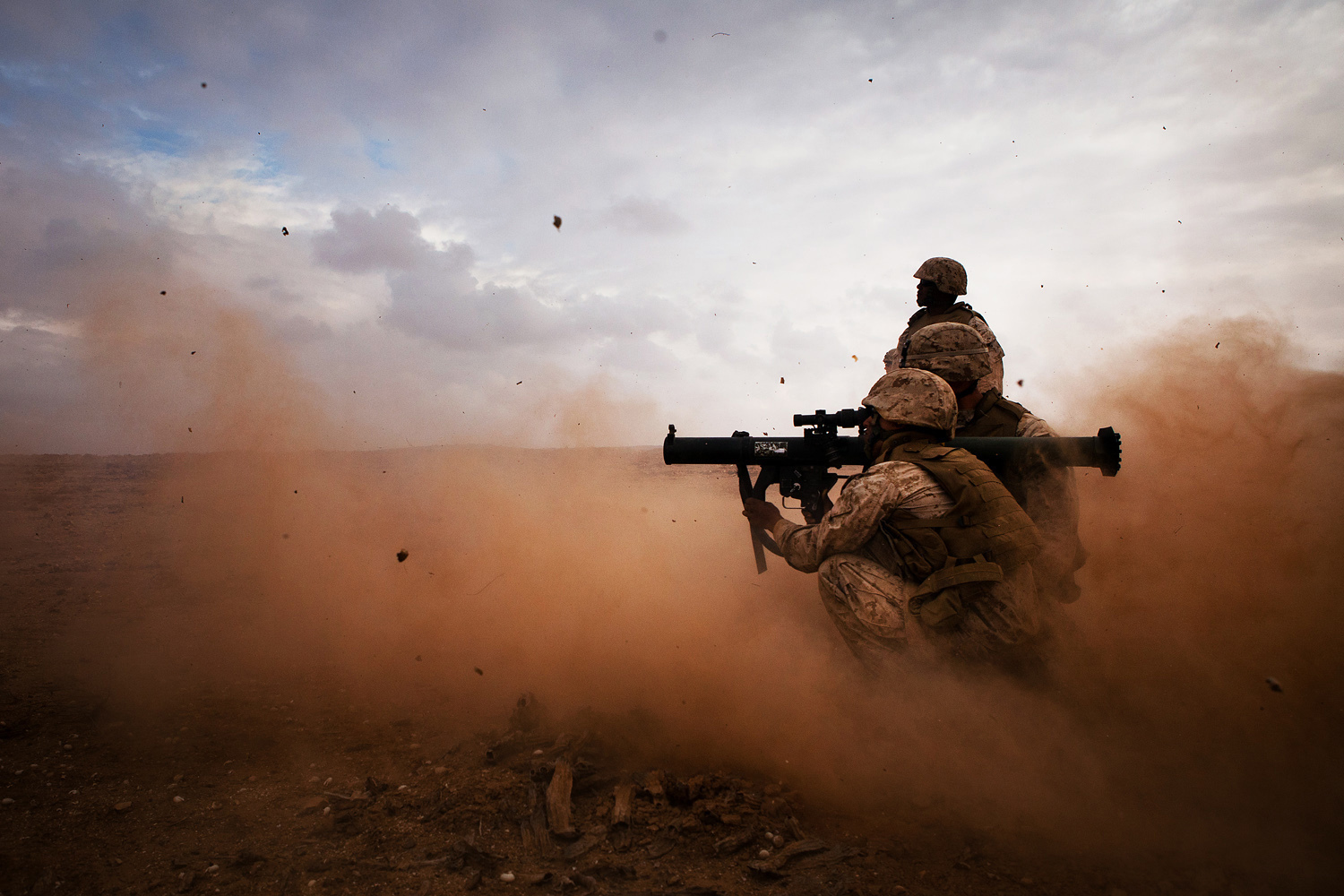
A U.S. Marine with 1/25 fires a shoulder-launched multipurpose assault weapon during a small-arms live-fire exercise in Cap Draa, Morocco, during exercise African Lion 2012

=== Operational Reserve ===
Following the battalion's redeployment from Afghanistan, the unit began a period of "routine" reserve service and training, participating in annual training exercises at the Marine Corps Air-Ground Combat Center in 29 Palms, California (Integrated Training Exercise), the Marine Corps Mountain Warfare Training Center near Bridgeport, California (Mountain Warfare Exercise), and the AFRICOM theater security cooperation exercise AFRICAN LION in Morocco.

1/25 mobilized with enablers and attachments in June 2019 for pre-deployment training in Virginia and 29 Palms, deploying to Okinawa in October 2019 as part of the Unit Deployment Program 20.1. Attached to 4th Marines at Camp Schwab in Okinawa, the companies and platoons of the battalion conducted bilateral training and exercises in Japan, the Philippines, and Korea, including several cold weather and extreme cold weather exercises. Elements of the battalion also executed the unit program of instruction at the Jungle Warfare Training Center on Okinawa. The COVID-19 global pandemic exploded while the battalion was spread between Japan, Okinawa, Korea, and the Philippines, resulting in a difficult consolidation and delayed redeployment home. The battalion demobilized in July, 2020.

The battalion returned to a standard reserve unit training and readiness program in the summer of 2020, conducting training with added precautions during the continuing COVID-19 global pandemic.

=== Unit Awards ===
- Presidential Unit Citation with one Bronze Star
- Navy Unit Commendation

Meritorious Unit Commendation

- Asiatic-Pacific Campaign Medal with four Bronze Stars
- World War II Victory Medal
- National Defense Service Medal with one Bronze Star
- Southwest Asia Service Medal with two Bronze Stars
- Iraq Campaign Medal
- Global War on Terrorism Expeditionary Medal
- Global War on Terrorism Service Medal

== See also ==
- List of United States Marine Corps battalions
- Organization of the United States Marine Corps
