= Merton J. Batchelder =

United States Marine Corps general

Merton Jennings Batchelder
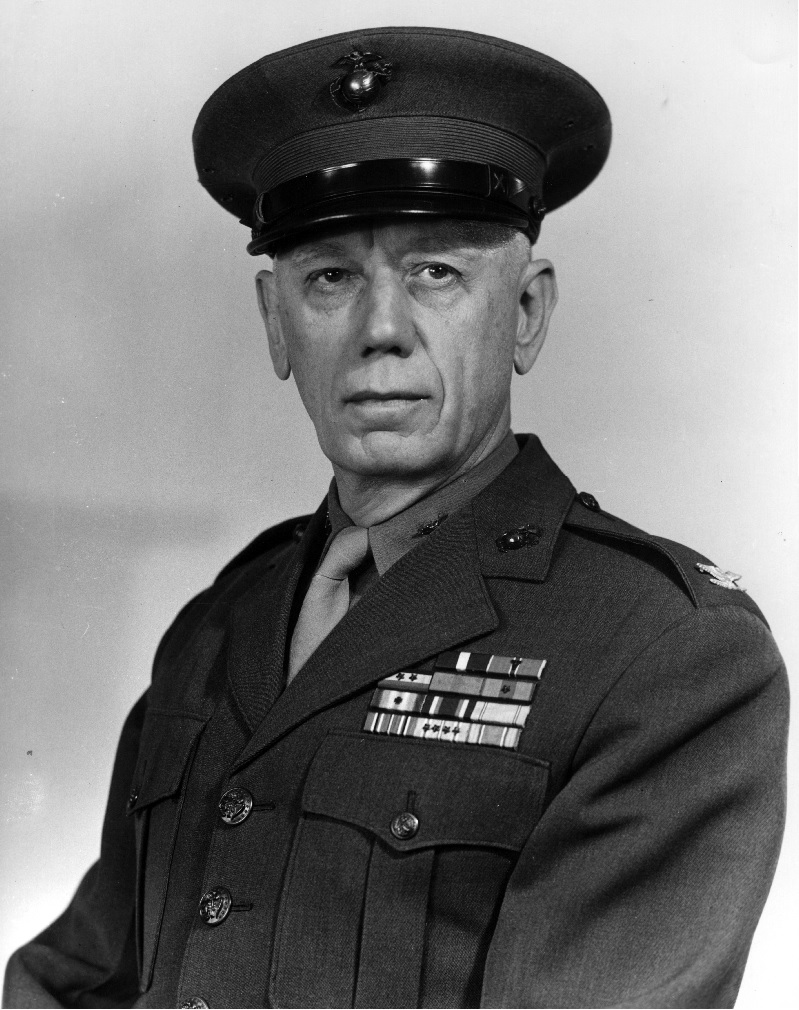
- Batchelder as colonel, USMC
- Born: March 5, 1896; New Bedford, Massachusetts, US
- Died: November 26, 1975 (aged 79)
- Burial place: Arlington National Cemetery
- Military career
- Allegiance: United States of America
- Branch: United States Marine Corps
- Service years: 1917–1949
- Rank: Brigadier general
- Service number: 0-53
- Commands: CoS of 4th Marine Division; 25th Marine Regiment
- Conflicts: World War I; Occupation of the Dominican Republic; World War II; Battle of Kwajalein; Battle of Saipan; Battle of Tinian; Battle of Iwo Jima
- Awards: Navy Cross; Bronze Star Medal

Merton Jennings Batchelder (March 5, 1896 – November 26, 1975) was a United States Marine Corps brigadier general who served as commanding officer of the 25th Marine Regiment and later as chief of staff of the 4th Marine Division during World War II.

== Early career ==
Batchelder was born on March 5, 1896, in New Bedford, Massachusetts, and attended local public schools. During World War I, he enlisted in the Marine Corps as private in June 1917. After finishing of the Recruit Training, Batchelder was sent to Virgin Islands in September 1917, where he was promoted to the rank of sergeant and decorated with Marine Corps Good Conduct Medal.

He was sent to France within 13th Marine Regiment. However, Batchelder didn't participate in the combat duties and was stationed for the rest of the war in the city of Brest. During his service there, he was commissioned second lieutenant in August 1918. Batchelder returned to the United States in July 1919 and was assigned to the Marine Barracks Quantico, Virginia. He subsequently sailed for Santo Domingo, Dominican Republic as a member of the Second Brigade of Marines in December 1919. Batchelder was promoted to the rank of first lieutenant in March 1921.

== World War II ==
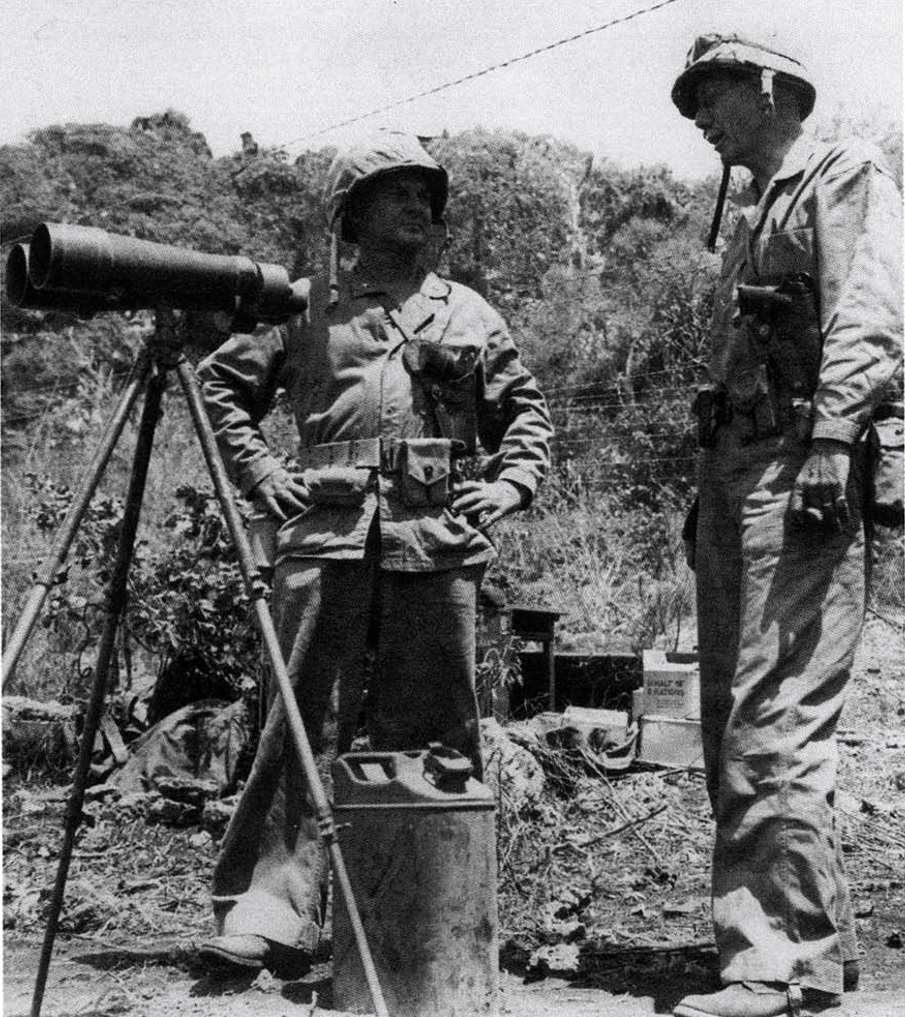
BG Samuel C. Cumming (4th Marine Division) discusses the situation with Col. Merton J. Batchelder (25th Marines) near Hill 500 on Saipan, June 1944.

Batchelder reported at Camp Pendleton, California, in August 1943, where new 4th Marine Division was activated under the command of Major General Harry Schmidt. He was appointed division personnel officer at the same time and was responsible for the essential administrative liaison between the subordinate units and the headquarters.

He sailed with the division to the Pacific in January 1944 and participated in the subsequent Battle of Kwajalein. Batchelder was appointed commanding officer of the 25th Marine Regiment in April 1944, relieving Colonel Samuel C. Cumming, who was promoted and appointed assistant division commander. He subsequently commanded the regiment during the Saipan operation.

During the following Battle of Tinian at the end of July 1944, Batchelder landed on the beachhead with first waves under heavy enemy fire and was able to repel counterattacks and establish defense line. For his leadership and gallantry in action, he was decorated with the Navy Cross. Batchelder also received the Navy Presidential Unit Citation.

=== Navy Cross citation ===
His official Navy Cross citation reads follows:

The President of the United States of America takes pleasure in presenting the Navy Cross to Colonel Merton Jennings Batchelder (MCSN: 0-53), United States Marine Corps, for extraordinary heroism as Commanding Officer of the Twenty-Fifth Marines, FOURTH Marine Division, during action against enemy Japanese forces at Tinian, Marianas Islands, from 24 July to 2 August 1944. Landing on the heavily fortified beachhead with the first assault wave on D-Day in the face of intense, concentrated enemy mortar, machine-gun and artillery fire, Colonel Batchelder fearlessly directed his command in seizing the vital area, establishing a beachhead line and holding it against repeated vicious counterattacks by a fanatic enemy until the full force of our supporting elements could be landed. Continuing his unceasing efforts, he contributed to the success of his regiment in repelling a determined pre-dawn counterattack the following day and, thereafter, supervised brilliantly executed, daily attacks against a ruthless and determined enemy, remaining in the field with his front line troops through the entire operation, inspiring his men to greater efforts and coordinating the activities of his regiment in capturing this vital Japanese stronghold. His valiant leadership, outstanding fortitude and great personal valor, maintained at great personal risk, reflect the highest credit upon Colonel Batchelder, his gallant command and the United States Naval Service.

Batchelder remained in command of the regiment until 31 October 1944, when he was appointed chief of staff of 4th Marine Division. He succeeded Colonel Matthew C. Horner at this post. He served in this capacity during the Battle of Iwo Jima in February 1945 and was decorated with the Bronze Star Medal with Combat "V" for his service and also another Navy Presidential Unit Citation.

== Postwar career ==
Batchelder served in this capacity until 9 April 1945, when he was ordered back to the United States. He was subsequently assigned to the Headquarters Marine Corps, Washington, D.C., where he was appointed Chief of Detail Branch in June 1945. Batchelder remained at headquarters and was then appointed assistant director of personnel. He served in this capacity until 30 June 1949, when he retired from the Marine Corps. Batchelder was advanced to the rank of brigadier general for having been specially commended in combat.

Batchelder died on November 26, 1975, and is buried at Arlington National Cemetery, Virginia, together with his wife Katherine. Together they had son, Merton J. Batchelder (1929–2013), USNA of 1951 and captain in the Marine Corps.

== Decorations ==

1st Row	Navy Cross		Bronze Star Medal with Combat "V"
2nd Row	Navy Presidential Unit Citation with two stars	Marine Corps Good Conduct Medal	World War I Victory Medal with West Indies battle clasp
3rd Row	Marine Corps Expeditionary Medal with one star	Yangtze Service Medal	American Defense Service Medal
4th Row	American Campaign Medal	Asiatic-Pacific Campaign Medal with four 3/16 inch service stars	World War II Victory Medal
