= 25th Marine Regiment (United States) =

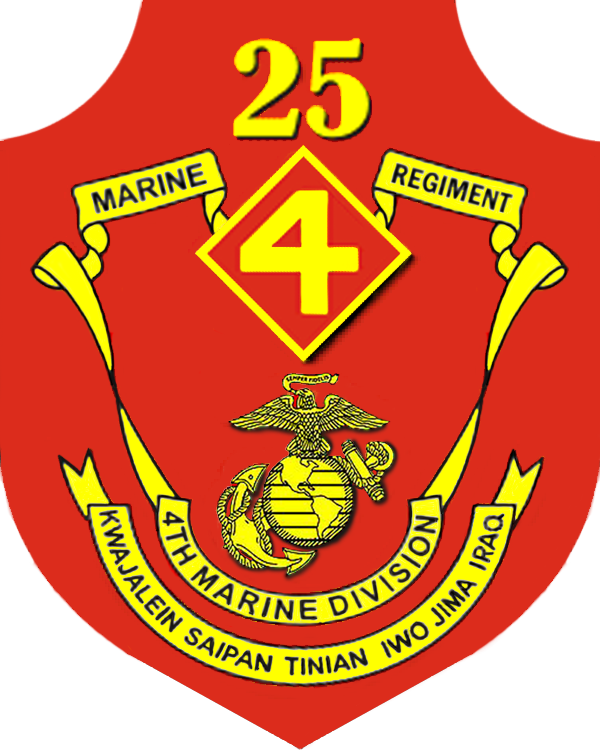
- 25th Marine Regiment insignia
- Active: 1943 – 45; 1962 – present
- Country: United States of America
- Branch: United States Marine Corps
- Type: Infantry
- Size: 3,500
- Part of: 4th Marine Division
- Garrison/HQ: Fort Devens, Massachusetts
- Nickname: "Cold Steel Warriors"
- Engagements: World War II; Battle of Kwajalein; Battle of Saipan; Battle of Tinian; Battle of Iwo Jima; Operation Desert Storm; War on terror; Operation Enduring Freedom; Operation Iraqi Freedom

Commanders
- Current commander: Colonel J. David Fleming
- Notable commanders: Samuel C. Cumming; Merton J. Batchelder

The 25th Marine Regiment (25th Marines) is one of two infantry regiments in the 4th Marine Division of the United States Marine Corps. From its headquarters in Fort Devens, Massachusetts, the regiment commands fifteen training centers in nine states throughout the Northeast. These units consist of approximately 3,500 reserve and active duty Marines and are located from Maine to Delaware, West Virginia and as far west as Ohio. The 25th Marines is primarily a cold weather regiment and frequently trains in northern Norway.

== Mission ==
Prepare for employment as a regiment tasked to plan and conduct combat operations in order to locate, close with, and destroy the enemy by fire and maneuver, or to repel his assault by close combat.

The reserve mission is to provide trained and qualified units and individuals to augment, reinforce, or reconstitute the active component of the Marine Corps in time of war, national emergency, and such other times as the national security may require.

== Organization ==
The regiment comprises three infantry battalions and a headquarters company. The regiment also has a support company that provides one anti-armor section to every infantry battalion in the 4th Marine Division except 4th LAR and 4th Recon.

- Headquarters Company - Fort Devens, Massachusetts
- 1st Battalion, 25th Marines (1/25) - Fort Devens, Massachusetts
- 2nd Battalion, 25th Marines (2/25) - Brooklyn, New York
- 3rd Battalion, 25th Marines (3/25) - Brook Park, Ohio
- 1st Battalion, 24th Marines (1/24) - Selfridge Air National Guard Base, Michigan
- Truck Company, 25th Marines - Erie, Pennsylvania
  - Detachment, Truck Company, 25th Marines - Folsom, Pennsylvania
- Anti-Tank Training Company - Broken Arrow, Oklahoma

== History ==
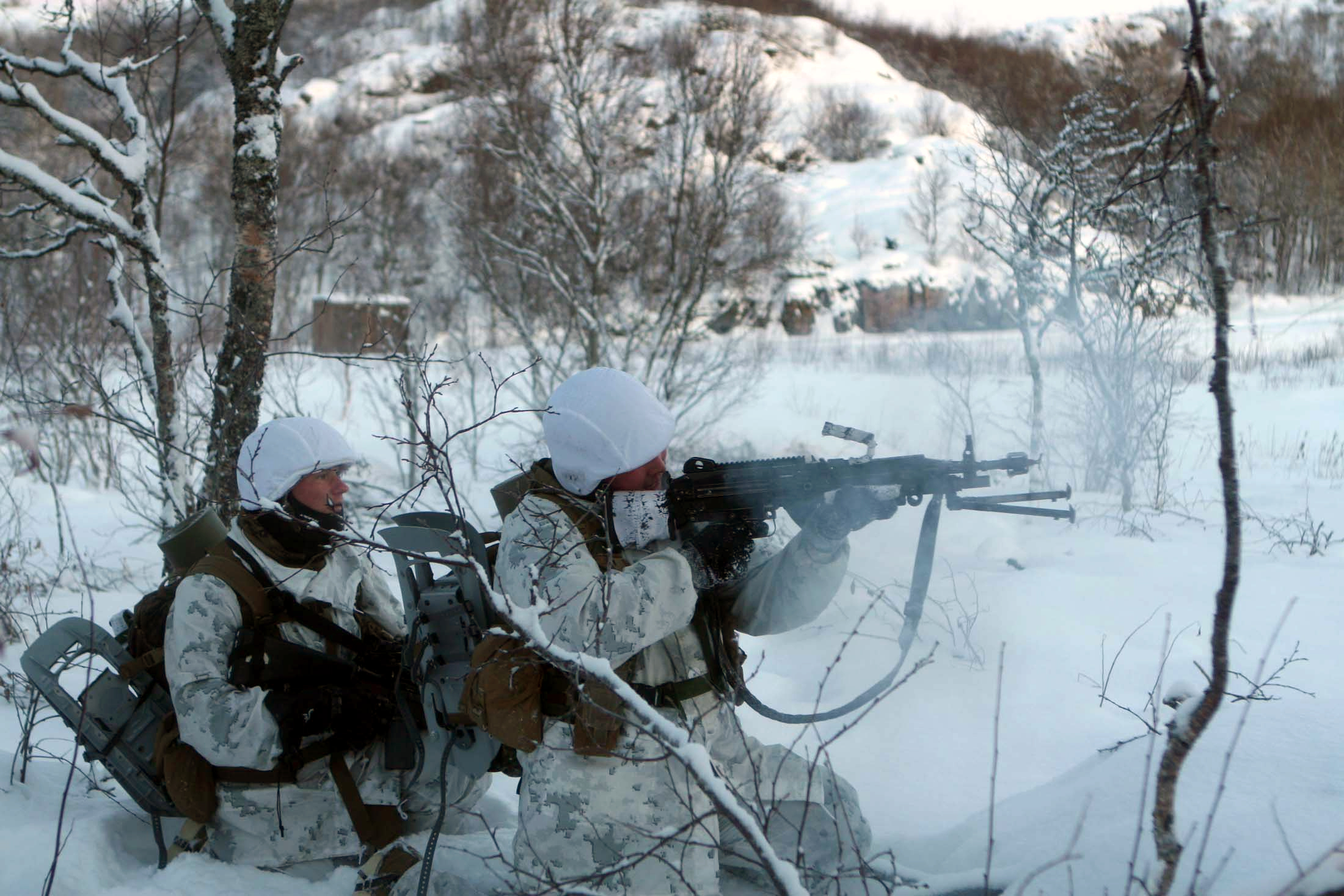
Marines with 2nd Battalion, 25th Regiment open fire upon a mock enemy force during a training raid while at Exercise Cold Response 2010 in Norway.

The 25th Marines was activated on 1 May 1943, at Marine Corps Base Camp Lejeune, North Carolina and was initially composed of Marines from throughout the Northeast. The regiment was subsequently assigned to the 4th Marine Division for service in World War II. Initially located at Marine Corps Base Camp Pendleton, California, the regiment was ordered to the Pacific Theater in January 1944 and participated in the Battle of Kwajalein, Saipan, Battle of Tinian and the Battle of Iwo Jima.

D-day Iwo found 1/25 the assault Battalion on blue 1, 3/25 was the assault battalion on blue 2 and 2/25 was the reserve for blue beaches. Transports to target were: USS Napa - 1/25; USS Pickens - 2/25; and USS Sanborn-3/25. The regiment won two Presidential Unit Citations for its participation in these battles. The 25th Marines returned to Camp Pendleton at the end of the war and on 10 November 1945 the regiment was deactivated.

On 1 July 1962, 16 ½ years after its colors had been folded following its service in World War II, the 4th Marine Division was reactivated as a reserve division. This reactivation included all three battalions of the 25th Marines. Reserve Marines of the regiment have served alongside their regular counterparts in training exercises throughout the world.

In February 1991 the entire regiment was activated for Operation Desert Storm. Although, only 1st Battalion deployed into Southwest Asia and participated in the 1st Marine Division's initial breach of Iraqi defenses, the regimental headquarters, 2nd and 3rd Battalions mobilized in support of other operational requirements.

In January 2002 the regimental headquarters Company and 2nd Battalion, 25th Marines moved to Camp Lejeune, North Carolina in support of Operation Enduring Freedom and Operation Noble Eagle. Subsequently, Headquarters Company and 2nd Battalion, 25th Marines were deactivated in January 2003. Since 2003 the regiment has routinely deployed infantry battalions, advisor teams, and Military Transition Teams to Iraq, Afghanistan, and the Horn of Africa in support of the Global War on Terror. Concurrently, the regiment actively participates in numerous bilateral and multilateral theater engagement operations throughout the globe.

== Regimental Commanders ==
- Colonel Richard H. Schubert (1 May 1943 – 27 July 1943)
- Colonel Samuel C. Cumming (28 July 1943 – 10 April 1944)
- Colonel Merton J. Batchelder (11 April 1944 – 31 October 1944)
- Colonel John R. Lanigan (1 November 1944 - October 1945)
- Colonel William W. Davies (October 1945 – 10 November 1945)

== Notable former members ==
- Drew Carey, game show host, actor, comedian and Seattle Sounders FC part owner.
- Harry O'Neill, served in Weapons Company during World War II
- Wilbur F. Simlik, served with Company L, 3rd Battalion on Iwo Jima; later Major General, USMC
- Mayor Jondavid R. Longo, served with Company K, 3rd Battalion in Operation Enduring Freedom in Afghanistan

== See also ==
- List of United States Marine Corps regiments
- Organization of the United States Marine Corps
