= December 28 =

December 28 this year in various calendars
- Monday, 28 December 2026
Akan	Kurudwo
Armenian	11 Arach 1476
Aztec	Huei Tozoztli 7, 2 Xōchitl
Babylonian	18 Kislimu, 2337 SE
Balinese pawukon	Menga, Pasah, Laba, Wage, Paniron, Coma of Julungwangi, Indra, Dangu, Dewa
Bengali	13 Poush, BS 1433
Chinese	Yang Fire Rat・Net Mansion; Fire Horse Year, Month 11, Day 20 (Dongzhi, 8 days until Xiaohan)
Common Era	28 December 2026 CE
Coptic	19 Koiak, AM 1743
Egyptian	16 Pachon, 2775 NE
Ethiopian	19 Tākḫśāś, 2019 Amätä Məhrät
French Republican	Décade I, Septidi de Nivôse de l'Année 235 de la République
Gregorian	28 December, AD 2026
Hebrew	18 Tevet, AM 5787
Hindu	Maghā・Viṣkambha; Solar: 13 Pauṣa, 1948 SE; Lunisolar: Pañcamī, Kṛishna pakṣa of Mārgaśīrṣa, 2083 VE; Rāudra・5127 KY・1,872,937
Icelandic	Mánudagur, 6 Mörsugur 2026
Islamic	18 Rajab, AH 1448 (using tabular method)
ISO week date	2026-W53-1
Japanese	20 Shimotsuki, Reiwa 8 (Tōji, 8 days until Shōkan)
Julian	15 December, AD 2026 (AM 7535)
Julian day	2461403
Korean	20 Jwidal, 4359 DE
Maya	13.0.14.4.0; 13 Kankin, 2 Ahau
Roman	ante diem XVIII Kalendas Ianuarias, MMDCCLXXX AUC
Solar Hijri	7 Dey, SH 1405
Tibetan	20 mgo, me pho rta 2153 or 1772 or 1000

<<	December					>>
Su	Mo	Tu	We	Th	Fr	Sa
		1	2	3	4	5
6	7	8	9	10	11	12
13	14	15	16	17	18	19
20	21	22	23	24	25	26
27	28	29	30	31
2026

December 28 in recent years
2025 (Sunday)
2024 (Saturday)
2023 (Thursday)
2022 (Wednesday)
2021 (Tuesday)
2020 (Monday)
2019 (Saturday)
2018 (Friday)
2017 (Thursday)
2016 (Wednesday)

December 28 is the 362nd day of the year (363rd in leap years) in the Gregorian calendar; three days remain until the end of the year.

== Events ==
=== Pre-1600 ===
- 418 – A papal election begins, resulting in the election of Pope Boniface I.
- 457 – Majorian is acclaimed as Western Roman emperor.
- 484 – Alaric II succeeds his father Euric and becomes king of the Visigoths. He establishes his capital at Aire-sur-l'Adour (Southern Gaul).
- 893 – An earthquake destroys the city of Dvin, Armenia.
- 1065 – Edward the Confessor's Romanesque monastic church at Westminster Abbey is consecrated.
- 1308 – The reign of Emperor Hanazono of Japan begins.

=== 1601–1900 ===
- 1659 – The Marathas defeat the Adilshahi forces in the Battle of Kolhapur.
- 1688 – William III of Orange enters London with a Dutch army during the 1688 invasion of England.
- 1768 – King Taksin's coronation achieved through conquest as a king of Thailand and established Thonburi as a capital.
- 1795 – Construction of Yonge Street, formerly recognized as the longest street in the world, begins in York, Upper Canada (present-day Toronto).
- 1832 – John C. Calhoun becomes the first Vice President of the United States to resign. He resigned after being elected Senator from South Carolina.
- 1835 – Osceola leads his Seminole warriors in Florida into the Second Seminole War against the United States Army.
- 1836 – South Australia and Adelaide are founded.
- 1836 – Spain recognizes the independence of Mexico with the signing of the Santa María–Calatrava Treaty.
- 1846 – Iowa is admitted as the 29th U.S. state.
- 1879 – Tay Bridge disaster: The central part of the Tay Rail Bridge in Dundee, Scotland, United Kingdom collapses as a train passes over it, killing 75.
- 1885 – The Indian National Congress is founded in Bombay Presidency, British India.
- 1895 – The Lumière brothers perform for their first paying audience at the Grand Cafe in Boulevard des Capucines.
- 1895 – Wilhelm Röntgen publishes a paper detailing his discovery of a new type of radiation, which later will be known as x-rays.

=== 1901–present ===
- 1902 – The Syracuse Athletic Club defeat the New York Philadelphians, 5–0, in the first indoor professional football game, which was held at Madison Square Garden.
- 1908 – The 7.1 M_{w} Messina earthquake shakes Southern Italy with a maximum Mercalli intensity of XI (Extreme), killing between about 80,000.
- 1912 – The first municipally owned streetcars take to the streets in San Francisco.
- 1918 – Constance Markievicz, while detained in Holloway prison, becomes the first woman to be elected Member of Parliament (MP) to the British House of Commons.
- 1941 – World War II: Operation Anthropoid, the plot to assassinate high-ranking Nazi officer Reinhard Heydrich, commences.
- 1943 – Soviet authorities launch Operation Ulussy, beginning the deportation of the Kalmyk nation to Siberia and Central Asia.
- 1943 – World War II: After eight days of brutal house-to-house fighting, the Battle of Ortona concludes with the victory of the 1st Canadian Infantry Division over the German 1st Parachute Division and the capture of the Italian town of Ortona.
- 1944 – Maurice Richard becomes the first player to score eight points in one game of NHL ice hockey.
- 1948 – The DC-3 airliner NC16002 disappears 80 kilometres (50 mi) south of Miami.
- 1956 – Chin Peng, David Marshall and Tunku Abdul Rahman meet in Baling, Malaya to try to resolve the Malayan Emergency situation.
- 1958 – "Greatest Game Ever Played": The Baltimore Colts defeat the New York Giants in the first ever National Football League sudden death overtime game at New York's Yankee Stadium to win the NFL Championship.
- 1967 – American businesswoman Muriel Siebert becomes the first woman to own a seat on the New York Stock Exchange.
- 1972 – The last scheduled day for induction into the military by the Selective Service System. Due to the fact that President Richard Nixon declared this day a national day of mourning due to former President Harry S Truman's death, approximately 300 men were not able to report due to most Federal offices being closed. Since the draft was not resumed in 1973, they were never drafted.
- 1973 – The United States Endangered Species Act is signed into law by President Richard Nixon.
- 1978 – United Airlines Flight 173 crashes in a residential neighborhood near Portland International Airport, killing 10 people.
- 1989 – A magnitude 5.6 earthquake hits Newcastle, New South Wales, Australia, killing 13 people.
- 2006 – War in Somalia: The militaries of Somalia's Transitional Federal Government and Ethiopian troops capture Mogadishu unopposed.
- 2009 – Forty-three people die in a suicide bombing in Karachi, Pakistan, where Shia Muslims are observing the Day of Ashura.
- 2014 – Indonesia AirAsia Flight 8501 crashes into the Karimata Strait en route from Surabaya to Singapore, killing all 162 people aboard.
- 2014 – Nine people die and another 19 are reported missing, when the MS Norman Atlantic catches fire in the Strait of Otranto, in the Adriatic Sea, in Italian waters.
- 2019 – A truck bomb is detonated in Mogadishu, Somalia, killing at least 85 people and injuring over 140 more. The militant group Al-Shabaab claims responsibility.
- 2025 – Unrest in the form of mass protests erupt across Iran, the largest uprising in the country since the Iranian Revolution.

== Births ==
=== Pre-1600 ===
- 1461 – Louise of Savoy, French nun (died 1503)
- 1510 – Nicholas Bacon, English politician (died 1579)
- 1535 – Martin Eisengrein, German theologian (died 1578)

=== 1601–1900 ===
- 1619 – Antoine Furetière, French author and scholar (died 1688)
- 1635 – Elizabeth Stuart, second daughter of King Charles I of England (died 1650)
- 1651 – Johann Krieger, German organist and composer (died 1735)
- 1655 – Charles Cornwallis, 3rd Baron Cornwallis, English politician, Lord Lieutenant of Suffolk (died 1698)
- 1665 – George FitzRoy, 1st Duke of Northumberland, English general and politician, Lord Lieutenant of Berkshire (died 1716)
- 1722 – Eliza Lucas, Caribbean-American agriculturalist (died 1793)
- 1724 – Christoph Franz von Buseck, Prince-Bishop of Bamberg (died 1805)
- 1763 – John Molson, English-Canadian brewer, founded the Molson Brewery (died 1836)
- 1775 – Jean-Gabriel Eynard, Swiss banker and photographer (died 1863)
- 1789 – Catharine Maria Sedgwick, American novelist of "domestic fiction" (died 1867)
- 1798 – Thomas Henderson, Scottish astronomer and mathematician (died 1844)
- 1818 – Carl Remigius Fresenius, German chemist and academic (died 1897)
- 1842 – Calixa Lavallée, Canadian-American lieutenant and composer (died 1891)
- 1856 – Woodrow Wilson, American historian and politician, 28th President of the United States, Nobel Prize laureate (died 1924)
- 1865 – Félix Vallotton, Swiss/French painter (died 1925)
- 1869 – Kathleen O'Melia, Canadian religious sister (died 1939)
- 1870 – Charles Bennett, English runner (died 1949)
- 1882 – Arthur Eddington, English astronomer, physicist, and mathematician (died 1944)
- 1882 – Lili Elbe, Danish model and painter (died 1931)
- 1887 – Werner Kolhörster, German physicist and academic (died 1946)
- 1888 – F. W. Murnau, German-American director, producer, and screenwriter (died 1931)
- 1890 – Quincy Wright, American political scientist, historian, and academic (died 1970)
- 1894 – Burnita Shelton Matthews, American judge (died 1988)
- 1895 – Carol Ryrie Brink, American author and playwright (died 1981)
- 1898 – Carl-Gustaf Rossby, Swedish-American meteorologist and academic (died 1957)
- 1898 – Shigematsu Sakaibara, Japanese admiral (died 1947)
- 1900 – Ted Lyons, American baseball player (died 1986)

=== 1901–present ===
- 1902 – Mortimer J. Adler, American philosopher and author (died 2001)
- 1902 – Shen Congwen, Chinese author and educator (died 1988)
- 1903 – Earl Hines, American pianist and bandleader (died 1983)
- 1903 – John von Neumann, Hungarian-American mathematician and physicist (died 1957)
- 1907 – Ze'ev Ben-Haim, Ukrainian-Israeli linguist and academic (died 2013)
- 1908 – Lew Ayres, American actor (died 1996)
- 1910 – Billy Williams, American singer (died 1972)
- 1911 – Wil van Beveren, Dutch sprinter and journalist (died 2003)
- 1913 – Lou Jacobi, Canadian-American actor (died 2009)
- 1914 – Bidia Dandaron, Russian author and educator (died 1974)
- 1914 – Pops Staples, American singer-songwriter and guitarist (died 2000)
- 1917 – Ellis Clarke, Trinidadian politician, 1st President of Trinidad and Tobago (died 2010)
- 1919 – Emily Cheney Neville, American author (died 1997)
- 1920 – Tufty Mann, South African cricketer (died 1952)
- 1920 – Bruce McCarty, American architect, designed the Knoxville City-County Building (died 2013)
- 1920 – Steve Van Buren, Honduran-American football player (died 2012)
- 1920 – Al Wistert, American football player and coach (died 2016)
- 1921 – Johnny Otis, American singer-songwriter and producer (died 2012)
- 1922 – Lionel Bowen, Australian politician, 6th Deputy Prime Minister of Australia (died 2012)
- 1922 – Stan Lee, American publisher, producer, and actor (died 2018)
- 1924 – Girma Wolde-Giorgis, Ethiopian politician; President of Ethiopia (died 2018)
- 1925 – Hildegard Knef, German actress and singer (died 2002)
- 1925 – Milton Obote, Ugandan engineer and politician, 2nd President of Uganda (died 2005)
- 1926 – Donald Carr, German-English cricketer and referee (died 2016)
- 1928 – Moe Koffman, Canadian flute player, saxophonist, and composer (died 2001)
- 1928 – John William Thomson, Canadian politician (died 2025)
- 1929 – Brian Redhead, English journalist and author (died 1994)
- 1929 – Terry Sawchuk, Canadian-American ice hockey player (died 1970)
- 1929 – Maarten Schmidt, Dutch astronomer (died 2022)
- 1930 – Mariam A. Aleem, Egyptian illustrator and academic (died 2010)
- 1931 – Guy Debord, French theorist and author (died 1994)
- 1931 – Martin Milner, American actor (died 2015)
- 1932 – Dhirubhai Ambani, Indian businessman, founded Reliance Industries (died 2002)
- 1932 – Dorsey Burnette, American singer-songwriter (died 1979)
- 1932 – Roy Hattersley, English journalist and politician, Shadow Home Secretary (died 2026)
- 1932 – Harry Howell, Canadian ice hockey player and coach (died 2019)
- 1932 – Nichelle Nichols, American actress (died 2022)
- 1932 – Manuel Puig, Argentine author and playwright (died 1990)
- 1933 – John Y. Brown Jr., American soldier, lawyer, and politician, 55th Governor of Kentucky (died 2022)
- 1934 – Rudi Faßnacht, German footballer and manager (died 2000)
- 1934 – Maggie Smith, English actress (died 2024)
- 1936 – Alan Coleman, English-Australian director, producer, and screenwriter (died 2013)
- 1936 – Lawrence Schiller, American journalist, director, and producer
- 1937 – Ratan Tata, Indian businessman and philanthropist (died 2024)
- 1938 – Dick Sudhalter, American trumpet player, scholar, and critic (died 2008)
- 1939 – Philip Anschutz, American businessman, founded Anschutz Entertainment Group
- 1939 – Frank McLintock, Scottish footballer and manager
- 1939 – Michelle Urry, American journalist and illustrator (died 2006)
- 1940 – A. K. Antony, Indian lawyer and politician, Indian Minister of Defence
- 1940 – Don Francisco, Chilean-American journalist and talk show host
- 1941 – Intikhab Alam, Indian-Pakistani cricketer and coach
- 1942 – Roger Swerts, Belgian cyclist
- 1943 – Juan Luis Cipriani Thorne, Peruvian cardinal
- 1943 – David Peterson, Canadian lawyer and politician, 20th Premier of Ontario
- 1943 – Joan Ruddock, Welsh politician
- 1944 – Sandra Faber, American astronomer and academic
- 1944 – Johnny Isakson, American sergeant and politician (died 2021)
- 1944 – Kary Mullis, American biochemist and academic, Nobel Prize laureate (died 2019)
- 1944 – Gordon Taylor, English footballer
- 1945 – Birendra, King of Nepal (died 2001)
- 1945 – Max Hastings, English journalist, historian, and author
- 1946 – Mike Beebe, American lawyer and politician, 45th Governor of Arkansas
- 1946 – Pierre Falardeau, Canadian director, screenwriter, and activist (died 2009)
- 1946 – Hubert Green, American golfer (died 2018)
- 1946 – Tim Johnson, American lawyer and politician (died 2024)
- 1946 – Barbara, Lady Judge, American-English lawyer and businesswoman (died 2020)
- 1946 – Bill Lee, American baseball player and author
- 1946 – Laffit Pincay Jr., Panamanian jockey
- 1946 – Edgar Winter, American singer-songwriter, keyboard player, and producer
- 1947 – Dick Diamonde, Dutch-Australian rock bass player (died 2024)
- 1947 – Aurelio Rodríguez, Mexican baseball player, coach, and manager (died 2000)
- 1948 – Ziggy Modeliste, American drummer
- 1950 – Alex Chilton, American singer-songwriter and guitarist (died 2010)
- 1950 – Clifford Cocks, English mathematician and cryptographer
- 1950 – Rainer Maria Latzke, German-American painter and academic
- 1952 – Arun Jaitley, Indian lawyer and politician, 9th Indian Minister of Law and Justice (died 2019)
- 1952 – Bridget Prentice, Scottish educator and politician
- 1953 – Richard Clayderman, French pianist
- 1953 – Tatsumi Fujinami, Japanese wrestler and promoter, founded Dradition wrestling promotion
- 1953 – Charlie Pierce, American journalist and author
- 1953 – Martha Wash, American singer-songwriter
- 1954 – Tony Ables, American serial killer
- 1954 – Gayle King, American television journalist
- 1954 – Denzel Washington, American actor, director, and producer
- 1955 – Stephen Frost, English comedian, actor, and screenwriter
- 1955 – Liu Xiaobo, Chinese author, academic, and activist, Nobel Prize laureate (died 2017)
- 1956 – Nigel Kennedy, English violinist
- 1958 – Terry Butcher, English footballer and manager
- 1958 – Curt Byrum, American golfer
- 1958 – Zoran Gajić, Serbian volleyball trainer
- 1959 – Hansjörg Kunze, German runner and sportscaster
- 1959 – Daniel Léo Simpson, American composer
- 1959 – Ana Torroja, Spanish singer-songwriter
- 1960 – Ray Bourque, Canadian ice hockey player
- 1960 – John Fitzgerald, Australian tennis player, coach, and sportscaster
- 1960 – Chad McQueen, American actor and race car driver (died 2024)
- 1960 – Melvin Turpin, American basketball player (died 2010)
- 1961 – Kent Nielsen, Danish footballer and manager
- 1962 – Michel Petrucciani, French jazz pianist (died 1999)
- 1964 – Tex Perkins, Australian singer-songwriter
- 1964 – Maite Zúñiga, Spanish runner
- 1965 – Allar Levandi, Estonian skier
- 1967 – Chris Ware, American illustrator
- 1968 – Akihiko Hoshide, Japanese engineer and astronaut
- 1969 – Linus Torvalds, Finnish-American computer programmer, developed Linux kernel
- 1970 – Elaine Hendrix, American actress
- 1970 – James Jett, American sprinter and football player
- 1970 – Brenda Schultz-McCarthy, Dutch tennis player
- 1971 – Benny Agbayani, American baseball player
- 1971 – Sergi Barjuán, Spanish footballer and manager
- 1971 – Anita Doth, Dutch singer-songwriter
- 1971 – William Gates, American basketball player
- 1972 – Roberto Palacios, Peruvian footballer
- 1972 – Patrick Rafter, Australian-Bermudian tennis player and model
- 1972 – Adam Vinatieri, American football player
- 1973 – Holger Blume, German sprinter
- 1973 – Marc Blume, German sprinter
- 1973 – Seth Meyers, American actor, producer, screenwriter, and talk show host
- 1973 – Ids Postma, Dutch speed skater
- 1974 – Jocelyn Enriquez, American singer
- 1974 – Rob Niedermayer, Canadian ice hockey player
- 1974 – Markus Weinzierl, German footballer and manager
- 1975 – B. J. Ryan, American baseball player
- 1976 – Brendan Hines, American actor and singer
- 1976 – Joe Manganiello, American actor
- 1976 – Trond Nymark, Norwegian race walker
- 1976 – Ben Tune, Australian rugby player
- 1976 – Igor Žiković, Croatian footballer
- 1976 – Deddy Corbuzier, Indonesian presenter and magician
- 1977 – Derrick Brew, American sprinter
- 1977 – Shane Elford, Australian rugby league player
- 1977 – Vanessa Ferlito, American actress
- 1977 – Seun Ogunkoya, Nigerian sprinter
- 1978 – Chris Coyne, Australian footballer and manager
- 1978 – John Legend, American singer-songwriter, pianist, and actor
- 1979 – James Blake, American tennis player
- 1979 – Senna Gammour, German singer-songwriter
- 1979 – Bill Hall, American baseball player
- 1979 – Zach Hill, American musician and artist
- 1979 – André Holland, American actor
- 1979 – Noomi Rapace, Swedish actress
- 1980 – Lomana LuaLua, Congolese footballer
- 1980 – Ryta Turava, Belarusian race walker
- 1981 – Khalid Boulahrouz, Dutch footballer
- 1981 – Elizabeth Jordan Carr, American journalist
- 1981 – Sienna Miller, American-British actress and fashion designer
- 1981 – David Moss, American ice hockey player
- 1981 – Narsha, South Korean singer and dancer
- 1981 – Frank Turner, English singer-songwriter and guitarist
- 1981 – Mika Väyrynen, Finnish footballer
- 1982 – Cedric Benson, American football player (died 2019)
- 1982 – Beau Garrett, American actress and model
- 1982 – François Gourmet, Belgian decathlete
- 1982 – Curtis Glencross, Canadian hockey player
- 1984 – Martin Kaymer, German golfer
- 1984 – Duane Solomon, American runner
- 1986 – Tom Huddlestone, English footballer
- 1987 – Thomas Dekker, American actor and musician
- 1989 – Austin Barnes, American baseball player
- 1989 – Mackenzie Rosman, American actress
- 1990 – Ayele Abshero, Ethiopian runner
- 1990 – Marcos Alonso, Spanish footballer
- 1990 – David Archuleta, American singer
- 1990 – John Henson, American basketball player
- 1990 – Bastiaan Lijesen, Dutch swimmer
- 1992 – Tomáš Jurčo, Slovak ice hockey player
- 1994 – Adam Peaty, English swimmer
- 1995 – Dylan Cease, American baseball player
- 1995 – Mauricio Lemos, Uruguayan footballer
- 1995 – Nahitan Nández, Uruguayan footballer
- 1996 – Tanguy Ndombele, French footballer
- 1999 – Iqbaal Ramadhan, Indonesian actor and singer
- 2001 – Maitreyi Ramakrishnan, Canadian actress
- 2002 – Tom Cannon, British-Irish footballer

== Deaths ==
=== Pre-1600 ===
- 925 – Wang Zongbi, general of the Chinese state of Former Shu
- 1218 – Robert II, Count of Dreux (born 1154)
- 1297 – Hugh Aycelin, French cardinal (born 1230)
- 1326 – Sir David II Strathbogie, Earl of Atholl, Constable of Scotland, and Chief Warden of Northumberland
- 1367 – Ashikaga Yoshiakira, Japanese shōgun (born 1330)
- 1394 – Maria Angelina Doukaina Palaiologina, queen of Epirus (born 1350)
- 1446 – Antipope Clement VIII (born 1369)
- 1491 – Bertoldo di Giovanni, Italian sculptor (born c. 1435)
- 1503 – Piero the Unfortunate, Italian ruler (born 1471)
- 1538 – Andrea Gritti, Doge of Venice (born 1455)
- 1547 – Konrad Peutinger, German humanist and antiquarian (born 1465)
- 1558 – Hermann Finck, German organist and composer (born 1527)

=== 1601–1900 ===
- 1622 – Francis de Sales, French bishop and saint (born 1567)
- 1663 – Francesco Maria Grimaldi, Italian mathematician and physicist (born 1618)
- 1671 – Johann Friedrich Gronovius, German scholar and critic (born 1611)
- 1694 – Mary II of England (born 1662)
- 1706 – Pierre Bayle, French philosopher and author (born 1647)
- 1708 – Joseph Pitton de Tournefort, French botanist and mycologist (born 1656)
- 1715 – William Carstares, Scottish minister and academic (born 1649)
- 1734 – Rob Roy MacGregor, Scottish outlaw (born 1671)
- 1736 – Antonio Caldara, Italian composer (born 1670)
- 1785 – Peter Ernst Wilde, Polish-Estonian physician and journalist (born 1732)
- 1795 – Eugenio Espejo, Ecuadorian physician and lawyer (born 1747)
- 1859 – Thomas Babington Macaulay, 1st Baron Macaulay, English historian and politician, Secretary at War (born 1800)
- 1872 – James Van Ness, American lawyer and politician, 7th Mayor of San Francisco (born 1808)
- 1890 – Dennis Miller Bunker, American painter (born 1861)
- 1897 – William Corby, American priest and academic (born 1833)
- 1900 – Alexandre de Serpa Pinto, Portuguese soldier and explorer (born 1846)

=== 1901–present ===
- 1907 – Louise Granberg, Swedish playwright (born 1812)
- 1913 – Ahmet Mithat Efendi, Turkish journalist and translator (born 1844)
- 1916 – Eduard Strauss, Austrian violinist and composer (born 1835)
- 1917 – Alfred Edwin McKay, Canadian captain and pilot (born 1892)
- 1918 – Olavo Bilac, Brazilian poet and journalist (born 1865)
- 1919 – Johannes Rydberg, Swedish physicist and academic (born 1854)
- 1924 – Léon Bakst, Russian painter and costume designer (born 1866)
- 1932 – Jack Blackham, Australian cricketer (born 1854)
- 1935 – Clarence Day, American author and illustrator (born 1874)
- 1937 – Maurice Ravel, French pianist and composer (born 1875)
- 1938 – Florence Lawrence, Canadian actress (born 1886)
- 1942 – Alfred Flatow, German gymnast (born 1869)
- 1943 – Steve Evans, American baseball player (born 1885)
- 1945 – Theodore Dreiser, American novelist and journalist (born 1871)
- 1946 – Elie Nadelman, Polish-American sculptor (born 1882)
- 1947 – Victor Emmanuel III of Italy (born 1869)
- 1949 – Jack Lovelock, New Zealand runner and soldier (born 1910)
- 1959 – Ante Pavelić, Croatian fascist dictator during World War II (born 1889)
- 1960 – Philippe Panneton, Canadian physician, academic, and diplomat (born 1895)
- 1963 – Paul Hindemith, German violist, composer, and conductor (born 1895)
- 1967 – Katharine McCormick, American biologist and philanthropist (born 1875)
- 1968 – David Ogilvy, 12th Earl of Airlie, Scottish peer, soldier and courtier (born 1893)
- 1971 – Max Steiner, Austrian-American pianist, composer, and conductor (born 1888)
- 1976 – Katharine Byron, American politician (born 1903)
- 1981 – Allan Dwan, Canadian-American director, producer, and screenwriter (born 1885)
- 1983 – Dennis Wilson, American drummer, songwriter, and producer (born 1944)
- 1984 – Sam Peckinpah, American director, producer, and screenwriter (born 1925)
- 1984 – Mary Stewart, Baroness Stewart of Alvechurch, British politician and educator (born 1903)
- 1984 – Peter Kihss, American journalist
- 1986 – John D. MacDonald, American colonel and author (born 1916)
- 1986 – Jan Nieuwenhuys, Dutch painter (born 1922)
- 1989 – Hermann Oberth, Romanian-German physicist and engineer (born 1894)
- 1990 – Warren Skaaren, American screenwriter and producer (born 1946)
- 1992 – Sal Maglie, American baseball player and coach (born 1917)
- 1993 – William L. Shirer, American journalist and historian (born 1904)
- 1994 – Jean-Louis Lévesque, Canadian businessman and philanthropist (born 1911)
- 1999 – Clayton Moore, American actor (born 1914)
- 2001 – Samuel Abraham Goldblith, American lieutenant, biologist, and engineer (born 1919)
- 2001 – William X. Kienzle, American priest and author (born 1928)
- 2003 – Benjamin Thurman Hacker, American admiral (born 1935)
- 2004 – Jerry Orbach, American actor and singer (born 1935)
- 2004 – Susan Sontag, American novelist, essayist, critic, and playwright (born 1933)
- 2006 – Jamal Karimi-Rad, Iranian politician, Iranian Minister of Justice (born 1956)
- 2008 – Irene Lieblich, Polish-American painter and illustrator (born 1923)
- 2009 – Jimmy Sullivan, American musician, composer and songwriter. Known by his stage name The Rev (born 1981)
- 2010 – Billy Taylor, American pianist and composer (born 1921)
- 2010 – Terry Peder Rasmussen, American serial killer (born 1943)
- 2012 – Nicholas Ambraseys, Greek-English seismologist and engineer (born 1929)
- 2012 – Mark Crispin, American computer scientist and academic, designed the IMAP (born 1956)
- 2012 – Václav Drobný, Czech footballer (born 1980)
- 2012 – Frankie Walsh, Irish hurler and manager (born 1936)
- 2013 – Halton Arp, American-German astronomer and critic (born 1927)
- 2013 – Esther Borja, Cuban soprano and actress (born 1913)
- 2013 – Andrew Jacobs, Jr., American soldier, lawyer, and politician (born 1932)
- 2013 – Alfred Marshall, American businessman, founded Marshalls (born 1919)
- 2013 – Joseph Ruskin, American actor and producer (born 1924)
- 2013 – Ilya Tsymbalar, Ukrainian-Russian footballer and manager (born 1969)
- 2014 – Leelah Alcorn, American transgender teenager (born 1997)
- 2014 – Vahan Hovhannisyan, Armenian politician (born 1956)
- 2014 – Frankie Randall, American singer-songwriter (born 1938)
- 2015 – John Bradbury, English drummer and songwriter (born 1953)
- 2015 – Eloy Inos, Mariana Islander businessman and politician, 8th Governor of the Northern Mariana Islands (born 1949)
- 2015 – Lemmy, English musician, singer, and songwriter (born 1945)
- 2016 – Debbie Reynolds, American actress, singer and dancer (born 1932)
- 2016 – Jean-Christophe Victor, French political scientist (born 1947)
- 2017 – Rose Marie, American actress and comedienne (born 1923)
- 2021 – Grichka Bogdanoff, French television presenter and scientific essayist (born 1949)
- 2021 – John Madden, American football Hall of Fame coach and commentator (born 1936)
- 2021 – Harry Reid, American lawyer, politician, and former Senate majority leader (born 1939)
- 2022 – Philomena Franz, German Romani author (born 1922)
- 2023 – Vijayakanth, Indian actor and politician (born 1952)
- 2024 – Charles Dolan, American businessman, founded Cablevision and HBO (born 1926)
- 2025 – Brigitte Bardot, French actress, singer and activist (born 1934)

== Holidays and observances ==
- Christian feast day:
  - Abel (Coptic Church)
  - Caterina Volpicelli
  - Feast of the Holy Innocents or Childermas; in Spain and Latin American countries the festival is celebrated with pranks (inocentadas), similar to April Fools' Day (Catholic Church, Church of England, Lutheran Church), and its related observances:
    - Els Enfarinats (Ibi, Spain)
  - Simon the Athonite
  - December 28 (Eastern Orthodox liturgics)
- King Taksin Memorial Day (Thailand)
- Proclamation Day (South Australia), celebration started on the day following Christmas (South Australia)
- Republic Day (South Sudan)
- The fourth of the Twelve Days of Christmas (Western Christianity)
