= List of riots in Pakistan =

The territory of what has been independent Pakistan since August 1947 has faced a number of riots both before and after its independence. Here is a list of riots in Pakistan :

== Pre 2000 riots ==
Name	Year	Locations	Cause	Factions	Deaths	Wounded	Damage	Ref
Peshawar riots	March 21–24, 1910	Peshawar, Peshawar District, North-West Frontier Province	Annual Hindu festival of Holi coincided with Barawafat, the annual Muslim day of mourning.	Hindus; Muslims	At least 4 Muslims and 6 Hindus	Hundreds	At least 451 shops and homes, Rs. 5 million worth of damage	
1972 Language violence in Sindh	1972 (7 July)	Karachi	Language Dispute	Sindhi	47	Unknown	N/A	
1974 Anti-Ahmadiyya riots	May 1974	Islamabad, Peshawar, Hafizabad, Gujranwala, Lala Musa, Jhang, Wah Cantt, Burewala, and other localities	Religious violence	Muslims	27 Ahmadiya murdered	N/A	N/A	
1953 Lahore riots	1 February - 14 May 1953			N/A	N/A	N/A		
Riots in Kohat	1924	Kohat	Hindu–Muslim tension	Hindus	155	Unknown	Rs. 9 lakhs + of damage	

== Post 2000 ==
Name	Year	Locations	Cause	Factions	Deaths	Wounded	Damage	Ref
12 May Karachi riots	12 May 2007	Karachi	Ethnic Clashes	Muhajir	58	Many	Several cars and towns	
2007 Pakistan riots	2007	Sindh	Death of Benazir Bhutto - Anti Musharraf riots	Musharraf	47		Several cars burned	
2010 Karachi riots	3 August 2014	Karachi	Ethnic issues	MQM	90+	300+		
2019 Ghotki riots	2019	Ghotki	Alleged derogatory remarks made against Prophet Muhammed, found to be politically motivated	Muslims				
2021 Pakistani protests	11–20 April 2021	Countrywide	Blasphemy	Muslims		27+		
2023 Pakistani protests	14 March – 28 May							
May 9 riots	9 May 2023	countrywide	Political Issues	PTI workers		5+		
Alpuri Riots 2024	9 February - 2024	Alpuri, District Shangla	Political Issues	Police	4	Dozens	Police station, a govt school damaged and a car torched by protestors	
