= Karachi riots =

Karachi riots may refer to:

- 12 May Karachi riots, in 2007
- 2010 Karachi riots
