= Cave Hill, Barbados =

Cave Hill can refer to:

- Cave Hill, Saint Lucy, Barbados, a populated place
- Cave Hill, Saint Michael, Barbados, a suburban area, home to a campus of University of the West Indies
