= VP-24 =

Patrol Squadron 24
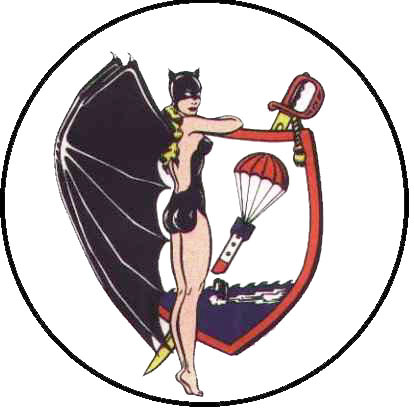
- VP-24
- Active: 10 April 1943 – 30 April 1995
- Country: United States of America
- Branch: United States Navy
- Type: Squadron
- Role: Maritime patrol
- Part of: Inactive
- Nicknames: Batmen; The Buccaneers; Screaming 104
- Engagements: World War II
- Decorations: PUC 15 August 1943 – 19 March 1944, 6 Nov 1944-7 June 1945

Aircraft flown
- Patrol: PB4Y-1 Liberator; PB4Y-2 Privateer; P-2 Neptune; P-3B/C Orion

Patrol Squadron 24 (VP-24) was a Patrol Squadron of the U.S. Navy. The squadron was established as Bombing Squadron One Hundred Four (VB-104) on 10 April 1943, redesignated as Patrol Bombing Squadron One Hundred Four (VPB-104) on 1 October 1944, redesignated as Patrol Squadron One Hundred Four (VP-104) on 15 May 1946, redesignated Heavy Patrol Squadron (Landplane) Four (VP-HL-4) on 15 November 1946, redesignated Patrol Squadron Twenty Four (VP-24) on 1 September 1948, the third squadron to be assigned the VP-24 designation, redesignated Attack Mining Squadron Thirteen (VA-HM-13) on 1 July 1956, redesignated Patrol Squadron Twenty Four (VP-24) on 1 July 1959 and disestablished 30 April 1995.

== Operational history ==
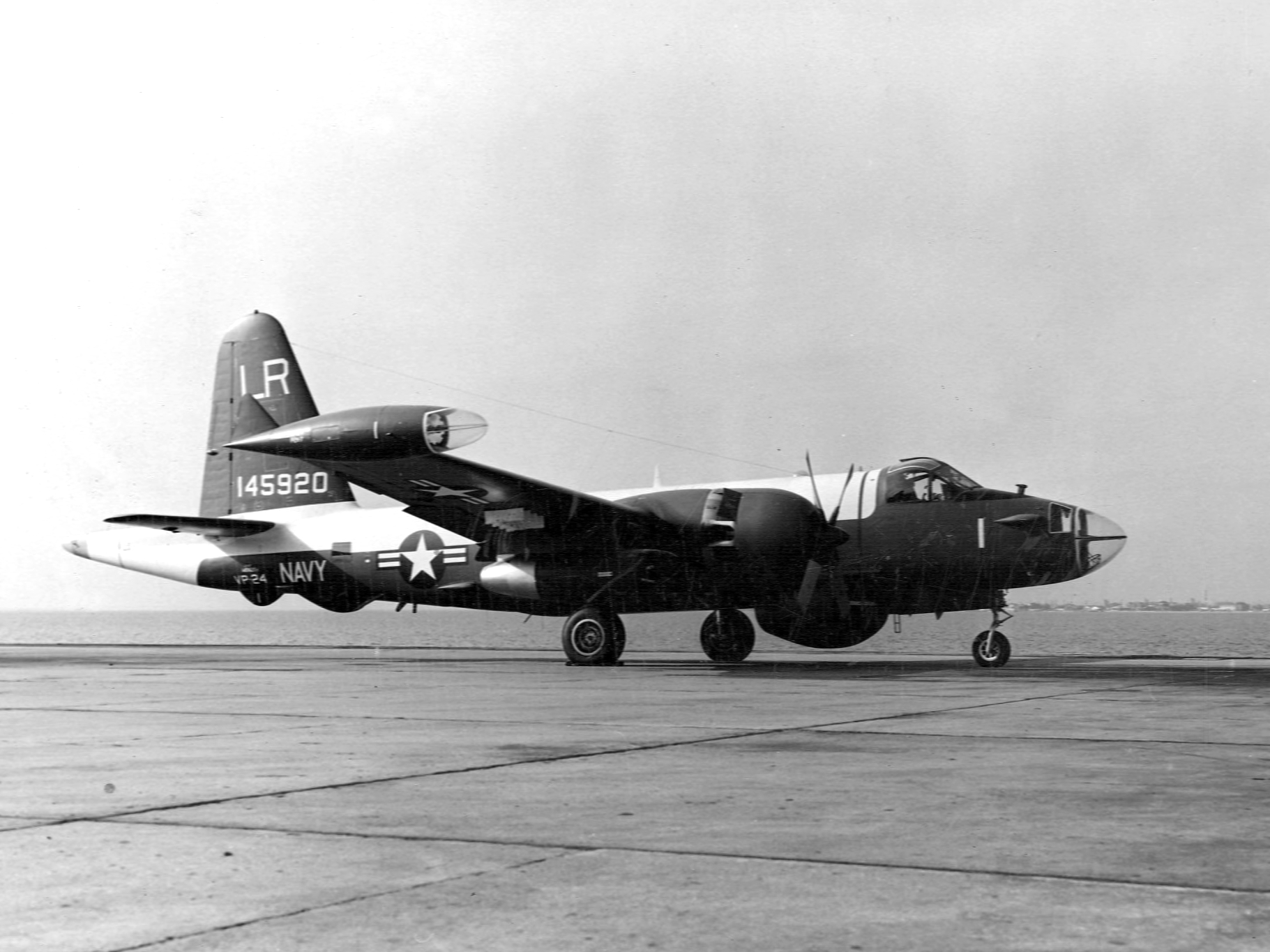
VP-24 P-2V-7S c.1962

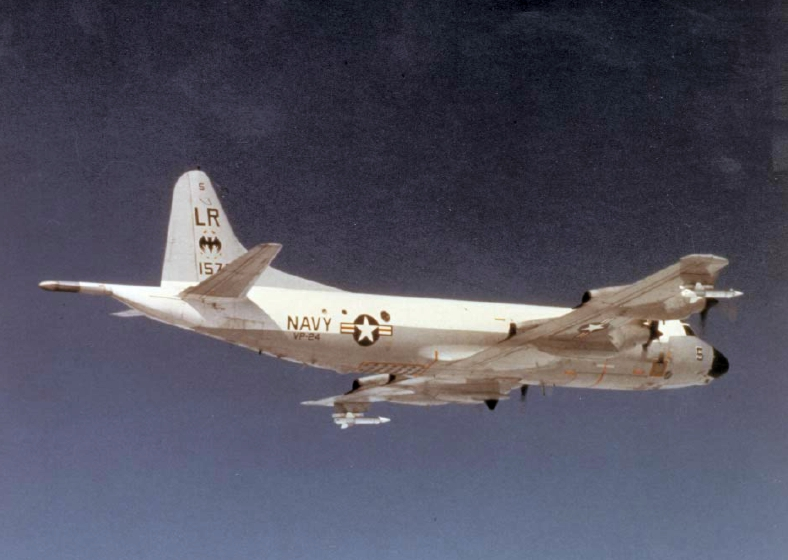
VP-24 P-3C with AGM-12 Bullpup missiles in the 1970s

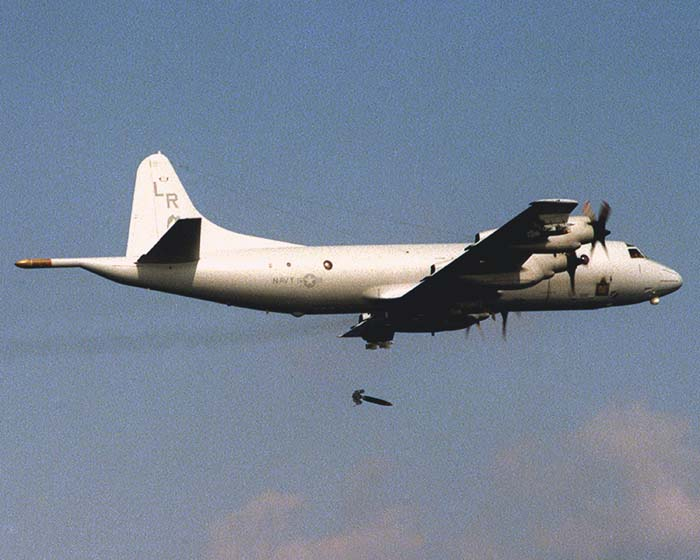
VP-24 P-3C drops a Snakeye retarded bomb

=== World War II ===
- 10 April 1943: VB-104 was established at Naval Air Station Kaneohe Bay, Hawaii. The squadron was formed with a cadre of personnel from VP-71 and equipped with the PB4Y-1 Liberator. The squadron came under the operational control of Fleet Air Wing TWO (FAW-2). Daily patrols were commenced immediately after formation, covering the approaches to Midway, Johnston Island and Canton Island. It was mid-July before the squadron attained its full complement of aircraft and personnel.
- 15 August 1943: Training at Kaneohe was completed and orders were received to proceed to Carney Field, Guadalcanal, under the operational control of Fleet Air Wing ONE (FAW-1), replacing VB-101. When the squadron arrived the aircrews commenced daily search missions, formation missions against enemy land targets, and photoreconnaissance and Dumbo (air-sea rescue) missions.
- 26 August 1943: Commander Harry E. Sears, squadron commanding officer, led an eight-aircraft strike on a Japanese destroyer task force attempting to evacuate personnel from Rekata Bay, Santa Isabel Island. The attack, made at sunset 90 miles off Buka Passage, disrupted the evacuation and left one of the destroyers heavily damaged.
- 2 September 1943: A squadron attack against enemy facilities at Kahili Airfield was led by Commander Sears on this date, joined by elements from several Army bomber squadrons. The airfield and parked enemy aircraft were heavily damaged with the squadron suffering only minor damage from heavy antiaircraft fire.
- 27 January 1944: Commander Harry E. Sears was awarded the Navy Cross for heroic actions while leading his squadron in combat during the period 26 August to 4 November 1943. In addition to leading several squadron attacks, he and his crew were credited, during separate actions, with the destruction of one enemy twin-engine bomber, damage to two enemy fighters, sinking one Japanese combination oiler and ammunition ship, damaging another oiler and damaging one enemy submarine.
- 6 Feb 1944: VB-104 was relocated from Guadalcanal to Munda Field, New Georgia. Operational tasking was essentially the same as that assigned while at Carney Field. The squadron was relieved by VB-115 on 29 March 1944, for return to the U.S. for rest and rehabilitation. The squadron record at this time was 30 enemy aircraft destroyed or damaged, 51 ships sunk or damaged, with 1,252 sorties in a seven-month tour.
- 15 May 1944: The squadron was reformed at NAAS Kearney Field, California, under the operational control of FAW-14. A small cadre was present on this date, while the majority of personnel were at Naval Air Station Hutchinson, Kansas, undergoing operational flight training on the PB4Y-1. The latter completed this phase of training and reported to NAAS Kearney Field on 21 June 1944.
- 28 July 1944: VB-104 began the trans-Pacific flight to NAS Kaneohe Bay, Hawaii. Upon arrival the squadron came under the operational control of FAW-2, and continued its combat patrol training over the waters encircling the Hawaiian Island chain. Anti-submarine warfare (ASW) training was introduced into the curriculum during this phase.
- 30 October 1944: VPB-104 departed Kaneohe for Morotai. The last squadron aircraft arrived on 3 November 1944, with operational control over the squadron exercised by Fleet Air Wing SEVENTEEN (FAW-17). Upon commencement of operations the squadron was assigned search and offensive reconnaissance patrols, strike missions on enemy shipping, night patrols and special tracking missions.
- 11 November 1944: Lieutenant Maurice Hill and his crew were attacked by enemy fighters while on patrol between Leyte and Cebu. Hill's crew was flying a PB4Y-1 equipped with a radar set in place of the customary belly turret. This lack of defensive armament was quickly noted by the Japanese fighter pilots, and the bomber was shot down near Pacijan Island. Filipino natives rescued the four survivors of the crash and tended their wounds until they could be rescued by a PT boat one week later. The villagers were later executed by the Japanese for giving assistance to the Americans.
- 1 December 1944: VPB-104 was relocated to the Army Air Forces' Tacloban Airfield, in the southern Philippines.
- 12 December 1944: Aviation Machinist Mate Third Class William E. Abbot was serving as first mechanic on a VPB-104 Liberator on patrol over northwest Borneo when the aircraft came under intense ground fire that penetrated the main bomb bay tank. AMM3C Abbot was able to transfer fuel from the leaking tank to the empty wing tanks, saving enough for the return flight to base. During the process, AMM3C Abbot was overcome by the high-octane fumes and fell to his death through the open bomb bay. He was posthumously awarded the Navy Cross.
- 26 December 1944: Lieutenant Paul F. Stevens earned a Navy Cross for his actions on the night of 26 December. While on patrol, Lieutenant Stevens spotted a Japanese task force en route to attack recently established U.S. bases on Mindoro, Philippines. His contact report gave the garrisons time to prepare for the attack and incoming shipping was diverted. After sending the report he attacked the largest ship in the group, believed to be a large cruiser or battleship, scoring two direct hits on the vessel. He remained in the vicinity tracking the progress of the task force, despite the heavy antiaircraft fire from the escorts.
- 2 March 1945: The squadron was relocated to Clark Field, Luzon, Philippines. When the squadron arrived the crews began operational night missions, daily search and reconnaissance patrols, and strikes on targets of opportunity—covering the China Coast to within 30 miles of Shanghai, the coastline of Amami Ōshima, Okinawa and Kitadaitōjima.
- 14 March 1945: Lieutenant Paul Stevens, squadron executive officer, intercepted and damaged Vice Admiral Yamagata's Kawanishi H8K2 flying boat) off the China Coast. The aircraft flew on for several miles and made a forced landing in an inlet on the coast where it immediately came under fire from Chinese partisans ashore. The admiral and his staff committed suicide and the crew set fire to the aircraft. Admiral Yamagata was en route to Tokyo for an interview with Emperor Hirohito prior to assuming the position of Undersecretary of the Imperial Japanese Navy. Intercepts of enemy radio messages had revealed the admiral's intended route, and Lieutenant Stevens was dispatched to intercept him.
- 18 October 1945: Operational patrols ceased in order to prepare the squadron for transfer back to the west coast of the continental U.S. The squadron's record for its second tour was 49 enemy aircraft destroyed, 254 vessels sunk and 12,500 flight hours completed. The squadron departed by sections on 26 October 1945, for NAS San Diego, California, then on to NAS Floyd Bennett Field, New York. VPB-104 was the only patrol squadron in World War II to receive two Presidential Unit Citations.

=== 1940s - 1960s ===
- 26 December 1945: The last squadron aircraft arrived at NAS Floyd Bennett Field, with the squadron coming under the operational control of Fleet Air Wing FIVE (FAW-5) effective 26 November 1945.
- 8 April 1946: VPB-104 was relocated to Naval Auxiliary Air Station Edenton, North Carolina, for training in ASW.
- 22 May 1946: The training syllabus was completed at Naval Auxillery Air Station Edenton and the squadron was transferred to Naval Air Station Atlantic City, New Jersey. Three crews were given SWOD training at Naval Auxiliary Air Station Chincoteague, Virginia, in September 1946 and April 1947. The ASM-N-2A Bat air-to-surface guided missile gave the squadron its nickname, the Batmen. The Bat was developed during World War II as a derivative from an earlier glide-bomb project, the Pelican. The Bat skipped several normal stages of development and went directly into combat. During the war it was carried by three squadrons, VPBs 109, 123 and 124. Only VPB-109 had any success with the missile, sinking three ships and destroying a large oil tank. The project languished briefly after the war until two squadrons were selected to be designated Bat squadrons: VP-24 in the Atlantic Fleet, and VP-25 in the Pacific.
- November 1947: VP-HL-4 received additional SWOD training during advanced base operations at Naval Station Argentia, Newfoundland.
- 29 December 1949: The squadron's mission was revised to make aerial mining its primary role and reduced Bat operations to a secondary role along with ASW, reconnaissance and anti-shipping.
- 22 October 1951: VP-24 deployed to RAF Luqa, Malta, as the first U.S. Navy squadron to ever operate from the base.
- 1 May 1954: VP-24 flew its last mission at NAS Argentia in the P4Y-2. It was the last squadron in Fleet Air Wing THREE (FAW-3) to fly the Privateer before receiving the P-2V Neptune and the last Atlantic Fleet Bat missile squadron. VP-24 ended its five-month deployment with more than 2,500 flight hours. Several of the squadron's remaining Bat missiles were expended in practice runs on icebergs.
- 31 March 1956: Two patrol squadrons were designated Petrel guided missile squadrons, operating P2V-6M aircraft. The Petrel was an air-to-surface guided missile designed for use by patrol aircraft against shipping. VP-24 was selected as the East Coast squadron, and VP-17 as the West Coast unit. VP-24 was the first to be fully equipped; VP-17 became operational in early 1957.
- November 1959: VP-24 received its first four P2V-7S aircraft. Final delivery of the last of 12 aircraft took place in March 1960.
- 5 November 1962: VP-24 was deployed to Leeward Point Field, Guantanamo Bay, Cuba during the Cuban Missile Crisis. The squadron flew continuous surveillance missions, reporting all Communist Bloc shipping transiting Cuban waters until relieved on 17 December 1962. VP-24 returned on 17 February 1963, conducting surveillance until relieved on 21 March 1963. During the second tour, the squadron photographed the removal from Cuba of intermediate range missiles and IL-28 Beagle bombers.
- 29 June 1965: VP-24 deployed to Naval Air Station Sigonella, Sicily, relieving VP-5. A detachment was maintained at NAF Souda Bay, Crete. While deployed to Souda Bay, the detachment was supported by USS Tallahatchie County.
- 5 July 1967: VP-24 was relocated from it home base at NAS Norfolk to Naval Air Station Patuxent River, Maryland. The squadron assumed duties at the new station with its new aircraft, the P-3B Orion. Transition training from the SP-2H Neptune to the P-3B began in April 1967 and was completed on 7 December 1967.
- 6 March 1968: VP-24 deployed to Naval Air Station Keflavik, Iceland, with a three-aircraft detachment at Lajes Field, Azores. The detachment was called to assist in the search for the missing submarine USS Scorpionfrom 28 May to 25 June 1968.
- 10 November 1969: After its return from deployment VP-24 commenced transition to the P-3C, becoming the third operational P-3C squadron. Transition training was completed on 9 March 1970.

=== 1970s through the 1990s ===
- 30 October 1972: The squadron changed home stations to Naval Air Station Jacksonville, Florida, where it fell under the operational control of Commander, Patrol Wing ELEVEN (COMPATWING 11).
- 1974: The squadron maintained 2-crew/2-aircraft "mini" detachments at Naval Air Station Bermuda from 1 to 12 April, 15 to 24 May, 3 to 14 June, 26 to 31 August and 1 to 5 September 1974; and to NAF Lajes, Azores, 10 to 15 October 1974. This type of deployment was being tested as an alternative to the full squadron and split deployments. Cmdr. Benjamin Thurman Hacker
- 12 September 1977: During the squadron's deployment to NAS Keflavik, Iceland, the squadron successfully tracked and located the hot-air balloon Double Eagle that had gone down at sea several hundred miles west of Iceland while attempting a crossing of the Atlantic. The squadron's efforts led to the rescue of the balloon's crew.
- May 1980: VP-24 was tasked with the first of many Cuban refugee surveillance flights, which continued periodically through late September 1980.
- 30 April 1995: VP-24 was disestablished at NAS Jacksonville as part of post-Cold War force reductions that reduced the number of active duty U.S. Navy patrol squadrons by 50%. The squadron's P-3C Update II.5 aircraft were redistributed to other patrol squadrons.

== Home port assignments ==
The squadron was assigned to these home ports, effective on the dates shown:

- Naval Air Station Kaneohe Bay, Hawaii 10 April 1943
- Naval Auxiliary Air Station Camp Kearney, California 15 May 1944
- Naval Air Station Kaneohe Bay, Hawaii 28 July 1944
- Naval Air Station Floyd Bennett Field, New York 26 December 1946
- Naval Air Station Atlantic City, New Jersey 22 May 1946
- Naval Air Station Patuxent River, Maryland 21 April 1948
- Naval Auxiliary Air Station Chincoteague, Maryland 1954
- Naval Air Station Norfolk, Virginia 15 February 1959
- Naval Air Station Patuxent River, Maryland 5 July 1967
- Naval Air Station Jacksonville, Florida 30 October 1972

== Aircraft assignment ==
The squadron first received the following aircraft on the dates shown:

- PB4Y-1 Liberator - April 1943
- PB4Y-2/P4Y-2 Privateer – February 1946
- P4Y-2B Privateer - November 1947
- P2V-5 Neptune – June 1954
- P2V-6M Neptune - March 1956
- P2V-5F Neptune - March 1957
- P2V-7S/SP-2H* Neptune - November 1959
- P-3B Orion – April 1967
- P-3C Orion – November 1969
- P-3C UIIIR Orion – 1991
- P-3C UII.5 Orion – 1993

- * Former USN/USMC aircraft designation system was changed to a joint DoD designation system in 1962, resulting in the P2V-7S being redesignated as the SP-2H.

== See also ==
- History of the United States Navy
- List of inactive United States Navy aircraft squadrons
- List of United States Navy aircraft squadrons
- List of squadrons in the Dictionary of American Naval Aviation Squadrons
