= Harry Sears =

Harry Sears may refer to:

- Harry E. Sears (admiral), U.S. Navy vice admiral
- Harry Edward Sears, American sports shooter
- Harry L. Sears, American lawyer and politician
