= United States Naval Facility, Barbados =

Coordinates: 13°18′16″N 59°38′57″W

Naval Facility Barbados also showing the Harrison Point Lighthouse.

Naval Facility (NAVFAC) Barbados, TWI, in commission 1957 to 1979, was the most southern of the Atlantic Sound Surveillance System (SOSUS) shore terminals. It had the distinction making the first system detection of a Soviet nuclear submarine in 1962 as that submarine was transiting off Norway. The facility was located adjacent to the Harrison Point Lighthouse, Parish of Saint Lucy.

Since decommissioning the remaining structures have been put to use by the government of Barbados.

== Naval Facility ==
Naval Facility Barbados was the southernmost of the original Atlantic Sound Surveillance System (SOSUS) shore terminals. The facility was commissioned on 1 October 1957, with a complement of about 12 officers and about 88 enlisted personnel. It was located adjacent to the Harrison Point Lighthouse in the Parish of Saint Lucy, Barbados, then part of the British colonial territory of the West Indies.

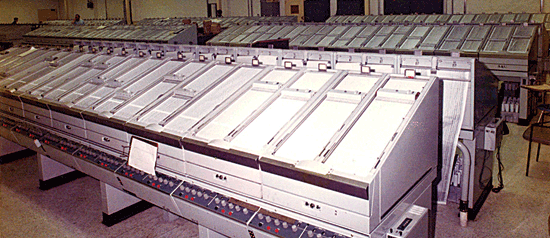
LOFARgram writers on watch floor.

The facility, in which output of the array at sea was processed and displayed by means of the Low Frequency Analyzer and Recorder (LOFAR), was commissioned about one month following the U.S. Navy Facility established in the island of Eleuthera in The Bahamas where the first operational array had been installed in 1952. A significant event in SOSUS history occurred on 6 July 1962 when NAVFAC Barbados made the first detection and identification of a Soviet nuclear submarine off the coast of Norway as it entered the Greenland-Iceland-United Kingdom (GIUK) gap.

The facility's commanding officer was enlisted by the Commanding Officer, Barbados Regiment during the regiment's 75th anniversary dinner to recover the regiment's cannon that had been stolen in February 1956. The cannon had ended up in California and had been identified as the Barbados cannon in 1968. The prospective commanding officer of NAVFAC Barbados was then enlisted in a Navy effort called "Operation Golden Gun" to transport the long lost cannon back to its rightful place. The cannon was flown into Barbados 12 June 1978 by a plane of VP-30 and returned to the Barbados Regiment that day at Evening Parade.

NAVFAC Barbados was operated by the United States Navy for twenty-two years and was officially decommissioned on 31 March 1979.

Motto: Arcana Maris Quaerere

== Government of Barbados use ==
The structures of the former facility were used as a temporary prison in 2005 after a fire at HM Glendairy Prison. The Government of Barbados announced 29 February 2020 that the abandoned facility would be allocated funding to be used as a COVID-19 Quarantine and Isolation Centre.

== See also ==
- Benjamin Thurman Hacker
