= Syed Hammad Raza =

Pakistani civil servant (1970–2007)

- Born: January 9, 1970; Sharaqpur dist. Sheikhupura, Pakistan
- Died: May 14, 2007 (aged 37) islamabad, Pakistan
- Cause of death: Assassination
- Occupation: Former additional registrar supreme court of pakistan
- Spouse: Shabana Hamad
- Children: Two sons and a daughter

Syed Hammad Raza Shaheed (9 January 1970 – 14 May 2007), Additional Registrar, Supreme Court of Pakistan, was a civil servant belonging to the elite District Management Group of Central Superior Services of Pakistan. He was a close confidant of the suspended Chief Justice of Pakistan, Justice Iftikhar Muhammad Chaudhry, and served as his virtual staff officer until his gruesome murder on 14 May 2007. While Pakistani police is still investigating his murder, it is widely believed that he was target killed because he had refused to co-operate with authorities for providing false evidence which would incriminate Justice Chaudhry in the wake of the ongoing judicial crisis in Pakistan.

== Details ==
Widow of assassinated Additional Registrar of Supreme Court Syed Hamad Raza, Shabana Raza Monday has alleged police are trying to turn the assassination into a dacoity incident and said that her husband was targeted.

She told journalists that police are treating the assassination as a robbery-related crime, which is totally wrong. (The) Police (are) hiding the fact that her husband was gunned down, she held. She underlined that her husband was killed as a result of targeted killing as he was previously getting serious death threats.

It is pertinent to mention that unknown armed men on Monday gunned down Additional Registrar of Supreme Court Syed Hamad Raza at his residence in G-10/2 in Islamabad, the Capital of Pakistan. He has left a widow (37 years) and three children (two sons and one daughter).

He is regarded as a key witness by lawyers representing Pakistan's suspended chief justice in his fight against President Pervez Musharraf's move to sack him. Syed Hammad Raza, being the key witness of all this, after 12 May 2007 killings of 40 people in Karachi was going to reveal it to public was eliminated in emergency on 14 May 2007 through agencies with the help of police.

Syed Hammad Raza, an additional registrar of the Supreme Court, was shot at point-blank range by two or three gunmen just before dawn at his home here, police and relatives said. "He was an important person in our case", Munir Ahmed Malik, a lawyer on suspended Chief Justice Iftikhar Chaudhry's legal team, said. Another of Chaudhry's lawyers said Raza was working closely with the suspended chief justice. "He was witness to many things, like the chief justice said in his petition that some files were removed from his chamber on the day he was suspended", the lawyer, Tariq Mehmood, said. "He (Hammad) was under pressure", he said.

Two officers of the British High Commission, Consular Albert David and Helen Rawlins, also visited Mr Raza's house and talked to the widow who is a British national. When asked about their meeting with Ms Shabana, the diplomats said that being a British national "she had requested us to provide her security" but gave no details of any security provided to her family.

According to the family, four people broke into Mr Raza's official residence through the kitchen window at around 4.15 am. They overpowered his parents who lived on the ground floor, tied them up and asked them about Mr Raza. Syed Amjad Ali Mashedi Rizvi, father of Mr Raza, said the intruders held the teenage housemaid Ashee at gunpoint and forced her to take them upstairs to Mr Hammad's bedroom. "As my husband responded to the knocks and opened the door, we saw four clean-shaven men in trousers and shalwar kameez. They were aged between 28 and 35. One of them was holding a pistol and another carried a knife. On seeing Hammad, the gunman shot him in the head and fled", Ms Shabana said.

She said she ran downstairs crying for help and was surprised to see some policemen in the lawn. They did not do anything. However, police officer Shaukat Pervaiz, a neighbour, responded to her screams. SP Pervaiz, who is detailed with the prime minister's security squad, shouted at a police patrol, standing about 100 feet away from his house, to catch the culprits but by the time the patrol moved the attackers had disappeared.

Security agencies had questioned Mr Raza for four days after the removal of Chief Justice Iftikhar. Acting Chief Justice Rana Bhagwandas visited the residence of Mr Raza, who served as a DMG officer in Balochistan before being brought to the Supreme Court by Justice Iftikhar.

According to family and friends, Hammad was an extremely honest professional who never brought official matters home and did not disclose any secrets to his wife or family. However, he was known to confide in several government officials with whom he had personal friendships. Hammad also visited the European Parliament as part of a government delegation, forming close friendships with several European counterparts who continue to maintain contact with his family.

The acting chief justice directed the registrar of the Supreme Court to make arrangements with regard to burial and other matters and prepare a compensation package for the widow and children of the deceased. Asif Shahzad adds from Lahore: Mr Raza was buried in Lahore's Allama Iqbal Town.

Talking to Dawn, Intizar Mehdi, a cousin of the deceased, alleged that it was a target killing. "The moment Hammad opened the door, the intruders shot him in the head without having any argument", he said, adding that the robbers would not act the way the killers had. There was a lot of jewellery and cash in the house but the gunmen had not touched anything, he said. The deceased is survived by the wife and three children.

== Conspiracy ==
Chaudhry has been at the centre of a judicial crisis since Musharraf decided to sack him months ago over undisclosed allegations of misconduct. Analysts speculated Musharraf's motive is aimed at removing a possible obstacle should his plans for re-election run into constitutional challenges. Hammad was briefly detained on 9 March, the day Chaudhry was suspended, Malik said. Supreme Court's additional registrar Syed Hamad Amjad Raza was shot dead by four men who broke into his house before dawn on Monday. Talking to Dawn, a police officer claimed that the murder had been committed by robbers, but Mr Hammad Raza's widow Shabana, a witness to the killing, said it was a target killing. She alleged that the government and agencies were involved in the murder.

She said that she saw several policemen lurking around in the lawn of her house when she ran out crying for help, but they did nothing to catch the culprits. She vowed to do everything possible to bring those responsible to justice. Her brother, Abid Hussain Shah, also insisted that it was not a case of robbery, because nothing had been found missing from the house, except two cellphones. "It's a target killing and a message to judges", he said. Soon after the murder, judges of the Supreme Court, including Chief Justice Iftikhar Mohammad Chaudhry, visited Mr Raza's house and, taking suo motu action, ordered the Inspector General of Police and the Senior Superintendent of Police of Islamabad to appear before the court on Tuesday.

Additional questions about the killing were raised again when it was disclosed that three policemen were deployed at Raza's house on security detail. Ms Raza said that when she ran downstairs screaming for help, there were policemen on the front lawn who did nothing.

According to reports, Raza had told family and friends he had been summoned by unidentified investigative agencies "trying to get information about the alleged 'wrongdoing' of the chief justice. His contention was that, yes, he would stand witness, but not for any party, only for truth and justice".

Pakistan's security agencies have a notorious reputation for their alleged involvement in the so-called "disappearance" of political opponents of the Government. Chief Justice Chaudhry, before he was declared "non-functional", was in the forefront of dealing with complaints to the Supreme Court made by the families of so-called "disappeared".

Last night's developments came as a full bench of the Supreme Court was due to make a second attempt to begin consideration of the case brought against the Chief Justice.

An initial attempt to begin proceedings was thwarted when one of the 14 judges set to hear the case, Falak Sher, declined to take part.

Security Insiders Claim Musharraf is responsible for the murder as he was carrying out clean-up operations and hence the Chief justice and Hammad were an Obstacle to his Re-Election and the special Complaints Cell of the supreme Court was also administered by Hammad. Hammad had compiled evidences regarding Steel Mills Case, Missing peoples files and several other miscarriages of justice by the government. All the Missing peoples Files were also kept by him and some of Hammads journalist contacts in media are rumoured to have copies. It is rumoured that some senators and ISI contacts loyal to the General also tried to Offer Hammad Promotions and Bribes to provide false evidence and testify against the Chief Justice or help in recruiting Justice Iftikhar into the Musharraf camp, unfortunately his honesty was the reason for his demise and Pakistan lost an invaluable son to Corruption.

Government insiders also claim that Ex ISI Chief Ijaz Shah's name is constantly linked with the Investigation and then swept under the carpet, "It smells of his Operation", whether directly or indirectly he is involved. Ijaz Shah in recent times has been known to be Musharraf's right-hand man and has been rumoured to be involved in all his Covert operations that made him widely unpopular, Missing Peoples case, Sacking of Chief Justice, Syed Hammad Murder case, Indian terror attacks etc. naming a few. Ijaz Shah has been rewarded generously since his alignment with Musharraf and is currently residing in Australia – Sydney after initially having his residency rejected due to terror links. The source further added since ISI are involved this case like all important cases will never be solved.

Three people are in custody over the murder of Syed Hammad and the person who ordered it according to the Accused had disappeared. Ex DSP Mir Afzal has been mentioned, yet it seems this person never existed or has vanished.

"We will supervise the police investigation and will take care of the family", Justice Javed Iqbal told reporters. "Law and order is deteriorating in the country and it is a moment to think for everybody", he said. IGP Iftikhar Ahmad told Dawn that a seven-member police team had been constituted to investigate the murder "on different lines to the previous assumption of Robbery".

== Syed Hammad Raza Gold Medal ==
Syed Hammad Raza Shaheed gold medal and scholarship have been announced by his widow at a function held at Quaid e Azam University Islamabad. The function was attended by Hammad Raza's family, friends, University Faculty and high ranking government officials. Hammad Raza's Wife, Father and faculty members addressed the function which was followed by a slideshow of Hammads pictures and achievements. A faculty member who attended the function said of the event as an emotional Affair and at one point the whole audience was reduced to tears when his wife Shabana spoke of her life after Hammad and how this Void is unbearable. She also mentioned how his first priority in life was his loyalty to the state and how he is martyr of the 21st century for Pakistan. During Her speech Hammad's pictures played in the background.

== Port Hammad ==
The Village within District Sharaqpur where Syed Hammad Raza belonged to has been Renamed PORT HAMMAD to honour his services to the state.

== Bio ==
Syed Hamad Raza born in Sharaqpur district Shekhupura central Punjab. He did his Masters in International Relations from Quaid-e-Azam University Islamabad with gold medal and later passed competition exam to join government civil service.

== Re-Instatement of the Chief Justice ==
On 24 March 2008, the new Pakistani PM Yousaf Raza Gillani ordered Chaudhry's release from house arrest. However, he did not restore the chief justice. Later three agreements for the restoration of the judges were signed by Asif Ali Zardari, the chairman of the Pakistan Peoples Party, to whom Gillani also belongs, and Nawaz Sharif, the chairman of the PML-N, the chief opposition party. But the chief justice remained unrestored. This led to a revival of the lawyers movement for the restoration of judges.

In October 2008, Chaudhry visited the Supreme Court building for the first time since his arrest. He vowed to be reinstated as Chief Justice.

The Lawyers' Movement announced a "long march" for the restoration of the judges, especially Chief Justice Iftikhar from 12 to 16 March 2009. The government of Pakistan refused to reinstate the judges and declared section 144 in effect in three of the four provinces of Pakistan thereby forbidding any form of gatherings of the "long march". Arrangements were made to block all roads and other means of transport to prevent the lawyers from reaching the federal capital, Islamabad. Workers of the main political parties in opposition and the lawyers movement as well as other known persons from the civil society were arrested. Despite these efforts, the movement continued and was able to break through the blockade in Lahore en route to Islamabad in the night between 15 and 16 March 2009. A few hours later, on the morning of 16 March 2009 by the prayers of the poor who were given justice by the respected justice, the prime minister of Pakistan restored Chaudhary Iftikahar as chief justice of Pakistan through an executive order address to the nation after which the opposition agreed to stop the "long march".

== See also ==
- Iftikhar Muhammad Chaudhry
- 2007 Karachi Riots
- Ijaz Ahmed Shah
- Pervez Musharraf
- Benazir Bhutto
- Assassination of Benazir Bhutto
