= Checker Hall =

Populated place in Saint Lucy, Barbados

Coordinates: 13°17′N 59°38′W

Checker Hall is a populated place in the parish of Saint Lucy, Barbados. Youth Milan FC is based in Checker Hall.

== See also ==
- List of cities, towns and villages in Barbados
