= 2010 Karachi riots =

Demonstrations after the murder of Pakistani politician Raza Haider

- Location: Karachi, Sindh, Pakistan
- Date: August 3, 2010-
- Attack type: Riots
- Deaths: 90+
- Injuries: 100+

The 2010 Karachi riots started on August 3, 2010, after the assassination of Parliament member Raza Haider, a member of the Muttahida Qaumi Movement political party, on the night of August 2, 2010, in Karachi, Pakistan. The Muttahida Qaumi Movement (MQM) blamed the Awami National Party, it's political rival, for the killing. Haider, was killed as he attended a funeral at a mosque.

By August 6 at least 90 people were killed in reprisal attacks and more than 100 people injured in widespread violence that engulfed the city. Economic losses over two days of riots were estimated to be about 17 billion Pakistani rupees (approximately 200 million USD).

== Background ==
Karachi has a history of political bloodshed stretching back to the late 1980s when the city was regularly rocked by political and ethnic shootings that killed dozens every week. Analysts said the city was again in the grip of a political turf war.

Karachi, which is provincial capital of Sindh and Pakistan's commercial capital and largest city, has a population of 18 million and contributes about 70% of the country's tax income. The city has seen a wave of political killings in 2010 which have deepened ethnic tensions.

== Violence ==
Most of those killed and injured in the reprisal shootings came from the smaller Pashtuns. The MQM, which ruled Karachi until earlier 2010, represents the city's Muhajir community. Most of the injured were Pashtuns, with a few Sindhis and Punjabis among the victims, said one source. Jan Sardar, a 35-year-old Pashtun, was shot seven times. "When they fired the first shot, I jumped in a sewer to save myself, but they came after me and fired more bullets," he said from his hospital bed. The gunman was carrying an MQM flag, he added. Clothes trader Ahmed Shah, who was shot in the leg, was travelling in a bus with 50 passengers when it came under fire. "I didn't see who it was; it was dark," he said. A cousin said he saw seven dead bodies at the site. Iqbal Hussain, a teenager from Swat, said he was left for dead after a gunman burst into his house in north Karachi, opening fire. A less fortunate friend was killed.

Several buildings were set on fire and vehicles destroyed after angry mobs went through the city streets seeking revenge. Most of those killed were Pashtuns. Most of the injured had been shot point blank and were targeted for their ethnicity. In the neighboring city of Hyderabad gunmen attacked a train going to Lahore, injuring the driver and destroying the locomotive.

== Reactions ==
MQM declared three days of mourning after the assassination. Business activities in the city virtually shut down. The local police arrested 40 people including 20 Islamist hardliners. Interior minister Rehman Malik blamed Sipah-e-Sahaba of fomenting violence against the minority Shia community in Pakistan. President of Pakistan, Asif Ali Zardari, ordered an immediate investigation into the violence. The Karachi Stock Exchange saw very slow activity in the aftermath of the riots and the rupee hit a record low of 85.80 to a United States dollar.

== See also ==
- Sectarian violence in Pakistan
- 2009 Karachi bombing
- 2007 Karachi riots
- 2019 Ghotki riots
- MQM Militancy
