= Harrison Point Lighthouse =

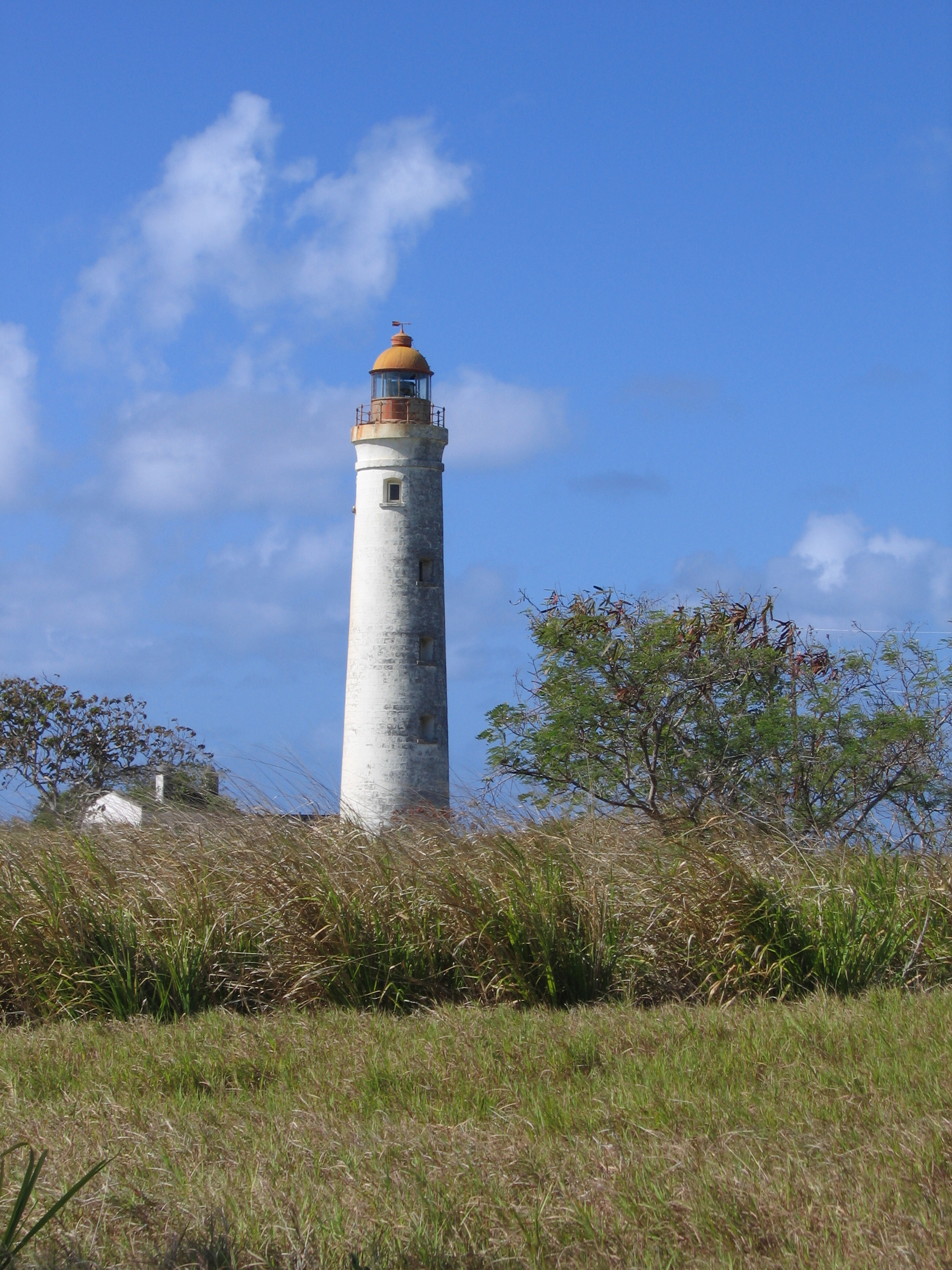
- Harrison Point Lighthouse in 2008
- Location: Saint Lucy; Barbados
- Coordinates: 13°18′30.7″N 59°38′53.4″W

Tower
- Constructed: 1925
- Construction: concrete block
- Height: 26 metres (85 ft)
- Shape: cylindrical tower with balcony and lantern
- Markings: white tower and red lantern

Light
- First lit: 2011
- Deactivated: 2007-2011
- Focal height: 59 metres (194 ft)
- Range: 3 nautical miles (5.6 km; 3.5 mi)
- Characteristic: F R

Harrison Point Lighthouse is a lighthouse located in the northern Parish of Saint Lucy, Barbados.

== History ==
The lighthouse has a cylindrical shape and it was the latest, of four lighthouses, to be built on the island, in 1925. It is built in concrete block, it has a height of 26 metres (85 ft) and a focal height of 59 metres (194 ft). The tower is white painted and the lantern is red; its characteristic, before the temporary deactivation. was two white flashes every 15 seconds. The lighthouse was deactivated probably in 2007, as reported by Admiralty, because it was on the ground of a prison; the tower was abandoned and the keeper's house ruined. In 2011 the Admiralty confirmed the activity of the lighthouse with a continuous red light.

== See also ==
- List of lighthouses in Barbados
- United States Naval Facility, Barbados
