= Iqbal Kazmi =

Syed Mohammad Iqbal Kazmi is a Karachi-based human rights activist in Pakistan. He was a correspondent for the Human Rights Commission South Asia and the chief editor of Weekly Special Report. He is known to have registered cases against K-Electric, Pakistan Electronic Media Regulatory Authority, Government of Sindh and for IDPs. He moved the Sindh High Court for judicial inquiries into the Ashura blast and targeted killings in Karachi. He also moved the Supreme Court of Pakistan against the beneficiaries of the National Reconciliation Ordinance (NRO), challenging the eligibility of the beneficiaries.

== Kidnapping ==
On 3 June 2007, the government announced that it would impose a ban on any televised live talk show that discusses the issue of the chief justice's suspension. It threatened to take punitive action against broadcasters that displayed an anti-state or anti-national stance and cast "aspersions on the integrity of the armed forces". Under Musharraf's decree, the government amended the PEMRA Ordinance to impose these new restrictions on private television channels on 4 June 2007. Opposition parties and lawyers campaigned against these amendments and observed a "black day" in solidarity with the broadcasters and journalists. Amongst the petitioners was the civil rights activist Syed Mohammad Iqbal Kazmi who had recently filed a petition in the Sindh High Court on 12 May violence.

Kazmi was abducted by unidentified persons on 6 June 2007 after he had filed his petition against the PEMRA ordinance. He was later released by his abductors on the condition that he would leave Karachi along with his family. However upon his release, Kazmi revealed that the reason for his abduction was rather his petition on the 12 May violence. He told of his harrowing ordeal where he was quizzed about his association with Imran Khan's PTI and the reasons as to why he named MQM founder and chief Altaf Hussain in his petition. His petition had also included the names of several other major political and government figures as respondents alongside Hussain. The named respondents included Sindh chief minister Arbab Ghulam Rahim, federal interior secretary Syed Kamal Shah, adviser to Sindh CM on home affairs Waseem Akhtar, chief secretary Shakeel Durrani, home secretary Ghulam M. Muhtaram Naqvi, provincial police officer Niaz A. Siddiqui, CCPO Azhar A. Farooqui, and the SHOs of City Courts and Jamshed Quarters police stations.

Amnesty International reported that Iqbal Kazmi was abducted on 6 June 2007. He was reportedly tortured and regained consciousness the following day in a park in the Clifton area of Karachi. His kidnappers told him that he would be killed unless he left the city by 12 June 2007.

On August 1, 2007, the wife of Iqbal Kazmi was kidnapped while she was on her way to high court to meet her husband who had been arrested on fraud charges on 12 June 2007.

The Police refused to register an FIR against the assailants. However, the Additional District and Session Judge, Karachi South, Mohammed Azeem, the police register an FIR against those involved in the attack.

== Arrest ==
On June 12, 2007, Iqbal Kazmi was arrested by police in cases of cheating, and was sent to judicial remand until June 16 by a judicial magistrate at the Malir Cantonment court. Police stated that Kazmi had given checks to individuals that were dishonored later. Kazmi’s lawyers alleged that the cases were fabricated against him. Sadia Kazmi also alleged that she had not been provided with the FIR about the crime.

In court, Kazmi stated that he had been jailed because he had threatened that he would go on hunger strike in front of Sindh chief minister's house.

Kazmi was granted bail by the Sindh High court on 18 August 2007. His next hearing was expected to be heard on 22 August 2007.

== See also ==
- Human rights in Pakistan
