= Saint Clement's Church, Barbados =

Church in Saint Lucy, Barbados

Coordinates: 13.30622°N 59.59152°W

Saint Clement's Church, Lowlands, is an Anglican church located in the parish of Saint Lucy in Barbados.The Priest in Charge is the Rev. Keith Griffith.
