= Benjamin Thurman Hacker =

United States Navy admiral (1935–2003)

Benjamin T. Hacker
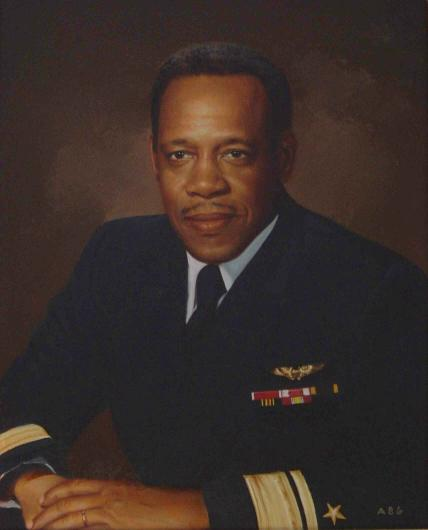
- Born: September 19, 1935; Washington, D.C., US
- Died: December 28, 2003 (aged 68); Norfolk, Virginia, US
- Burial place: Arlington National Cemetery
- Military career
- Allegiance: United States of America
- Branch: United States Navy
- Service years: 1958–1988
- Rank: Rear Admiral (UH)
- Commands: US Naval Facility Barbados, WI; NROTC Florida A & M University; Patrol Squadron 24 (VP-24); NAS Brunswick, Maine; USMEPCOM; COMFAIRMED; COMARSURVRECFORSIXFLT; COMARAIRMED; NTC San Diego; Naval Base San Diego
- Awards: Defense Superior Service Medal; Legion of Merit; Meritorious Service Medal
- Other work: Insurance Executive (USAA); Director – CA Dept of Veterans Affairs

Rear Admiral Benjamin Thurman Hacker (1935–2003) was a U.S. Naval officer, who became the first Naval Flight Officer (NFO) to achieve Flag rank.

== Early life ==
Hacker was born September 19, 1935, in Washington, D.C. His father, C. Leroy Hacker, was an author, Baptist pastor and a chaplain in the U.S. Army. His mother, Alzeda (Crockett) Hacker, was an accomplished musician. Of their three children, Benjamin was the eldest.

Benjamin attended Wittenberg University in Springfield, Ohio, graduating in 1957 with a B.A. Degree in Science. He married his wife, Jeanne, in 1958.

== Naval service ==
After completing the Navy's Aviation Officer Candidate School in Pensacola, Florida, in September 1958, Hacker was commissioned Ensign and subsequently received the designation of Naval Aviation Observer (NAO). Hacker gained experience as a Navigator and Tactical Coordinator in SP-2H "Neptune" and P-3C "Orion" aircraft through numerous operational assignments in the far reaches of the Atlantic and Pacific Oceans and Mediterranean Sea.

He took command of the United States Naval Facility, Barbados, West Indies on July 2, 1968. In 1972, he established the Naval ROTC Unit at Florida A & M University, in Tallahassee, Florida, and served as the first Commanding Officer and Professor of Naval Science of this unit. In 1974 he became Commanding Officer of Patrol Squadron 24 (VP-24), a P-3C Orion Squadron stationed in Jacksonville, Florida, and was promoted to captain following his squadron command tour.

In June 1978, he completed studies in National Security Policy at the Industrial College of the Armed Forces, and earned a Masters of Science Degree in Administration from George Washington University in Washington, D.C. In August 1978, he was assigned as Commanding Officer, Naval Air Station, Brunswick, Maine.

In 1980, then-Captain Hacker was selected for promotion to rear admiral and assumed duties as Commander, U.S. Military Enlistment Processing Command with headquarters in Fort Sheridan, Illinois. In 1982, he became Commander Fleet Air Mediterranean; Commander Maritime Surveillance and Reconnaissance Forces, U.S. Sixth Fleet; and Commander Maritime Air Forces Mediterranean simultaneously with headquarters in Naples, Italy. In 1986, he was assigned as Commander, Naval Training Center, San Diego. During this assignment he was also assigned Commander, Naval Base San Diego. He held both commands simultaneously for several months. In 1988, at the completion of his assignment as Commander, Naval Base San Diego, Rear Admiral Hacker retired from the U.S. Navy.

Rear Admiral Hacker was the first Naval Flight Officer (NFO) to be selected for Flag rank in the United States Navy. He held ten commands over the course of his 30-year military career. Included among Rear Admiral Hacker's personal decorations are the Defense Superior Service Medal, the Legion of Merit with three Gold Stars, and the Meritorious Service Medal.

On November 3, 2005, the "Commander, Task Force 67" headquarters building located in Sigonella, Sicily was dedicated in his honor.

== Civilian ==
After retiring from the Navy, Rear Admiral Hacker worked at financial-services firm USAA as assistant vice president for policy service, at the organization's western regional office in Sacramento.

In the early 1990s, at the request of then-Governor Pete Wilson, Hacker served for two years as director of the California Department of Veterans Affairs and then rejoined USAA as regional vice president and general manager of its western region. He moved to San Antonio in his next post in December 1995.

Hacker also held posts as Regional Senior Vice President/General Manager in the company's Mid-Atlantic Region headquartered in Norfolk, Virginia. Rear Admiral Hacker retired from USAA in 1998 but continued to serve on various local and national boards.

On December 28, 2003, Rear Admiral Hacker died from complications relating to chronic lymphocytic leukemia, a disease which he battled for 12 years. He was buried at Arlington National Cemetery.
