= Naval Auxiliary Air Station Chincoteague =

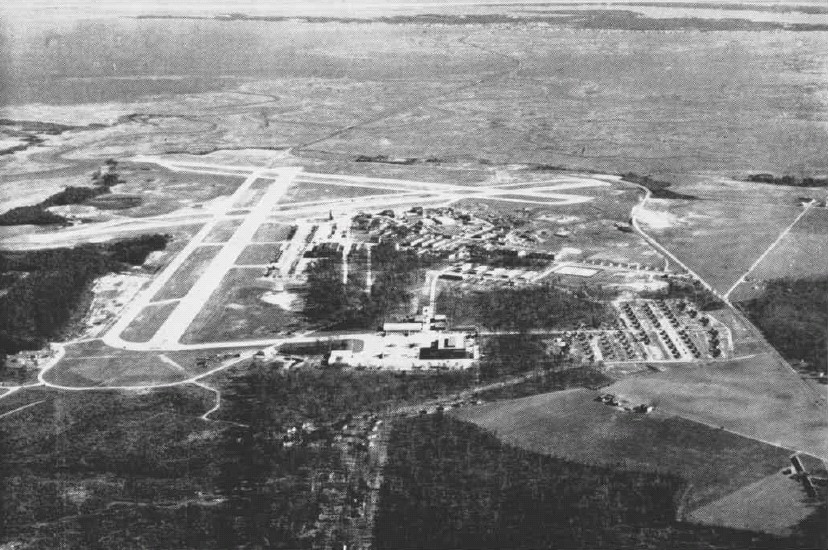
- Aerial view of NAAS Chincoteague in the mid-1940s
- IATA: none; ICAO: none

Summary
- Operator: United States Navy (transferred to NASA)
- Built: 1943
- In use: 1943 - 1959
- Coordinates: 37°56′26.66″N 75°27′44.98″W
- Interactive map of Naval Auxiliary Air Station Chincoteague

Runways
Direction	Length		Surface
Direction	ft	m	Surface
22/04	8,750	2,670	asphalt
28/10	8,000	2,440	asphalt
35/17	4,800	1,465	asphalt

Naval Auxiliary Air Station Chincoteague was a U.S. Navy Auxiliary Air Station near Chincoteague Island, Virginia. In 1941, the United States entered World War II; early the following year, the Germans torpedoed two merchant ships off the Assateague coast. To guard the coast, the United States Army established two small posts on Virginia's Eastern Shore, one each at Accomac and Chincoteague. The Navy established the Chincoteague Naval Auxiliary Air Station in 1943, across from Chincoteague on the mainland. One young pilot being trained there, future president George Herbert Walker Bush, got in trouble for "buzzing" the house of a young woman he had met at a dance.

In 1959, NASA acquired the former Naval Auxiliary Air Station Chincoteague, and engineering and administrative activities were moved to this location. In 1974, the Wallops Station was named Wallops Flight Center. The name was changed to Wallops Flight Facility in 1981, when it became part of Goddard Space Flight Center.
