= Saint Lucy, Barbados =

Saint Lucy
- Parish
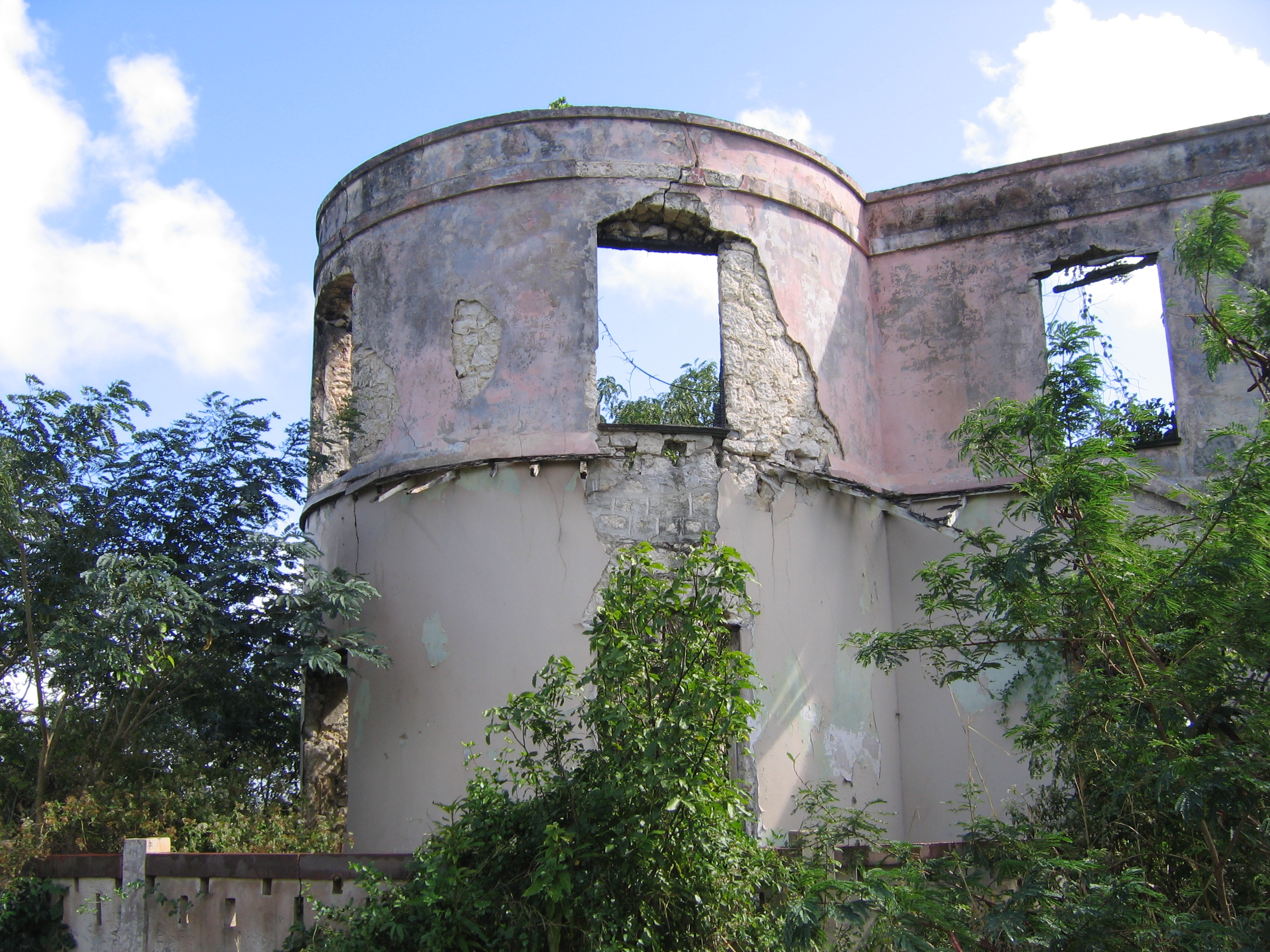
- Ruins, Saint Lucy, Barbados

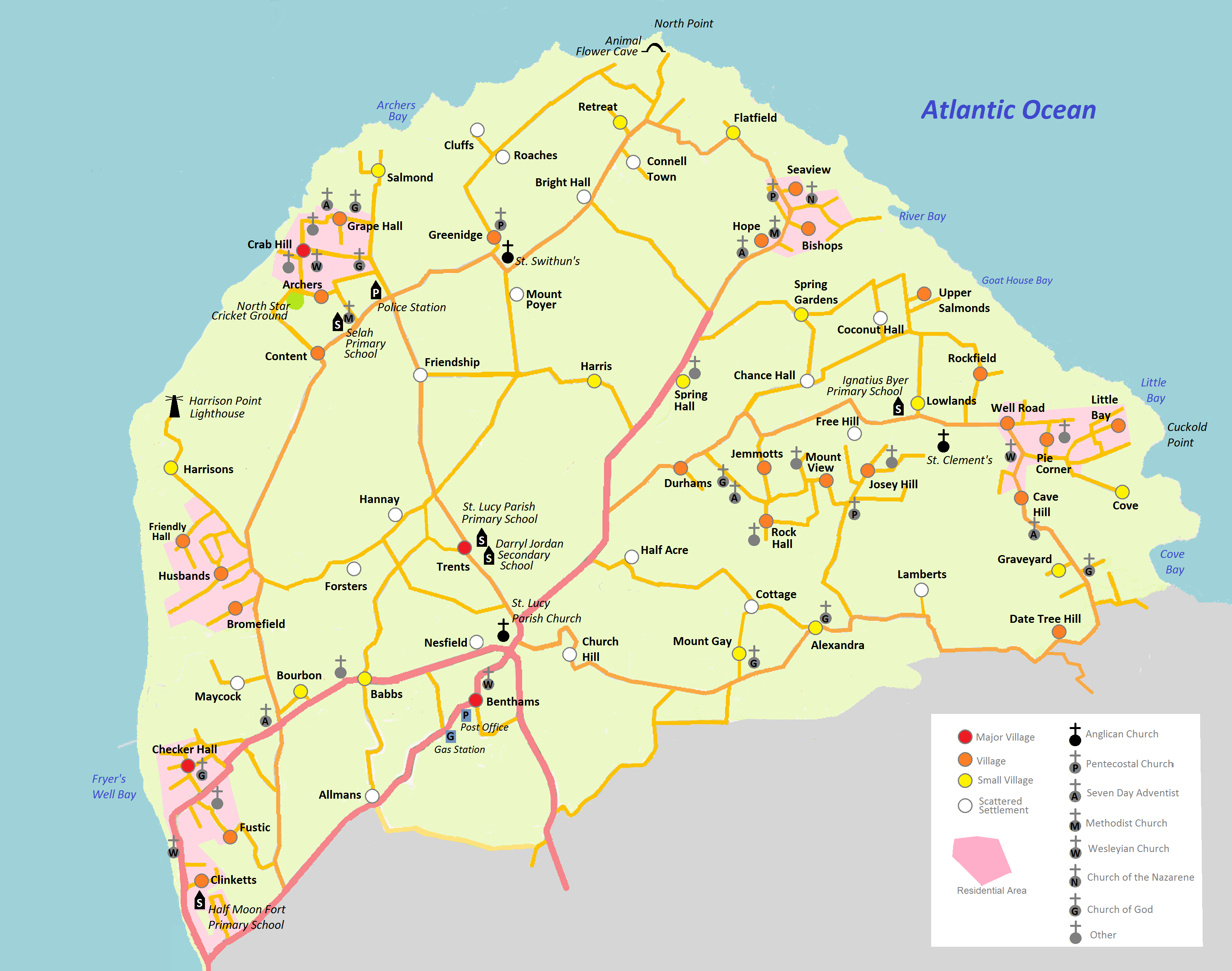
- Map of Barbados showing Saint Lucy
- Coordinates: 13°18′N 59°37′W
- Country: Barbados
- Largest city: Checker Hall

Government
  - Type: Parliamentary democracy
  - Parliamentary seats: 1

Area
  - Total: 36 km^{2} (14 sq mi)

Population (2010 census)
  - Total: 9,758
  - Density: 270/km^{2} (700/sq mi)
- ISO 3166 code: BB-07

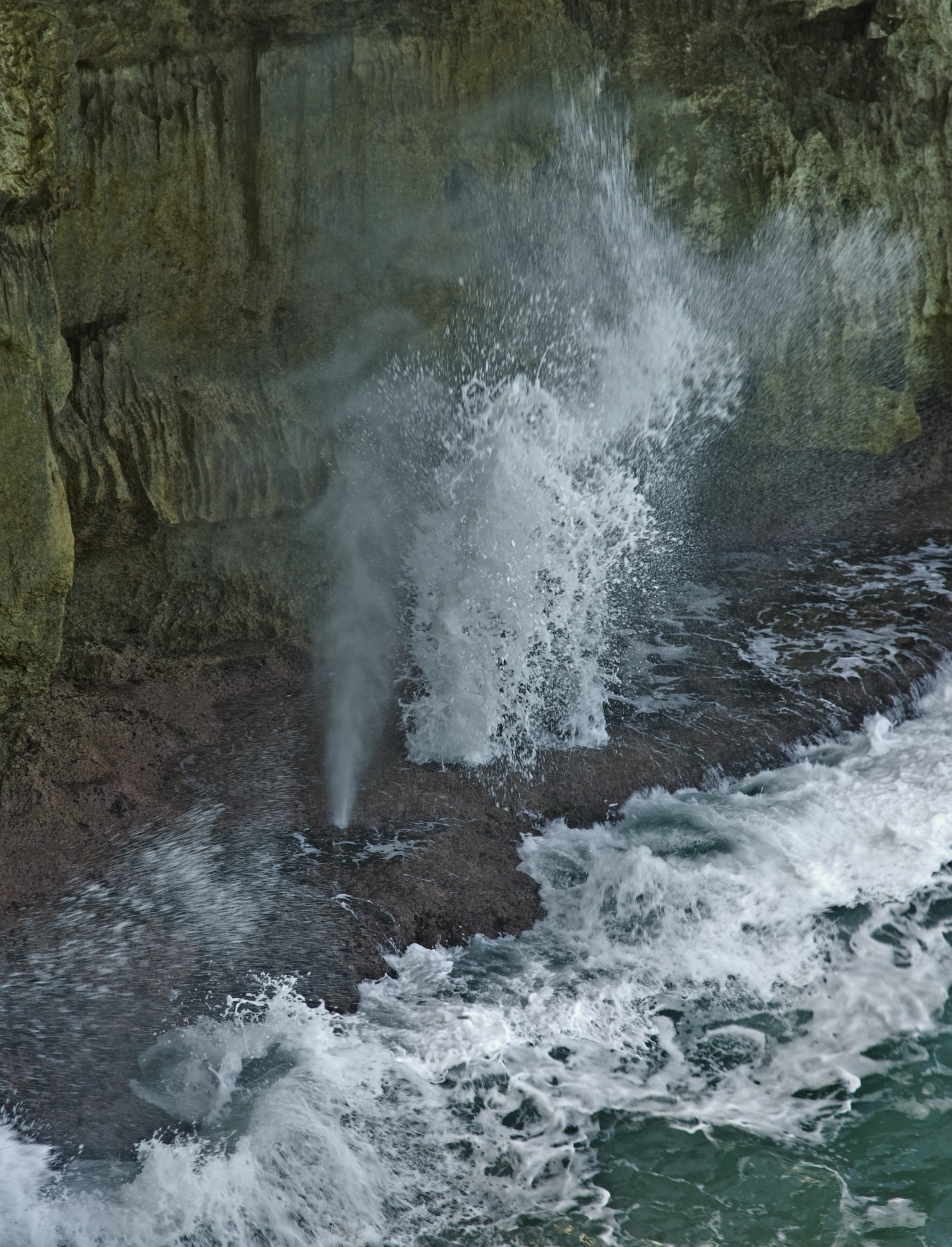
Blowhole, St. Lucy parish coast.

The parish of St. Lucy is the northernmost in the country of Barbados. Saint Lucy is the only parish of Barbados out of the eleven to be named after a female patron saint, Saint Lucy of Syracuse. Saint Lucy's shape also resembles a peninsula, surrounded on three sides by the Atlantic Ocean to the north, east and west. The Harrison Point Lighthouse is located in Harrisons, Saint Lucy between Great Head and Norse's Bay, also in Saint Lucy. To the south lies the neighbouring Parish of Saint Peter.

Saint Lucy is the most distant part of Barbados from the capital city Bridgetown, located in the parish of Saint Michael or Grantley Adams International Airport in Christ Church. Saint Lucy remains one of the less populated parts of the island because of its remote location.

The closest major town to Saint Lucy in Barbados is Speightstown located in the parish of Saint Peter.

Saint Lucy is the birthplace of Barbados's first Prime Minister, Errol Barrow. It is also the birthplace of cricketers; Charlie Griffith, Manny Martindale and Kemar Roach.

The historic Parish church St. Lucy is located in the center of the parish, near Nesfield. There is a second Anglican church, St. Swithun's at Greenidge, and a third one, St. Clement's, near Lowlands.

== Geography ==
=== Populated places ===
The parish contains the following villages and hamlets:

- Alexandra
- Allmans
- Archers
- Babbs
- Benthams
- Bishops
- Bourbon
- Bright Hall
- Bromefield
- Cave Hill - The community has three churches and a grocery store. It is near the coastal area located on the north-eastern Atlantic Ocean side of the island.
- Chance Hall
- Checker Hall
- Church Hill
- Clinketts
- Cluffs
- Coconut Hall
- Connell Town
- Content
- Cottage
- Crab Hill
- Date Tree Hill
- Durham
- Flatfield
- Fosters
- Friendship
- Fustic
- Grape Hall
- Grave Yard
- Greenidges
- Half Acre
- Hannays
- Harris
- Harrisons
- Hope
- Husbands
- Jemmotts
- Josey Hill
- Lamberts
- Little Bay
- Mount Gay
- Mount Poyer
- Mount View
- Nesfield
- Pie Corner
- Retreat
- River Bay
- Rockfield
- Rock Hall
- Salmonds
- Seaview
- Spring Garden
- Spring Hall
- Trents
- Upper Salmonds
- Well Road

Smaller settlements are Avis Town, Blacksage Alley, Free Hill, Friendly Hall, Half Moon Fort, Maycock, Mount Gilboa, Pickerings, Roaches, Shermans, Sutherland and Swampy Town.

The police station and the cricket ground are situated in Crab Hill, the post office is in Benthams. There are four Primary Schools, at Clinkett (West), Content (North), Lowland (East) and Trent (Central). The Daryll Jordan Secondary School is in Trents too.

=== Parishes bordering Saint Lucy ===
- Saint Peter - South

=== Defined boundaries ===
- With St. Peter: – Starting from a point on the seashore directly west of the junction of Highway IC and the public road leading from Shermans to Half Moon Fort, the line travels eastwards to the centre-line of the said road junction; then in a north-easterly direction along Highway 1C to its junction with the private (estate) road leading to Alleynedale Hall; then along this private road and diverting along the northern branch of this road so as to leave the plantation buildings in St. Peter to meet the public road called Highway A leading from Rose Hill to St. Lucy's Church; then northwards along Highway A to its junction with the public road called Luke Hill; then along this public road in a north-easterly and northerly direction to the junction with the unclassified road leading to Castle Plantation; then along this road in an easterly and south- easterly direction to a point opposite the monument (B.l) placed on the eastern side; then in a north-easterly direction along the line joining this point and another monument (13.2) situate on the western side of an unclassified road at Lamberts and to the centre line of the road; then along this road in a north- westerly and north-easterly direction to its junction with the public road leading from Lamberts to Graveyard; then along this public road in an easterly, north- easterly and northerly direction to its junction with the unclassified road leading to Boscobelle; then along this road in a north-easterly, south-easterly and north- easterly direction to the centre of the bridge situate at the point just before the road turns to a south-easterly direction; then in a north-easterly direction (30" 16') to the sea.

== Historical Use ==
Saint Lucy was the location of a United States Naval Facility (NAVFAC), a shore terminal of the Sound Surveillance System (SOSUS), adjacent to the Harrison Point Lighthouse. NAVFAC Barbados was in commission 1 October 1957 to 31 March 1979. The Barbados array made undersea surveillance history on 6 July 1962 when it made the first detection of a Soviet nuclear submarine that was transiting off the coast of Norway entering the Greenland-Iceland-United Kingdom (GIUK) gap.

== Politics ==
Saint Lucy covers one geographical constituency for the House of Assembly:

- Saint Lucy

== See also ==
- Caribbean
- Saint Clement's Church, Barbados
