= Burewal =

- Village
- Location in Punjab, India Burewal (India)
- Coordinates: 31.352718°N 75.196852°E
- Country: India
- State: Punjab
- District: Kapurthala

Government
  - Type: Panchayati raj (India)
  - Body: Gram panchayat

Population (2011)
  - Total: 40
- Sex ratio 24/16♂/♀

Languages
  - Official: Punjabi
  - Other spoken: Hindi
- Time zone: UTC+5:30 (IST)
- PIN: 144602
- Telephone code: 01822
- ISO 3166 code: IN-PB
- Vehicle registration: PB-09
- Website: kapurthala.gov.in

Burewal is a village in Kapurthala district of Punjab State, India. It is located 10 kilometres (6.2 mi) from Kapurthala, which is both district and sub-district headquarters of Burewal. The village is administrated by a Sarpanch, who is an elected representative.

== Demography ==
According to the report published by Census India in 2011, Burewal has a total number of 9 houses and a population of 40, including 24 males and 16 females. The Literacy rate of Burewal is 52.94%, lower than the state average of 75.84%. The population of children under the age of 6 years is 6 which is 15.00% of the total population of Burewal, and the child sex ratio is approximately 500, lower than state average of 846.

== Air travel connectivity ==
The closest airport to the village is Sri Guru Ram Dass Jee International Airport.
