= Ibi, Spain =

Ibi
- Town and municipality
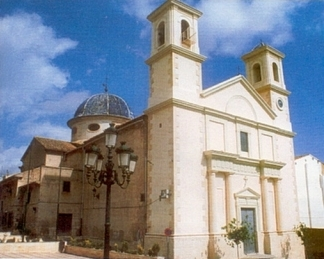
- Church of Transfiguració del Senyor

- Flag Coat of arms

- Location in the Province of Alicante Location in the Valencian Community Location in Spain
- Coordinates: 38°37′38″N 0°34′31″W
- Country: Spain
- Autonomous community: Valencian Community
- Province: Alicante
- Comarca: Alcoià
- Judicial district: Ibi

Government
  - Alcalde (Mayor): Rafael Serralta (PP)

Area
  - Total: 62.52 km^{2} (24.14 sq mi)
- Elevation: 816 m (2,677 ft)

Population (2025-01-01)
  - Total: 24,500
  - Density: 392/km^{2} (1,010/sq mi)
- (INE)
- Demonyms: iberut, -da (Val.) ibense (Sp.)
- Official language(s): Valencian; Spanish
- Linguistic area: Valencian
- Time zone: UTC+1 (CET)
  - Summer (DST): UTC+2 (CEST)
- Postal code: 03440
- Website: Official website

Ibi (Note: Pronunciation of Ibi: Valencian: [ˈibi] Spanish: [ˈiβi]) is a town and municipality located in the comarca of Alcoià, in the province of Alicante, Valencian Community, Spain. As of 2009, Ibi has a total population of c. 24,000 inhabitants. The town, which is located 37 kilometers from the city of Alicante, is surrounded by mountains and gorges.

The economy of Ibi is chiefly based on the toy industry, the most important of this kind in Spain. As a result, many other related industries have also emerged in the last years: plastic, metal, machinery and others. There are some factories making construction materials, ice creams and tiger nut milk, also. Some of the most important monuments in Ibi are the Catholic Church of the Transfiguration and the monument to the Three Wise Men, possibly the only one in the world.

Ibi was also the location for the issue of both the 25 céntimos and 1 peseta by the Republicans during 1937. Worldwide, it is famous for the centuries of annual festival of Els Enfarinats; in particular, the fight with flour and eggs.

== Twin towns ==
- Tomelloso, Spain

== See also ==
- Font Roja Natural Park
