= Els Enfarinats =

Battle using flour and eggs in Spain

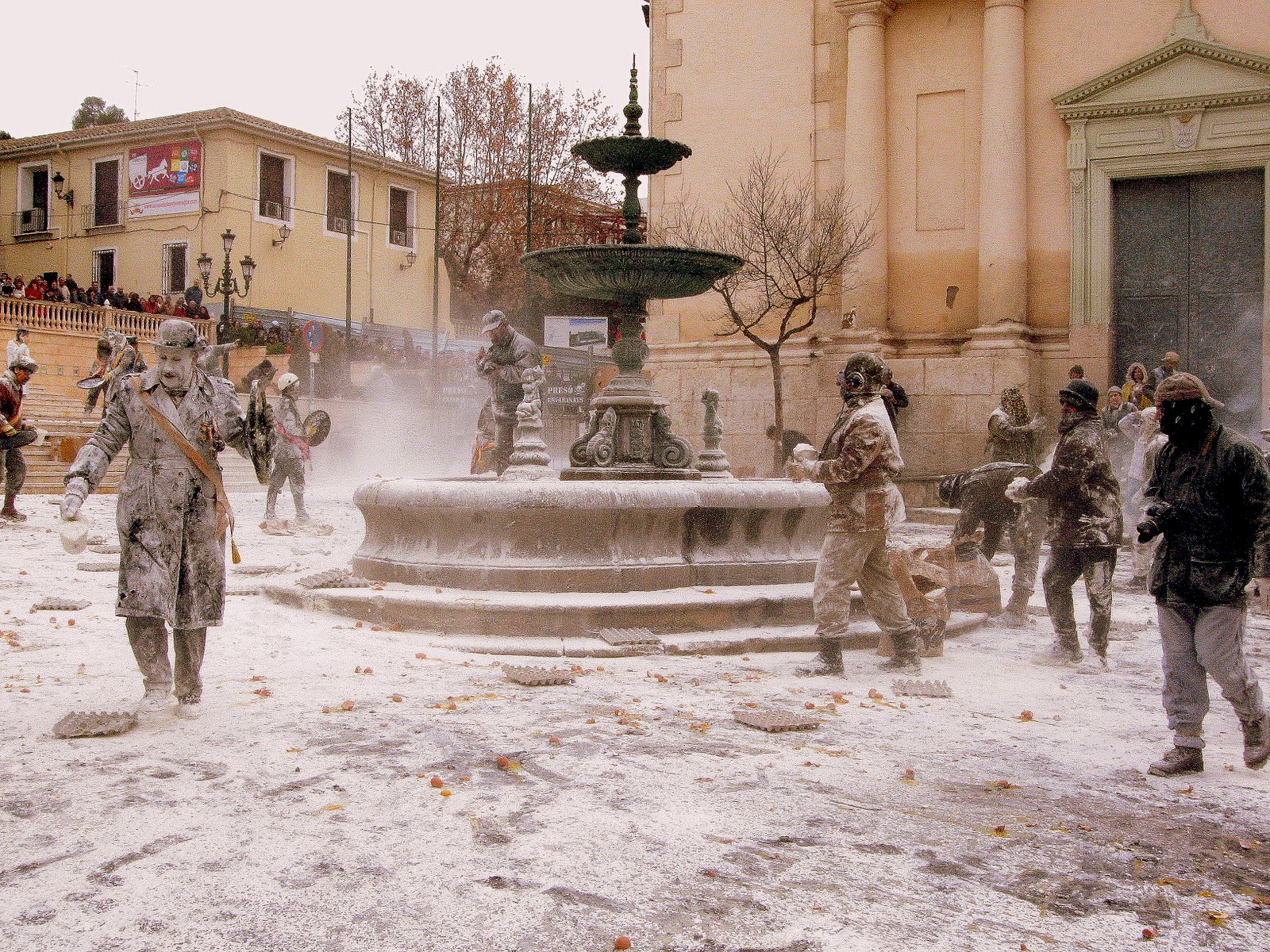
Els Enfarinats

The annual festival of Els Enfarinats (Valencian pronunciation: [elz aɱfaɾiˈnats]) takes place in the town of Ibi in Alicante, Spain on December 28, as part of celebrations related to the Day of the Innocents. Els enfarinats comes from the Valencian word for "breading", and roughly translates to "the breaded ones" or "the floured ones". In the day-long festival, participants known as the Els Enfarinats dress in mock military dress and stage a mock coup d'état. Meanwhile, the Casats i Fadrins, accompanied by a band of street musicians called the Rondalla, known by the name of Sonet, Xirimita and Tabal, tour the city. At 8 am, the Els Enfarinats take the city under the slogan "New Justice", and at 9 am the Race for Mayor will take place in which it will be decided who is to be Mayor of the Els Enfarinats. Then, the act of L'Aixavegó is carried out in the Plaça de l'Església (Church Square), where the Els Enfarinats reside. Here, it is decided that those who do not pay the fine will go to jail. At midday, a collection called the Arreplegada dels Enfarinats takes place through the streets of the old quarter and of the city centre of Ibi, terminating in the Sant Joaquim Sanctuary. They exercise their authority under a blaze of fireworks, flour bombs and eggs. At five o'clock in the afternoon the authority of Els Enfarinats comes to an end giving way to the celebration of the traditional Dansà.

The tradition is over 200 years old.
