= Harry E. Sears (admiral) =

American Navy admiral

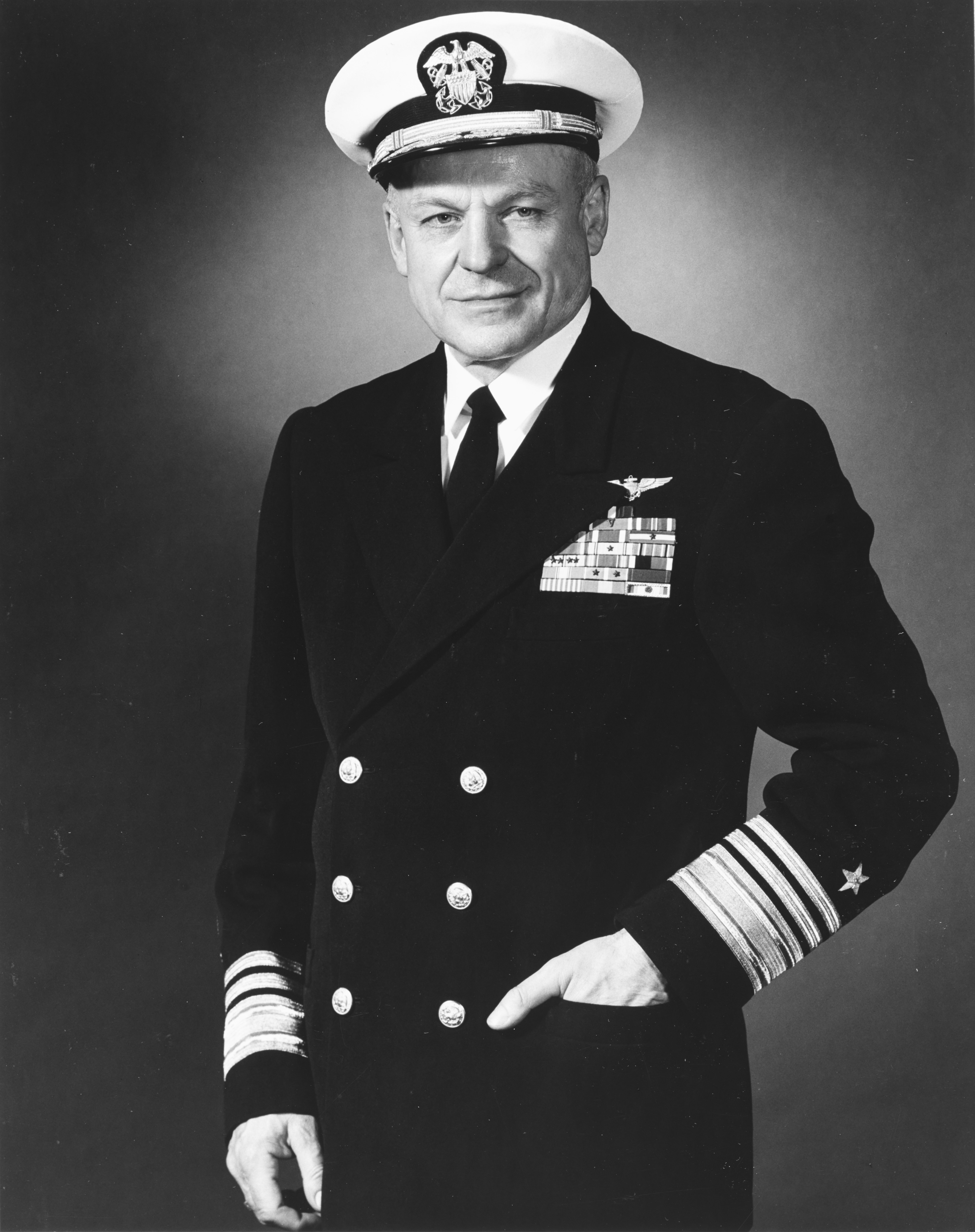
- Harry E. Sears in 1963
- Born: 22 August 1906; Beverly, Massachusetts
- Died: 29 January 1998 (aged 91) Bethesda, Maryland
- Allegiance: United States of America
- Branch: United States Navy
- Service years: 1928–1958
- Rank: Vice Admiral
- Commands: Carrier Division 14; USS Coral Sea; USS Siboney; VB-104
- Conflicts: World War II
- Awards: Navy Cross; Legion of Merit; Distinguished Flying Cross (2); Air Medal

Harry Edward Sears (22 August 1906 – 29 January 1998) was a United States Navy vice admiral. A decorated veteran of World War II, he earned the Navy Cross and two Distinguished Flying Crosses while leading a squadron of patrol bombers in the Pacific theatre.

== Early life and education ==
Born and raised in Beverly, Massachusetts, Sears was appointed to the United States Naval Academy in 1924. While there, he participated on the rowing team and in the academy choir. Sears graduated in 1928, and then, after completing flight training in Pensacola, Florida, was designated a naval aviator in 1930. He later attended George Washington University and the National War College.

== Military career ==
On 10 April 1943, Commander Sears was assigned to form a new squadron of patrol bombers at Kaneohe Bay, Hawaii. Flying the PB4Y-1 Liberator, VB-104 was formed using some of the personnel from VP-71. On 15 August 1943, the squadron was ordered to Carney Field on Guadalcanal to replace VB-101. Sears personally led low-level bombing and strafing missions against Japanese shipping in the region. On 6 February 1944, the squadron was relocated to Munda Field on New Georgia. Relieved by VB-115 on 29 March 1944, the squadron was rotated back to the U.S. mainland. Over their seven-month combat tour, the squadron was credited with sinking or damaging 51 enemy vessels and destroying or damaging 30 enemy aircraft. On 15 May 1944, Sears was replaced as squadron commander at Kearney Field in California.

Admiral William F. "Bull" Halsey selected Sears to fly first lady Eleanor Roosevelt on the last leg of her August 1943 tour of the South Pacific combat zone. He also had the opportunity to serve as personal pilot for Secretary of the Navy James V. Forrestal, Admiral Harold R. Stark and CNO Admiral Ernest J. King.

Sears commanded the escort carrier USS Siboney in 1950 and the carrier USS Coral Sea in 1954. Nominated for temporary promotion to rear admiral on 2 August 1954, he then commanded Carrier Division 14. His last assignment was a deputy commander-in-chief of Allied Forces in Southern Europe based at Naples.

Permanently promoted to rear admiral effective 1 January 1956, Sears was advanced to vice admiral when he retired from active duty on 1 August 1958. He was awarded the Order of Naval Merit, 3rd Class by the Spanish government for his NATO service.

== Personal ==
Sears was married to Gladys Mase Sears, but their marriage ended in divorce. They had three sons, one daughter, nine grandchildren and, as of 1998, seven great-grandchildren.

Sears remarried with Helen Melrose Sears and lived with her in Chevy Chase, Maryland after retirement. He died at the Bethesda Naval Hospital after suffering a stroke and was buried at Arlington National Cemetery on 11 February 1998.
