= 12 May Karachi riots =

Political riots

- Part of MQM violence
- Date: 12 May 2007
- Location: Karachi, Pakistan
- Caused by: Violent protests between pro-government activists and supporters of recently suspended chief justice Iftikhar Muhammad Chaudhry
- Methods: Political and ethnic riots

Parties
Pakistan Peoples Party; Awami National Party; Pashtunkhwa Milli Awami Party	Muttahida Qaumi Movement; Pakistan Muslim League (Q)

Lead figures
Benazir Bhutto; Asfandyar Wali Khan; Mahmood Khan Achakzai	Altaf Hussain

Casualties
- Deaths: 58
- Arrested: Waseem Akhtar

The 12 May Karachi riots, also known as Black Saturday riots, were a series of violent clashes between rival political activists in Karachi. The violence resulted in 58 deaths. The unrest began as the recently suspended chief justice of Pakistan Iftikhar Chaudhry arrived at the Jinnah International Airport on 12 May 2007. Gunfights and clashes erupted across the provincial capital as lawyers, Pakistan Peoples Party (PPP), Awami National Party (ANP), Pakistan Tehreek-e-Insaf (PTI), and Pashtunkhwa Milli Awami Party (PMAP) activists, who supported the judge, and the pro-government Muttahida Qaumi Movement (MQM) activists took to the streets against each other. Pakistan Muslim League Quaid-e-Azam (PMLQ) and MQM party workers, with support from military dictator Gen. Pervez Musharraf, were accused of launching highly coordinated attacks against lawyers, ANP, PTI, PPP activists and news channels, especially Aaj News. Government machinery was used to block all major roads. Police was accomplice and a silent spectator to the violence. News media was attacked at Guru Mandir (Business Recorder Road) when MQM activists began firing at Aaj News headquarters which was shown on live television. Most of the 58 killed were part of opposition parties supporting Chaudhry.

Chaudhry's supporters had announced a public rally to welcome the judge while at the same time, the MQM also announced a demonstration of their own to protest against the politicisation of the issue of the judge's suspension. The MQM made plans to deliberately converge at the mausoleum of Muhammad Ali Jinnah where the chief justice was to make an appearance to address a lawyers' convention and a bar association meeting at the 50th anniversary of the Sindh High Court Bar Association.

== Lawyers' Movement ==
Before the citywide riots escalated, several roads were cordoned off and all routes to the airport were blocked to avoid clashes between groups. In the carnage that ensued, armed groups did a lot of damage. Cars were burnt and buildings smashed into while the ensuing gunfights left more than 40 people killed with several hundred injured and arrested. The violence continued for several days, culminating in events that led to the historic Lawyers' Movement.

Several lawmakers and analysts have since questioned the incompetence of the city's security apparatus on the day of the riots and the complicity of MQM in giving rise to the riots. The MQM officially denied starting the chaos and blamed it on the PPP, ANP, PMAP, Punjabi Pakhtun Ittehad (PPI), and Pakistan Muslim League (N) (PML-N) activists.

== Background ==
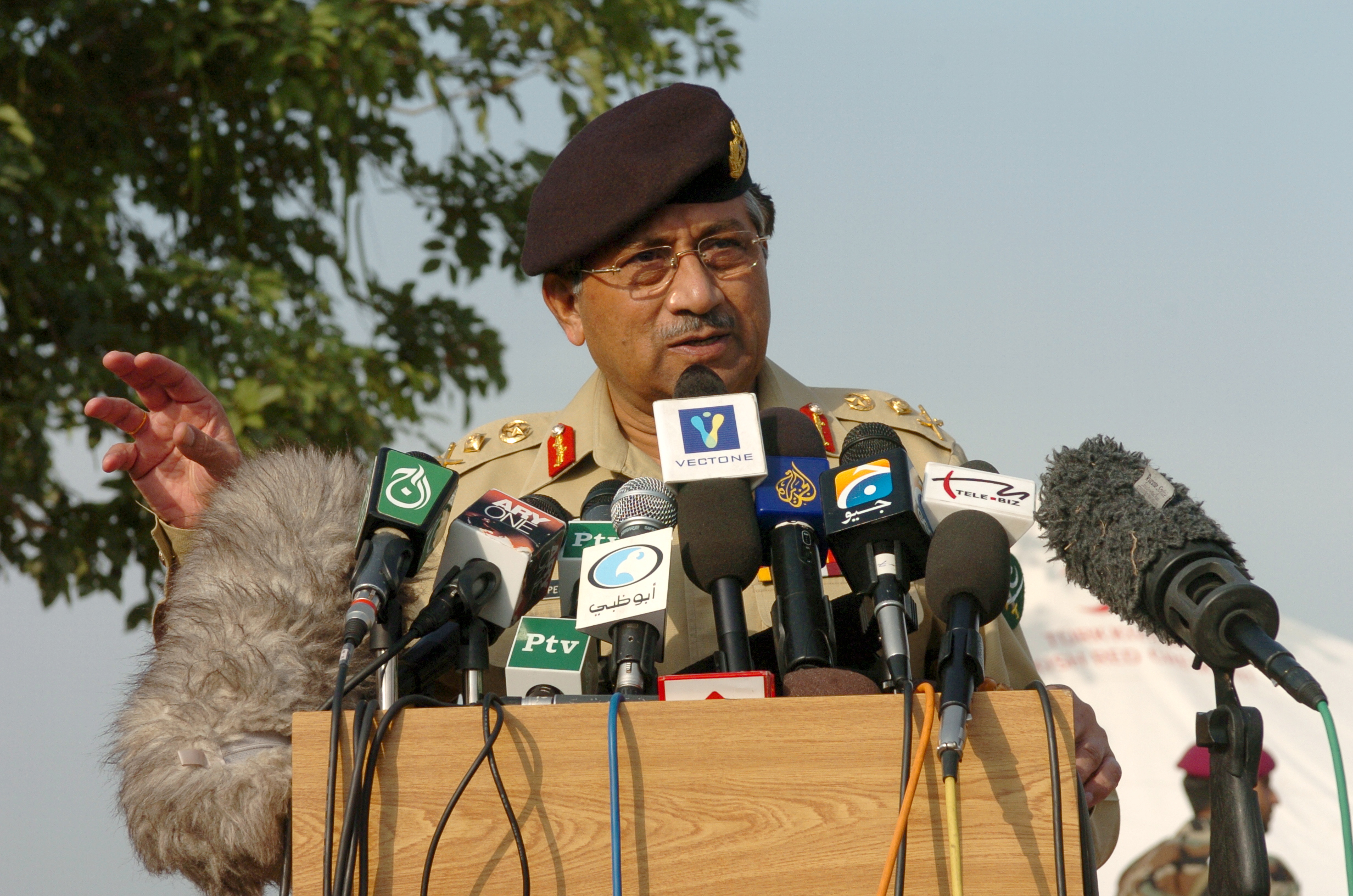
Iftikhar Chaudhry was widely expected to try and insist Musharraf (above) stand down as army chief. The judge had also taken on several other cases that upset the government for which he was suspended from his post as chief justice.

In the first few months of 2007, several conflicts had already raged between chief justice Iftikhar Muhammad Chaudhry and the Pakistani government, particularly with regard to the Pakistan Steel Mills corruption case where the chief justice ruled against the sale of the state-owned steel mills at a "throw-away price". Issues pertaining to the privatisation of the state-owned steel mills upset Shaukat Aziz, who served as the prime minister under the Musharraf administration.

What irked president Pervez Musharraf however was the controversial Missing Persons case that found Pakistan's intelligence agencies (including the FIA and the ISI) to be complicit in the forced disappearances of up to 400 people (including terror suspects and human rights activists) without due process since 2001. Under Chaudhry's leadership, the courts had increasingly started "exercising independence from the government" when it ordered the security agencies to produce the missing people in court.

When the Musharraf administration asked the judge to quit, Chaudhry refused to go. On 9 March 2007, Musharraf had no other choice but to suspend Chaudhry from his post for alleged and unspecified charges of misconduct and misuse of authority. The sacking of the head of the judiciary sparked bloody protests throughout Pakistan and "edged the country towards a constitutional crisis". The civil unrest grew with regards to the validity of the allegations as well as doubts as to whether Musharraf had the power to suspend the chief justice. It was on these grounds that Chaudhry waged a legal battle in the Supreme Court seeking his reinstatement. He called his suspension a "thinly veiled assault on the independence of judiciary in Pakistan".

=== Nationwide protests and media ban ===
On 5 May 2007, in showing solidarity with the former chief justice, a motorcade of Chaudhry's supporters rode with him from Islamabad to Lahore where he was expected to speak at the Lahore High Court Bar Association when this motorcade of over 2,000 vehicles was stopped by the police with baton charges and tear gas shelling. Debates concerning the day's events started being covered and discussed on the Pakistani news media.

The government wanted to limit the media coverage of Chaudhry's rallies and asked the Supreme Court to warn news networks that any "media coverage, discussion and analysis" that impeded legal procedures would be treated as contempt of court. The court issued a statement in which it said the news media, particularly Geo TV host Kamran Khan, had broadcast "sensational reporting aimed at scandalising and maligning the honourable judges of the Supreme Court". Khan defended his actions by saying he had no malicious intent. But when discussions of the Chaudhry's rallies persisted on television, the government decided to take drastic measures and abruptly pulled Geo TV and Aaj TV off air.

It wasn't until 9 May 2007 that the Pakistani government imposed a complete ban on the media from discussing the suspension of Chaudhry by Musharraf. Media outlets and journalists protested and responded to the ban saying that their goal was to cover, not contribute, to the controversy. The government, reluctantly, agreed to issue special passes for reporters and lawyers to attend the presidential reference filed against the chief justice. Several pro-government parties throughout Pakistan announced their own demonstrations to coincide with Chaudhry's rallies.

=== Chaudhry's visit to Lahore High Court ===
"Nations and states which are based on dictatorship instead of the supremacy of the constitution, the rule of law and protection of basic rights get destroyed."

— Iftikhar Muhammad Chaudhry, Lahore High Court, 6 May 2007.

In anticipation of the former chief justice's arrival in Lahore, the Lahore High Court was thronged by political activists of several political parties in the opposition including Pakistan Peoples Party (PPP), Pakistan Muslim League (N) (PML-N), Muttahida Majlis-e-Amal (MMA) and Pakistan Tehreek-e-Insaf (PTI), who had gathered to welcome the judge. When Chaudhry did arrive at the Lahore High Court, his motorcade was swamped by supporters showering his vehicle with rose petals and chanting "Go Musharraf, Go!" Banners denouncing Musharraf were hung all around the compound.

In his historical speech on 6 May 2007, the former chief justice made no direct references to president Musharraf but directed his rhetoric towards the government by calling it a "dictatorship". Several political commentators refer to this speech as the precursor to the Lawyers' Movement later that year. Chaudhry also accused the government of violating the basic human rights of its citizens and warned that the countries and nations that don't learn from past mistakes were bound to be destroyed. In closing his speech, Chaudhry announced he would be attending a Sindh High Court Bar Association meeting in Karachi on 12 May 2007.

=== Opposition plans to welcome Chaudhry ===
After Chaudhry announced his plans for Karachi, the political parties in the opposition announced a rally to welcome the former chief justice in their city. Upon seeing Chaudhry's supporters announce a rally to welcome the chief justice, the pro-government Muttahida Qaumi Movement (MQM) organised a protest demonstration of their own against the "politicisation of the issue [of the justice's suspension]".

Seeing the chief justice's determination to visit Karachi, MQM MNA Nawab Mirza proclaimed in a parliamentary session that "no one [would] be allowed to do anything in Karachi." He said that "[the] country [may belong] to everyone, but Karachi [belonged] to [the MQM]". The provincial government called a meeting of the senior officials and instructed them to not let the chief justice leave the airport at any cost. Sindh chief secretary Shakil Durrani learnt of these plans and called them a "contempt of the High Court's orders".

On 10 May 2007, Pakistan International Human Rights Organisation filed a petition with the Sindh High Court pointing out reports in the press about Sindh home secretary Ghulam M. Muhtaram Naqvi's letter to the chief justice that requested him to postpone his visit because of intelligence reports suggesting threat of a terrorist attack. The court directed the federal and provincial governments to provide fool-proof security to the chief justice and also directed authorities not to pressurise him into changing his route while also keeping him informed of any security risks.

=== Unrest before Chaudhry's visit ===
At 3 am on 10 May 2007, the residence of the Supreme Court Bar Association president Munir A. Malik came under attack by armed men. Malik, a member of the panel of lawyers defending Chaudhry, narrowly escaped the attack. On 11 May 2007, Karachi Bar Association vice president Ziauddin Sardar was reported missing by his family. Following these incidents, uncertainty and fear gripped the city as the "threat of a showdown loomed large".

Karachi Police informed it had arrested 150 people under the Maintenance of Public Order Ordinance on apprehensions they could "create problems" on the judge's arrival. However, opposition parties disputed the number of arrests – MMA put the figure at 500, PPP at 400 and PML-N at 150.

== The day of the riots ==
Fearing a showdown between rival political parties, the transporters in the city decided to keep their buses and vans off the road. In a late-night announcement, the Sindh government announced the closure of all educational institutions as governor Dr Ishrat-ul-Ibad Khan declared a public holiday for government and private schools, colleges and universities on 12 May 2007. Hospitals declared emergency and ordered their doctors and staff to remain on duty, while Naib Nazima Nasreen Jalil directed all city departments including hospitals and fire-brigade to follow "standard operating procedure" to deal with any emergency situation that arises.

=== City-wide blockades set up ===
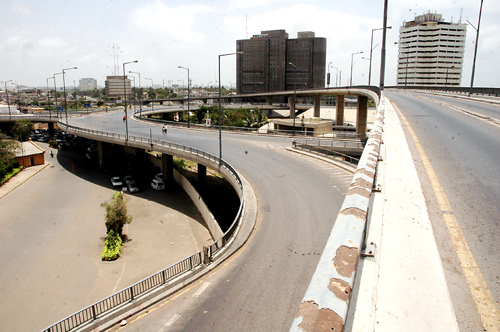
Streets throughout Karachi were left deserted on the day the riots broke out bringing the provincial capital to a halt.

Reports started emerging from around Karachi of blockades being set up on the way toward the Jinnah International Airport in a bid to stop the chief justice from visiting Muhammad Ali Jinnah's mausoleum. Parts of Shahrah-e-Quaideen were blocked whereas the main arterial road Shahrah-e-Faisal, which was to be used by procession of the chief justice, was completely made inaccessible.

Because most of the road leading to the airport were closed, the Pakistan International Airlines (PIA) had to delay all its flight due to the non-availability of cockpit and cabin crews who were unable to reach the airport in time. It wasn't just air traffic that was suspended but train services between Karachi and the rest of the country were also effected.

=== Chaudhry's arrival in Karachi ===
At 10 am, Chaudhry left Islamabad airport on flight PK-301 for Karachi accompanied by Zamurad Khan and Yousuf Talpur. The flight landed at the Jinnah International Airport in Karachi airport at 11:50 am.

Gunfights broke out throughout the city as soon as the plane landed at the airport; several vehicles were also set ablaze. Smoke rose from at least four different areas of the city where competing rallies were organised.

The chief justice had plans to visit Pakistan founder Muhammad Ali Jinnah's mausoleum to address a gathering and then to the Sindh High Court to address lawyers at the 50th anniversary of the Sindh High Court Bar Association. Due to the sudden violence that erupted throughout the city, the chief justice was unable to leave the airport.

=== Media offices attacked ===
As the violence escalated, gunfights moved toward the Guru Mandir Square in the neighbourhood of Jamshed Quarters. The offices of various media outlets, in particular the Business Recorder House which housed the Aaj TV newsroom and broadcast operations, became firsthand witnesses of the carnage. With the violence continuing right at their doorstep, Aaj TV reporters began telecasting live footage of the mayhem.

The Aaj TV footage showed armed men brandishing weapons that they fired indiscriminately at rivals in an adjacent neighbourhood. The footage clearly showed these gunmen hoisting MQM flags. As soon as the footage started airing on television, the gunmen became aware they were being filmed and turned their guns towards the media offices. The armed men fired at the office building and set cars ablaze in the parking lot beside the building.

The network's chief executive Arshad Zuberi later revealed that the gunmen were certainly affiliated with the MQM. He stated that the "gunmen started [firing] indiscriminately at [the] office [and] no security was sent [even] though the firing went on for six hours". According to Zuberi, the armed men had wanted to stop the airing of the live footage. Nevertheless, the network remained on air uninterrupted and no one was hurt during the attacks.

In an editorial for the Daily Times, freelance journalist Urooj Zia wrote an eyewitness account of the carnage outside the Business Recorder House. She observed how the Rangers paramilitary force had let the violence continue under their noses. She mentioned how people were being stopped at gunpoint on the street by political activists and asked for identification while the police stood by idly.

=== Violence, carnage and mayhem ===
During the rampage, it was mostly the supporters of Chaudhry who lost their lives. 15 members of Awami National Party (ANP) were killed (Pashtuns make up second largest ethnic group in Karachi with 7.0 million Pashtuns living in Karachi). 14 supporters of PPP were also left dead in the massacre.

More than 800 political workers were arrested, majority of whom were members of labor and student organizations that had been planning to greet Chaudhry on his arrival.

=== Government offers to transport Chaudhry ===
Unable to leave the airport, the chief justice took refuge at the airport. Knowing that roads leading up to the airport were blocked and that his leaving may further precipitate bloodshed, Chaudhry's advisers asked him to stay put. Amidst the chaos, the government agreed to send a helicopter to transport him out of the airport but Chaudhry refused, indicating that he wished to travel by ground.

According to Munir A. Malik, one of the lawyers accompanying Chaudhry, Musharraf's offer to transport Chaudhry by helicopter seemed more like an attempt to "kidnap" the chief justice.

=== Notice to deport the chief justice ===
After a whole day of violence in the city, the Sindh administration issued a notification in the evening ordering the deportation of the chief justice. It was at this moment that Chaudhry "abandoned plans to address [his] supporters" and returned to Islamabad on the next flight. The chief justice was adamant that he would only leave the airport if he was provided with sufficient security and the accompaniment of his cadre of lawyers. Chaudhry's flight departed the Karachi airport at around 9 pm.

According to Aitzaz Ahsan, a prominent figurehead in Chaudhry's cadre, the chief justice had waited all day for permission to go to the Sindh High Court but was rather mistreated and asked to leave. He also accused the MQM of planning the mayhem in advance.

== Sources of contention ==
Human Rights Watch, a non-government affiliated human rights watch dog based in New York City, issued a statement indicating that "This [violence] can either be due to the incompetence of the government, or its complicity." Their statement went on, "The sequence of events leading up to this violence, including statements from the provincial authorities and the arrest of hundreds of opposition activists in the last few days, indicates that the government, acting through its coalition partners, has deliberately sought to foment violence in Karachi."

According to documents obtained by the BBC after the event, government security measures on the day of the planned demonstrations included the instruction that "no police personnel should carry any kind of weapon during the law and order duty with the rally".

Of note, among police officials were deployed for security duties in Karachi, only 21 in the entire city were armed. BBC analysts have indicated that the way police were deployed indicates that they were meant to prevent people from gaining access to the airport or to the Sindh High Court.

== Aftermath ==
Most of the city remained calm the day following the riots as security forces in armored personnel carriers and pickup trucks with mounted machine guns patrolled mostly peaceful and deserted streets. Tensions were still high with the government authorising paramilitary troops to shoot anyone involved in "serious" violence. Political opponents in the parliament blamed one another for the 12 May mayhem. MQM's Farooq Sattar blamed the opposition by saying that they were a "hundred percent, 200 percent" responsible for the situation in Karachi.

On the other hand, opposition senator Mushahid Ullah Khan held the MQM responsible for the attacks in Karachi. National Party senator and senior vice president Hasil Bizenjo underscored the need for an inquiry into the incidents. An editorial in the Daily Times said, "the possibility of any compromise to correct [Musharraf's] original mistake [of removing the chief justice] has vanished now ... the ante has been upped by the government."

=== Killing of Syed Hammad Raza ===
At around 4:30 pm on 13 May 2007, Supreme Court additional registrar Syed Hammad Raza was shot dead near his home in Islamabad. Raza was a close associate of Chaudhry and a vital witness in the case against Chaudhry's suspension. After leaving Karachi, the chief justice visited Raza's widow Shabana the same night to present his condolences. Reuters reported Shabana telling Chaudhry, "You called him to Islamabad. You should have protected him, and now my children need protection as well." According to Chaudhry's lawyer Tariq Mehmood, Raza was a prime witness in the case as he had witnessed the removal of files from the chief justice's chambers on the day of his suspension. He said that "[Raza] was under pressure."

=== Nationwide protests ===
On 13 May 2007, opposition parties observed a "black day" and called for a general strike in Punjab on 14 May 2007. The leaders of PPP, PML-N, MMA, PTI, ANP, PMAP, and the Khaksar Tehrik called for action against the miscreants that spread violence on 12 May calling them "killers". The Punjab leadership of the MMA held the Sindh government responsible for the loss of lives. The 14 May strikes in Lahore paralysed the city as opposition activists protested against the government response to the riots. 8,000 people, including lawyers and human rights activists, chanted "Out with Musharraf!" and "Death to Altaf Hussain!" In addition, protestors burned effigies of Musharraf and hundreds forced their way through a police barricade.

Authorities responded by banning demonstrations and declaring a national holiday. Shops were closed and public transportation was shut down in the country's major cities. It is the largest strike in Pakistan since Musharraf assumed his presidency in 1999, with much of the unrest stemming from news reports that government troops were in Karachi.

=== Arrest of Rana Saleemullah Khan ===
At a press conference on 14 May 2007, Sindh chief minister Dr. Arbab Ghulam Rahim assured that the situation in Karachi was under control and that there had been no serious incidents of violence in the days following the initial 12 May riots, despite fears to the contrary. The chief minister also indicated that opposition parties had not sought permission from the provincial government to hold their rallies on 12 May 2007. He also said the general elections would be held as scheduled in a few months and accused the opposition of showing impatience in that regard.

Rahim also revealed that the police had arrested former DIG Rana Saleemullah Khan on court orders. Khan had been a vocal advocate of the chief justice and was Chaudhry's witness with regards to the Mannu Bheel case. He was one of the two witnesses in that case, alongside the recently killed Syed Hammad Raza. Khan feared that his arrest was a façade and a sham, and that he could become another victim of extrajudicial killing. There had been several reports that Khan was humiliated after his arrest.

=== Abduction of Iqbal Kazmi ===
On 3 June 2007, the government announced that it would impose a ban on any televised live talk show that discusses the issue of the chief justice's suspension. It threatened to take punitive action against broadcasters that displayed an anti-state or anti-national stance and cast "aspersions on the integrity of the armed forces". Under Musharraf's decree, the government amended the PEMRA Ordinance to impose these new restrictions on private television channels on 4 June 2007. Opposition parties and lawyers campaigned against these amendments and observed a "black day" in solidarity with the broadcasters and journalists. Amongst the petitioners was the civil rights activist Syed Mohammad Iqbal Kazmi who had recently filed a petition in the Sindh High Court on 12 May violence.

Kazmi was abducted by unidentified persons on 6 June 2007 after he had filed his petition against the PEMRA ordinance. He was later released by his abductors on the condition that he would leave Karachi along with his family. However upon his release, Kazmi revealed that the reason for his abduction was rather his petition on the 12 May violence. He told of his harrowing ordeal where he was quizzed about his association with Imran Khan's PTI and the reasons as to why he named MQM founder and chief Altaf Hussain in his petition. His petition had also included the names of several other major political and government figures as respondents alongside Hussain. The named respondents included Sindh chief minister Arbab Ghulam Rahim, federal interior secretary Syed Kamal Shah, adviser to Sindh CM on home affairs Waseem Akhtar, chief secretary Shakeel Durrani, home secretary Ghulam M. Muhtaram Naqvi, provincial police officer Niaz A. Siddiqui, CCPO Azhar A. Farooqui, and the SHOs of City Courts and Jamshed Quarters police stations.

== Formal inquisition ==
Alongside Kazmi's petition, the Sindh High Court initiated its own suo moto proceedings issuing contempt of court notices to the federal interior secretary, Sindh chief secretary and home secretary, AIGP (acting PPO), Town Police Officer and other officials who were responsible for maintaining law and order on 12 May 2007. Subsequently, the Human Rights Commission of Pakistan (HRCP) also moved an identical contempt of court application.

A seven-member bench was constituted to preside over the case. The bench included justices Sarmad Jalal Osmany, Anwar Zaheer Jamali, Mushir Alam, Azizullah M. Memon, Khilji Arif Hussain, Maqbool Baqar, and Ali Sain Dino Metlo, who were authorised to probe into the several issues that resulted in the 12 May bloodshed. No main culprit in this case was ever arrested.

== See also ==
- Iftikhar Muhammad Chaudhry
- Awami National Party
- Muttahida Qaumi Movement
- Pervez Musharraf
- Altaf Hussain
- Jinnah International Airport
- Aaj Television Network
- Pakistan Peoples Party
- 2019 Ghotki riots
- MQM Militancy
