= List of Consolidated B-24 Liberator operators =

The List of Consolidated B-24 Liberator operators, both the B-24 Liberator and PB4Y Privateer are listed and include the nation and service branch:

== B-24 Liberator operators ==
=== Military operators ===
==== Australia ====
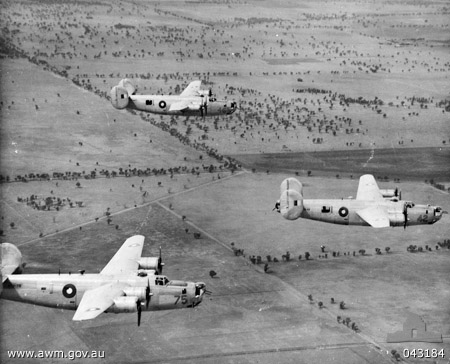
Three No. 7 Operational Training Unit Liberators

Royal Australian Air Force

Due to the vast numbers of Liberator aircraft available in 1943 it was decided the Royal Australian Air Force (RAAF) should form up to seven squadrons of Liberator heavy bombers. This would also allow USAAF Bombardment Groups to move from Australia to other areas. As RAAF Squadrons Nos 21, 23 and 24 equipped with Vultee Vengeance dive-bombers had just returned from New Guinea it was decided they should be the first ones to be re-equipped. RAAF aircrews were trained and flew operationally with the USAAF until RAAF Liberators were received in February 1944. The first nine new bombers formed Operational Training Unit No 7.

Unplanned delivery delays meant that Squadrons were not operational until 1945, when they began operations from its base in the Northern Territory forming RAAF Bomber Wing No. 82 .They played a very active role in the heavy bombing role during the last months of the war, particularly in the Borneo campaign. Other RAAF Bomber squadron used the Liberator.

In addition, Nos 200 and 201 Flights flew the Liberator under the direction of the Australian Intelligence Bureau.

- 200 flight was equipped with 8 B-24s and their operations included dropping “Z-Force” special forces behind enemy lines.
- 210 flight operated 2 B-24s from Darwin in the Northern Territory conducting electronic countermeasures against Japanese radar and radio communications.

At the war's end most B-24's were no longer required and were scrapped for their metal which was then melted down for more urgent use. After the war Liberators were replaced in 1948 by Avro Lincolns. About 287 Liberators (B-24D, B-24J, B-24L and the B-24M models) eventually served in RAAF bomber squadrons. It was the only heavy bomber used in the Pacific by the RAAF and they operated from Australia, Morotai(East Indies) and Palawan (Philippines).

Australia/South West Pacific

- Governor-General's Flight RAAF (as a VIP transport)
- No. 12 Squadron RAAF
- No. 21 Squadron RAAF
- No. 23 Squadron RAAF
- No. 24 Squadron RAAF
- No. 25 Squadron RAAF
- No. 99 Squadron RAAF
- No. 102 Squadron RAAF
- No. 7 Operational Training Unit RAAF
- No. 200 Flight RAAF (controlled by the Allied Intelligence Bureau)
- No. 201 Flight RAAF
- No. 1 Communication Unit RAAF (as a VIP transport)

Europe

- No. 10 Squadron RAAF/No. 466 Squadron RAAF (A joint or merged unit – sources vary; began converting to Liberators in mid-1945 after the surrender of Germany, prior to transfer to the Pacific; disbanded in October 1945 after the surrender of Japan.)

==== Canada ====
RCAF operated four Liberator anti-submarine squadrons, one heavy transport squadron and one bomber squadron during the Second World War.

- No. 10 Squadron RCAF
- No. 11 Squadron RCAF Bomber Reconnaissance Squadron, RCAF
- No. 168 Heavy Transport Squadron, RCAF
- No. 5 OTU, BCATP Boundary Bay British Columbia and Abbotsford, British Columbia

==== China ====
A total of 138 B-24 Liberator were sold to China under Lend-Lease in 1944–45 but only 37 B-24M had been actually received at the end of the war. About 48 B-24M were eventually received and were used in China Civil War.

==== People's Republic of China ====
Two B-24M were captured in China Civil War and operated until 1952.

==== Czechoslovakia ====
Czechoslovak Squadrons in RAF

- No 311 (Czechoslovak) Squadron

==== Germany ====
Luftwaffe

- KG 200 unit operated several captured B-24 for clandestine missions.

==== India ====
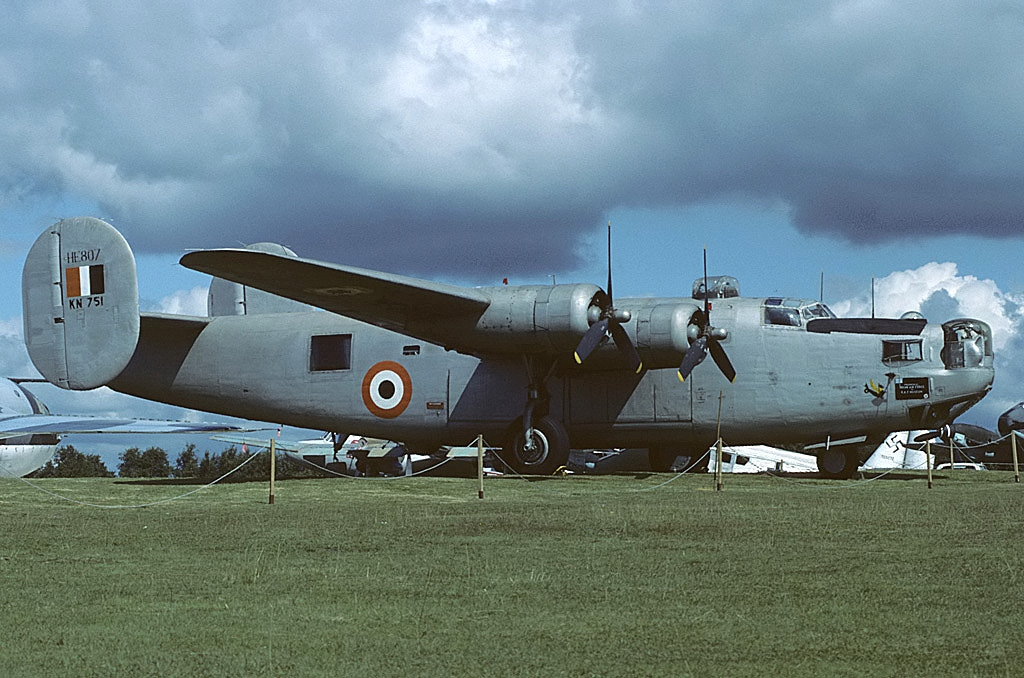
Consolidated B-24L Liberator

When India gained independence in 1947, between 37 and 42 Liberators were resurrected by HAL and gave service with No.5, No.6 and No.16 Squadrons. until their retirement in 1968. It is from the Indian Air Force that the majority of the remaining B-24s owe their existence.

A major gap for the Indian Air Force during the Kashmir conflict was the lack of heavy bombers. Following the Second World War, the RAF had been forced to dispose of a number of Consolidated B-24 Liberators in India which it had received from the United States under the terms of the Lend-Lease agreement. These Liberators were sent to Kanpur, where they were damaged by RAF personnel in a variety of ways, rendering them unusable. However, the RIAF, which had for years relied on salvage and repair operations to keep its equipment-starved squadrons operating, was able to repair the Liberators. Some 42 Liberators were made air-worthy using spare parts cannibalized from other Liberators.

The IAF became the last air force in the world to fly the Liberator, retiring the type in 1968. Afterwards, the RAF Museum in the UK enquired about the possibility of acquiring, for its collection, an ex-IAF Liberator. In 1974, one of the Liberators was flown from India to England; it was later installed at the museum on permanent display.

==== Italy ====
Regia Aeronautica

- A single USAAF B-24D (serial 41-23659) was captured by the Regia Aeronautica after landing in Pachino, Sicily February 1943. After evaluation at the Italian test centre at Guidonia, it was delivered to the Luftwaffe test centre at Rechlin in June.

==== Nicaragua ====
Nicaraguan Air Force

- Two ex USAAF B-24D were operated by the FAN in the 1950s. Later sold to US Warbird collectors in the early 60s.

==== Netherlands ====
No. 321 Squadron RAF was formed from Dutch personnel of the Royal Netherlands Naval Air Service during World War II. After the Japanese Surrender, the squadron passed to the control of the Dutch Naval Aviation Service. It flew the B-24 Liberator between December 1944 and December 1945.

==== Poland ====
Polish Air Forces in exile

- No. 301 Polish Bomber Squadron

==== Portugal ====
Six B-24 Liberator of various variants were interned during World War II after landing in Portugal due to many reasons. All six of these aircraft were operated by the Aeronáutica Militar (Army Military Aviation).

==== Romania ====
One B-24 was captured largely intact after Operation Tidal Wave in 1943. It was tested by the Royal Romanian Air Force during the winter. Another two B-24s were captured after the raid of 5 April 1944. There were plans to form a squadron because of the large number of force-landed or crashed B-24s during the summer of 1944, but only three B-24Ds and one B-24J were made airworthy before King Michael's Coup. The plan was canceled after this event.

==== Soviet Union ====
Only one plane was delivered via Lend-lease but 30 other planes were repaired from 73 abandoned wrecks.

==== South Africa ====
- 31 Squadron SAAF
- 34 Squadron SAAF

==== Turkey ====
Eleven B-24s made an emergency landing in Turkey coming from bombing of Ploesti within Operation Tidal Wave. All of them were interned by Turkey and five of these B-24s were repaired and served in the Turkish Air Force.

==== United Kingdom ====
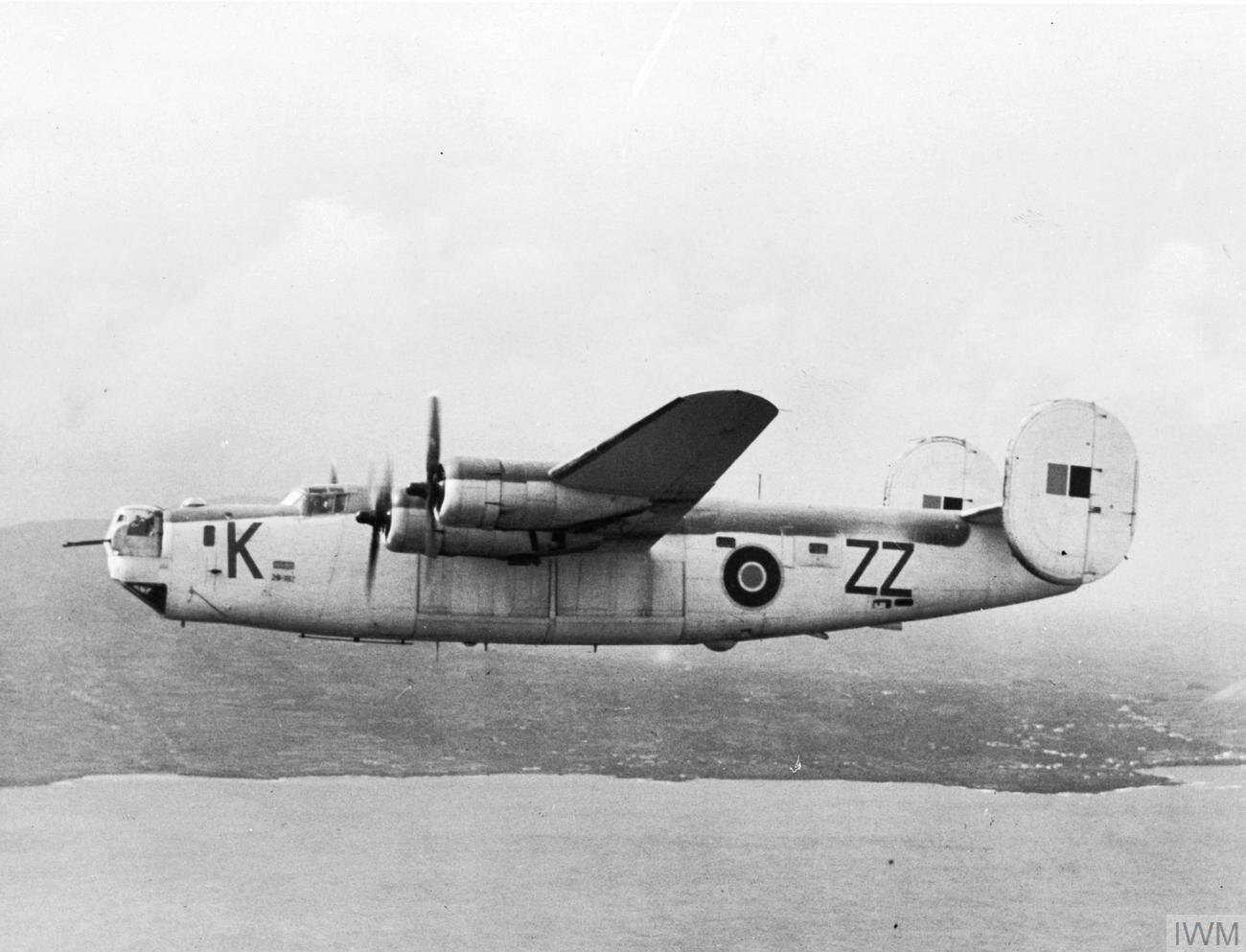
Allied Aircraft: Consolidated Liberator GR Mk VI, KG869 'ZZ-K', of No. 220 Squadron Royal Air Force

The RAF was the first user as initial deliveries of B-24 Liberators to Royal Air Force were made in early 1941 and included some planes originally intended for France. These 26 planes were named Liberator B.Mk I and were basically B-24As. The RAF soon realized that B-24s were unsuitable for combat over Western Europe as they had insufficient defensive armament and lacked self-sealing fuel tanks. Due to the aircraft's heavy payload and long range, the disappointed RAF assigned 20 LB-30B aircraft to anti-submarine patrols and 6 LB-30A to long range transport operations, specifically the Atlantic Return Ferry Service. By March 1941 200 B-24s were in service in the RAF, the ones assigned to Coastal Command were in many cases converted to a version with greatly increased range, wherein armor, and sometimes even turrets, were removed to compensate for installing additional fuel tanks.

The next RAF version was the improved Liberator B.Mk II, received starting in January 1942, and were closer to the B-24C. These planes were fitted with self-sealing fuel tanks and two four-gun Boulton-Paul turrets, one in the tail and another in a dorsal position. Some Mk.IIs went to Coastal Command but most were operationally accepted by RAF in the heavy bomber role. When the situation became dangerous to British interests, some B-24s were assigned to the Middle East in 1942 and based in the Suez Canal Zone. They arrived about the same time as a big convoy was being organized to ferry supplies from Alexandria to Malta, and their first task was to help provide it with air cover. Middle East based B-24s proved their value in August 1942, joining the air raids on Tobruk harbor, compelling the German Army to divert most supply columns to Benghazi. In September USAAF and RAF B-24s started bombing Benghazi scoring several direct hits on supply ships.

The next British version was the Liberator B.Mk III, basically an adapted B-24D. Their armament was adapted to RAF standards, consisting of a single British machine gun in the nose, a twin-gun dorsal turret, two waist gun positions and a four-gun tail turret. Some retained US armament, being named Liberator B.Mk IIIA.

Liberator B.Mk V were B-24D aircraft modified to carry more fuel, reducing its armor but retaining the defensive armament of the Liberator B.Mk III model. The Liberator B.Mk VI were B-24G/H/H with Boulton Paul tail turrets. B-24J version was named Liberator B.Mk VIII.

RAF Coastal Command modified several B-24s for the anti-submarine role adding, an underwing searchlight, radar, and air-to-surface rockets. Coastal Command also used the Liberator Mk VI for long-range reconnaissance and the Liberator Mk VIII in the anti-submarine role.

Six RAF Liberator bomber squadrons also fought in Burma. No. 358 Squadron flew only one bombing mission, afterwards becoming a 'special duties' squadron. Together with three American Liberator squadrons they formed the Strategic Air Force of Eastern Air Command, and all were based in Eastern India. Burma-Siam railway was one of the main targets. In Europe B-24s were not employed by RAF for strategic bombing but some B-24s were used as electronic warfare aircraft. Flying in ahead of bombing formations, these aircraft jammed German ground and night fighter radars.

The RAF also used many B-24s in the transport role, using a letter C in the name:

- Liberator C.Mk IV were Mk VIII models modified as transports
- Liberator C.Mk VII was the designation for American C-87.
- Liberator C.Mk IX was the name for RY-3/C-87C versions.
- Liberator C.Mk VIII models were Mk VIII modified as transports.

Royal Air Force

- No. 8 Squadron RAF (post war Coastal Command, India)
- No. 37 Squadron RAF (Middle East)
- No. 38 Squadron RAF (Middle East)
- No. 40 Squadron RAF (Middle East)
- No. 53 Squadron RAF (Coastal Command)
- No. 59 Squadron RAF (Coastal Command)
- No. 70 Squadron RAF (Middle East)
- No. 86 Squadron RAF (Coastal Command)
- No. 99 Squadron RAF (Far East)
- No. 102 (Ceylon) Squadron RAF (Transport Command, post war)
- No. 104 Squadron RAF (Middle East)
- No. 108 Squadron RAF (Middle East)
- No. 120 Squadron RAF (Coastal Command)
- No. 147 Squadron RAF (Middle East)
- No. 148 Squadron RAF (Middle East)
- No. 149 (East India) Squadron RAF (Middle East)
- No. 159 Squadron RAF (Middle East, Far East)
- No. 160 Squadron RAF (Middle East, Far East)
- No. 178 Squadron RAF (Middle East)
- No. 200 Squadron RAF (Coastal Command out of Gambia)
- No. 203 Squadron RAF (Far East)
- No. 206 Squadron RAF (Coastal Command)
- No. 215 Squadron RAF (Far East)
- No. 220 Squadron RAF (Coastal Command)
- No. 223 Squadron RAF (Bomber Command, 1944/45)
- No. 224 Squadron RAF (Coastal Command)
- No. 231 Squadron RAF (Far East)
- No. 232 Squadron RAF (Transport Command)
- No. 233 Squadron RAF (Coastal Command)
- No. 243 Squadron RAF (Far East)
- No. 246 Squadron RAF (Transport Command)
- No. 321 (Netherlands) Squadron RAF (Far East)
- No. 354 Squadron RAF (Far East)
- No. 355 Squadron RAF (Far East)
- No. 356 Squadron RAF (Far East)
- No. 357 Squadron RAF (Far East)
- No. 358 Squadron RAF (Far East)
- No. 502 (Ulster) Squadron RAF (Coastal Command)
- No. 547 Squadron RAF (Coastal Command)
- No. 614 (County of Glamorgan) Squadron AAF (Middle East)

==== United States ====
United States Army Air Forces
see: B-24 Liberator Units of the United States Army Air Forces

The Liberator in North Africa campaign proved to be a better long-range bomber than the B-17 Flying Fortresses. With the B-17 the B-24 proved critical for the US 8th Air Force and its bombing raids across Europe. Later B-24s equipped 9th and 15th Air Forces in the Mediterranean.

B-24 Liberators operating in the Pacific proved the value of the long range capability of the B-24, surpassing that of the B-17. Not facing the deadly German defensive combination of anti-aircraft defenses and fighters, they achieved better results with the different demands imposed on them. In contrast to their European performance, where General Doolittle refused to take on more B-24's in favor of B-17's for the 8th Air Force, they assisted in returning control of the various collection of Pacific islands back to Allied hands.

United States Navy

Several different versions of the B-24 Liberator served with the United States Navy.

- PB4Y-1 was based on the B-24D. PB4Y-1 name covers also all other G-, J-, L- and M versions in USN service.
- PB4Y-P was a photographic reconnaissance variant based on the PB4Y-1.
- The C-87 transport version became the RY-1 (C-87A) and the RY-2 (C-87 base)
- The PB4Y-2 "Privateer" was a true US Navy developed version. It was based on B-24K design but fitted the tail section of Douglas B-32 Dragon with its single vertical tail fin for improved stability. The US Navy did not retire this version from service until 1954.
- RY-3 was a transport version of the PB4Y-2 "Privateer".

Navy units flying this type:

- VB-101
- VB-102
- VB-103
- VB-104
- VB-105
- VB-106
- VB-107
- VB-108
- VB-109
- VB-110
- VB-111
- VB-112
- VB-113
- VB-114
- VB-115
- VB-116
- VB-117
- VB-119
- VB-138
- VB-140
- VB-143
- VD-2
- VD-5
- VPB-100
- VPB-121
- VPB-197

== PB4Y Privateer operators ==
=== Military operators ===
==== Canada ====
- Royal Canadian Air Force

==== Republic of China ====
- Republic of China Air Force

==== France ====
- Aviation Navale

==== Honduras ====
- Honduran Air Force

==== United States ====
United States Navy

- Atlantic Squadrons
  - VPB-103
  - VP-107
  - VPB-110
  - VPB-111
  - VPB-112
  - VPB-114
  - VPB-163
- Pacific Squadrons
  - VD-1
  - VD-3
  - VD-4
  - VD-5
  - VP-106
  - VP-123
  - VPB-102
  - VPB-104
  - VPB-108
  - VPB-115
  - VPB-116
  - VPB-117
  - VPB-118
  - VPB-119
  - VPB-120
  - VPB-121
  - VPB-123
  - VPB-124
  - VPB-200
  - VP-ML-7

United States Marine Corps Aviation
United States Coast Guard

=== Civil operators ===
==== United States ====
- Hawkins & Powers Aviation used PB4Y Privateers converted for fire fighting.

==== Paraguay ====
- Alas Guaraníes S.A. used one PB4Y Privateer converted as a cargo plane.

== LB-30 Civil operators ==
Australia

- Qantas Empire Airways

France

- Ste Alpes Maritime

Greece

- Hellenic Airlines

Morocco

- ACANA

United Kingdom

- British Overseas Airways Corporation
- Scottish Aviation Limited

South Vietnam

== See also ==
- Consolidated B-24 Liberator
- Consolidated C-87 Liberator Express
- Consolidated Liberator I
- Consolidated PB4Y Privateer
- Consolidated PB4Y-2 Privateer
- Consolidated R2Y Liberator Liner
- Consolidated XB-24
- Consolidated XB-41 Liberator
