= VP-25 (1943–1950) =

Patrol Squadron 25
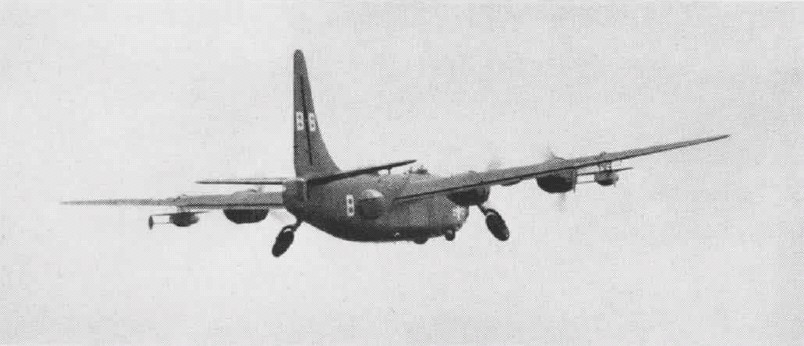
- VP-25 PB4Y-2B carrying two Bat (guided bomb)s in 1950
- Active: 1 October 1943 – 1 January 1950
- Country: United States of America
- Branch: United States Navy
- Type: squadron
- Role: Maritime patrol
- Nickname(s): Bulldogs
- Engagements: World War II

Aircraft flown
- Patrol: PB4Y-1; PB4Y-2/2B

VP-25 was a Patrol Squadron of the U.S. Navy. The squadron was established as Bombing Squadron 115 (VB-115) on 1 October 1943, redesignated Patrol Bombing Squadron 115 (VPB-115) on 1 October 1944, redesignated Patrol Squadron 115 (VP-115) on 15 May 1946, redesignated Heavy Patrol Squadron (Landplane) 13 (VP-HL-13) on 15 November 1946, redesignated Patrol Squadron 25 (VP-25) on 1 September 1948 and disestablished on 1 January 1950. It was the third squadron to be designated VP-25, the first VP-25 was redesignated VP-23 on 1 August 1941 and the second VP-25 was disestablished on 28 June 1946.

== Operational history ==
- 1 October 1943: VB-115 was established as a heavy bomber squadron at NAS San Diego, California, flying the PB4Y-1 Liberator. The squadron came under FAW-14 during its fitting out and initial training phase.
- 1 December 1943 – 17 January 1944: The squadron was relocated to NAAS Camp Kearney, California, for the completion of its training prior to its trans-Pacific flight to Hawaii. On 2 January 1944, the advance team of one officer and 60 enlisted personnel departed San Diego aboard USS Guadalcanal for NAS Kaneohe Bay, Hawaii. The squadron followed by sections, beginning the trans-Pacific flight on 17 January 1944. Shortly after the squadron's arrival, administrative control was transferred to FAW-2 from FAW-14. Combat operational training and search patrols in the vicinity of the Hawaiian Islands began on this date.
- 25–27 March 1944: VB-115 was transferred to the combat zone, departing for Munda, New Georgia, by sections. Combat operations and daily searches commenced from Munda on 27 March under the operational control of FAW-1.
- 10 April 1944: The squadron relocated to Green Island. Daily searches were conducted as required. Several attacks were conducted on enemy airfields located on Alet Island, Puluwat Group and Satawan Island. Antishipping strikes took place where opportunities presented themselves.
- 26 May 1944: VB-115 relocated to Mokerang Airfield, Los Negros Island, Admiralties. Dumbo (air-sea rescue) patrols were conducted in conjunction with VB-106 under TU 73.1.3. On 27 May an advanced detachment was sent to Wakde Island to conduct searches of the northern coastline of Dutch New Guinea toward the Philippines. On this date, the operational control of the squadron was placed under the Fifth Air Force, designated TU 73.2.3.
- 15 Jul 1944: The squadron headquarters and remaining aircraft were transferred to Owi Airfield. Long-range searches commenced upon arrival, remaining under the operational control of the 5th Air Force.
- 16–18 October 1944: VPB-115 was tasked with search sectors extending to the inland Philippine Sea in conjunction with the landing operations at Leyte. To facilitate the searches, a detachment was located on Morotai Island. By the end of October, all squadron elements had relocated to Morotai to await orders for return to the U.S.
- 29 October 1944: Lieutenant (jg) Paul R. Barker and his crew sank the Itsukushima Maru, a tanker of 10,006 tons in Marundu Bay, North Borneo, this was the largest enemy ship ever destroyed by a land-based aircraft in the Pacific theater.
- 8 November 1944: VPB-115 departed Morotai for NAS Kaneohe Bay en route to the West Coast. The last aircraft departed from Kaneohe for the U.S. on 30 November 1944.
- 30 April 1945: VPB-115 reformed and commenced training at NAS Whidbey Island, Washington, under the operational control of FAW-6.
- 1 June – 30 July 1945: The squadron was relocated to NAAS Crows Landing, California, for familiarization training in the PB4Y-2 Privateer.
- 11 August 1945: The squadron commenced its trans-Pacific flight to NAS Kaneohe Bay and began a period of training under the operational control of FAW-2.
- 15 May 1946: VPB-115 was redesignated VP-115, under the operational control of FAW-2 at NAS Kaneohe Bay.
- 15 November 1946: VP-115 was redesignated VP-HL-13. A new mission as an ASM-N-2 Bat missile squadron was assigned to the squadron along with the redesignation. The squadron received new aircraft, the PB4Y-2B, refitted with under-wing bomb release points for the device. During the war the Bat was carried by three squadrons, VPBs 109, 123 and 124. Only VPB-109 had any success with the missile, sinking three ships and destroying a large oil tank. The project languished briefly after the war until two squadrons were selected to be designated Bat squadrons, VP-24 in the Atlantic Fleet and VP-25 in the Pacific.
- 1 January 1950: By 1950, the ASM-N-2 Bat glide bomb was obsolete. Extreme budget cuts in Fiscal Year 1950 made the squadron a prime target for cutbacks, and it was disestablished 1 January 1950.

== Aircraft assignments ==
The squadron was assigned the following aircraft, effective on the dates shown:

- PB4Y-1 - October 1943
- PB4Y-2 - June 1945
- PB4Y-2B - November 1946

== Home port assignments ==
The squadron was assigned to these home ports, effective on the dates shown:

- NAS San Diego, California - 1 October 1943
- NAAS Camp Kearney, California - 1 December 1943
- NAS Kaneohe Bay, Hawaii - 17 January 1944
- NAS Whidbey Island, Washington - 30 April 1945
- NAAS Crows Landing, California - 1 June 1945
- NAS Kaneohe Bay - 11 August 1945
- NAS Barbers Point, Hawaii - 30 March 1949

== See also ==
- Maritime patrol aircraft
- List of inactive United States Navy aircraft squadrons
- List of United States Navy aircraft squadrons
- List of squadrons in the Dictionary of American Naval Aviation Squadrons
- History of the United States Navy
