= VP-28 =

Patrol Squadron 28
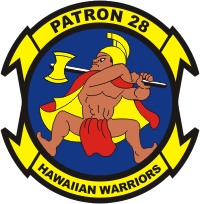
- Active: 1 July 1943 – 1 October 1969
- Country: United States of America
- Branch: United States Navy
- Type: squadron
- Role: Maritime patrol
- Nickname: Hawaiian Warriors
- Engagements: World War II; Korean War; Vietnam War

Aircraft flown
- Patrol: PB4Y-1; PB4Y-2/2S; P2V-5/SP-2H; P-3A

VP-28 was a Patrol Squadron of the U.S. Navy. The squadron was established as Bombing Squadron 108 (VB-108) on 1 July 1943, redesignated Patrol Bombing Squadron 108 (VPB-108) on 1 October 1944, redesignated Patrol Squadron 108 (VP-108) on 15 May 1946, redesignated Heavy Patrol Squadron (Landplane) 8 (VP-HL-8) on 15 November 1946, redesignated Patrol Squadron 28 (VP-28) on 1 September 1948 and disestablished on 1 October 1969. It was the second squadron to be designated VP-28, the first VP-28 had that designation in 1944 and 1946.

== Operational history ==
- 1 July 1943: VB-108 was established at NAS San Diego, California, with an initial "on paper" complement of 12 PB4Y-1 aircraft. Within a few days, the squadron was relocated to NAAS Camp Kearney, California, where it received an increase to 15 aircraft, with 57 officers and 148 enlisted personnel organized into 18 flight crews. During the training period the squadron came under the operational control of FAW-14.
- 3 October 1943: With its training completed in late September 1943, the squadron began preparations for its trans-Pacific flight to NAS Kaneohe Bay, Hawaii. The first aircraft departed on 2 October 1943, with all arriving safely at Kaneohe on the 3rd. Routine patrols and combat training commenced immediately. The squadron came under the operational control of FAW-2.
- 23 October 1943: Nine of the squadron's 15 aircraft were flown to Kanton Island to provide an escort cover for photographic planes of VD-3. This was unusual as the PB4Y-1 aircraft previously had lacked nose turrets and could not have provided the firepower to protect themselves. All of the early Liberators received for Navy use were Army versions (B-24D) without a powered nose turret. Reports from the combat zone showed that Liberator squadrons with 30-caliber nose guns sustained very high casualty rates. PB4Y-1 Liberators destined for Navy use did not get the refit with the ERCO 250 SH-1 powered turrets with twin 50-caliber gun mounts until after May 1943. Retrofits with the new turrets were completed at Litchfield Park, Arizona. VB-108 was among the first group of squadrons to be equipped with the newer, more heavily armed aircraft.
- 4 November 1943: The Kanton detachment flew its first combat mission against light opposition over the enemy-held Mili Atoll.
- 11 November 1943: VB-108 was relocated to Nukufetau Airfield, Ellice Islands. Its primary mission was reconnaissance of enemy-held territories, with authorization to attack any targets of opportunity. Generally, six missions were flown each day with photographic coverage of the designated patrol sectors.
- 3 December 1943: Lieutenant Ackerman, flying "Pistol Packing Mama," returned to Mili at wave-top height catching the enemy gunners by surprise. He strafed the runway and aircraft revetments before turning his attention to the harbor. There he located and sank an enemy transport and headed for home. On departure from Mili "Pistol Packing Mama" was attacked by six fighters. Lieutenant Ackerman and his crew fought off the enemy aircraft, possibly shooting down two and damaging a third. This form of low-level attack was to become the specialty of VB-108 throughout the central Pacific. It featured approach at no more than 25-foot (7.6 m) above the wave tops, then a "pop up" to 150-foot (46 m) for precise dropping of bombs, all the while blasting at every target and enemy gun site. Surprise was the key element to success, and the fact that the squadron suffered few casualties proved the utility of the tactic.
- 6 December 1943: Lieutenant Daley and crew strafed the length of Jaluit Atoll sinking a landing barge filled with Japanese sailors, and exploding two Depth charges on top of a Kawanishi H8K seaplane. Later, several squadron aircraft led by their commanding officer, Lieutenant Commander Renfro, bombed and strafed Jaluit, sinking two ships and damaging two others.
- 12 December 1943: Lieutenant John H. Stickell and his crew conducted a solo raid on the enemy facilities at Jaluit. Although the aircraft arrived over the atoll at tree top level, the Japanese defenders were not caught off guard. Lieutenant Stickell flew through heavy anti-aircraft fire to reach the buildings inland, dropping his bombs squarely on target. During the attack a machine gun bullet hit Stickell. Despite a severe wound, he flew his aircraft safely out of the target area. He elected to continue on to a base with a long enough runway for a safe landing rather than risk the lives of his crew landing on a closer, but shorter emergency strip. During the four hour trip to the airfield Lieutenant Stickell bled to death. As a result of his sacrifice and his earlier bravery during previous attacks on enemy installations Lieutenant Stickell was awarded the Navy Cross.
- 11 January 1944: VB-108 was relocated to Apanama Gilbert Islands, still under the operational control of FAW-2. Missions from this location were carried out against Kwajalein, Rongelap, Eniwetok, Parry, Wake, and Kusaie islands resulting in the sinking of at least four enemy vessels.
- 7 March 1944: A detachment was sent to Kwajalein to operate with VB-109.
- 28 February 1944: Two aircraft piloted by Lieutenant Commander John E. Muldrow and Lieutenant Max A. Piper conducted the first daylight bombing attack ever launched on Wake Island. The attack was delivered at low-level (less than 100-foot (30 m)) with 500-pound bombs. The mission was one of the longest conducted by VB-108 at that time, covering 2,500 miles (4,000 km) round-trip with over 19 hours in the air.
- 11 Apr 1944: VB-108 moved to Stickell Field on Eniwetok. On that day one of the squadron aircraft attacked an enemy submarine while on patrol, claiming a sinking. This was undoubtedly I-174, which departed on 3 April 1944 from the Inland Sea of Japan for the Marshall Islands. It failed to answer when called on 11 April 1944. Over the next three months the squadron bombed and strafed installations at Orolick, Ulul, Ujelang, Ant and Pakin islands.
- 10 July 1944: VB-108 was relieved at Eniwetok by VB-116 for return to NAS Kaneohe Bay. After arriving at NAS Kaneohe Bay a week later, the squadron was put on standby status as a ready squadron. Little activity took place other than routine patrols and training flights while crews returned to the US for rotation and processing of new personnel.
- 20 September – October 1944: The squadron was reformed at NAS Alameda, California, with its new personnel and PB4Y-1 aircraft. Training continued at NAS Alameda until 17 October 1944, when the squadron was relocated to NAAS Crow's Landing, California, for further flight training and preparation for transpac to Hawaii. During this period the squadron came under the operational control of FAW-8.
- 10 January 1945: The ground crews and support staff of the squadron, consisting of one officer and 87 enlisted personnel, departed San Diego by ship arriving in Hawaii on 18 January 1945. The VPB-108 aircrews departed in three aircraft elements on the 18th, with all aircraft arriving safely at NAS Kaneohe Bay by 19 January 1945.
- 20 January – 12 March 1945: VPB-108 aircrews began intensive combat training at Kaneohe, with emphasis on air-to-air combat. During this period the squadron came under the operational control of FAW-2. In early February the squadron received new PB4Y-2 Privateer aircraft as replacements for its Liberators.
- 13 March 1945: VPB-108 was transferred to Peleliu Airfield, Palau, under the operational control of FAW-1 (TG 50.5). The squadron operated as part of the Tinian Search Group (CTU 50.5.3), and conducted nightly antishipping patrols in the Palau area.
- 4 April 1945: VPB-108 was transferred to NAB Tinian to conduct sector searches and continue daily anti-shipping patrols in the Marianas area. An advanced detachment of eight aircraft and nine crews operated from 15 to 30 April 1945 at Central Field, Iwo Jima. A second detachment operated from that location from 1 to 8 May 1945. During the stay on Tinian Lieutenant Commander Robert C. Lefever experimented with a two-cannon arrangement mounted in the nose of his aircraft. The twin 20-mm gun mount was so successful in combat operations that the remainder of the squadron aircraft were quickly retrofitted with the additional armament.
- 9 May 1945: Lieutenant Commander John E. Muldrow, the squadron commanding officer, and seven of his crew were killed in a combat mission against Japanese-held Marcus Island. The attack was conducted in conjunction with several aircraft of VPB-102. USS Jallao rescued five of the surviving crewmembers. In addition to the loss of Lieutenant Commander Muldrow's aircraft, one VPB-102 Privateer aircraft was shot down in flames. As a result of his heroism in leading the attack in the face of intense ground fire, destruction of two enemy aircraft and severe damage to enemy ground targets, Lieutenant Commander Muldrow was posthumously awarded the Navy Cross. Lieutenant (jg) Richard D. Panther was also awarded the Navy Cross for his action against Marcus Island. On 9 May he led his aircraft in successful low-level attacks against enemy installations on the island. He also assisted in the destruction of two enemy aircraft and inflicted severe casualties on enemy troops.
- 3 June – July 1945: The advanced detachment operating from Iwo Jima was increased to 12 aircraft and 13 crews. On 1 July 1945, the remainder of the squadron joined the detachment at Iwo Jima. Duties included searches, anti-shipping patrols and barrier patrols. In addition to standard patrols, the squadron executed 31 Dumbo (air-sea rescue) missions in the month of July.
- 2 September 1945: From Iwo Jima the squadron conducted a flyover with VPB-117 and VPB-124 at Truk as a demonstration of power in conjunction with the formal surrender ceremonies held that same day aboard USS Missouri in Tokyo Bay, Japan.
- 10 January 1949: The squadron maintained an advance detachment at NAF Naha, Okinawa, for search and rescue, typhoon reconnaissance and possible emergency airlift in the closing stages of the Chinese Civil War.
- June – July 1950: At the outbreak of the Korean War on 25 June 1950, VP-28 was already deployed to NAS Agana, Guam. On 14 July 1950, the squadron relocated to NAF Naha, Okinawa, with a detachment remaining at NAS Agana. During the first few weeks of the hostilities the squadron flew patrols over the Formosa Strait, Foochow and Shanghai, China.
- 26 July 1950: A squadron aircraft encountered enemy fighters during a patrol mission.
- April – October 1951: The squadron's primary mission during this combat deployment to Korea was ship surveillance and the secondary mission was Anti-submarine warfare (ASW) patrol. VP-28 was also assigned the additional task of special night weather reconnaissance patrols along the Korean coast.
- 28 Jun 1951: During the squadron's second tour in the Korean combat zone it was ordered to participate in Operation Firefly, the dropping of flares to provide illumination for United States Marine Corps night fighters attacking supply routes in North Korea.
- 1 October 1951: The squadron was ordered to form a detachment to continue flare operations in Korea following its return to NAS Barbers Point, Hawaii. On 1 October four planes, 13 officers and 39 enlisted personnel were detached from the squadron and assigned as VP-28 Detachment Able to continue the flare dropping mission in Korea until relieved by VP-871.
- 16 December 1951: The squadron's Detachment Able returned to NAS Barbers Point from NAS Atsugi, Japan, after 2 1/2 months of flare operations totaling 1,103 flight hours.
- 26 May 1952: VP-28 deployed to NAF Naha, Okinawa. From this location the squadron maintained patrols along the Communist-held China coast and the Formosa Strait.
- 20 September 1952: A P4Y-2S flown by Lieutenant Harvey R. Britt was attacked by two MiG-15s over the sea near Shanghai. Five firing passes were made by the MiGs without damage to the Privateer, which returned safely to NAF Naha. During the remainder of the deployment three more squadron patrols were subjected to attacks by MiGs. Squadron aircraft exchanged fire with the MiGs but no damage was reported on any of the aircraft.
- 28 November 1952: The squadron transferred three P4Y-2S Privateers to Military Assistance Advisory Group (MAAG) Formosa for transfer to the Chinese Nationalist Air Force.
- 8 January 1955: VP-28 deployed to Japan under the operational control of FAW-6. Daily surveillance flights were flown over the Sea of Japan and the Yellow Sea.
- June 1956: VP-28 deployed to NAS Kodiak, Alaska. During the deployment the squadron flewsurveillance patrols along the northern defense perimeter, and assisted scientists in gathering data on ice conditions in the Bering Sea and volcanic activity along the Aleutian Islands.
- 23 July 1957: A squadron P2V-5F, BuNo. 128418, crashed 300-foot (91 m) off the end of the NAS Barbers Point runway, killing all eleven crewmen aboard.
- 17 April 1962: VP-28 deployed to advance bases on Christmas and Johnston islands to provide air reconnaissance during U.S. nuclear testing. The squadron flew enough miles during the three-month period to circumnavigate the world 18 times.

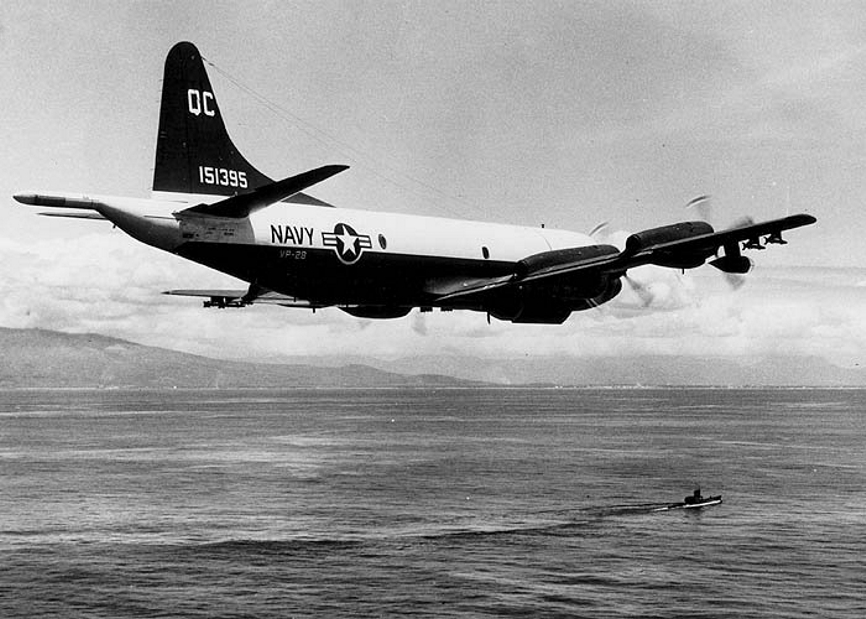
A VP-28 P-3A in 1964.

- 16 May 1964: VP-28 deployed to WestPac, based at MCAS Iwakuni, Japan, with a detachment at NS Sangley Point, Philippines. From August to September 1964, the squadron flew a total of 1,148 hours in support of the Seventh Fleet during and after the Gulf of Tonkin incident.
- 11 December 1964 – April 1965: VP-28 received its first two P-3A Orions as replacements for the SP-2H Neptunes. Transition to the new aircraft was completed in April 1965.
- 3 Nov 1965: VP-28 deployed to WestPac with its new Orions, stationed at NS Sangley Point, with a detachment at NAS Agana, Guam. Despite the difficulties in maintaining the new type airframes at this site, the squadron flew a record number of flight hours in Operation Market Time and Yankee Team patrols for one month, surpassing the previous record set in Neptunes during the August 1964 Gulf of Tonkin incident.
- 27 May 1967: VP-28 deployed to NAS Adak, Alaska. During the deployment the ex-USS Robert Louis Stevenson was loaded with 2,000 tons of obsolete ordnance ready for disposal. The hulk was towed into position south of Amchitka Island, where it was to be scuttled. It was rigged to hydrostatically detonate at a depth of 4,000-foot (1,200 m). Research vessels nearby would monitor the explosion for oceanographic and seismic research purposes. A combination of bad weather and strong winds pushed the hulk off position after the sea cocks were opened. The vessel sank in water too shallow to detonate the charge. VP-28 was called upon to bomb the submerged wreckage and detonate the charge. A total of 24 2,000-pound bombs were dropped on the position with no secondary explosions. It was later determined that the hulk was thoroughly flattened and the ordnance dispersed in a manner that no longer posed a danger to navigation.
- 15 January – 26 May 1969: VP-28 deployed to NAF Naha, relieving VP-22. Detachments were maintained at Cam Ranh Bay Air Base, South Vietnam, and NAS Atsugi. On 18 April 1969, the squadron was put on alert following the downing of a Navy EC-121 by the North Koreans. The squadron dropped the alert status on 26 May, resuming normal operations.
- 1 October 1969: VP-28 was disestablished at NAS Barbers Point.

== Aircraft assignments ==
The squadron was assigned the following aircraft, effective on the dates shown:

- PB4Y-1 - 1 July 1943
- PB4Y-2 - 2 February 1945
- PB4Y-2S - October 1949
- P4Y-2/2S - 1951
- P2V-5 - 1 December 1952
- P2V-5F - 1959
- P2V-5FS PAR/MOD - January 1962
- SP-2H - December 1962
- P-3A - December 1964

== Home port assignments ==
The squadron was assigned to these home ports, effective on the dates shown:

- NAS San Diego, California - 1 July 1943
- NAAS Camp Kearney, California - 3 July 1943
- NAS Kaneohe Bay, Hawaii - 3 October 1943
- NAS Alameda, California - 20 September 1944
- NAAS Crows Landing, California - 17 October 1944
- NAS Kaneohe Bay - 19 January 1945
- NAF Naha, Okinawa - December 1945
- NAS Kaneohe Bay - April 1948
- NAS Barbers Point, Hawaii - 10 July 1949

== See also ==
- Maritime patrol aircraft
- List of inactive United States Navy aircraft squadrons
- List of United States Navy aircraft squadrons
- List of squadrons in the Dictionary of American Naval Aviation Squadrons
- History of the United States Navy
