= VP-7 =

Patrol Squadron 7
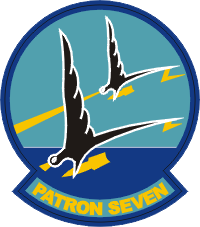
- Active: 15 August 1944 – 8 October 1969
- Country: United States of America
- Branch: United States Navy
- Type: squadron
- Role: Maritime patrol
- Nicknames: Dragon Patrol; Black Falcons
- Engagements: World War II

Aircraft flown
- Patrol: PB4Y-1; PB4Y-2; P2V-2/3/4/5/5F/SP-2H

VP-7 was a Patrol Squadron of the U.S. Navy. The squadron was established as Bombing Squadron 119 (VB-119) on 15 August 1944, redesignated Patrol Bombing Squadron 119 (VPB-119) on 1 October 1944, redesignated Patrol Squadron 119 (VP-119) on 15 May 1946, redesignated Heavy Patrol Squadron (Landplane) 9 (VP-HL-9) on 15 November 1946, redesignated Medium Patrol Squadron (Landplane) 7 (VP-ML-7) on 25 June 1947, redesignated Patrol Squadron 7 (VP-7) on 1 September 1948 and disestablished on 8 October 1969. It was the second squadron to be designated VP-7, the first VP-7 was redesignated VP-11 on 1 July 1939.

== Operational history ==
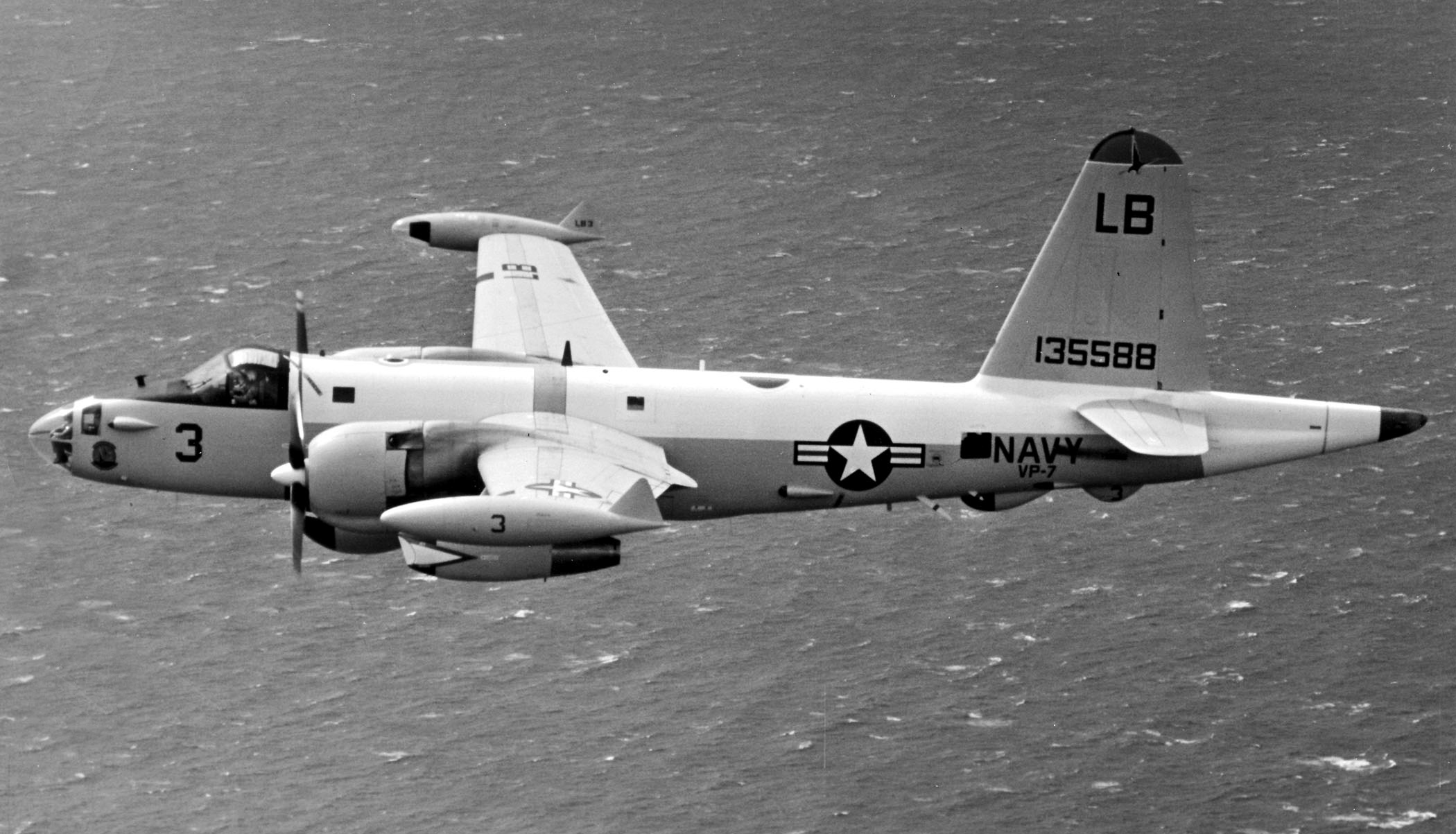
A VP-7 SP-2H, c.1966

- 15 August – 14 December 1944: VB-119 was established at NAAS Camp Kearney, California. Crew training commenced immediately on the PB4Y-1 Liberator and the PB4Y-2 Privateer bombers.
- 15 December 1944 – 14 January 1945: The squadron was transferred to NAS Kaneohe Bay, Hawaii, for further combat readiness training. The first planes departed for NAS Kaneohe on 15 December and the last planes left on 25 December. Training of crews continued at NAS Kaneohe Bay, including combat patrols operating from Midway Island from 3 to 14 January 1945. At that time the squadron had 15 aircraft and 18 crews assigned.
- 7 February 1945: VPB-119 was transferred to Tacloban Air Base, Leyte, Philippines. Training flights were conducted through the end of the month in the area of Mokerang Airfield, Los Negros, Admiralty Islands.
- 1 March 1945: VPB-119 was transferred to Clark Air Base, Luzon, Philippines. On the following day the squadron conducted its first combat patrols over the South China Sea.
- 22 March 1945: Lieutenant (jg) James Evans and crew, accompanied by war correspondent Don Bell, were shot down over Amoy Harbor on the China coast by enemy antiaircraft fire. Bell, only recently released from a POW camp in Manila, was anxious to get back into the war effort. Seven personnel survived the crash of the PB4Y-2 Privateer. Chinese fishermen rescued Bell and the six surviving crewmembers, and in a race with three Japanese motor boats made it to shore where they were hidden in a village. A few days later, a shore party from a Navy installation only 27 miles (43 km) away rescued the survivors.
- 1 April – 14 August 1945: Lieutenant Commander Bales, the commanding officer of VPB-119, and his crew were shot down over China on 1 April with no survivors. Lieutenant Commander Ragan, executive officer, assumed command of the squadron. Patrols continued through 14 August 1945 when word of the Surrender of Japan was received. During the squadron's six months of combat operations from Clark Air Base it claimed the destruction of 13 aircraft in the air, the sinking or damaging of a large number of ships and the destruction of many shore installations.
- 15 August – 3 September 1945: Routine shipping reconnaissance patrols were conducted in conjunction with VPB-104. The squadron was also responsible for supplying weather information and typhoon tracking.
- 25 October – 2 November 1945: VPB-119 was relocated to Puerto Princesa, Philippines, with all assets and personnel aboard by 2 November. Operations were commenced immediately in concert with VPB-106. The primary duty of the two squadrons included weather reconnaissance and shipping surveillance flights over the Indochina area. Weather during this period was extremely adverse.
- 15 November – December 1945: A three-plane detachment was flown to NAB Samar to fly weather reconnaissance. In December, the remainder of the squadron joined the detachment. The principal mission of the squadron while stationed at Samar was weather reconnaissance, shipping lane patrols and air-sea search.
- 8 February 1946: The squadron received orders to reduce the size of the aircraft complement from 12 to 8. Rapid demobilization drastically decreased the officer and enlisted ranks. During this period VPB-119 was again tasked with weather reconnaissance and typhoon tracking, as well as air-sea search and patrol.
- 3 June 1946: VP-119 was relocated to NAS Sangley Point, Philippines, with principal duties of shipping lane patrol and special flights as directed by FAW-10. The transfer was completed on 25 June 1946.
- 26 August 1946: VP-119 began monthly shuttle flights from NAS Sangley Point to China, Okinawa and return. The flights were utilized as occasions for training in long distance navigation, radio range procedures and cruise control settings.
- 10 January 1947: At the request of the Philippine government, two aircraft of VP-119 made several flights over Mayon Volcano during an eruption to provide information on the direction of lava flow and the resulting damage to inhabited areas.
- 20 May – 6 June 1947: The squadron was notified of pending transfer to the Atlantic Fleet, with movement commencing immediately. Air crews and aircraft arrived at MCAS Miramar, California, on 6 June 1947.
- 25 July – October 1947: Transition to the P2V-2 aircraft commenced at MCAS Miramar with the arrival of the first aircraft and instructor crew. Crew training was completed just in time for relocation to a new home port at NAS Quonset Point, Rhode Island. The first squadron air crew departed for NAS Quonset Point on 9 September 1947, with the last arriving on 18 October 1947.
- December 1948: Four crews flew to Kitty Hawk, North Carolina, to participate in the Wright brothers's Memorial Service and the anniversary of powered flight.
- 14 April 1950: The first of the new P2V-4 aircraft arrived and familiarization training was begun. Problems with the engines prevented the squadron from meeting its operational obligations for several months. The difficulties were not fully corrected until late 1951.
- 1 June 1953: VP-7 deployed to NS San Juan, Puerto Rico, to participate in Operation Springboard, the annual fleet training exercise.
- 28 June 1953 – January 1954: The squadron redeployed to MCAS Iwakuni, Japan, under the command of FAW-6, for operations in support of United Nations action in Korea. VP-7 was called upon to fly reconnaissance and screening missions in support of Task Force 77. The squadron returned to NAS Quonset Point in January 1954.
- January 1959: The squadron conducted a split deployment to Naval Station Rota, Spain, and NAS Keflavik, Iceland. During the deployment in the North Atlantic excellent photographs were taken of a Soviet Zulu-class submarine located off the coast of Iceland. The photos were released to the international press.
- 23 October 1962: VP-7 deployed to Guantanamo Bay Naval Base, Cuba, to conduct surveillance operations against Soviet transports during the Cuban Quarantine. The squadron was relieved at the end of November 1962.
- May 1963: VP-7 participated in the Mercury-Atlas 9 recovery operations in the Caribbean.
- June 1967: The squadron was called upon to provide shipping surveillance during the Six-Day War. VP-7 was deployed to NAF Sigonella, Sicily, to take part in exercises with NATO and the Sixth Fleet when the war broke out.
- 8 October 1969: VP-7 was disestablished.

== Aircraft assignments ==
The squadron was assigned the following aircraft, effective on the dates shown:

- PB4Y-1 – August 1944
- PB4Y-2 – August 1947
- P2V-2 – August 1947
- P2V-3 – March 1949
- P2V-4 – April 1950
- P2V-5 – 1953
- P2V-5F – July 1955
- SP-2H – December 1964

== Home port assignments ==
The squadron was assigned to these home ports, effective on the dates shown:

- NAAS Camp Kearney, California – 15 August 1944
- NAS Kaneohe Bay, Hawaii – 15 December 1944
- Various bases in the Philippines – 11 February 1945
- NAB Samar, Philippines – 16 December 1945
- NAS Sangley Point, Philippines – 3 June 1946
- MCAS Miramar – 6 June 1947
- NAS Quonset Point, Rhode Island – 18 October 1947
- NAS Brunswick, Maine – 4 December 1956
- NAS Jacksonville, Florida – September 1961

== See also ==
- Maritime patrol aircraft
- List of inactive United States Navy aircraft squadrons
- List of United States Navy aircraft squadrons
- List of squadrons in the Dictionary of American Naval Aviation Squadrons
- History of the United States Navy
