= VPB-118 =

Patrol Bombing Squadron 118
- Active: 1 July 1944 – 11 December 1945
- Country: United States of America
- Branch: United States Navy
- Type: squadron
- Role: Maritime patrol
- Engagements: World War II

Aircraft flown
- Patrol: PB4Y-2

VPB-118 was a Patrol Bombing Squadron of the U.S. Navy. The squadron was established as Bombing Squadron 118 (VB-118) on 1 July 1944, redesignated Patrol Bombing Squadron 118 (VPB-118) on 1 October 1944, and disestablished on 11 December 1945.

== Operational history ==
- 1 July – 15 November 1944: VB-118 was established at NAAS Camp Kearney, California, as a heavy bombing squadron flying the PB4Y-1 Liberator under the operational control of FAW-14. After completing a four-week ground school and limited flight training on three weary PB4Y-1 Liberators, the squadron was relocated to NAAS Crows Landing, California, for advanced flight training. On 20 August, VB-118 began receiving its first PB4Y-2 Privateers. The squadron stood down from the training syllabus in mid-November to prepare for the upcoming trans-Pacific flight to Hawaii. On 15 November the ground support personnel boarded USS General R. L. Howze for transportation to Hawaii.
- 20 November – December 1944: VPB-118's aircraft departed California for NAS Kaneohe Bay, Hawaii, arriving by 21 November. During the next month the squadron came under FAW-2 while undergoing further training in preparation for combat. On 10 December a detachment of aircraft was sent to Midway Island to conduct operational patrols, returning on 22 December.
- 6 January – Apr 1945: VPB-118 departed NAS Kaneohe Bay for the combat zone, arriving at Tinian, Marianas Islands, on 10 January. Operational control of the squadron passed to FAW-1. Routine operational patrols continued from Tinian through mid-April. Squadron targets attacked included Truk, Iwo Jima, Yawata Shima, and Okinawa.
- 22 April 1945: VPB-118 was transferred to Yontan Airfield, Okinawa. Administrative headquarters staff of the squadron remained on Tinian. Patrols and antishipping sweeps commenced upon the squadron's arrival. Positioning the squadron on Okinawa had become necessary due to the lack of sufficient targets in the patrol sectors around Tinian.
- 2 May 1945: The squadron was taken off patrols to conduct a special attack on Kanoya Air Field, in southern Japan. Third Fleet intelligence had indications that a large attack force of Mitsubishi G4M Betty bombers was being formed to transport Baka bombs in an attempt to wipe out U.S. combat vessels located off Okinawa. The six remaining Privateers of VPB-118 were the only aircraft available on short notice. The strike caught the enemy totally by surprise. The damage inflicted on the airfield and assembled aircraft prevented the enemy's intended operation from being carried out.
- 6 May 1945: Lieutenants Montgomery and J. A. Lasater were patrolling an area off the southern coast of Korea when they encountered a number of enemy destroyers and a small tanker. In the attack, the tanker exploded just as Montgomery's Privateer was entering its bomb run. 20-foot (6.1 m) of the ship's Hawser and the king post strap were imbedded in the starboard wing. Montgomery managed to return to Okinawa on three engines but Lasater elected to continue the patrol alone. He and his crew never returned and were listed as missing in action.
- 7 May 1945: Five aircraft were sent on a patrol off the coast of Korea. After shooting down one Japanese observation plane, Lieutenant Farwell and his crew attacked a 2,000-ton tanker. While completing a bomb run that finally sank the ship, Farwell's Privateer was struck repeatedly by heavy anti-aircraft (AA) fire. He ditched the aircraft with no casualties. As their squadron mates flew air cover above, a PBM landed within 30 minutes and retrieved the crew. One of the other Privateers flown by Lieutenant Norman M. Keiser sank a 4,000-ton freighter despite fire from its two destroyer escorts. In the same action Keiser and his crew strafed a second vessel, forcing it to beach ashore. Later on the same patrol, Keiser and his crew strafed and set on fire a third vessel. For his courage under fire and determination at pressing home the attack, Lieutenant Keiser was awarded the Navy Cross.
- 11 May 1945: The pace of combat left the squadron with only three serviceable aircraft which were in need of major repairs. It became necessary for the squadron to return to Tinian for refit and maintenance of the aircraft and crew rest. The squadron remained at Yontan Airfield until mid-May when it was relieved by VPB-109. Prior to the squadron's departure it provided support to VPB-109 to familiarize them with mission requirements. In the first two days of VPB-109's stay on Okinawa, a VPB-118 Privateer accompanied them on patrol to familiarize them with the territory. On one of these missions, Lieutenant Lloyd's aircraft had an engine shot out and was pocked with 180 bullet holes.
- 2 June 1945: The squadron was ready to return to Okinawa from Tinian when disaster struck. One aircraft caught fire while undergoing last-minute maintenance, and one more was destroyed and two others damaged when a crippled B-29 crashed into the parking area. All the squadron welfare and recreation gear plus most of the personal baggage was lost. The aircraft were quickly replaced and after only a few days’ delay, VPB-118 was back on Okinawa by 7 June 1945 continuing its antishipping patrols, conducting strikes on land targets, and dropping mines in harbors throughout the Korean coastline and Kamino-shima.
- 8 August 1945: Lieutenant (jg) J. R. Park and crew were killed during an attack on an enemy freighter in the Tsushima Straits. The vessel had been set on fire by strafing, and when Park made his final bombing pass the ship's cargo detonated when the aircraft was directly above it. The ship apparently was carrying munitions and nothing remained of the ship or aircraft after the explosion.
- 10 August 1945: Offensive patrols ceased. Regular patrols continued but the aircraft still carried defensive armament and instructions "not to attack, unless attacked."
- 1 September – November 1945: VPB-118 was relocated to Yonabaru Airfield, Okinawa. Several aircrews were sent to Tinian for R&R. The airfields at Yonabaru were in such bad shape that the squadron was not able to resume patrols until 24 September. A sudden typhoon on 9 October compounded the miserable conditions. On 24 October VPB-118 received orders to report to Tinian for aircraft overhaul and maintenance. The work at Tinian was completed on 3 November, and the squadron returned to Yonabaru.
- 14 November – 3 December 1945: The squadron received orders to begin packing for the return to the US. VPB-118 began its journey homeward with departure on 18 November from Yonabaru bound for NAS Kaneohe Bay. On 27 November the squadron boarded USS Prince William en route to NAS San Diego, California, arriving on 3 December.
- 11 December 1945: VPB-118 was disestablished at NAS San Diego.

== Aircraft assignments ==
The squadron was assigned the following aircraft, effective on the dates shown:

- PB4Y-2 - August 1944

== Home port assignments ==
The squadron was assigned to these home ports, effective on the dates shown:

- NAAS Camp Kearney, California - 1 July 1944
- NAAS Crows Landing, California - August 1944
- NAS Kaneohe Bay, Hawaii - 20 November 1944
- NAS San Diego, California - 3 December 1945

== See also ==
- Maritime patrol aircraft
- List of inactive United States Navy aircraft squadrons
- List of United States Navy aircraft squadrons
- List of squadrons in the Dictionary of American Naval Aviation Squadrons
- History of the United States Navy
