= Crows Landing, California =

Crows Landing
- census-designated place
- Location of Crows Landing in Stanislaus County, California.

- Position in California.
- Coordinates: 37°23′41″N 121°05′04″W
- Country: United States
- State: California
- County: Stanislaus

Area
  - Total: 1.65 sq mi (4.28 km^{2})
  - Land: 1.65 sq mi (4.28 km^{2})
  - Water: 0 sq mi (0.00 km^{2}) 0%
- Elevation: 128 ft (39 m)

Population (2020)
  - Total: 322
  - Density: 194.7/sq mi (75.19/km^{2})
- Time zone: UTC-8 (Pacific (PST))
  - Summer (DST): UTC-7 (PDT)
- ZIP Code: 95313
- Area code: 209
- GNIS feature ID: 2582988

Crows Landing is a census-designated place (CDP) in Stanislaus County, California, United States. Crows Landing is approximately 20 miles (32 km) southwest of Modesto. Crows Landing sits at an elevation of 128 feet (39 m). The 2020 United States census reported Crows Landing's population was 322.

== History ==
Crows Landing was founded on the San Joaquin River, as a river landing or crossing, by John Crow, who was born in Missouri in 1830 and died in California in 1917; John Crow's father, Walter Crow, had left Missouri to mine gold in California in 1849. John Crow emigrated from Missouri to California in a covered wagon with his wife Margaret Malinda Bodenhamer, born in 1837 in Quincy, Illinois and who died in California in 1918. The Crows had 12 children, but not all survived to adulthood.

In 1887, Crows Landing was relocated to its present site, four miles west of its original location, to be served by the Southern Pacific Railroad.

Members of the Crow family still live at Crows Landing and operate a walnut farm.

The small airport at Crows Landing, west of town, was formerly used as an auxiliary landing site for training World War II pilots from Naval Air Station Alameda, and later for NASA's experimental aircraft from the Ames Research Center in Mountain View. In 2000, control of the airfield was transferred to Stanislaus County. The airfield has been closed since 2011 and was used for testing cars, trucks, aircraft, and for storage. In 2022, The Modesto Bee reported that Stanislaus County announced plans to redevelop the former airfield into a business park. Initial Construction on the business park began in late 2025.

== Geography ==
According to the United States Census Bureau, the CDP covers an area of 1.7 square miles (4.4 km^{2}), all land.

== Demographics ==
Historical population
| Census | Pop. | Note | %± |
|---|---|---|---|
| 2010 | 355 | | — |
| 2020 | 322 | | −9.3% |
U.S. Decennial Census

The 2020 United States census reported that Crows Landing had a population of 322. The population density was 194.7 inhabitants per square mile (75.2/km^{2}). The racial makeup of Crows Landing was 103 (32.0%) White, 7 (2.2%) African American, 1 (0.3%) Native American, 0 (0.0%) Asian, 0 (0.0%) Pacific Islander, 164 (50.9%) from other races, and 47 (14.6%) from two or more races. Hispanic or Latino of any race were 243 persons (75.5%).

The whole population lived in households. There were 100 households, out of which 31 (31.0%) had children under the age of 18 living in them, 45 (45.0%) were married-couple households, 4 (4.0%) were cohabiting couple households, 19 (19.0%) had a female householder with no partner present, and 32 (32.0%) had a male householder with no partner present. 29 households (29.0%) were one person, and 11 (11.0%) were one person aged 65 or older. The average household size was 3.22. There were 68 families (68.0% of all households).

The age distribution was 86 people (26.7%) under the age of 18, 23 people (7.1%) aged 18 to 24, 85 people (26.4%) aged 25 to 44, 99 people (30.7%) aged 45 to 64, and 29 people (9.0%) who were 65 years of age or older. The median age was 37.0 years. For every 100 females, there were 161.8 males.

There were 113 housing units at an average density of 68.3 units per square mile (26.4 units/km^{2}), of which 100 (88.5%) were occupied. Of these, 47 (47.0%) were owner-occupied, and 53 (53.0%) were occupied by renters.
