= German submarine U-164 (1941) =

German World War II submarine

Coordinates: 1°58′S 39°22′W

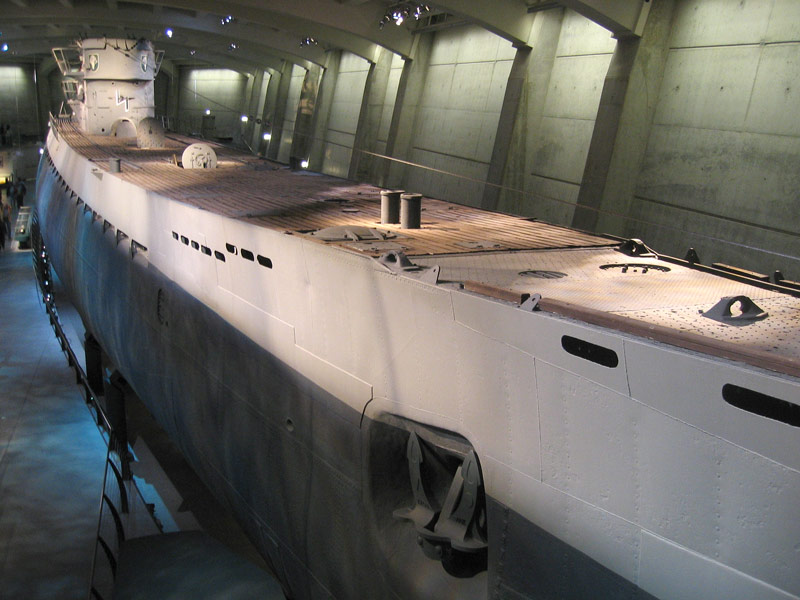
- U-505, a typical Type IXC boat

History

Nazi Germany
- Name: U-164
- Ordered: 25 September 1939
- Builder: DeSchiMAG, Bremen
- Yard number: 703
- Laid down: 20 June 1940
- Launched: 1 May 1941
- Commissioned: 28 November 1941
- Fate: Sunk on 6 January 1943

General characteristics
- Class & type: Type IXC submarine
- Displacement: 1,120 t (1,100 long tons) surfaced; 1,232 t (1,213 long tons) submerged
- Length: 76.76 m (251 ft 10 in) o/a; 58.75 m (192 ft 9 in) pressure hull
- Beam: 6.76 m (22 ft 2 in) overall; 4.40 m (14 ft 5 in) pressure hull
- Height: 9.60 m (31 ft 6 in)
- Draught: 4.70 m (15 ft 5 in)
- Installed power: 4,400 PS (3,200 kW; 4,300 bhp) (diesels); 1,000 PS (740 kW; 990 shp) (electric)
- Propulsion: 2 shafts; 2 × diesel engines; 2 × electric motors
- Speed: 18.3 knots (33.9 km/h; 21.1 mph) surfaced; 7.3 knots (13.5 km/h; 8.4 mph) submerged
- Range: 13,450 nmi (24,910 km; 15,480 mi) at 10 knots (19 km/h; 12 mph) surfaced; 64 nmi (119 km; 74 mi) at 4 knots (7.4 km/h; 4.6 mph) submerged
- Test depth: 230 m (750 ft)
- Complement: 4 officers, 44 enlisted
- Armament: 6 × torpedo tubes (4 bow, 2 stern); 22 × 53.3 cm (21 in) torpedoes; 1 × 10.5 cm (4.1 in) SK C/32 deck gun (180 rounds); 1 × 3.7 cm (1.5 in) SK C/30 AA gun; 1 × twin 2 cm FlaK 30 AA guns

Service record
- Part of: 4th U-boat Flotilla; 28 November 1941 – 31 July 1942; 10th U-boat Flotilla; 1 August 1942 – 6 January 1943
- Identification codes: M 41 384
- Commanders: K.Kapt. Otto Fechner; 28 November 1941 – 6 January 1943
- Operations: 2 patrols: 1st patrol: 18 July – 7 October 1942; 2nd patrol: 29 November 1942 – 6 January 1943
- Victories: 3 merchant ships sunk (8,133 GRT)

German submarine U-164 was a Type IXC U-boat of Nazi Germany's Kriegsmarine built for service during World War II. The keel for this boat was laid down on 20 June 1940 at the Deutsche Schiff- und Maschinenbau AG, Bremen yard as yard number 703. She was launched on 1 May 1941 and commissioned on 28 November 1941 under the command of Korvettenkapitän Otto Fechner.

The U-boat's service began with training as part of the 4th U-boat Flotilla. She then moved to the 10th flotilla on 1 August 1942 for operations. She sank three ships, totalling 8,133 gross register tons (GRT).

She was sunk by an American aircraft on 6 January 1943.

== Design ==
German Type IXC submarines were slightly larger than the original Type IXBs. U-164 had a displacement of 1,120 tonnes (1,100 long tons) when at the surface and 1,232 tonnes (1,213 long tons) while submerged. The U-boat had a total length of 76.76 m (251 ft 10 in), a pressure hull length of 58.75 m (192 ft 9 in), a beam of 6.76 m (22 ft 2 in), a height of 9.60 m (31 ft 6 in), and a draught of 4.70 m (15 ft 5 in). The submarine was powered by two MAN M 9 V 40/46 supercharged four-stroke, nine-cylinder diesel engines producing a total of 4,400 metric horsepower (3,240 kW; 4,340 shp) for use while surfaced, two Siemens-Schuckert 2 GU 345/34 double-acting electric motors producing a total of 1,000 metric horsepower (740 kW; 990 shp) for use while submerged. She had two shafts and two 1.92 m (6 ft) propellers. The boat was capable of operating at depths of up to 230 metres (750 ft).

The submarine had a maximum surface speed of 18.3 knots (33.9 km/h; 21.1 mph) and a maximum submerged speed of 7.3 knots (13.5 km/h; 8.4 mph). When submerged, the boat could operate for 63 nautical miles (117 km; 72 mi) at 4 knots (7.4 km/h; 4.6 mph); when surfaced, she could travel 13,450 nautical miles (24,910 km; 15,480 mi) at 10 knots (19 km/h; 12 mph). U-164 was fitted with six 53.3 cm (21 in) torpedo tubes (four fitted at the bow and two at the stern), 22 torpedoes, one 10.5 cm (4.13 in) SK C/32 naval gun, 180 rounds, and a 3.7 cm (1.5 in) SK C/30 as well as a 2 cm (0.79 in) C/30 anti-aircraft gun. The boat had a complement of forty-eight.

== Service history ==
=== First patrol ===
The submarine's first patrol took her from Kiel on 18 July 1942, across the North Sea and into the Atlantic Ocean through the gap between Iceland and the Faroe Islands. She sank Stad Amsterdam on 25 August in the eastern Caribbean. The first torpedoes hit, except they were duds, probably fired from too close-in; but a coup de grǎce caused the ship to sink stern-first. The boat also sank John A. Holloway northwest of Curaçao. U-164 arrived at Lorient, in occupied France, on 7 October. She would be based at this Atlantic port for the rest of her brief career.

=== Second patrol and loss ===
She sank Brageland, a neutral Swedish ship, on 1 January 1943. A three-man boarding party inspected the ship and under the prize rules, she was torpedoed.

U-164 was sunk by an American PBY Catalina flying boat of VP-83 125 nmi (232 km; 144 mi) from northwest of Ceará State shoreline, Brazil on 6 January 1943. 54 men died, there were two survivors.

== Summary of raiding history ==
Date	Name	Nationality	Tonnage (GRT)	Fate
25 August 1942	Stad Amsterdam	Netherlands	3,780	Sunk
6 September 1942	John A. Holloway	Canada	1,745	Sunk
1 January 1943	Brageland	Sweden	2,608	Sunk

== Bibliography ==
- Busch, Rainer; Röll, Hans-Joachim (1999). German U-boat commanders of World War II : a biographical dictionary. Translated by Brooks, Geoffrey. London, Annapolis, Md: Greenhill Books, Naval Institute Press. ISBN 1-55750-186-6.
- Busch, Rainer; Röll, Hans-Joachim (1999). Deutsche U-Boot-Verluste von September 1939 bis Mai 1945 [German U-boat losses from September 1939 to May 1945]. Der U-Boot-Krieg (in German). Vol. IV. Hamburg, Berlin, Bonn: Mittler. ISBN 3-8132-0514-2.
- Gröner, Erich; Jung, Dieter; Maass, Martin (1991). U-boats and Mine Warfare Vessels. German Warships 1815–1945. Vol. 2. Translated by Thomas, Keith; Magowan, Rachel. London: Conway Maritime Press. ISBN 0-85177-593-4.
- Kemp, Paul (1999). U-Boats Destroyed – German Submarine Losses in the World Wars. London: Arms & Armour. ISBN 1-85409-515-3.
