= VP-27 =

Patrol Squadron 27
- Active: 15 September 1941 – 11 January 1950
- Country: United States of America
- Branch: United States Navy
- Type: squadron
- Role: Maritime patrol
- Engagements: World War II

Aircraft flown
- Patrol: OS2U; PBY-5A; PB4Y-1; PB4Y-2

VP-27 was a Patrol Squadron of the U.S. Navy. The squadron was established as Patrol Squadron 83 (VP-83) on 15 September 1941, redesignated Bombing Squadron 107 (VB-107) on 15 May 1943, redesignated Patrol Bombing Squadron 107 (VPB-107) on 1 October 1944, redesignated Patrol Squadron 107 (VP-107) on 15 May 1946, redesignated Heavy Patrol Squadron (Landplane) 7 (VP-HL-7) on 15 November 1946, redesignated Patrol Squadron 27 (VP-27) on 1 September 1948 and disestablished on 11 January 1950.

== Operational history ==
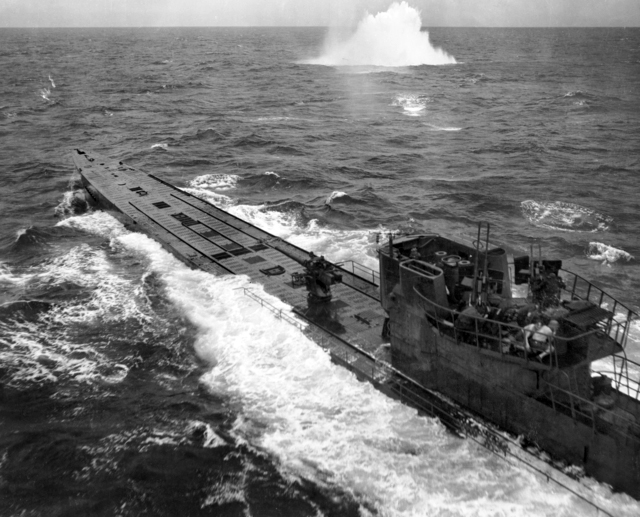
U-848 under attack by aircraft of VB-107, 5 November 1943

- 15 September – November 1941: VP-83 was established at NAS Norfolk, Virginia, under the operational control of FAW-5. The unit was designated a seaplane squadron flying the PBY-5 Catalina, but shortages in aircraft resulted in delivery delays. Until new aircraft became available in November, the aircrews practiced water takeoff and landings in an OS2U Kingfisher. On 24 November 1941, six crews were selected to proceed to San Diego, California, to collect new PBY-5A amphibious Catalinas from the factory. Shortly after they arrived at San Diego, Pearl Harbor was attacked, and they were immediately pressed into service for Anti-submarine warfare (ASW) and interceptor patrols on the West Coast. The detachment eventually managed to ferry 30 PBY-5As from the West Coast to Norfolk between January and February 1942.
- 20 December 1941 – 5 March 1942: VP-83 flew its first operational combat patrol over the Atlantic off the coast of Virginia. On 5 February 1942, the squadron began night sweeps of the convoy routes into the port of Norfolk, Virginia. These patrols were discontinued on 5 March 1942, and the squadron was given a period of intensive ASW training in preparation for overseas deployment.
- 30 March 1942: A detachment with six squadron aircraft deployed to Natal, Brazil and operated from Parnarmarin Field at Natal. The remaining six aircraft and crews operated from NAS Norfolk and, at various times, also had detachments at NAS Banana River, Florida, NAS Jacksonville, Florida, and NAS Charleston, South Carolina, to conduct convoy coverage and search operations under the operational control of FAW-5.
- 8 June 1942: The remaining squadron assets in the US deployed to Natal, Brazil and rejoined the other squadron detachment. The squadron's first fatalities occurred during the final leg of the flight to Brazil when Lieutenant (jg) C. H. Skidmore's Catalina en-countered a severe thunderstorm causing it to crash into the sea 5 miles (8.0 km) northeast of Natal. Only three of the eight crewmen aboard were rescued.
- 2 July 1942: VP-83 became operational at Natal, Brazil, and began combat patrols over shipping lanes along the Brazilian coastline from Rio de Janeiro to Cape Orange.
- 6 January 1943: Lieutenant W. Ford attacked a surfaced U-boat located 80 miles (130 km) northeast of Fortaleza, Brazil. The sinking was confirmed by rescued survivors as U-164.
- 13 January 1943: Lieutenant L. Ludwig attacked a surfaced U-boat off the coast of Brazil. The sinking was confirmed after the war as U-507, this submarine's activities at the start of the war were responsible for Brazil entering the war on the side of the Allies.
- 15 April 1943: Ensign T. E. Robertson and Lieutenant G. Bradford, Jr., attacked a surfaced submarine off the coast of Brazil. Ensign Robertson made the first bomb run, dropping four Depth charges that damaged the boat. Lieutenant Bradford attacked minutes later with four more depth charges dropped from an altitude of 50 feet. The submarine sank six minutes later. Thirty survivors exited the boat and boarded three rafts. One raft was found 27 days later by Brazilian fishermen. It contained two bodies and one survivor who later confirmed the sinking of Archimede, a 913-ton Italian submarine.
- 1 May 1943: VP-83 returned to NAS Norfolk. Shortly after its arrival, on 15 May 1943, the squadron was redesignated VB-107 and subsequently ended its career as a medium seaplane squadron.
- 15 May 1943: After 15 days leave, VB-107 was reformed at NAS Norfolk, as a bombing squadron flying the PB4Y-1 Liberator. During the training period, the squadron came under the operational control of FAW-5. Within a week of reforming its personnel and assets, the squadron was relocated in sections to NAAS Elizabeth City, and MCAS Cherry Point, North Carolina, for intensive ground and flight training on the PB4Y-1.
- 15 June – 5 July 1943: The first division of six VB-107 aircraft departed NAS Norfolk for Natal, Brazil, followed on the 20th by the remainder of the squadron. By 27 June 1943, all of the squadron aircraft were on board at Natal, with the squadron coming under the operational control of FAW-16. The squadron became operational on 5 July 1943 and began antishipping sweeps in designated convoy lanes off the coast of Brazil.
- 12 July 1943: Lieutenant Tobin made a night attack on a surfaced U-boat without result. In the melee the PB4Y-1 was damaged by the submarine's accurate anti-aircraft (AA) fire, forcing it to return to base on three engines.
- 23 July 1943: Lieutenant (jg) Waugh, flying 107-B-6, attacked a surfaced U-boat in conjunction with Lieutenant Ford, sinking the submarine. Waugh's aircraft apparently sustained damage during the attack, plunging into the sea after his bombing pass, all hands were lost. The submarine's identity was confirmed by survivors as U-598.
- 12 August 1943: Squadron commanding officer Lieutenant Commander B. G. Prueher departed Natal at 08:00 with an extra-heavy load of fuel, intended for a protracted search of an area of suspected U-boat operations. Three surfaced U-boats were attacked in the afternoon. Subsequent testimony of German naval personnel captured at a later date indicated that Lieutenant Commander Prueher's aircraft was shot down by the combined AA of the submarines during his second bombing pass.
- 30 September – 1 December 1943: A squadron detachment deployed to RAF Ascension Island to maintain barrier air patrols and sweeps between Africa and Brazil. By 1 December 1943, the squadron's mission was shifted to barrier patrols in the South Atlantic narrows to intercept blockade runners.
- 5 November 1943: A VB-107 aircraft from the Ascension Island detachment piloted by Lieutenant Baldwin attacked U-848, in conjunction with two other squadron aircraft. Lieutenant Baldwin damaged the submarine sufficiently to prevent it from submerging. Lieutenant S. K. Taylor's aircraft administered the coup de grace, hitting the target on both bomb runs, causing it to blow up and sink within five minutes.
- 25 November 1943: A VB-107 aircraft attacked U-849. The sinking was confirmed by postwar review of enemy records.
- 1–2 January 1944: A VB-107 aircraft, 107-B-9, flown by Lieutenant M. G. Taylor, was on barrier patrol when he spotted a suspicious transport ship. When challenged, the ship opened fire with its AA, knocking out the number three engine and injuring the ordnance man. Lieutenant Taylor returned safely to Ascension Island as other squadron aircraft arrived on the scene to maintain contact with the ship. On 2 January a second VB-107 aircraft, 107-B-12, flown by Lieutenant Robert T. Johnson, attacked the blockade runner that had damaged Lieutenant Taylor's aircraft. The ship opened fire, causing minor damage to the aircraft. Lieutenant Johnson elected to remain on station until relieved. The plane ditched en route to base after three engines were lost. None of the crew were recovered. Squadron aircraft stayed on station until USS Somers arrived to sink the vessel by gunfire. The ship was the SS Wesserland headed for Germany with a load of crude rubber from the Far East.
- 6 February 1944: A VB-107 aircraft piloted by Lieutenant (jg) C. I. Purnell made two successful bomb runs on U-177. The sinking was confirmed by postwar review of enemy records.
- 14 March 1944: The squadron aircraft were updated to the Navy equivalent of the Army B-24J, with the ERCO nose turret. The firm that built the nose ball turret, Engineering and Research Company, retrofitted all Navy PB4Y-1 Liberator bombers at Litchfield Park, Arizona. Tail turrets of the same design were mounted as standard equipment on the PB2Y Coronado. Army versions of the J-model Liberator were equipped with the Emerson nose ball turret.
- 29 September 1944: Two VB-107 aircraft flown by Lieutenants E. A. Krug and J. T. Burton made a coordinated attack on U-863. The sinking was confirmed by postwar review of enemy records.
- 10 January – 4 June 1945: ComAirLant directed that VPB- 107 be redeployed from Natal, Brazil, to RAF Dunkswell, England, to assist RAF Coastal Command in the battle against the U-boats in the English Channel and Irish Sea. The squadron became operational, under the control of FAW-7 at RAF Upottery, Devon, England, on 21 January 1945. VPB-107 flew with 19 Group, RAF Coastal Command, until relieved on 4 June 1945.
- 4 June 1945: VPB-107 departed England aboard USS Albemarle en route to Norfolk, arriving back in the US on 14 June 1945. Rehabilitation leave was given to all hands in conjunction with transit orders to NAS Alameda, California.
- 21 July 1945: VPB-107 was reformed at NAS Alameda, and commenced transition training in the PB4Y-2 Privateer. Flight and operational training was based at NAAS Crows Landing, California, on 29 July 1945, and continued through 1 October 1945.
- 15 November 1946: VPB-107 was redesignated VP-HL-7, home-based at NAS Whidbey Island, Washington, under FAW-4.
- February 1949: VP-27 deployed to NAS Kodiak, Alaska.
- 11 January 1950: VP-27 was disestablished.

== Aircraft assignments ==
The squadron was assigned the following aircraft, effective on the dates shown:

- OS2U - September 1941
- PBY-5A - January 1942
- PB4Y-1 - May 1943
- PB4Y-2 - July 1945

== Home port assignments ==
The squadron was assigned to these home ports, effective on the dates shown:

- NAS Norfolk, Virginia - 15 September 1941
- Natal, Brazil 30 March 1942/8 June 1942
- NAS Norfolk - 1 May 1943
- Natal, Brazil - June 1943
- RAF Upottery, England 21 January 1945
- NAS Norfolk - 14 June 1945
- NAS Alameda, California - 21 July 1945
- NAAS Crows Landing, California - 29 July 1945
- NAS Whidbey Island, Washington - 1946

== See also ==
- Maritime patrol aircraft
- List of inactive United States Navy aircraft squadrons
- List of United States Navy aircraft squadrons
- List of squadrons in the Dictionary of American Naval Aviation Squadrons
- History of the United States Navy
