= No. 201 Flight RAAF =

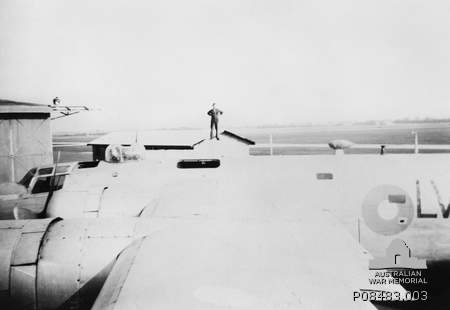
- An airman standing on top of a No. 201 Flight RAAF B-24 Liberator at RAAF Station Laverton
- Active: 1945–1946
- Country: Australia
- Branch: Royal Australian Air Force
- Type: Radio and radar experimentation

Insignia
- Squadron code: LV

Aircraft flown
- Electronic warfare: B-24 Liberator

No. 201 Flight was a Royal Australian Air Force experimental electronic intelligence flight of World War II. The flight was formed in March 1945 but the first of its modified B-24 Liberator heavy bombers was not ready until July that year. As a result, while a detachment of the unit was deployed to Darwin in the Northern Territory No. 201 Flight did not conduct any operational missions before the end of the war. Following the Japanese surrender some consideration was given to retaining the flight as part of the RAAF, but it instead ceased to function in December 1945 and was disbanded in March 1946.

== History ==
No. 201 Flight was formed at RAAF Station Laverton on 10 March 1945 as radio and radar experimentation unit. Its specific role was to use modified B-24 Liberator heavy bombers to determine the characteristics of Japanese radar stations so that they could be effectively attacked by Allied aircraft. These tasks were considered to be highly important and secret by the RAAF, and few people outside of No. 201 Flight knew that the unit existed. In order to further protect secrecy the flight's personnel were not briefed on the purpose of the unit and its aircraft beyond their individual responsibilities.

At the time it was formed No. 201 Flight was not issued with any aircraft. Its first two B-24s arrived on 5 and 27 April respectively and were transferred to No. 1 Aircraft Performance Unit (1 APU) to be modified for their specialised role. The main elements of these modifications were the removal of the ball turret and the addition of a radar scanning dome and fully enclosed radar operator's cabin. The aircraft were also fitted with an AN/APR-1 radar intercept receiver though it was hoped to replace these with AN/APR-4 sets. It took longer than expected to complete these modifications, and the first aircraft was not returned to No. 201 Flight until mid-July and the second aircraft was completed in either August or September. A third B-24 was also issued to the flight in August and a fourth aircraft joined it sometime afterwards.

A detachment of about 100 No. 201 personnel were transferred to Darwin in the Northern Territory to prepare for operations while the rest of the unit remained at Ascot Vale until the B-24s were ready. The deployment of these aircraft was further delayed by bad weather at Melbourne which disrupted No. 201 Flight's training program, however. Two modified B-24s had reached Darwin by the time the war ended in mid-August, but the flight had not been able to conduct any operational missions by this time.

In September No. 201 Flight's commanding officer, Wing Commander C.S. Davies, was informed by RAAF Headquarters that there were tentative plans to retain the unit at Laverton as part of the post-war RAAF. The Ascot Vale element of the flight moved to Laverton on 9 October, and the Darwin detachment arrived there on the 16th of the month. No. 201 Flight conducted some test flights during November but it was ultimately decided to disband the unit. The flight ceased to function on 17 December and was disbanded on 15 March 1946.

== See also ==
- B-24 Liberators in Australian service
