= VP-123 =

Patrol Squadron 123
- Active: 21 April 1943 – 1 October 1946
- Country: United States of America
- Branch: United States Navy
- Type: squadron
- Role: Maritime patrol
- Engagements: World War II

Aircraft flown
- Patrol: PV-1; PB4Y-1; PB4Y-2

VP-123 was a Patrol Squadron of the U.S. Navy. The squadron was established as Bombing Squadron 140 (VB-140) on 21 April 1943, redesignated Patrol Bombing Squadron 140 (VPB-140) on 1 October 1944, redesignated Patrol Bombing Squadron 123 (VPB-123) on 20 November 1944, redesignated Patrol Squadron 123 (VP-123) on 15 May 1946 and disestablished on 1 October 1946.

== Operational history ==
- 21 April 1943: VB-140 was established at NAS Alameda, California, as a bombing squadron flying the PV-1 Ventura. During training at Alameda the squadron came under the operational control of FAW8. Ground and flight training continued through mid-June 1943, when orders were received to begin preparations for the trans-Pacific flight to NAS Kaneohe Bay, Hawaii.
- 25 June 1943: VB-140 arrived at NAS Kaneohe Bay, coming under the operational control of FAW-2. Advanced combat training was undertaken along with operational patrols in the vicinity of the Hawaiian Islands.
- 25 August 1943 – 29 February 1944: The squadron completed its advanced training syllabus and began transit to Espiritu Santo, coming under the operational control of FAW-1. Almost immediately after its last aircraft had arrived at NOB Espiritu Santo, VB-140 was reassigned to the Solomon Islands, based in two detachments at NAB Henderson Field, Guadalcanal, and Munda, Solomons. During the Rabaul and Bougainville campaigns, the squadron came under the operational control of Strike Command, Commander Air Solomons. The detachment at Munda rejoined the squadron at Henderson Field on 29 February 1944.
- 8 April 1944: VB-140 was relieved for return to NAS Alameda. Upon arrival the squadron was given home leave.
- 22 May – 20 November 1944: VB-140 was reformed at NAS Alameda. Although the squadron had been scheduled to receive the new PV-2 Harpoon, backlogs in production resulted in a change of assignment to the more readily available PB4Y-1 Liberator. As a result of this last minute change, the squadron was transferred to NAS Hutchinson, Kansas, on 18 October 1944, for conversion training in the PB4Y-1. This training was completed in mid-November, and the squadron, now designated VPB-140, returned to NAS Alameda for ground training. Upon its arrival on 20 November 1944, the squadron was redesignated VPB-123.
- 18 December 1944: VPB-123 was transferred to NAAS Crows Landing, California, for additional operational flight training. The next day the squadron received its first PB4Y-2 Privateers.
- 6 February – April 1945: While the squadron was preparing for its trans-Pacific flight to NAS Kaneohe Bay, Chief of Naval Operations directed on 6 February that VPB squadrons 109, 123 and 124 of FAW-2 be equipped to employ the Bat (guided bomb) in combat. Final preparations for the trans-Pacific flight to NAS Kaneohe Bay began at the end of February. On 17 March 1945, one ground officer and 65 enlisted personnel departed NAS Alameda on board USS Altamaha for NAS Kaneohe Bay. Twelve crews and aircraft departed NAAF Crows Landing, arriving at NAS Kaneohe Bay on 20 March 1945. Upon its arrival the squadron began training in use of the new weapon. With the addition of this gear, one officer and 21 enlisted personnel were added to the squadron to maintain the equipment. Training in deployment of the Bat and advanced combat continued at NAS Kaneohe Bay through the end of April 1945.
- 6 April 1945: Lieutenant (jg) Terence P. Cassidy and his crew were ferrying a PB4Y-1 from California to NAS Kaneohe Bay when all four engines cut out during the approach to the field and the aircraft crashed in the ocean. Two crewmen were killed in the crash, but the remaining personnel safely exited the aircraft before it sank and were picked up by rescue vessels.
- 22–31 May 1945: The squadron deployed to the Marianas, arriving at NAB Tinian on 25 May 1945, coming briefly under the operational control of FAW18. By 31 May 1945, the squadron had arrived at Yontan Airfield, Okinawa, under the operational control of FAW-1. The squadron relieved the previous Bat-equipped squadron, VPB-109. This move placed the Bat-equipped aircraft within closer range of large ship targets near the Japanese home islands. Anti-shipping patrols were commenced off Korea, Tsushima Island, Getto Retto, Kyushu, Honshu and China. Nearly all combat patrols commenced immediately prior to daybreak, in two aircraft sections. Conditions at Yontan were extremely primitive. Tents were utilized for berthing and administrative spaces until mid-July, when Quonset huts became available for office use. Electrical power, rations and water were in short supply. Conditions did not improve until crews began rotation to Tinian for rest and relaxation. Returning crews brought back additional tents, food and recreational materials to ease the tedium at Yontan.
- 10–15 August 1945: The squadron’s last combat mission took place off the east coast of Korea. On 15 August 1945, all combat operations ceased. During a comparatively short tour of combat action, the squadron flew 230 combat missions sinking 67 enemy ships. There were no positive results from the deployment of the Bat with VPB-123. By the time the squadron arrived, few suitable targets for the missile were left. The pilots had minimal enthusiasm for the missile and preferred established bombing techniques to the new and relatively untried device. Many Bats were jettisoned by their crews without a target in sight.
- 25 August – September 1945: VPB-123 was transferred from Yontan Airfield to NAS Agana, Guam, coming under the operational control of FAW-18. The space at Yontan was needed by the USAAF in preparation for its Occupation of Japan. The squadron remained at NAS Agana until 6 September 1945, when it was relocated briefly back to Yontan Field, as a part of the Okinawa Landplane Search Unit.
- 10 September – October 1945: VPB-123 was relocated to NAB Yonabaru, Okinawa, to provide security patrols and typhoon tracking for the fleet. On 9 October 1945, a typhoon struck Okinawa, damaging the squadron’s buildings and tents, but with no damage to any of its aircraft. By the end of October, demobilization had reduced the squadron manpower to almost one third of its assigned strength. *19 November 1945: The squadron was relieved by VPB-128 for assignment to its new home port at NAS Barbers Point, Hawaii. The lack of maintenance facilities for the PB4Y-2 type of aircraft led to the reassignment of eight pilots to a photographic training course and conversion to the F6F-2P Hellcat. The remainder of the squadron formed its own maintenance group and received training from a CASU-2 detachment temporarily assigned to the squadron.
- 24 January – 5 February 1946: One VPB-123 crew was detached for photographic missions over Bikini Atoll, which was to be used at a later date in the nuclear weapons testing program.
- 19 February – 15 May 1946: VPB-123 was given the temporary duty of ferrying aircraft from NAS Kaneohe to the West Coast.
- 1 October 1946: VP-123 was disestablished at NAS Barbers Point.

== Aircraft assignments ==
The squadron was assigned the following aircraft, effective on the dates shown:

- PV-1 – April 1943
- PB4Y-1 – October 1944
- PB4Y-2 – December 1944

== Home port assignments ==
The squadron was assigned to these home ports, effective on the dates shown:

- NAS Alameda, California – 21 April 1943
- NAS Kaneohe Bay, Hawaii – 25 June 1943
- NAS Alameda, California – April 1944
- NAS Hutchinson, Kansas – 18 October 1944
- NAS Alameda – 20 November 1944
- NAAS Crows Landing, California – 18 December 1944
- NAS Kaneohe Bay – 20 March 1945
- NAS Barbers Point, Hawaii – 19 November 1945

== See also ==
- Maritime patrol aircraft
- List of inactive United States Navy aircraft squadrons
- List of United States Navy aircraft squadrons
- List of squadrons in the Dictionary of American Naval Aviation Squadrons
- History of the United States Navy
