= VP-62 (1942–1950) =

Patrol Squadron 62
- Active: 3 May 1942 – 30 January 1950
- Country: United States of America
- Branch: United States Navy
- Type: squadron
- Role: Maritime patrol
- Engagements: World War II

Aircraft flown
- Patrol: PBY-5/5A; SBD-3; J2F-5; PV-1; SNB-1/JRB-1/SNB-3P; SNJ-5; PB4Y-1/1P

VP-62 was a Patrol Squadron of the U.S. Navy. The squadron was established Fleet Air Photographic Squadron, Atlantic Fleet (FltAirPhotoRonLant), on 3 May 1942, redesignated Fleet Air Photographic Squadron 2 (FAPS-2) on 11 October 1942, redesignated Photographic Squadron 2 (VD-2) on 1 March 1943, redesignated Patrol Squadron (Photographic) 2 (VPP-2) on 15 November 1946, redesignated Patrol Squadron 62 (VP-62) on 1 September 1948 and disestablished on 30 January 1950. It was the third squadron to be designated VP-62, the first VP-62 was disestablished on 1 July 1943 and the second VP-62 was redesignated VPB-62 on 1 October 1944.

== Operational history ==
- 3 May 1942: FltAirPhotoRonLant was established at NAS Norfolk, Virginia, as a separate command under the operational control of Commander Patrol Wings, Atlantic Fleet. The squadron had already been in operation as a unit since 30 July 1941 flying a PBY-5 Catalina and SBD-3 Dauntless. The unit's mission prior to May 1942 was involved in completing an aerial survey in the Bahamas, Trinidad and Guantánamo Bay, Cuba. After its official establishment the squadron continued the survey of Great Exhuma and Hog Island in the Bahamas group.
- 1 March 1943: FAP-2 was redesignated VD-2. Until 13 May 1943, the squadron remained under Commander PatWingsLant. Subsequently, with the reorganization of Patrol Wings in 1943, the squadron came under the operational control of FAW-5.
- 16 August – 16 September 1943: A detachment of VD-2 deployed to the Canadian Arctic to conduct mapping and aerial surveys. Three squadron aircrews of six officer pilots and 16 enlisted personnel were assigned to conduct photographic mapping of Frobisher Bay, Koksoak River and Ungava Bay. Aircraft used in the task were a PBY-5A Catalina, PV-1 Ventura and an SNB-1. The detachment returned to NAS Norfolk on 16 September 1943.
- 17 September 1943: Depth charges being handled in Hangar V-30 by another squadron exploded, killing nine enlisted members of VD-2 and destroying half of the squadron's aircraft. The remaining aircraft were later moved to Hangar LP-2 for repairs. In the interim, squadron personnel were assigned to NAS Photographic Laboratory, Norfolk, Va., until VD-2 could again become operational.
- 1 January 1944: VD-2 conducted a split deployment, with one detachment mapping Haiti and the Dominican Republic, and the second detachment mapping Colombia and Venezuela. The squadron returned to NAS Norfolk at the end of April 1944.
- 1 March 1944: A special Aerial Mapping Unit detachment of six officers, six radiomen and eight photographers was transferred to Commander Fleet Air Wings, West Coast.
- 30 April 1944: A second detachment was formed from the ranks of VD-2 to staff a new Photographic Reconnaissance Training School at NAF New Cumberland, Pennsylvania. The school would train fleet officer and enlisted personnel in aerial survey and photographic mapping techniques. The detachment remained at NAF New Cumberland through September 1945.
- 12 May – 31 July 1944: The remaining detachment of the squadron deployed once again to the North Atlantic to conduct aerial surveys of southern Greenland, Frobisher Bay and Ungava Bay, Canada. The detachment returned to NAS Norfolk on 31 July 1944.
- 14 November –29 December 1944: VD-2 conducted a resurvey of selected areas of the north coast of Venezuela, the east and west coasts of British Honduras, Guatemala, El Salvador, Nicaragua, Costa Rica and Panama. The squadron returned to NAS Norfolk on 29 December 1944.
- 18 January – July 1945: VD-2 returned to Central America to conduct aerial surveys of the east and west coasts of Mexico. The squadron returned to NAS Norfolk in mid-July 1945.
- June 1946: VD-2 was relocated from NAS Norfolk to NAS Atlantic City, New Jersey. A few months earlier, the squadron had received seven PB4Y-1 Liberators to supplement the two SNB-1 Kansans and three SNJ-5 Texans in its normal operating complement.
- September 1946: With postwar reductions in effect, the squadron was reduced to a complement of eight aircraft: six PB4Y-1P Liberators and two SNB-1 Kansans.
- 15 November 1946: VD-2 was redesignated VPP-2. The squadron remained at NAS Atlantic City, with an operating complement of seven PB4Y-1P aircraft. The squadron's location, mission and composition remained relatively unchanged through May 1948.
- June 1948: VPP-2 was given a permanent change of station to NAS Patuxent River, Maryland. The authorized complement of aircraft remained at six PB4Y-1P Liberators, but the on-hand aircraft had dropped to only three PB4Y-1Ps and 1 SNB-3P Navigator.
- 1 September 1948: VPP-2 was redesignated VP-62, but its primary mission continued to be photographic reconnaissance and aerial mapping. The squadron complement of aircraft remained stable at approximately six operational aircraft on hand, usually five PB4Y-1P Liberators and one SNB-3P Kansan.
- 30 January 1950: VP-62 was disestablished.

== Aircraft assignments ==
The squadron was assigned the following aircraft, effective on the dates shown:

- PBY-5 - July 1941
- SBD-3 - September 1941
- J2F-5 May 1942
- PBY-5A - September 1943
- PV-1 - September 1943
- SNB-1 - September 1943
- JRB-1 - January 1946
- SNJ-5 - January 1946
- PB4Y-1 - March 1946
- PB4Y-1P - September 1946
- SNB-3P - June 1948

== Home port assignments ==
The squadron was assigned to these home ports, effective on the dates shown:

- NAS Norfolk, Virginia - 3 May 1942
- NAS Atlantic City, New Jersey - June 1946
- NAS Patuxent River, Maryland - June 1948

== See also ==
- Maritime patrol aircraft
- List of inactive United States Navy aircraft squadrons
- List of United States Navy aircraft squadrons
- History of the United States Navy
