= VP-HL-3 =

Heavy Patrol Squadron (Landplane) 3
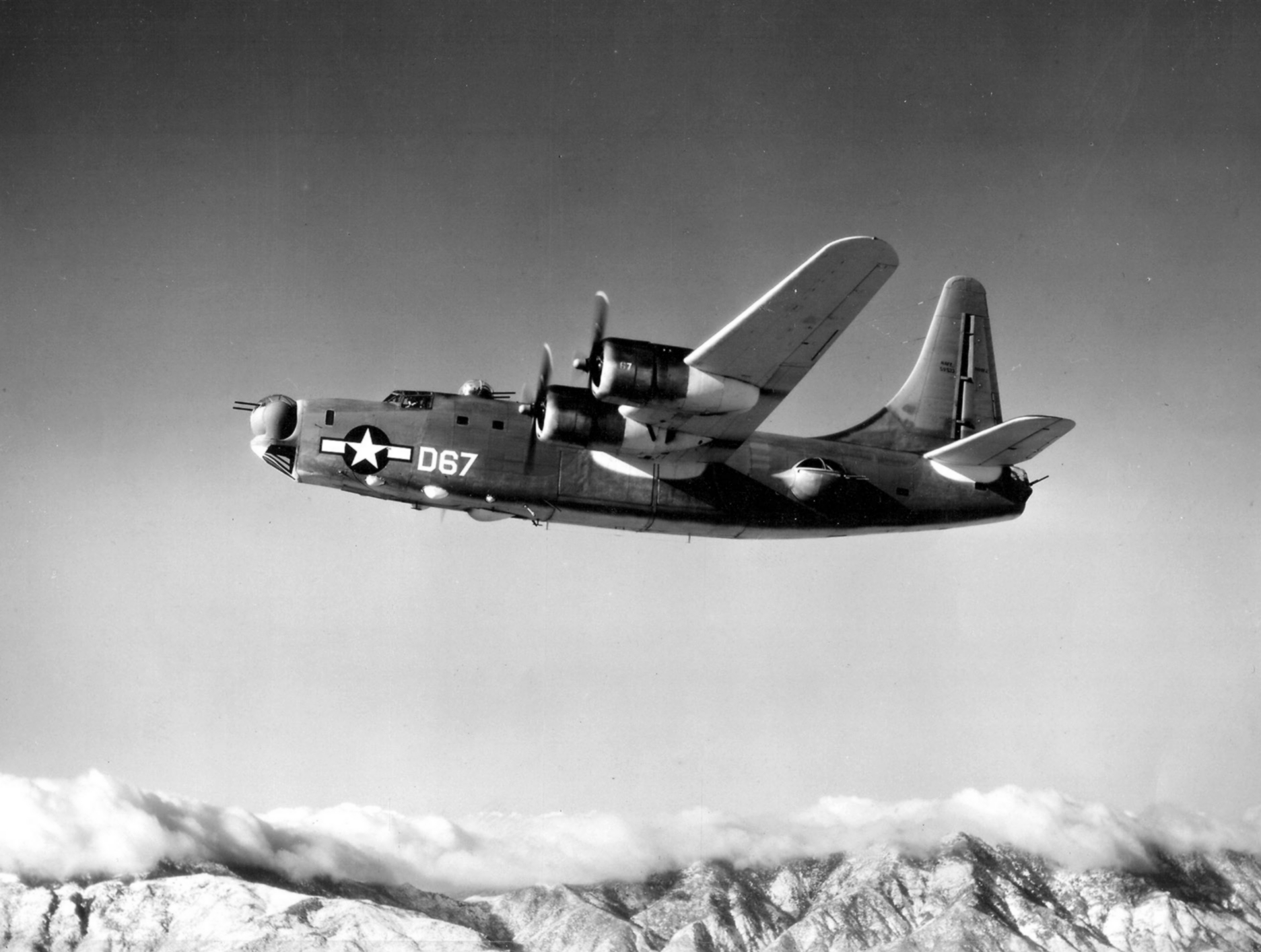
- VP-HL-3 PB4Y-2 c.1946
- Active: 15 March 1943 – 22 May 1947
- Country: United States of America
- Branch: United States Navy
- Type: Squadron
- Role: Maritime patrol
- Engagements: World War II

Aircraft flown
- Patrol: PV-1; PB4Y-1; PB4Y-2

VP-HL-3 was a Heavy Patrol Squadron (Landplane) of the U.S. Navy. The squadron was established as Bombing Squadron 138 (VB-138) on 15 March 1943, redesignated Patrol Bombing Squadron 138 (VPB-138) on 1 October 1944, redesignated Patrol Bombing Squadron 124 (VPB-124) on 15 December 1944, redesignated Patrol Squadron 124 (VP-124) on 15 May 1946, redesignated Heavy Patrol Squadron (Landplane) 3 (VP-HL-3) on 15 November 1946 and disestablished on 22 May 1947.

== Operational history ==
- 15 March 1943: VB-138 was established at Naval Air Station Whidbey Island, Washington, as a land-based bombing squadron flying the PV-1 Ventura twin-engine medium bomber. During training the squadron came under the operational control of FAW-6. Training continued through the end of June when the squadron received orders on the 28th to proceed to Naval Air Station Alameda, California, to await transportation to Naval Base Pearl Harbor, Hawaii.
- 14 May 1943: Lieutenant (junior grade) B. L. Lough and his crew were killed during a training flight when their Ventura crashed into Mount Washington during zero visibility conditions.
- 5 July – 27 September 1943: VPB-138 departed with all of its equipment from NAS Alameda aboard USS Pybus bound for Naval Air Station Pearl Harbor, Hawaii, arriving on 12 July. After unloading, the aircraft were flown to Naval Air Station Kaneohe Bay, Hawaii. Combat and operational training was begun immediately. On 27 July the squadron was divided into two echelons. A nine-aircraft detachment was sent to Kanton Island to serve as air cover for a photographic squadron that was charting enemy-held Baker Island. The remaining six aircraft stayed at NAS Kaneohe Bay to continue training. On 6 August 1943, Lieutenant Robert E. Slater and crew were killed in an accident during a torpedo run off Oahu. The five flight crews remaining at NAS Kaneohe Bay joined the rest of the squadron at Kanton on 10 August 1943. VB-138 returned to NAS Kaneohe Bay on 27 September 1943 and all aircraft were checked and given maintenance prior to deployment into the combat zone in the South Pacific.
- 15 October 1943: VB-138 was deployed to the Russell Islands under the operational control of FAW-1. For a three-month period the squadron conducted bombing missions and harassment raids on Japanese targets located on New Ireland and New Britain.
- 1 February 1944: VB-138 was transferred to Stirling Island. Bombing and harassment strikes were conducted as before, with several strikes on Rabaul. Antishipping sweeps and Dumbo (air-sea rescue) missions were conducted as mission requirements allowed.
- 22 February 1944: Lieutenant (junior grade) Anthony J. Ditter and one enlisted crewman were killed when their aircraft was shot down by enemy anti-aircraft (AA) fire over Cape St. George, New Ireland, while on a bombing mission. The remaining four crewmen were rescued at sea by a destroyer.
- 14–19 May 1944: The squadron was relieved at Stirling and flew back to NAS Kaneohe Bay, for transportation back to the West Coast aboard USS Atamaha. After arrival at NAS Alameda on 19 May 1944, squadron personnel were given home leave.
- 25 June – November 1944: VB-138 reformed at NAS Whidbey Island, flying the PV-1 Ventura as on the previous tour, but with transition to the newer model PV-2 Harpoon in the syllabus. During the training period the squadron came under the operational control of FAW-6. On 1 November 1944, the training syllabus on the PV-2 Harpoon was terminated due to production difficulties with the aircraft. All hands were transferred to Naval Air Station Hutchinson, Kansas, for conversion training to the PB4Y-1 Liberator. Ground personnel were separated from the squadron at Hutchinson on 17 November 1944 and flown to NAAS Brown Field, California, where they established the squadron headquarters.
- 15 December 1944: Flight training was completed at Hutchinson by mid-December, and the squadron was redesignated VPB-124. The flight crews departed NAS Hutchinson individually to report to NAAS Camp Kearney, California, where the squadron was reformed a second time and rejoined by its ground staff. VPB-124 came under the operational control of FAW-14 during this period. Seven PB4Y-2 Privateers and two PB4Y-1 Liberators were assigned to the squadron. Training over the next three months alternated between the airfield at Camp Kearney and NAAS San Nicholas Island off the coast of California.
- 3 January 1945: Lieutenant (junior grade) Thomas F. Pierce and his entire crew escaped serious injury after a forced landing during a night takeoff. The aircraft was declared a total loss.
- 6 February – May 1945: While the squadron was still undergoing training back in the U.S., Chief of Naval Operations directed that VPB squadrons 109, 123 and 124 be sent to FAW2 and be equipped to employ the Bat (guided bomb) in combat. On 1 April the ground staff of the squadron detached and departed aboard USS Bon Homme Richard for NAS Pearl Harbor, Hawaii. The flight crews departed NAAS Camp Kearney on 10 April for the trans-Pacific flight to NAS Kaneohe Bay. Upon its arrival at NAS Kaneohe Bay the squadron began training in use of the new weapon. Unfortunately, the Bat suffered from problems relating to the high humidity of the tropics and bugs characteristic of electronic devices of that period. Training in deployment of the Bat and advanced combat training continued at NAS Kaneohe Bay through the end of May 1945.
- 30 May 1945: VPB-124 departed NAS Kaneohe Bay for Naval Amphibious Base Tinian, arriving on 2 June 1945, under the operational control of FAW-18. Long-range searches and reconnaissance flights were begun immediately. On 6 June 1945, Lieutenant (junior grade) E. W. Osborn was forced to ditch his aircraft off the coast of Saipan after experiencing difficulty in transferring fuel from the bomb bay tanks. The crash resulted in the loss of one crewman. The remaining ten crewmen were picked up by the air-sea rescue unit based at Saipan.
- 16 June 1945: The squadron completed its duty assignment with FAW-18 and detached for duty with FAW-1 at Yontan Airfield, Okinawa. Here the squadron joined a second Bat-equipped squadron, VPB-123. This location was much closer to the Japanese home islands and presented a greater opportunity for strikes against large ship targets using the Bat. Unfortunately, a limited number of Bat missiles were available and the word was going around to the effect that the Bat wasn't living up to its advance billing. After getting settled the squadron began flying anti-shipping strikes and attacks against ground targets along the China coast, the Tsushima Strait and coastal regions of Korea and Kyushu, Japan.
- 26 June 1945: Both aircraft of a two-plane element, each carrying a crew of 12, failed to return from a long-range search mission along the China coast in the vicinity of Shanghai. The lead aircraft was flown by the commanding officer, Commander C. E. Houston, the second by Lieutenant (junior grade) J. R. Crist. All 24 personnel were listed as missing in action after negative searches for survivors (8 of the 12 crew in Commander Houston's aircraft survived the war as POWs, including Houston).
- 27 June 1945: Lieutenant J. E. Vincent and his crew were shot down by enemy AA fire over the southern coast of Korea with no survivors.
- 7 July 1945: Lieutenant R. J. Brower and crew were lost to enemy AA fire during an attack on an enemy sub chaser off the coast of Kyushu.
- 10 Jul 1945: Lieutenant G. E. Miller brought a badly damaged PB4Y-2 in for a wheels up crash landing at Yontan Airfield, after an attack on enemy ground installations. There were no injuries to the crew but the aircraft was written off.
- 24 July 1945: Both aircraft of a two-plane element, piloted by Lieutenants J. E. Ramsey and G. E. Miller, were lost during operations along the west coast of Korea. Searches for survivors were unsuccessful.
- 29 July 1945: The primitive living conditions at Yontan Airfield and the high casualty rate began to wear down the flight crews. Bat operations had ceased the month before because the squadron was reluctant to use the missile except under almost ideal conditions. However, two planes were loaded with a missile each day to stand by in preparation for a strike in case a suitable target was sighted. One aircraft did make two drops, one landing inside the turning circle of the target vessel. The second drop was obscured at the last minute by a cloud so that no hit could be claimed, even though smoke was seen rising above the position of the target. Squadron flight personnel were ordered to Tinian for a period of rest and rehabilitation, providing a break from combat operations.
- 10 August 1945: The squadron was ordered to vacate Yontan Airfield to make way for the increase in USAAF personnel and material inbound for the anticipated Occupation of Japan. VPB-124 headquarters and ground crew were moved to NAB Yonabaru, Okinawa, while the flight crews operated from the facilities at Tinian. From this location the squadron provided air cover for surrender of Truk and Marcus islands. With the Surrender of Japan on 15 August, the squadron began its demobilization with rotation of crews back to the West Coast. Remaining flight personnel engaged in routine patrols and weather flights in support of the fleet. On 8 September 1945, the flight crews detached from Tinian and FAW-18 to rejoin the headquarters stationed at NAB Yonabaru. In two months of combat the squadron had flown 124 combat missions, sinking 29 enemy ships with the loss of 18 officers, 54 enlisted personnel, and 9 aircraft.
- 12 December 1945: VPB-124 transferred from NAB Yonabaru to Naval Air Station Barbers Point, Hawaii. When the movement was completed on 18 December, the squadron came under the operational control of FAW2. By the end of the month the squadron was reduced from its complement of 12 aircraft to 9, and from 18 to 11 crews. Over the next several months the squadron was employed in ferrying over-age Privateers from NAS Kaneohe to the West Coast of the U.S. Several of the flight crews were demobilized when they ferried aircraft back to the States.
- 2 July 1946: The air-sea rescue activity in the Hawaiian area was disestablished in July and the rescue function was assumed by the operational patrol squadrons assigned to FAW-2. VPB-124 was assigned the Johnston Atoll station as its responsibility. One aircraft and crew were maintained on the island at all times, with duty being rotated among the crews each week. Ferrying duties continued, with several new Privateers being flown to Okinawa in exchange for worn out aircraft. Several of the latter were subsequently flown to the West Coast.
- 22 May 1947: VP-HL-3 was disestablished at NAS Barbers Point.

== Aircraft assignments ==
The squadron was assigned the following aircraft, effective on the dates shown:

- PV-1 - March 1943
- PB4Y-1 - November 1944
- PB4Y-2 - December 1944

== Home port assignments ==
The squadron was assigned to these home ports, effective on the dates shown:

- NAS Whidbey Island, Washington - 15 March 1943
- NAS Alameda, California - 28 June 1943
- NAS Kaneohe Bay, Hawaii - 12 July 1943
- NAS Alameda - 19 May 1944
- NAS Whidbey Island - 25 June 1944
- NAS Hutchinson, Kansas - 1 November 1944
- NAAS Brown Field, California - 17 November 1944
- NAAS Camp Kearney - 15 December 1944
- NAS Kaneohe Bay - April 1945
- NAS Barbers Point, Hawaii - 12 December 1945

== See also ==
- Maritime patrol aircraft
- List of inactive United States Navy aircraft squadrons
- List of United States Navy aircraft squadrons
- List of squadrons in the Dictionary of American Naval Aviation Squadrons
- History of the United States Navy
