= VP-106 =

Patrol Squadron 106
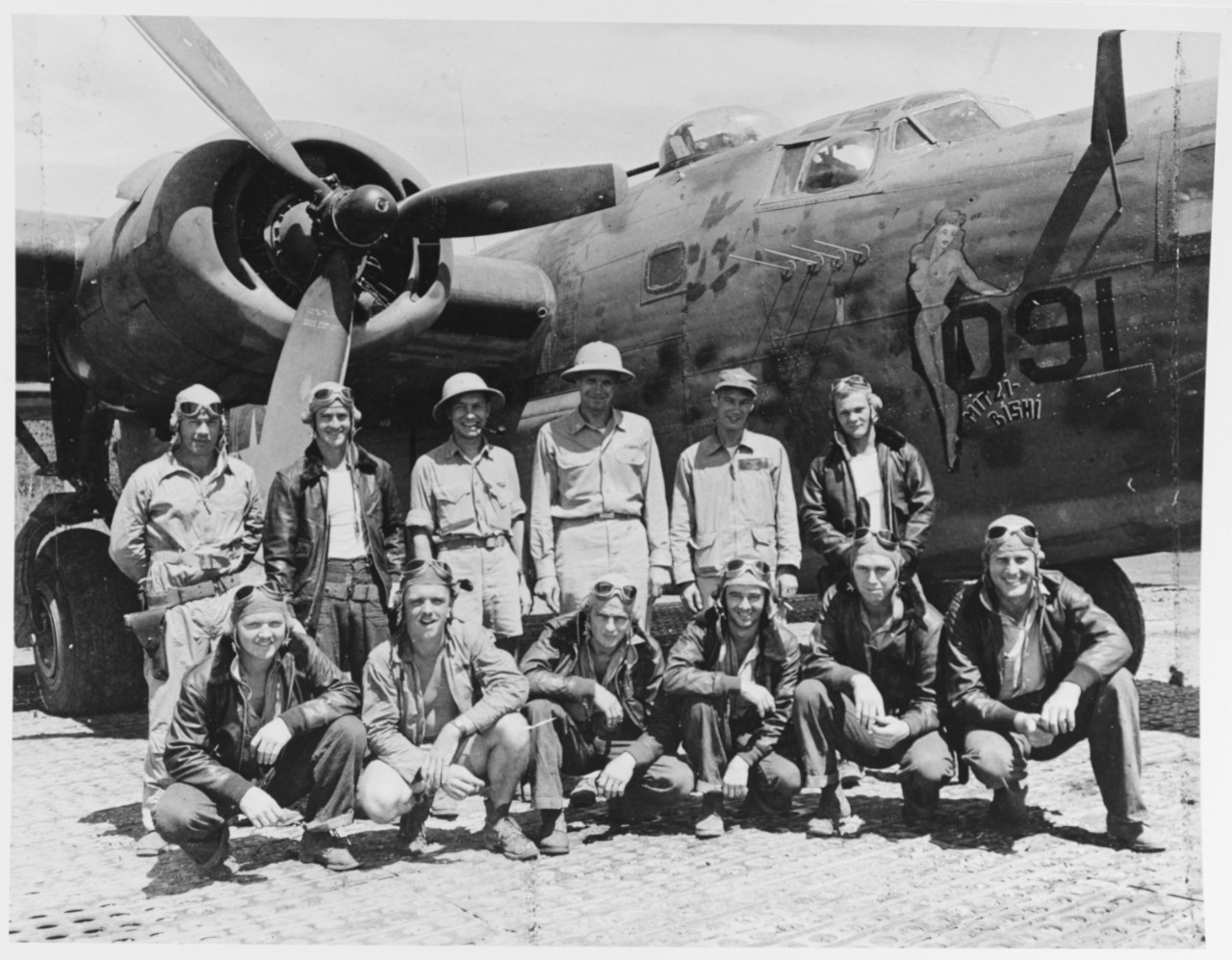
- Crew of one of the squadron's PB4Y-1 bombers, "Mitzi-Bishi"
- Active: 1 June 1943 – 5 October 1946
- Country: United States of America
- Branch: United States Navy
- Type: squadron
- Role: Maritime patrol
- Nickname(s): Wolverators
- Engagements: World War II

Aircraft flown
- Patrol: PB4Y-1; SNB-1; PB4Y-2

VP-106 was a Patrol Squadron of the U.S. Navy. The squadron was established as Bombing Squadron 106 (VB-106) on 1 June 1943, redesignated Patrol Bombing Squadron 106 (VPB-106) on 1 October 1944, redesignated Patrol Squadron 106 (VP-106) on 15 May 1946 and disestablished on 5 October 1946.

== Operational history ==
- 1 June 1943: VB-106 was established at NAAS Camp Kearney, California, under the operational control of Fleet Air Wing 14, as a heavy bombing squadron (landplane) flying the PB4Y-1 Liberator. The squadron conducted training at Camp Kearney through mid-August.
- 11 August 1943: The first of the squadron’s 15 assigned aircraft departed NAAS Camp Kearney, for the trans-Pacific flight to NAS Kaneohe Bay, Hawaii. The last aircraft arrived on the 20th, when the squadron officially came under the operational control of Fleet Air Wing 2.
- September – 9 October 1943: Combat training and routine operations continued through the end of September, when a detachment of six aircraft and nine crews was sent to Midway Island under TU 14.8.3, Commander Task Force 14. Strikes were conducted against Wake Island during this period. From 3 to 9 October 1943, the primary mission of the detachment was switched to long-range search and reconnaissance patrols.
- 7–22 October 1943: Eleven aircraft and crews were deployed to Kanton Island. During this period the squadron flew two sorties as escort for VD-3 on photographic and bombing runs against Makin Island (12–13 October) and Funafuti (18–19 October). Under the initial acceptance program, Liberators received for Navy patrol squadron use had been the early Army versions (B-24D) without a powered nose turret. Reports from the combat zone had shown that Liberator squadrons with 30-caliber nose guns were sustaining very high casualty rates. PB4Y-1 Liberators destined for Navy use did not get the refit with the ERCO 250SH-1 powered turrets with twin 50-caliber gun mounts until after May 1943. VB-106 had its 15 assigned aircraft modified at the factory starting in June 1943, and highly endorsed it, suggesting in a letter to Chief of Naval Operations that it be installed in all Navy Liberators. On 18 October 1943, the squadron suffered its first operational loss when one of its aircraft crashed at sea 400 miles (640 km) southwest of Kanton Island with the loss of all hands.
- 28 October 1943 – 5 February 1944: The squadron detachments were reunited at NAS Kaneohe Bay for deployment to Carney Field, Guadalcanal. Upon arrival on 2 November 1943, the squadron came under the operational control of FAW-1. The squadron flew 11 sorties on special night-snooper flights, and bombed enemy installations at Kapingamarangi Atoll on 8, 17, 25, and 27 November 1943. On 5 February 1944, VB-106 was transferred to Munda Field, New Georgia.
- 1 November 1943 – 24 March 1944: Lieutenant Douglas C. Davis was awarded the Navy Cross for his actions against the Japanese during the period November 1943 to March 1944. On 13 November 1943, in cooperation with another pilot from his squadron, he successfully destroyed five seaplanes and bombed and strafed the docks and supply areas at Kapigamarangi Island. He attacked and destroyed an enemy seaplane in aerial combat on 3 January 1944 while within sight of enemy fighter strips at Kavieng, New Ireland. On 7 February 1944 he led his crew in a single plane attack against the strong enemy base at Satawan Island which was over 800 miles (1,300 km) from his home base of operations. He successfully destroyed a large fuel dump, an anti-aircraft (AA) gun crew and inflicted other serious damage to the base.
- 25 March – 1 June 1944: VB-106 was transferred to Nadzab, New Guinea, under the operational control of FAW-17. On 12 April 1944, the squadron was transferred again to Momote Field, Los Negros, remaining there until 1 June 1944, when it was sent to Wakde Island. Six aircraft were lost to accidents without casualties during this period, with one aircraft lost to enemy action off Biak Island on 1 May 1944. In this action a VB-106 Liberator piloted by Lieutenant Allen L. Seaman made repeated attacks on shipping in the harbor in the face of strong AA fire. Lieutenant Seaman was severely wounded by the ground fire and the aircraft badly damaged. He was able to crash-land the aircraft, enabling several crewmen to escape while losing his own life. Lieutenant Seaman was posthumously awarded the Navy Cross for his gallant actions. For his actions during operations conducted from 1 November 1943 through 24 March 1944, Lieutenant Seaman was later posthumously awarded a gold star in lieu of a second Navy Cross.
- 1 June 1944: VB-106 received orders to return to NAS San Diego, California, for home leave and reforming in July. The squadron combat record listed 16 enemy aircraft shot down and 43 ships sunk at the conclusion of the tour.
- 14 July 1944: VB-106 personnel were reformed at NAS San Diego, then moved to NAAS Camp Kearney for ground and flight training on 17 July. Training was begun with one PB4Y-1 Liberator and one SNB-1 Kansan, followed later by the new PB4Y-2 Privateers as they became available. The Kansan was written off the inventory on 27 July when the commanding officer, Lieutenant Commander W. S. Sampson, was forced to execute a wheels-up landing due to gear failure. The remaining highlight of this period was the first ditching of a PB4Y-2 Privateer on 24 October 1944, in the Gulf of Baja, in Mexican waters. The aircraft ran out of fuel during a long-range training mission in bad weather. All crew members, including the squadron canine mascot, exited the aircraft safely and were picked up by fishermen after four days at sea. As a result of the crash, improvements in aircraft exits by the manufacturer, Consolidated-Vultee Aircraft Corporation, saved many lives in subsequent ditchings. Training was completed by mid-November and on 23 November an advance echelon departed by ship for NAS Kaneohe Bay. Poor weather delayed the squadron's trans-Pacific flight until 5 December 1944. The last squadron aircraft arrived at NAS Kaneohe Bayon 21 December.
- 14–19 December 1944: Despite the delay in arrival of all the squadron’s aircraft, combat training was begun immediately with the crews at hand. On 19 December 1944, Lieutenant (jg) B. H. Knust, in a PB4Y-1 training aircraft, made a forced landing at sea when both starboard engines caught fire. Eight crew members in the forward section survived, but six enlisted personnel in the aft section went down with the aircraft.
- February – March 1945: On 10 February the squadron began deployment to NAB Tinian, coming under the operational control of FAW-1. Upon arrival, the squadron found it was sharing the airfield with the 21st USAAF Bomber Command. USAAF headquarters requested that three VPB-106 officers accompany a B-29 flight of three aircraft within radar range of Tokyo preparatory to the attack by TF 58 on the Tokyo area. The three naval officers served as naval observers for recognition and communication in the event of enemy contact. No enemy was encountered. Long-range reconnaissance patrols for VPB-106 commenced on the 16th. Photographic missions were flown over Truk Island on 20 February. The squadron’s first action against the enemy during this deployment occurred on 26 February, when it encountered enemy picket boats at the extreme end of a patrol leg near the Borodino Islands. A similar encounter on 9 March near the Japanese mainland off Honshu resulted in the loss of Lieutenant (jg) E. W. Ashley and his crew. In March 1945 the squadron began using the newly acquired airfield at Iwo Jima for staging of long-range flights toward Japan. Snipers at Iwo Jima damaged two squadron aircraft during this period, wounding an officer onboard one aircraft during a landing. Attacks against enemy picket boats in conjunction with the rocket-equipped PV-1 Venturas of VPB-151 sank or damaged several of the vessels. During these actions the squadron had eight VPB-106 Privateers damaged and one lost with all hands.
- 8 April 1945: A detachment of six to eight aircraft was maintained at Iwo Jima for sector coverage extending from the southernmost Japanese home islands to the northern Bonin Islands. Although frequent attacks against Japanese shipping continued, enemy air activity was notable only by its absence. Japanese aircraft were spotted on only two occasions, with both fleeing into cloud cover upon spotting a Privateer.
- 3 May – 14 June 1945: VPB-106 was transferred to Palawan, commencing operations on the 6th. Attacks against surface shipping continued, with considerably increased air activity on the part of the enemy. On 1 June 1945, Lieutenant Commander H. F. Mears and crew were shot down over Singapore by enemy fighters. Mears was leading a two-plane section to obtain reconnaissance photos of the shipping in Singapore Harbor. For his sacrifice Lieutenant Commander Mears was posthumously awarded the Navy Cross. On 14 June 1945, Lieutenant Commander G. C. Goodloe, squadron executive officer, and crew received damage during an attack on shipping in the vicinity of the Gulf of Siam. Goodloe attempted to reach Rangoon with one engine out, but was later reported missing in action.
- 6–30 July 1945: Heavy rains and repair work on the runway at Palawan resulted in detachments from both VPB-106 and VPB-111 (PB4Y-1s) being assigned to Mindoro. Missions were conducted along the Malay coast and in the vicinity of Singapore, but enemy shipping remained sparse. On 30 July, Lieutenant J. W. Swiencicki and crew number 7 were reported missing during a patrol beyond the southern tip of Indochina. An unexplained increase in enemy air activity in that area occurred during this period, which may have resulted in the loss of the bomber.
- 10–11 August 1945: The last combat patrol was flown on 10 August 1945. On the 11th the squadron was ordered to fly non-offensive patrols in light of the Surrender of Japan. During this period crews began rotational relief back to the U.S.
- 5 October 1946: After the war VP-106 remained operating in the Pacific under FAW-10 until it was officially disestablished on this date.

== Aircraft assignments ==
The squadron was assigned the following aircraft, effective on the dates shown:

- PB4Y-1 - June 1943
- SNB-1 - July 1943
- PB4Y-2 - August 1944

== Home port assignments ==
The squadron was assigned to these home ports, effective on the dates shown:

- NAAS Camp Kearney, California - 1 June 1943
- NAS Kaneohe Bay, Hawaii - 11 August 1943
- NAS San Diego, California - June 1944
- NAAS Camp Kearney -17 July 1944
- NAS Kaneohe Bay - 5 December 1944
- Samar - 1945

== See also ==
- Maritime patrol aircraft
- List of inactive United States Navy aircraft squadrons
- List of United States Navy aircraft squadrons
- List of squadrons in the Dictionary of American Naval Aviation Squadrons
- History of the United States Navy
