= NASA Crows Landing Airport =

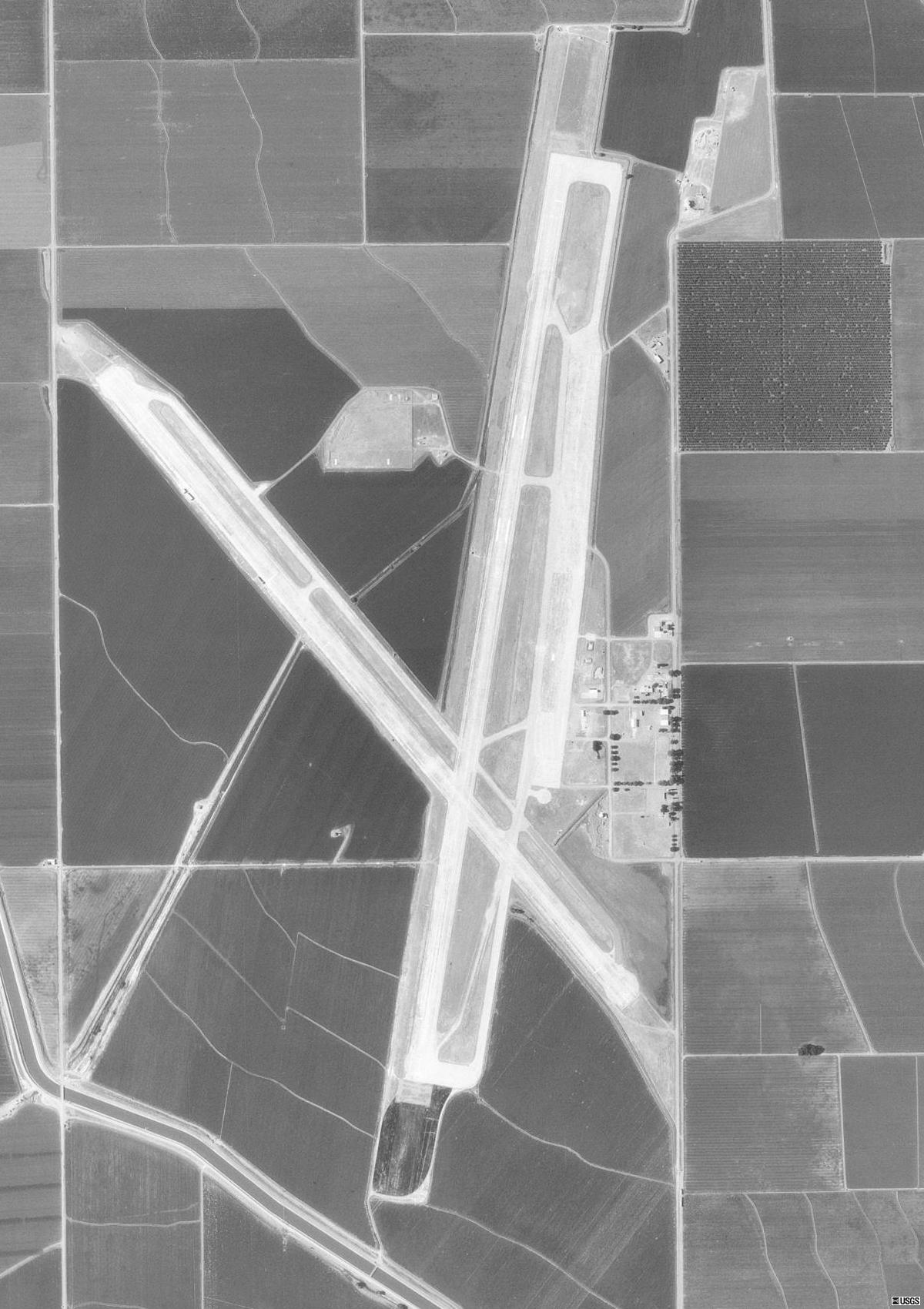
- USGS aerial image - 29 July 1999
- IATA: NRC; ICAO: KNRC; FAA LID: NRC

Summary
- Airport type: Private
- Owner: NASA Ames Research Center
- Location: Crows Landing / Patterson, California
- Elevation AMSL: 166 ft / 51 m
- Coordinates: 37°24′29″N 121°06′34″W
- Interactive map of NASA Crows Landing Airport

Runways
Direction	Length		Surface
Direction	ft	m	Surface
12/30	6,975	2,126	Concrete
17/35	7,950	2,423	Concrete
- Source: Federal Aviation Administration

NASA Crows Landing Airport (IATA: NRC, ICAO: KNRC, FAA LID: NRC) is a private use airport owned by the NASA Ames Research Center, 1 nautical mile (1.9 km; 1.2 mi) northwest of the central business district of Crows Landing, in Stanislaus County, California, United States. The airfield was formerly named Naval Auxiliary Landing Field Crows Landing or NALF Crows Landing when operated by the U.S. Navy. In January 2011, Airport-data.com reported the airport status as closed permanently. In March 2022, Stanislaus County announced the former airfield would be redeveloped into a business park.

In late 1942, the Crows Landing airfield was operated as an auxiliary air station to Naval Air Station, Alameda, and was used to train Navy fighter pilots. Pilots of F4F Wildcats, TBF and TBM Avengers trained here first in Link and Panoramic trainers, then eventually in actual planes. Later, pilots in R4D Skytrains and R5D Skymasters (Navy versions of the Army's C-47 and C-54) trained here. After the war the station was placed in caretaker status.

By the year 2000, the Navy had completed an EPA cleanup project and transferred most of the facilities to Stanislaus County with plans to convert it into a business park. As of 2013, the County (with NASA partners) had cleared all of the abandoned and decaying building structures save for the historic control tower.

During 1956 and 1957 this base trained pilots from Moffett Field to land on carriers. They also trained pilots in the use of TACAN for navigation.

== Facilities ==
The airport has two runways with concrete surfaces: 12/30 is 6,975 by 200 ft (2,126 by 61 m), and 17/35 is 7,950 by 200 ft (2,423 by 61 m).

== History ==
Naval Auxiliary Air Station Crows Landing
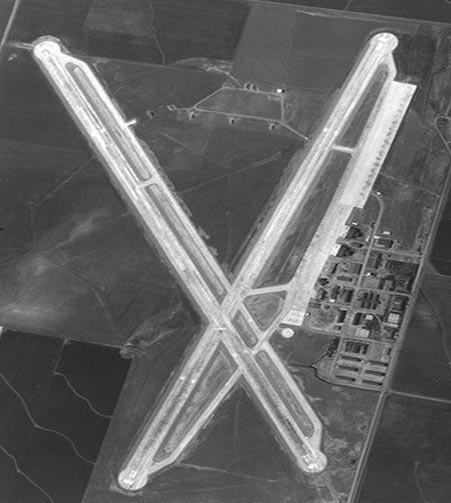
- Aerial view of NAAF Crows Landing, 1947
- IATA: NRC; ICAO: KNRC; FAA LID: NRC

Summary
- Airport type: Military: Naval Auxiliary Air Station
- Operator: United States Navy
- Location: Crows Landing / Patterson, California
- In use: 1943–1993
- Elevation AMSL: 166 ft / 51 m
- Coordinates: 37°24′29″N 121°06′34″W
- Interactive map of Naval Auxiliary Air Station Crows Landing

Runways
Direction	Length		Surface
Direction	ft	m	Surface
12/30	6,975	2,126	Concrete
17/35	7,950	2,423	Concrete
- Source: Federal Aviation Administration

In late 1942, the Navy chose a site in the San Joaquin Valley, 71 miles southeast of NAS Alameda, for an auxiliary air station. An 804-acre parcel of land was purchased for $86,708, and ground was broken on December 1, 1942. The site was located near the agricultural community of Crows Landing, with a 1940 population of 363, which consisted of a gas station, general store, and a freight train stop. During construction, the project was known as NAAF Patterson for the nearest post office, six miles to the north. After the Navy decided to include a post office on the station, the base was commissioned on May 25, 1943, as NAAF Crows Landing.

On 18 June 1943, VC-36 became the first unit assigned. A detachment of Alameda's CASU 6 also arrived in support. For the next nine months, Crows Landing hosted various carrier units. These units included VC-65, and elements of CAG 28, CAG 18, and CAG 11. In the meantime, a detachment of CASU 37 replaced CASU 6 and Crows Landing was upgraded to an NAAS. Up to the spring of 1944, multi-engine patrol aircraft were based at NAAS Vernalis, 18 miles to the northwest. The Navy realized that Crows Landing's 7,000-ft. concrete runways would be better suited for the heavier weight multi-engine aircraft than Vernalis's asphalt runways; thereafter, Vernalis was designated for carrier units and Crows Landing for multi-engine types.

In March 1944, the first multi-engine squadron, VPB-137, arrived from Alameda with PVs. From June to November, the station embarked on an expansion project that added housing, a hangar, and other improvements. The runways were widened from 150 to 200 ft. The station's ramp that initially was 200 x 400 ft. was enlarged by a 1200 x 200-ft. and a 1890 x 260-ft. section. In August 1944, the first PB4Y-2 Privateer squadron, VPB-118, arrived from Camp Kearny. In January 1945, Crows Landing added six enlisted barracks, a warehouse, and a 100-man ground training building. From February 2, to March 27, 1945, a VRE-1 Detachment with 12 R4Ds was based at the station. VRE-1 was one of the Navy's three evacuation squadrons that transported wounded men from combat areas in the South Pacific to the various naval hospitals in the U.S. In addition, Oakland's VR-4 and VR-11 used Crows Landing for training throughout the station's existence.

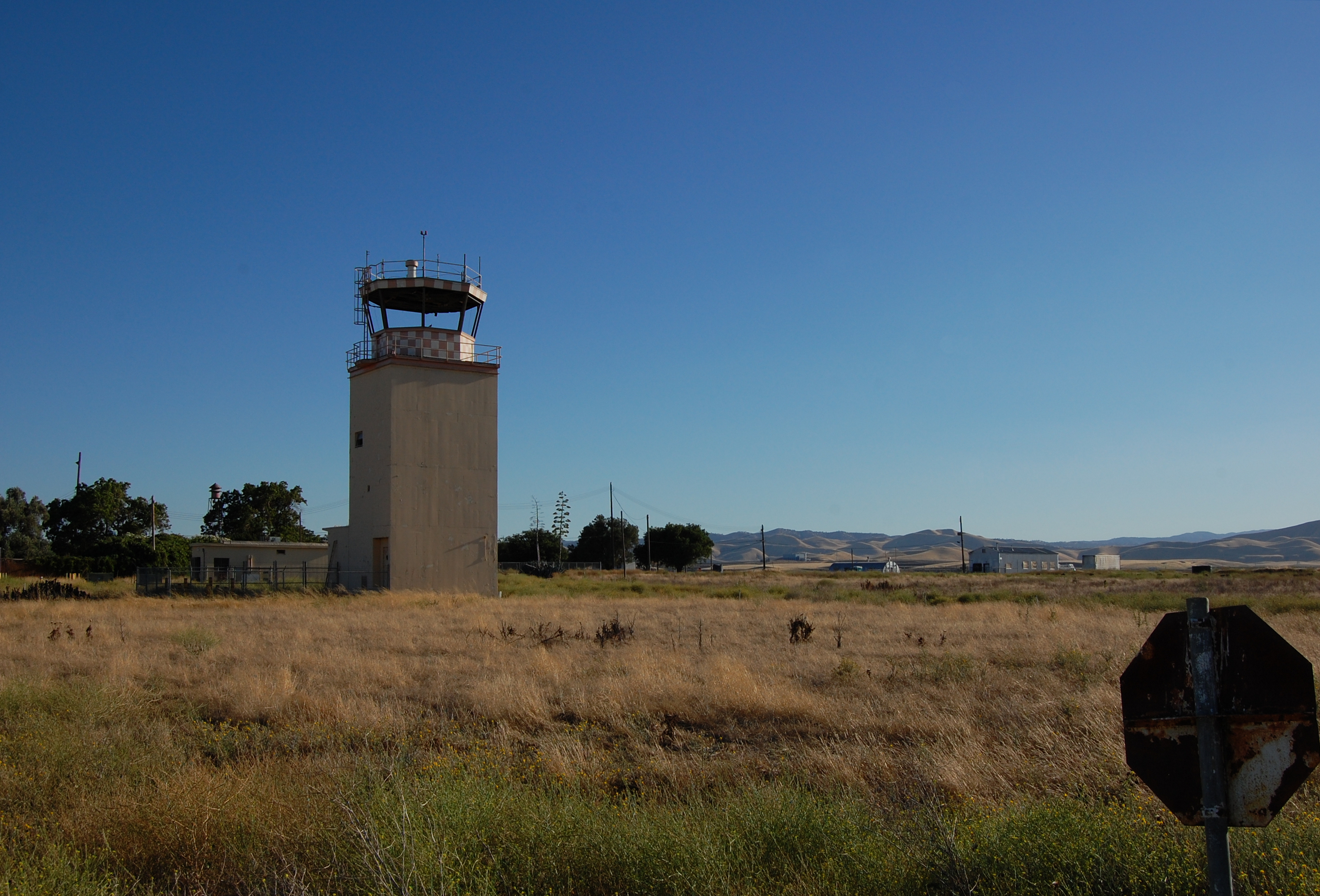
Control tower of Crows Landing in 2011

Crows Landing's isolated location prompted the Navy to run ten liberty buses a day to Modesto and Patterson. Navy men were allowed to use the swimming pool at Patterson High School. In June 1945, the station's complement stood at 27 officers and 185 men – squadron personnel added an additional 245 officers and 1220 enlisted men. Available billeting accommodated 268 officers and 2116 men. Patrol squadrons that passed thought the station during the war included VPB-115, 122, 101, 103, 107, 133, 140, 118, and 108. The PV operational training squadron, VPB-198, also spent time aboard. Patrol squadrons were supported by PATSUs 8-2, 8-4, 8-5, and 8-7. Other units that operated and trained at Crows Landing were VJ-12 and ABATU 105. By war's end, the station was valued at $4 million.

Crows Landing was decommissioned on 6 July 1946, becoming an OLF (Outlying Field) to Alameda and later Moffett Field near Sunnyvale. In recent years, the Navy maintained a permanent detachment at the field that supplied crash equipment and refueling services for naval aircraft from the stations in the area. With the closing of Moffett, the Navy turned Crows Landing over to NASA's Ames Research Center in 1993.
