= 1946 in aviation =

This is a list of aviation-related events from 1946:

== Events ==
- The American Section of the International League of Aviators resurrects the National Trophy, a Harmon Trophy awarded from 1926 to 1938 to the outstanding aviator of the year in each of the 21 member countries of the now-defunct League. It will be awarded until 1949 amid much controversy, with the awards going largely unrecognized.
- The Electric Boat Company purchases Canadair from the Government of Canada, an important step toward the 1952 founding of General Dynamics Corporation.
- The Bureau d'Enquêtes et d'Analyses pour la Sécurité de l'Aviation Civile (BEA), or Bureau of Investigation and Analysis for Civil Aviation Safety, is formed as the French government agency responsible for investigating aviation accidents and incidents and making safety recommendations based on what is learned from those investigations.
- The Nicaraguan airline LANICA begins flight operations.

=== January ===
- Aeropostal Alas de Venezuela (LAV) inaugurates its second international route, offering service between Venezuela and Aruba in the Netherlands East Indies. The route connects LAV with KLM′s international route structure.
- January 1
  - A British South American Airways Avro Lancastrian becomes the first commercial flight to depart from London Heathrow Airport.
  - East African Airways begins flight operations.
  - Middle East Airlines begins flight operations, flying three de Havilland DH.89A Dragon Rapides between Beirut, Lebanon, and Nicosia, Cyprus.
- January 6 – Pennsylvania Central Airlines Flight 105, a Douglas DC-3-393, crashes while landing at Birmingham Municipal Airport in Birmingham, Alabama, killing three and injuring five of the 19 people on board.
- January 8 – The U.S. Joint War Plans Committee reports that by July 1946, as a result of post-World War II demobilization, the United States Army Air Forces will have only five heavy bomber groups in Europe, with only a 65-percent readiness level, and a reserve force of five heavy bomber groups in the United States, with only a 20-percent readiness level. It also reports that the United States Navy will have 13 aircraft carriers at a high state of readiness by that time. It finds that in the event of war with the Soviet Union, the only effective American response will be the delivery of atomic bombs by aircraft of the U.S. Army Air Forces and the United States Navy, and recommends atomic strikes by Army Air Forces B-29 Superfortress bombers based in England; Foggia, Italy; Agra, India; and Chengdu, Republic of China, on 17 Soviet cities to target administrative and research and development centers and aircraft and munitions factories, with an expectation of a B-29 loss rate of 35 percent. It recommends an inventory of 196 atomic bombs in order to carry out this campaign.
- January 10 – A Sikorsky R5 sets an unofficial helicopter altitude record of 6,400 m (21,000 ft) at Stratford, Connecticut.
- January 12 – The U.S. Joint Chiefs of Staff note that the use of atomic bombs alone will be insufficient to defeat the Soviet Union in the event of a war, and that substantial conventional air, ground, and naval forces will remain necessary.
- January 14 – Pan American Airways becomes the first airline to offer transatlantic Lockheed Constellation service, beating its rival Transcontinental & Western Air in providing transatlantic Constellation service by three weeks.
- January 18 – The most decorated United States Navy ship of World War II, the aircraft carrier USS Enterprise (CV-6), arrives at Bayonne, New Jersey, completing the second of her two round-trip voyages between the New York City area and Southampton, England, to bring American military personnel back to the United States as part of Operation Magic Carpet. She never puts to sea again.
- January 26 – United States Army Air Forces Colonel William Councill sets a new U.S. transcontinental speed record of 4 hours 13 minutes in a Lockheed P-80 Shooting Star.
- January 28 – Iraqi Airways begins flight operations, offering a service to Syria using five De Havilland Dragon Rapides.

=== February ===
- Misr Airlines, the future EgyptAir, ceases all flight operations until May because of three accidents in late 1945 and resulting strikes demanding that the airline acquire newer, safer aircraft.
- February 4 – Pan American Airways begins its first transatlantic landplane service, scheduling seven Douglas DC-4 flights per week from LaGuardia Airport in New York City to Hurn Airport at Bournemouth in England and two per week between LaGuardia Airport and Lisbon, Portugal. The flights to Bournemouth take 17 hours 40 minutes one-way and those to Lisbon take 20 hours 45 minutes one-way. The flights are a great advance over Pan Am's one-every-two-week Boeing 314 flying boat service from LaGuardia to Lisbon, which requires 29 hours 30 minutes one way, and the airline soon ends flying boat service.
- February 5 – Transcontinental and Western Air, the future Trans World Airlines, inaugurates its first international service, using Lockheed Constellations on the route New York City–Gander, Newfoundland–Shannon, Ireland–Paris, France.
- February 8 – Trans Australia Airlines is founded. It will begin flight operations in September.
- February 11 – After lengthy negotiations, American and British government representatives reach the Bermuda Agreement, the first bilateral agreement regulating international commercial air transport. Agreement also is reached for the International Air Transport Association (IATA) to coordinate and fix international air fares.
- February 14 – Using Douglas DC-4s, National Airlines launches both the first nonstop service between Miami, Florida, and New York City and the first four-engined commercial flights between the two cities.
- February 25–26 (overnight) – Jewish guerrillas attack three Royal Air Force bases in the British Mandate of Palestine simultaneously. The attacks destroy 22 Handley Page Halifaxes, seven Supermarine Spitfires, and four Avro Ansons.

=== March ===
- March 3 – The second jet fighter to serve in the Royal Air Force, the De Havilland Vampire, enters service with 247 Squadron.
- March 8 – The Bell 47 receives the world's first type certificate awarded to a civil helicopter.
- March 9 – The United States Army Air Forces establish the Air Materiel Command.
- March 10 – The Australian National Airways Douglas DC-3 VH-AET crashes into Frederick Henry Bay off Seven-Mile Beach south of Cambridge Aerodrome just after takeoff from Hobart, Tasmania, Australia, killing all 25 people on board. At the time it is the second-deadliest aviation accident and deadliest civil aviation accident in Australian history.
- March 12 – The U.S. Army Air Forces redesignate the Army Air Forces School at Maxwell Field, Alabama, as the Air University.
- March 14 – The Royal Canadian Navy commissions its first aircraft carrier, HMCS Warrior (CVL 20), which the United Kingdom has transferred to Canada. She will serve until replaced by HMCS Magnificent (CVL 21) in 1948.
- March 18
  - The U.S. Army Air Forces Martin B-26B Marauder Flak-Bait flies for the last time, landing at Oberpfaffenhofen, Germany. First flown in April 1943, the plane operated for two years in the 449th Bombardment Squadron over Belgium, France, Germany, and the Netherlands during World War II, logging 725 hours of combat flying time in 202 bombing missions and five decoy missions — including operations during the Normandy landings, Operation Crossbow, and the Battle of the Bulge — and shooting down one German plane. It suffers over a thousand hits during the war, returning to base twice on one engine (once with the disabled engine on fire), once with its electrical system knocked out, and twice with its hydraulic system shot out, but only one crew member is wounded and none killed. Its 207 combat sorties are the most of any U.S. Army Air Forces aircraft that survived World War II.
  - Orvis Nelson Air Transport makes its first flight, an Air Transport Command contract flight between San Francisco and Honolulu using a C-54 Skymaster. It will incorporate as Transocean Air Lines on May 21.
- March 21 – A major reorganization of the United States Army Air Forces creates the Strategic Air Command, the Air Defense Command, and the Tactical Air Command.
- March 23 – The Royal Netherlands Navy commissions its first aircraft carrier, the escort carrier HNLMS Karel Doorman (QH1). Formerly the British carrier HMS Nairana, she will serve until replaced in 1948 by the fleet carrier HNLMS Karel Doorman (R81).
- March 29 – Maszovlet (the Hungarian-Soviet Civil Air Transport Joint Stock Company) is founded as Hungary's first post-World War II airline. In November 1954 it will be renamed Malév Hungarian Airlines.
- March 31
  - The U.S. Joint Chiefs of Staff assess that a U.S. atomic arsenal and bombers capable of delivering it promptly could deter the Soviet Union from launching a war.
  - Transcontinental and Western Air inaugurates international service from the United States to Rome, Athens, and Cairo.

=== April ===
- April 5
  - Brewster Aeronautical Corporation is dissolved by its shareholders.
  - A Fleet Air Arm Vickers Wellington, HE274, crashes into a residential area in Rabat, Malta during a training exercise, killing all 4 crew members and 16 civilians on the ground.
- April 9 - The Indonesian Air Force is founded by Indonesian Republican forces in the Netherlands East Indies. Initially it is equipped with a limited number of small aircraft left behind by Japanese military forces at the end of World War II.

=== May ===
- Pacific Ocean Airlines initiates air passenger service between the continental United States and Hawaii.
- Misr Airlines, the future EgyptAir, resumes flight operations. It had suspended flights in February because of three accidents in late 1945 and resulting strikes demanding that the airline acquire newer, safer aircraft.
- May 1 – Transcontinental and Western Air inaugurates international service from the United States to Lisbon and Madrid.
- May 16 – A Viking Air Transport DC-3 NC53218 on a flight to Atlanta returned to Byrd Field at Richmond, Virginia with a rough engine when it crashed and burned, killing all 27 on board. The crew failed to: inspect the engines despite trouble on the prior flight, identify the right engine as the trouble, retract the landing gear after an earlier landing attempt and feather the propeller on the failed engine. The captain was on the job a week and allowed himself to be persuaded by the first officer (part owner of the company) to continue into adverse weather.
- May 20 – A United States Army Air Forces Beechcraft C-45F Expediter flying in fog from Lake Charles Army Air Field in Louisiana to Newark Airport in Newark, New Jersey, crashes into the north side of 40 Wall Street in New York City, striking the 58th floor. The crash creates a 20-by-10-foot (6.1-by-3-meter) hole in the masonry and kills all five people aboard the plane, one of them a Women's Army Corps officer. No one on the street below and none of the 2,000 people in the building are injured.
- May 21 – Orvis Nelson Air Transport incorporates as Transocean Air Lines.
- May 27 – In United States v. Causby, the United States Supreme Court rules that the common law doctrine that persons who own real property own it Cuius est solum, eius est usque ad coelum et ad inferos ("from the depths to the heavens") "has no place in the modern world" at least as far as air rights are concerned, but that it remains "fundamental to property rights in land" as a source of law, and therefore a landowner does own "at least as much of the space above the ground as he can occupy or use in connection with the land" and invasions of that airspace "are in the same category as invasions of the surface." The ruling entitles the plaintiff to collect damages from the United States Government under the takings clause of the Fifth Amendment of the United States Constitution for forcing him out of the business of raising chickens on his farm because of the negative effect on the chickens of U.S. military aircraft operating from a nearby airport, but it does not specifically define where private property rights end and public airspace begins over private property in the United States.
- May 31 - London Heathrow Airport officially opens.

=== June ===
- The United States possesses nine atomic bombs, two of them earmarked for use in tests.
- The United States estimates that the Soviet Air Force has 14,000 combat aircraft and that the Soviet Navy has 2,000 aircraft.
- With post-World War II demobilisation underway, 100,000 members of the British Women's Auxiliary Air Force have left the service.
- June 4 – SABENA inaugurates its first transatlantic route, using Douglas DC-4 airliners to fly between Belgium and New York City.
- June 8 – A celebration of the Allied victory in World War II is held in London. It includes a flypast of 300 British aircraft over the city that stretches for 60 miles (97 km), led by a Hawker Hurricane that had fought in the Battle of Britain in 1940.
- June 11 – Capitol Airways is founded.
- June 15 – The United States Navy's newly formed Navy Flight Exhibition Team, better known as the Blue Angels, gives its first public performance at Jacksonville-Craig Field at Jacksonville, Florida.
- June 21 – A U.S. Army Air Forces P-80 Shooting Star carries the first air mail flown by a turbojet-powered aircraft.
- June 22 – Venezuela creates the Venezuelan Air Force as an independent service equal with the Venezuelan Army and Venezuelan Navy.

=== July ===
- The Government of Iran establishes the Iran Civil Aviation Organization as Iran's civil aviation authority.
- July 1
  - As part of Operation Crossroads, the U.S. Army Air Forces 509th Bombardment Group B-29 Superfortress Dave's Dream drops an atomic bomb on Bikini Atoll in the central Pacific Ocean in nuclear test Able. The bomb detonates at an altitude of 520 feet (160 meters) but inflicts less damage than expected on target ships anchored around the atoll because it misses its aim point by 2,130 feet (650 meters).
  - The U.S. Navy establishes Experimental Squadron 3 (VX-3). Equipped with Piasecki HRP-1 Rescuer helicopters, it probably is the world's first official all-helicopter squadron.
  - With post-World War II demobilization well underway, the U.S. Navy's force of aircraft carriers has dropped to 23 of all types with more decommissionings planned, while its aircraft force has declined from 41,000 to 24,000 within the past year and continues to decline rapidly.
- July 4 – The aircraft carriers USS Antietam (CV-36) and USS Boxer (CV-21) are among ten U.S. Navy ships participating in the celebration at Manila of the independence of the Republic of the Philippines.
- July 11 – A fire begins in the baggage compartment of the Transcontinental and Western Airways Lockheed L-049 Constellation Star of Lisbon during a training flight with no passengers on board designated Flight 513. The fire spreads and the plane crashes near Reading, Pennsylvania, killing five of the six people on board. As a result of the accident, all Constellations are grounded from July 12 to August 23 for the installation of cargo fire detection equipment.
- July 21 – A McDonnell XFD-1 Phantom executes the first intentional and controlled landing by a purely jet-powered aircraft aboard a U.S. Navy aircraft carrier, USS Franklin D. Roosevelt (CVB-42).
- July 26
  - The U.S. Joint Chiefs of Staff report that the Soviet Union has 4,000 combat aircraft based in Germany at a high state of readiness and able to strike virtually without warning.
  - Trans-Pacific Airlines (the future Aloha Airlines) begins non-scheduled interisland service in Hawaii.
- July 31 – Philippine Airlines becomes the first Asian airline to cross the Pacific using a chartered Douglas DC-4 on the first of several flights to ferry home 40 US servicemen. Each crossing took 41 hours with fuelling stops at Guam, Wake, Kwajelein and Honolulu.

=== August ===
- The United Kingdom loans the aircraft carrier HMS Colossus to France, which commissions her as Arromanches. Arromanches becomes the French Navy's first non-experimental fleet aircraft carrier. France will purchase the ship outright in 1951.
- The first peacetime deployment of American naval air power in the Mediterranean Sea in history begins with the arrival there of the aircraft carrier USS Franklin D. Roosevelt (CV-42).
- August 1 – The United Kingdom establishes British European Airways as a state-owned corporation.
- August 5 – The U.S. Joint Warfare Planning Committee predicts that after 1950 the Soviet Union will be able to strike the United States with guided missiles and strategic bombers armed with atomic weapons, seize territory in Alaska and Canada from which to launch air attacks against the United States, and employ airborne forces to attack vital targets. It recommends that the United States develop air warning, air defense, and antiaircraft artillery systems with which to counter such operations.
- August 6 – Two United States Army Air Forces B-17 Flying Fortresses make a 2,174-mile (3,499 km) flight from Hickam Air Force Base, Hawaii, to Muroc, California, under radio control.
- August 9 – As three U.S. Army Air Forces A-26 Invader attack aircraft make a low-level pass during an air show at the North Montana State Fair in Great Falls, Montana, two of them collide 750 feet (230 meters) from a grandstand crowded with 20,000 spectators. The wing of one A-26 shears off the tail of the other. The tail-less A-26 crashes into a horse barn, killing three crew members, three people on the ground, and twenty thoroughbred horses; the other A-26 continues to fly for between one and five miles (1.6 and 8 kilometers) (sources differ) before crashing in a field, killing one of its crewmen. The third bomber in the formation lands safely.
- August 15 – The U.S. Joint Warfare Planning Committee submits Plan Gridle for the defense of Turkey against the Soviet Union, which finds that the Turkish Air Force of fewer than 700 aircraft could offer only token resistance against a Soviet offensive and would have to be reinforced by ten American fighter groups, followed by the establishment of U.S. Army Air Forces heavy bomber bases in Turkey.
- August 23 – The U.S. Joint Intelligence Staff assesses that by 1948 the Soviet Union will be able to deploy 2,000 bombers against sea lines of communication in the Mediterranean Sea.
- August 30 – Bell's chief test pilot, Jack Woolams, dies in a plane crash while flying the P-39 Airacobra Cobra I over Lake Ontario while preparing for an air race the following day.

=== September ===
- Frank N. Piasecki's P.V. Engineering Forum is renamed Piasecki Helicopter Corporation.
- Operation Magic Carpet, which returns millions of American military personnel to the United States after World War II, concludes. Sixty-three U.S. aircraft carriers have taken part as temporary personnel transports.
- September 1 – Using Douglas DC-4 aircraft, Northwest Airlines initiates service between Seattle, Washington, and Anchorage, Alaska, as the first leg of its proposed United States-Japan North Pacific route.
- September 7 – A Royal Air Force Gloster Meteor flown by Group Captain E. M. Donaldson establishes a new world absolute air speed record of 615.65 mph (990.79 km/h) off the coast of West Sussex, England. The same day, a U.S. Army Air Forces Republic P-84 Thunderjet narrowly misses the world record, setting a United States speed record of 611 mph (983 km/h).
- September 9 – Trans Australia Airlines begins flight operations with a domestic flight in Australia from Laverton, Victoria, to Sydney. The flight carries a number of VIPs and only one paying passenger.
- September 16
  - The Italian airline Alitalia is formed.
  - Seaboard & Western Airlines is founded, operating a fleet of Douglas DC-4 aircraft. It will change its name to Seaboard World Airlines in April 1961.
- September 17 – A Sabena Douglas C-47 Skytrain (registration OO-AUR) crashes on takeoff from Haren Airport in Brussels, Belgium, killing one crew member. The other two crew members and four passengers on board survive.
- September 18 – A Sabena Douglas DC-4 (registration OO-CBG) crashes 35 km (22 mi) short of the runway while on final approach to Gander Airport in the Dominion of Newfoundland, killing 27 of the 44 people on board. A United States Coast Guard team from Coast Guard Air Station Elizabeth City in Elizabeth City, North Carolina, led by Commander Frank A. Erickson disassembles two helicopters, ships them to Newfoundland in fixed-wing aircraft, reassembles them, and uses them to rescue the 17 survivors.
- September 19 – The Portuguese airline Transportes Aéreos Portugueses, the future TAP Portugal, begins flight operations.
- September 24 – Cathay Pacific Airways is founded in Hong Kong by American Roy Farrell and Australian Sydney de Kantzow.
- September 27 – Geoffrey de Havilland Jr. is killed when the de Havilland DH 108 breaks up in mid-air over the Thames Estuary.
- September 29 – The United States Navy Lockheed P2V Neptune Truculent Turtle, piloted by Commander Thomas D. Davies and aided by four JATO rockets, departs Perth, Australia, bound nonstop for Naval Air Station Anacostia in Washington, D.C. On take-off, it weighs 85,575 pounds (38,816 kg), the heaviest twin-engine aircraft ever to take off up to this time. Although bad weather forces the plane to land short of Washington in Columbus, Ohio, after 55 hours 17 minutes continuously in the air, the flight nonetheless sets a new nonstop, unrefueled world distance record of 11,235.6 nautical miles (20,808.3 kilometres) which stands for 16 years until broken by a U.S. Air Force B-52H Stratofortress in 1962.
- September 30 – Mackey Air Transport (the future Mackey Airlines) is incorporated in Florida. It will make its first flight in January 1953.

=== October ===
- Under pressure from Pan American Airways, the Government of Mexico suspends the operating permit for the airline Aerovias Braniff, which has operated only since March 1945. With the U.S. Civil Aeronautics Board denying Braniff Airways' request to merge with Aerovias Braniff, the brief history of Aerovias Braniff comes to an end.
- October 3 – Carrying mostly wives and children of United States Army personnel serving in Germany, the American Overseas Airlines Douglas DC-4 Flagship New England crashes into a mountainside shortly after taking off from Stephenville in the Dominion of Newfoundland bound for Shannon Airport in Ireland, killing all 39 people on board. It is the worst U.S. civil airline accident in history at the time.
- October 4–6 – Piloted by Colonel Clarence Irvine, the United States Army Air Forces B-29B Superfortress Pacusan Dreamboat makes a non-stop flight from Hickam Air Force Base, Hawaii, to Cairo, Egypt, via the polar route, passing over the Territory of Alaska, the North Pole, Iceland, London, Paris and Foggia, Italy. The flight covers 9,444 miles (15,199 km) and lasts 39 hours 36 minutes.
- October 15 – Hermann Göring commits suicide by poisoning himself in his jail cell at Nuremberg, Germany, the day before his scheduled hanging for war crimes. A World War I ace with 22 victories and one of the leaders of the German Nazi movement and government, he had served as Supreme Commander of the German Luftwaffe from 1935 to 1945.
- October 23 – Orient Airways, the first and only Muslim-owned airline in the British Raj, is founded. It will begin operations in June 1947.
- October 29 – California Polytechnic State University football team plane crash: A Curtiss C-46 carrying the Cal Poly Mustangs football team crashes during takeoff from Toledo Express Airport in Ohio, resulting in 22 deaths.

=== November ===
- November 6 – An American intelligence report predicts that by 1956 the Soviet Union will have a strategic air force and as many as 150 atomic bombs, while the United States will have 350 to 400 atomic bombs. It assesses that the Soviet Union would withhold its atomic weapons during a war in order to deter an American nuclear attack on Soviet targets.
- November 10 – A U.S. Army Air Forces C-53 Skytrooper crashes on Switzerland's Gauli Glacier, posing a challenge for an assemblage of rescuers from the United States and the United Kingdom and Swiss aviators in spotting the downed plane. They rescue all twelve people (four crew members and eight passengers), partly through the Swiss use of a pair of Fieseler Fi 156 Storch ski-equipped short-takeoff-or-landing (STOL)-capable aircraft.
- November 23 – An Avro Lancastrian powered by two Rolls-Royce Merlin piston engines and two Rolls-Royce Nene turbojets turns off its Merlins and, operating using only the Nenes, becomes the first commercial aircraft to fly solely on jet power, making the trip from London to Paris in just 41 minutes.
- November 27 – Monarch Airlines begins scheduled air service with a flight from Durango, Colorado, using a Douglas DC-3.

=== December ===
- The Soviet Air Force's first jet fighter, the Mikoyan-Gurevich MiG-9 (NATO reporting name "Fargo"), becomes operational.
- December 2 – Southwest Airways begins scheduled flights, using Douglas C-47 Skytrains converted for civil use. It will rename itself Pacific Air Lines in March 1958.
- December 20 – The U.S. Joint Warfare Planning Committee reports that air forces in Italy consist of 112 British Royal Air Force fighters and 198 obsolete operational aircraft of the ill-trained Italian Air Force, which has low morale, and that in an invasion of Italy by the Soviet Union and its allies these forces would face 642 Yugoslav Air Force combat aircraft.
- December 24 – Western Air Lines Flight 44, a Douglas DC-3A (registration NC45395) crashes into the east slope of Cayupaipe Mountain in the Laguna Mountains while descending to a landing at Lindbergh Field in San Diego, California, towards the end of a flight from Holtville Airport, in Holtville, California, killing all 12 people on board.
- December 25 – Three passenger planes, all flying in from Chongqing, China, crash due to fog in separate incidents in Shanghai, China, killing at least 62 of the combined 68 passengers and nine crew members aboard. Two of the planes belong to China National Aviation Corporation and one to Central Air Transport. The incident became known as the Black Christmas disaster.
- December 30 – A United States Navy PBM Mariner supporting Operation Highjump crashes at Thurston Island, Antarctica, during a blizzard, killing three of the nine people on board. The six survivors are rescued 13 days later by aircraft from the U.S. Navy seaplane tender USS Pine Island (AV-12).
- December 31
  - The Portuguese airline Transportes Aéreos Portugueses (TAP) – the future TAP Portugal – begins its 12-stop Linha Aérea Imperial ("Imperial Air Line") service to Portuguese colonies, including stops at Luanda, Portuguese Angola, and Lourenço Marques, Portuguese East Africa.
  - The U.S. Navy's inventory of combat aircraft stands at 1,461, a 64 percent decline from the force it had available at the end of World War II on 15 August 1945. It has 10,000 naval aviators.

== First flights ==
- OKB-1 EF 131 (or Junkers EF 131)

=== January ===
- January 19 – Bell X-1 (unpowered)

=== February ===
- February 4 – Republic XF-12 Rainbow
- February 17 – Morane-Saulnier MS.660
- February 28 – Republic XP-84 45-54975, prototype of the F-84 Thunderjet

=== March ===
- March 10 – Avro Tudor 2 G-AGSU
- March 31 – Percival Prentice

=== April ===
- April 4 – Starck AS.57
- April 17 – Avro Tudor 7
- April 24
  - Mikoyan-Gurevich I-300, the Soviet Union's first jet
  - Yakovlev Yak-15 (three hours after the I-300)

=== May ===
- May 7 – Handley Page Hastings
- May 10 – SECAN Courlis
- May 17 – Douglas XB-43, first U.S. jet bomber 44-61508
- May 19 – Miles M.60 Marathon
- May 21 – Junkers EF 126 (unpowered)
- May 22 – de Havilland Canada DHC-1 Chipmunk

=== June ===
- June 6 – SNCAC NC.3021 Belphégor
- June 7 – Short Sturgeon prototype RK787
- June 14 – Fairchild F-11 Husky
- June 25 – Northrop XB-35 42-13603, prototype of the Northrop YB-35 flying-wing bomber

=== July ===
- July 7 – Hughes XF-11
- July 8 – Convair Model 110
- July 10 – Douglas DC-6
- July 27 – Supermarine Attacker prototype TS409

=== August ===
- August 8 – Convair XB-36 42-13570, prototype of the Convair B-36 Peacemaker
- August 16 – Northrop XP-89, prototype of the F-89 Scorpion

=== September ===
- September 11
  - Lavochkin La-150
  - North American XFJ-1, prototype of the FJ-1 Fury, the first jet aircraft to enter service with the United States Navy
- September 20 - Martin XP4M-1, prototype of the Martin P4M Mercator

=== October ===
- October 2 – Vought XF6U-1, prototype of the F6U Pirate
- October 7 – Fairchild XNQ
- October 13 – Boisavia Muscadet

=== November ===
- Ryan XF2R-1 Dark Shark
- November 9 – Lockheed R6O Constitution, later R6V Constitution
- November 11
  - Avions Fairey Belfair OO-TIA
  - SNCASO SO-6000 Triton, France's first jet
- November 13 – Sukhoi Su-9
- November 16 – Saab 90 Scandia prototype SE-BCA
- November 22 – Martin 2-0-2
- November 27 – North American XFJ-1, prototype of the FJ Fury, by George Welch

=== December ===
- December 2 – Beechcraft T-34 Mentor
- December 9 – Bell X-1 (first powered flight)
- December 12 – Westland Wyvern TS371
- December 21 – Northrop N-23 Pioneer

== Entered service ==
- Aeronca 11 Chief
- Fairchild F-11 Husky

=== September ===
- September 1 - Vickers VC.1 Viking with British European Airways (G-AHOP)
- September 30 - Short S.26 with BOAC Golden Hind (G-AFCI)

=== November ===
- November 24 - Douglas DC-6 with American Airlines and United Airlines

== Retirements ==
- Vought OS2U Kingfisher by the United States Navy.
