= VP-HL-1 =

Heavy Patrol Squadron (Landplane) 1
- Active: 1 December 1943 – 22 May 1947
- Country: United States of America
- Branch: United States Navy
- Type: squadron
- Role: Maritime patrol
- Nickname(s): Blue Raiders
- Engagements: World War II

Aircraft flown
- Patrol: PB4Y-1; PB4Y-2

VP-HL-1 was a Heavy Patrol Squadron (Landplane) of the U.S. Navy. The squadron was established as Bombing Squadron 116 (VB-116) on 1 December 1943, redesignated Patrol Bombing Squadron 116 (VPB-116) on 1 October 1944, redesignated Patrol Squadron 116 (VP-116) on 15 May 1946, redesignated Heavy Patrol Squadron (Landplane) 1 (VP-HL-1) on 15 November 1946 and disestablished on 22 May 1947.

== Operational history ==
- 1 December 1943 – May 1944: VB-116 was established at NAAS Camp Kearney, California, under the operational control of FAW-14. No aircraft were assigned to the squadron until March 1944, when the first PB4Y-1 Liberator was received. Training consisted of ground school and flight training at Camp Kearney and advanced base operations training at Holtville Airport, California. All training was completed by mid-May and preparations were begun for the trans-Pacific flight from NAS San Diego, California to NAS Kaneohe Bay, Hawaii. The 116th started with 16 aircraft and 18 crews under the command of Lieutenant Commander (LCDR) Donald Gumz.
- 24 May – June 1944: The squadron's advance echelon departed aboard USS Breton Woods for Naval Base Pearl Harbor, Hawaii. The squadron aircrews departed in three-aircraft elements beginning on 2 June 1944. One flight crew and its aircraft (Lieutenant (LT) Duggan's) were lost as part of these departures to Hawaii due to an apparent mechanical failure. Upon arrival at NAS Kaneohe Bay the squadron began the combat training syllabus for crews destined for the South Pacific combat zone. Training consisted of navigation, gunnery, bombing and aircraft recognition. Operational patrols of the approaches to Hawaii were conducted during the training phase.
- 7 July – 24 August 1944: VB-116 was deployed to Eniwetok, commencing operational patrols and sector searches by the 12th. Truk and Ponape were the frequent targets of the squadron's missions. Occasional escorts were provided for VD-4 during low level photographic reconnaissance flights over Truk. During the first two weeks of August, VB-116 flew several missions with VB-109 against enemy positions on Truk, Wake Island and Ponape. From 17 to 24 August 1944, the squadron flew special search patrols with VB-102 operating from Isley and East Fields, Saipan. On 9 August 1944 the 116th lost a crew (LT Anderson's) and aircraft in a takeoff accident at Eniwetok. Remaining inbound aircraft were diverted to nearby Engebi due to the inability to land on the damaged airstrip on Eniwetok.
- 16 August 1944: LT Kirchberg and LTJG Rohe's crew attacked and severely damaged the Japanese occupied Maug Island weather station and radio tower.
- 27 August 1944: VB-116 was relocated to North Field, Tinian, coming under the operational control of FAW-1. The squadron conducted long-range sector searches and made frequent attacks on enemy shipping. During the Battle of Peleliu the squadron provided coverage for the task force.
- 1 September 1944: The 116th adopted the name "Blue Raiders" when the Japanese propaganda commentator Tokyo Rose described LT Gammell's plane and crew, which sunk two ships and set three others on fire off Iwo Jima, as a "blue monster of the air, a fire-spitting blue raider".
- 12 October 1944: Lieutenant (LT) William M. Miller and his crew, in company with another VPB-116 aircraft flown by LT William B. Oliver, searched the waters off Iwo Jima for survivors of a squadron plane (LT Stimpson's) believed lost in that area. When enemy fighters rose to intercept the pair they continued their sweep and withdrew in company together. In the ensuing air-to-air combat the two bombers downed six of the eight attacking fighters. Miller and Oliver were subsequently awarded the Navy Cross for their actions. LT Stimpson's crew and aircraft were lost and not recovered.
- 1 November 1944: LT Thompson and crew downed a Kawanishi H8K "Emily".
- 24 January 1945: LT Kirchberg and LTJG Rohe's crew battered shore batteries and downed a Mitsubishi A6M Zero during a special mission to Iwo Jima.
- 11 February 1945: LT Kirchberg and LTJG Rohe's crew flew noted combat photographer/war correspondent Leif Erickson on a photo mission to Chuuk Lagoon (a.k.a. Truk). The 116th served in fleet support missions for Task Force 58 for the balance of February.
- 4 March 1945: VPB-116 began staging missions through Iwo Jima on its patrols. The outbound patrol leg consisted of 1,200 miles (1,900 km) via Iwo Jima and the leg of the patrol to Tinian was 1,000 miles (1,600 km). On 1 April a detachment of three aircraft was deployed to the forward base at Iwo Jima.
- 5 April 1945: VPB-116 was relocated to Peleliu Airfield to fly three daytime search sectors and one night Anti-submarine warfare (ASW) patrol. The squadron returned to its previous sites at Tinian and Iwo Jima on 30 April. The Iwo Jima detachment was enlarged when the tempo of operations and available targets shifted closer to the Japanese home islands. On 1 May 1945, operational control of the squadron was shifted to FAW-18. Missions from May to the end of the war entailed sector searches, ASW patrols and weather flights for the fleet. The squadron ceased combat operations in September and assumed the primary mission of weather flights until rotated back to the U.S. in October 1945.
- 27 August 1945: In a little-known twist of history, VPB-116 stole the limelight from General Douglas MacArthur and his staff. It has been widely recorded in the history books that Colonel Charles Tench, a member of MacArthur's staff, was the first American to set foot on Japanese soil at the Atsugi naval air base on 28 August. In fact, Lieutenant Commander Walter C. Michaels, commanding officer of VPB-116, landed at Atsugi in his PB4Y-2 Privateer on Monday, 27 August 1945. It was recorded in the war diary of the squadron that Michaels was experiencing "mechanical difficulties" which were repaired, and he returned to Iwo Jima the same day.
- 22 May 1947: VP-HL-1 was disestablished at NAS San Diego.

== Aircraft assignments ==
The squadron was assigned the following aircraft, effective on the dates shown:

- PB4Y-1 - March 1943.
- PB4Y-2 - 1945

== Home port assignments ==
The squadron was assigned to these home ports, effective on the dates shown:

- NAS Camp Kearney, California - 1 December 1943
- NAS Kaneohe Bay, Hawaii - 2 June 1944
- NAS San Diego, California - October 1945

== See also ==
- Maritime patrol aircraft
- List of inactive United States Navy aircraft squadrons
- List of United States Navy aircraft squadrons
- List of squadrons in the Dictionary of American Naval Aviation Squadrons
- History of the United States Navy
