= VPB-117 =

Patrol Bombing Squadron 117
- Active: 1 February 1944 – 15 November 1945
- Country: United States of America
- Branch: United States Navy
- Type: squadron
- Role: Maritime patrol
- Engagements: World War II

Aircraft flown
- Patrol: PB4Y-1; PB4Y-2

VPB-117 was a Patrol Bombing Squadron of the U.S. Navy. The squadron was established as Bombing Squadron 117 (VB-117) on 1 February 1944, redesignated Patrol Bombing Squadron 117 (VPB-117) on 1 October 1944 and disestablished on 15 November 1945.

== Operational history ==
- 1 February – July 1944: VB-117 was established at NAAS Camp Kearny, California, under the operational control of FAW-14, as a heavy bombing squadron flying the PB4Y-1 Liberator. These aircraft were equipped with the latest AN/APQ-5 low-altitude radar bombing gear. Ground school and flight training continued through the end of July 1944. In August the squadron began preparations for its trans-Pacific flight to NAS Kaneohe Bay, Hawaii. The training period was marred by the crash of Lieutenant (jg) Golden and crew at NAAS Camp Kearny on 6 June. The aircraft crashed into the supply hut of VB-102, resulting in the death of nine VB-117 personnel and nine VB-102 personnel and injuries to 11 others. The destruction of VB-102's supplies set back the squadron's planned trans-Pacific flight by one month.
- 11 August 1944: VB-117 flew the trans-Pacific flight to NAS Kaneohe Bay, with the last aircraft arriving on 13 August. Upon arrival the squadron came under the operational control of FAW-2. After a period of six weeks training in Anti-submarine warfare (ASW) techniques and operational searches, the squadron received orders for deployment to the combat zone in the South Pacific.
- September 1944: VB-117 transferred to North Field, Tinian, coming under the operational control of FAW-1. The squadron conducted operations from Tinian along with VBs 102, 116, 150 and 151. Operational patrol searches were flown southwest toward the Philippines, west toward the Ryukyu Islands and north along the Nanpō Islands, ranging out to 1,000 miles (1,600 km). Use of the night bombing low-altitude radar was discontinued due to the presence of friendly submarines in all search areas. Patrolling in the vicinity of Iwo Jima was done in two aircraft elements.
- 12 November 1944: The aircraft flown by Lieutenant Herbert G. Box and crew was severely damaged by anti-aircraft (AA) fire from Muko-jima Retto. Lieutenant Box's crippled aircraft made it to within 30 miles (48 km) of Tinian before being forced to ditch. Seven survivors were rescued the next morning. 2/C Aviation Ordananceman Basil Graves Martin of Washington County Indiana was one of the 3 men KIA/Buried at sea.
- 1 December 1944: VPB-117 was transferred to Tacloban Airfield, Leyte, Philippines, coming under the operational control of FAW-10. Unfortunately, most of the squadron's gear and personal effects were lost or damaged in the transfer from Tinian to Leyte. Search missions were conducted over Cebu, Los Negros Islands, French Indochina and Chinese ports. Considerable success was obtained during this one month. Claims were submitted for 22 enemy aircraft shot down and 14,750 tons of shipping sunk.
- 10 December 1944: Lieutenant Bradford M. Brooks and crew were attacked by four Mitsubishi A6M Zero fighters off Los Negros Island. During the ensuing engagement they shot down two Zeros but lost three of their engines and Brooks was forced to ditch. Although badly wounded, Brooks landed without flaps or right rudder control. Seven of the crew of 12 were able to exit the aircraft and were later returned by guerilla forces operating in the area. For his courage under fire and superb skill in landing his badly damaged aircraft, Lieutenant Brooks was awarded the Navy Cross.
- 31 December 1944: Lieutenant Harold Stang ran out of gas while on his final approach to the runway. The aircraft crashed into the bay 300-foot (91 m) from the strip and sank immediately. All of the crew except the copilot managed to exit the aircraft before it sank.
- 1–28 January 1945: During January search missions were deemed so crucial to fleet intelligence gathering that the squadron was not permitted to carry bombs in case any of its aircraft were lost in attacks on shipping or ground targets. On 28 January Lieutenant (jg) Robert E. White Jr. and crew were shot down while on a patrol to Formosa and the China Coast. The copilot and five crew members survived the crash and remained prisoners-of-war until after V-J Day.
- 29 January 1945: Lieutenant Commander Harold M. McGaughey, squadron executive officer, conducted a successful raid along the coast of the Japanese mainland sinking five merchant ships and damaging five others. McGaughey and his crew proceeded inland to strafe and destroy numerous shore installations and supply dumps in the face of intense AA fire. For his courage under fire and aggressive pursuit of the enemy, Lieutenant Commander McGaughey was awarded the Navy Cross.
- February 1945: The squadron was moved to McGuire Field, Mindoro, Philippines, under the operational control of FAW-17. From this location searches were conducted over the northwest coast of Borneo, the coastline of Indochina and the waters in between. The squadron was responsible for tracking enemy ships and task forces attempting to enter the search sectors. Close cooperation was maintained with the submarine forces during this period. Frequently, attacks by squadron aircraft would force enemy destroyers to break off depth charge attacks against U.S. submarines. On one occasion, an enemy battle group formed around the battleships Ise and Hyūga was tracked below the tip of Indochina and kept under surveillance both day and night until it reached a point north of Formosa. The enemy battle group had used a heavy weather front to cover its movements; however, this did not prevent the squadron from tracking the force using radar and the skill of its aircrews.
- 17 February 1945: Lieutenant Commander Harold W. McGaughey and crew were shot down over Puerto Princesa, Palawan Island, with the loss of all hands.
- 25 March 1945: Patrol restrictions the squadron had operated under were completely lifted during March and all patrols went forth fully armed. Shore installations, such as railroads, oil storage tanks, trains, vehicles and river shipping, were given special attention. Lieutenant Arthur J. Elder returned from one of these missions with his aircraft riddled, one crewman dead and five others injured. They had conducted an attack on shipping in Saigon Harbor, French Indochina, and sank three large merchant vessels. Two escort vessels and 20 small merchant vessels were also heavily strafed by intense AA fire thrown up by the escort vessels. Although Elder's aircraft was badly hit and several crewmen wounded, he managed to return to base, shooting down one enemy fighter on the way home. It was the third time this crew had returned with injuries, and it was decided to evacuate them back to the States. Lieutenant Elder was awarded the Navy Cross for his courage in pressing home the attack in the face of heavy enemy fire.
- June 1945: Credible targets in the squadron's search sectors had dwindled to nothing. The squadron received its first PB4Y-2 Privateer during this period and gladly exchanged the beat-up PB4Y-1 Liberators for the more heavily armed bomber.
- 14 June 1945: Lieutenant (jg) J. P. Dougan and his crew of 11 failed to return from a mission. All 11 men were listed as missing in action.
- 22 June 1945: Lieutenant (jg) S. W. Sayre crashed into the sea shortly after takeoff for a patrol. All 12 crew members perished.
- 1 July 1945: Lieutenant (jg) Robert E. Hepting and crew were shot down while on a patrol. Three members of the crew survived the crash and remained prisoners of war until V-J Day.
- 30 July 1945: Aircraft Machinist's Mate Second Class (AMM2C) Frederick F. Thomas became the squadron's last combat casualty when he was killed by AA fire during a mission over French Indochina.
- 11 August 1945: VPB-117 aircraft flew their last combat mission of the war. Operations were suspended at McGuire Field, Mindoro, Philippines. Preparations were begun to ferry the squadron aircraft and personnel back to Tinian.
- 16 August 1945: VPB-117 was transferred to Tinian to provide weather flights for the fleet under the operational control of FAW-18. On 19 September a detachment of five crews and four aircraft was sent to Pelelieu Airfield, Palau for special weather flights. During its combat tour from September 1944 to August 1945 the squadron was credited with completing 1,617 combat missions, 58 enemy aircraft claimed (55 verified by postwar review of enemy records), 236 enemy ships of all sizes claimed sunk or damaged, and destruction of innumerable ground targets. VPB-117 had five of the eight U.S. Navy multiengine bomber crews that shot down five or more enemy aircraft from in the air.
- September 1945: VPB-117 was relieved at Tinian and returned to the United States.
- October – November 1945: Squadron personnel were given orders for demobilization or extension of duty with other squadrons.
- 15 November 1945: VPB-117 was officially disestablished.

== Aircraft assignments ==
The squadron was assigned the following aircraft, effective on the dates shown:

- PB4Y-1 - March 1944
- PB4Y-2 - June 1945

== Home port assignments ==
The squadron was assigned to these home ports, effective on the dates shown:

- NAAS Camp Kearney, California - 1 February 1944
- NAS Kaneohe Bay, Hawaii - 11 August 1944
- NAS San Diego, California - September 1945

== See also ==
- Maritime patrol aircraft
- List of inactive United States Navy aircraft squadrons
- List of United States Navy aircraft squadrons
- List of squadrons in the Dictionary of American Naval Aviation Squadrons
- History of the United States Navy
