= Société Boisavia =

Société Boisavia was a French manufacturer of light aircraft established by Lucien Tieles. He began in 1946 with the B-50 Muscadet. The firm manufactured a number of types, most significantly the Mercurey in several variants, until the mid-1960s. Production of the Mercurey ended in 1962.

== List of aircraft ==
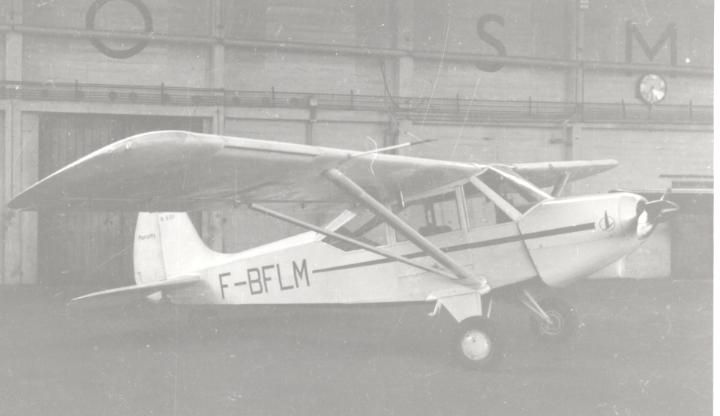
Boisavia B.601 Mercurey at Manchester in August 1953

- Boisavia B.50 Muscadet (1946)
- Boisavia B.60 Mercurey (1949) Single-engine four-seat high braced monoplane sport aircraft
- Boisavia B.80 Chablis (1950) Kit design for homebuilding. Two constructed
- Boisavia B.260 Anjou (1956)
