= Boisavia Muscadet =

B.50 Muscadet

General information
- Type: Cabin monoplane
- National origin: France
- Manufacturer: Boisavia
- Designer: Lucien Tieles
- Number built: 1

History
- First flight: 13 October 1946
- Variant: Boisavia Mercurey

The Boisavia B.50 Muscadet was a prototype French three-seat cabin monoplane first flown in 1946.

== Design and operations ==
The B.50 was designed and built after the Second World War by Luicien Tieles, it was a strut-braced high-wing monoplane with three seats and a conventional landing gear with a tail wheel. The prototype, with the French test registration F-WCZE, first flew on 13 October 1946 powered by a 100 hp (75 kW) Renault 4Pei engine. Tieles modified the design as a four-seater and formed Societe Boisavia to build the type which he called the Mercurey.

== Specifications ==
Data from Gaillard (1990) p. 40

General characteristics

- Crew: One pilot
- Capacity: One passenger
- Length: 7.15 m (23 ft 5 in)
- Wingspan: 10.50 m (34 ft 5 in)
- Height: 2.20 m (7 ft 3 in)
- Wing area: 15 m^{2} (160 sq ft)
- Airfoil: NACA 23.012
- Empty weight: 540 kg (1,190 lb)
- Powerplant: 1 × Renault 4Pei 4-cylinder inline air-cooled, 75 kW (100 hp)
- Propellers: 2-bladed

Performance

- Maximum speed: 180 km/h (110 mph, 97 kn)
- Cruise speed: 165 km/h (103 mph, 89 kn)
- Range: 850 km (530 mi, 460 nmi)
- Service ceiling: 4,500 m (14,800 ft)
