= Norman M. Miller =

United States Navy aviator (1908–1946)

Norman Mickey Miller
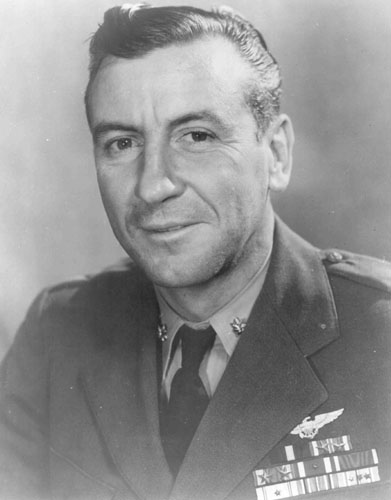
- CDR. Norman M. Miller
- Born: February 1, 1908; Winston-Salem, North Carolina, US
- Died: May 21, 1946 (aged 38); Corona, California, US
- Burial place: Arlington National Cemetery
- Military career
- Allegiance: United States
- Branch: United States Navy
- Service years: 1931–1946
- Rank: Captain (Posthumously)
- Nicknames: “Bus” ”Norm”
- Unit: Bombing Squadron 109
- Commands: Bombing Squadron 109
- Awards: Navy Cross; Silver Star; Distinguished Flying Cross (6); Purple Heart; Air Medal (6)

Norman Mickey "Bus" Miller (February 1, 1908 – May 21, 1946) was a United States Navy officer. He is one of the most decorated Naval Aviators during World War II.

He commanded Bombing Squadron 109, a Navy PB4Y-1 Liberator bombing squadron in the Pacific Theatre with the rank of Commander. Under his leadership, his squadron established the best record of destruction against enemy shipping and island bases of any land-based Navy search squadron in the Pacific.

== Biography ==
Miller was born in Winston-Salem, North Carolina on February 1, 1908. He attended Richard J. Reynolds High School and graduated on 1926. He entered the United States Naval Academy on June 20, 1927, and was commissioned an Ensign in the U.S. Navy on June 4, 1931, upon his graduation.

For his service in World War II, he received a letter of congratulation from Fleet Admiral Chester Nimitz, which says: "It is enough to say that the enemy will be glad you have left the forward area. Congratulations on an outstanding tour of combat duty. Well done.">

In September 1945, VPB-109 returned to NAS San Diego and was disestablished on 12 October 1945.

Miller remained in active duty, when the war ended on August 15, 1945, with the surrender of Japan. On 1946, he was admitted to Corona Naval Hospital in Corona, due to tuberculosis he contracted in the South Pacific.

Miller died on May 21, 1946, in the hospital. He was posthumously promoted to the rank of Captain and is buried at Arlington National Cemetery.

== Awards and decorations ==
Miller's decorations include:

Naval Aviator Badge

Navy Cross	Silver Star

Distinguished Flying Cross one 5/16" Silver Star	Purple Heart	Air Medal w/ one 5/16" Silver Star
Navy and Marine Corps Commendation Medal one "5/16" Gold Star	Navy Presidential Unit Citation	American Defense Service Medal w/ one 3/16" Bronze Star
Asiatic-Pacific Campaign Medal w/ one 3/16" Silver Star and two 3/16" Bronze Stars	American Campaign Medal	World War II Victory Medal

=== Navy Cross citation ===

Miller, Norman Mickey
Commander, U.S Navy
Patrol-Bombing Squadron 109 (VPB-109)
Date of Action: 16 May 1944

Citation:

The President of the United States of America takes pleasure in presenting the Navy Cross to Commander Norman Mickey Miller, United States Navy, for extraordinary heroism in operations against the enemy while serving as Commander of a Navy PB4Y Patrol Plane Commanding Officer of Patrol-Bombing Squadron ONE HUNDRED NINE (VPB-109), in action on 16 May 1944, at Truk Lagoon. During a long-range reconnaissance flight to Truk, Commander Miller spotted a 5,000-ton freighter anchored in the lagoon. He made a beam attack, releasing three bombs at masthead height, heavily damaging the vessel. He then spotted a 10,000-ton ship that immediately exploded after his bomb run, destroying a large portion of the vessel. He then proceeded on to Puluwat, arriving over the Japanese airfield at minimum altitude, surprised and strafed a formation of 30 enemy soldiers. In this attack he destroyed one truck, an aircraft revetment and dropped two bombs on a radio station. In his last bomb run on the radio station the Liberator was hit four times by AA fire, one exploding directly above the cockpit, wounding both Commander Miller and his second pilot. Despite his wounds and damage to the aircraft, Commander Miller flew the Liberator 800 miles back to base for a safe landing. His outstanding courage and determined skill were at all times inspiring and in keeping with the highest traditions of the United States Naval Service.

== Works ==
- Miller, Norman M.; Cave, Hugh B. (2001). I Took the Sky Road. Borgo Press. ISBN 978-1587154300.
