= Boisavia Chablis =

B-80 Chablis
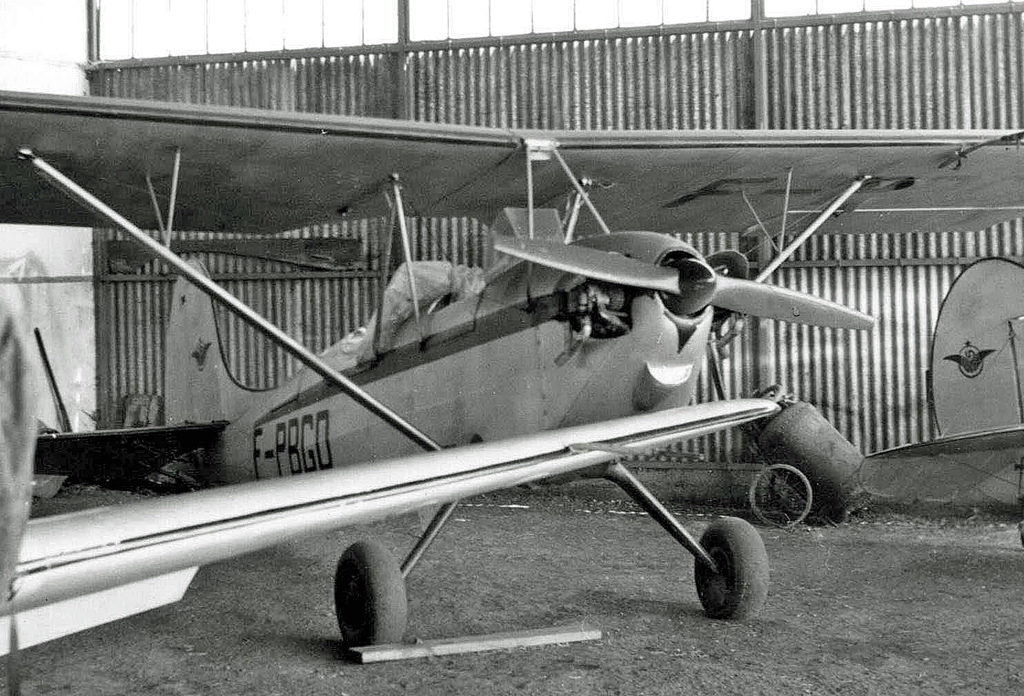
- The first Chablis F-PBGO at Persan-Beaumont airfield near Paris in June 1957

General information
- Type: Ultra-light monoplane
- National origin: France
- Manufacturer: Boisavia
- Designer: Lucien Tieles
- Number built: 2

History
- First flight: 16 July 1950

The Boisavia B-80 Chablis was French light sport aircraft of the 1950s.

== Design and development ==
The Chablis was designed by Lucien Tieles and constructed by Avions Boisavia in 1950. It was a two-seat ultra-light monoplane with a high parasol wing supported by struts. The seats were arranged in tandem fashion. It was of extremely simple all-wood design with fabric covering and was intended to be fitted with a variety of engines in the 50–80 h.p. range.

Two Chablis were built by Boisavia, the first F-PBGO making its first flight on 16 July 1950. These were powered by a 65 hp (48 kW) Continental A65 flat four-cylinder air-cooled engine. The Chablis was intended for construction by amateur builders using kits supplied by the firm. In the event, no further examples were completed and further development was not proceeded with.

== Specification ==
Data from

General characteristics

- Crew: 2
- Length: 7.0 m (22 ft 11 in)
- Wingspan: 9.0 m (29 ft 6 in)
- Gross weight: 513 kg (1,131 lb)
- Powerplant: 1 × Continental A65 flat four-cylinder air-cooled engine , 48 kW (65 hp)
