= Flak-Bait =

Twin-engined medium bomber in service during World War II

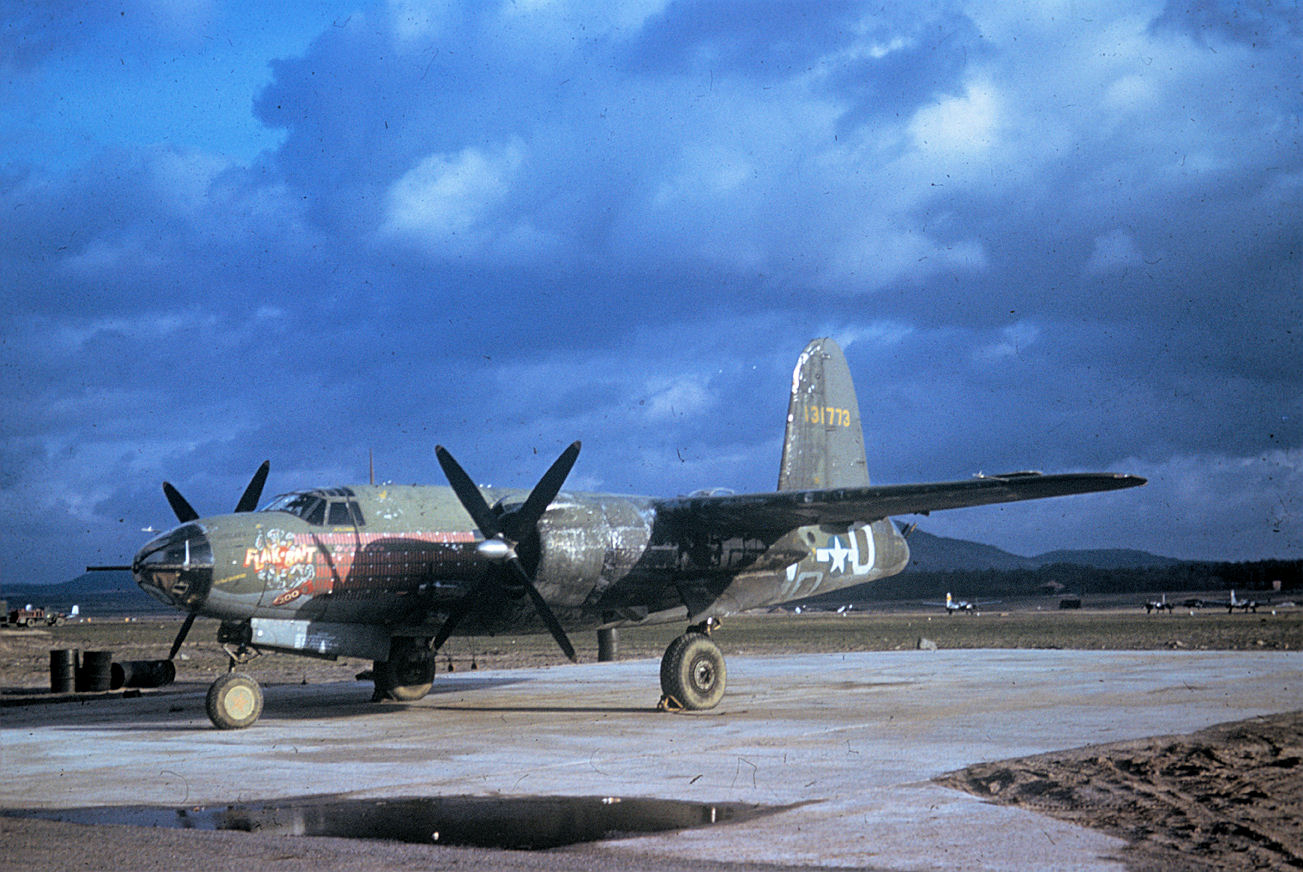
- Flak-Bait at Advanced Landing Ground A-89, Le Culot Airfield, Belgium, 1945

General information
- Type: Martin B-26 Marauder
- Manufacturer: Glenn L. Martin Company
- Owners: United States Army Air Force (USAAF)
- Serial: 41-31773
- Radio code: PN-O

History
- First flight: April 1943
- In service: April 1943 to December 1946
- Preserved at: Steven F. Udvar-Hazy Center, Chantilly, Virginia
- Fate: Museum display; currently undergoing restoration and conservation work

Flak-Bait is the Martin B-26 Marauder aircraft which holds the record within the United States Army Air Forces for the number of bombing missions survived during World War II. Manufactured in Baltimore, Maryland, as a B-26B-25-MA, by Martin, it was completed in April 1943, accepted by the United States Army Air Forces, and christened Flak-Bait by its first assigned pilot, James J. Farrell, who adapted the nickname of a family dog, "Flea Bait". Flak-Bait was assigned to the 449th Bombardment Squadron, 322d Bombardment Group stationed in eastern England.

During the course of its 202 (207 including its five decoy missions) bombing missions over Germany as well as the Netherlands, Belgium, and France, Flak-Bait lived up to its name by being shot with over 1,000 holes, returned twice on one engine (once with the disabled engine on fire), and lost its electrical system once and its hydraulic system twice. Despite the level of damage it received, none of Flak-Bait's crew was killed during the war and only one was injured. Over two years of operations, Flak-Bait accumulated 725 hours of combat time and participating in bombing missions in support of the Normandy Landings, the Battle of the Bulge, and Operation Crossbow against V-1 flying bomb sites.

A series of red-colored bombs is painted on the side of the aircraft, each representing an individual mission (202 bombs in total). White tails painted on the bombs represented every fifth mission. There is one black-colored bomb which represents a night mission. In addition to the bombs, there are also six red ducks painted on the aircraft representing decoy missions. There is also a detailed Nazi swastika painted above a bomb to represent Flak-Bait's only confirmed kill against a German aircraft.

On April 17, 1945, Flak-Bait flew its historic 200th mission, leading the entire 322nd Bombardment Group in a raid on Magdeburg, Germany. No other U.S. bomber flew so many missions over Europe during WWII. The record-setting Marauder added two more to its tally before hostilities ceased in that combat theater.

On March 18, 1946, Major John Egan and Captain Norman Schloesser flew Flak-Bait for the last time, to an air depot at Oberpfaffenhofen, Bavaria. There, the famed bomber was disassembled, crated, and shipped in December 1946 to a Douglas Aircraft factory in Park Ridge, Illinois.

== Preservation ==
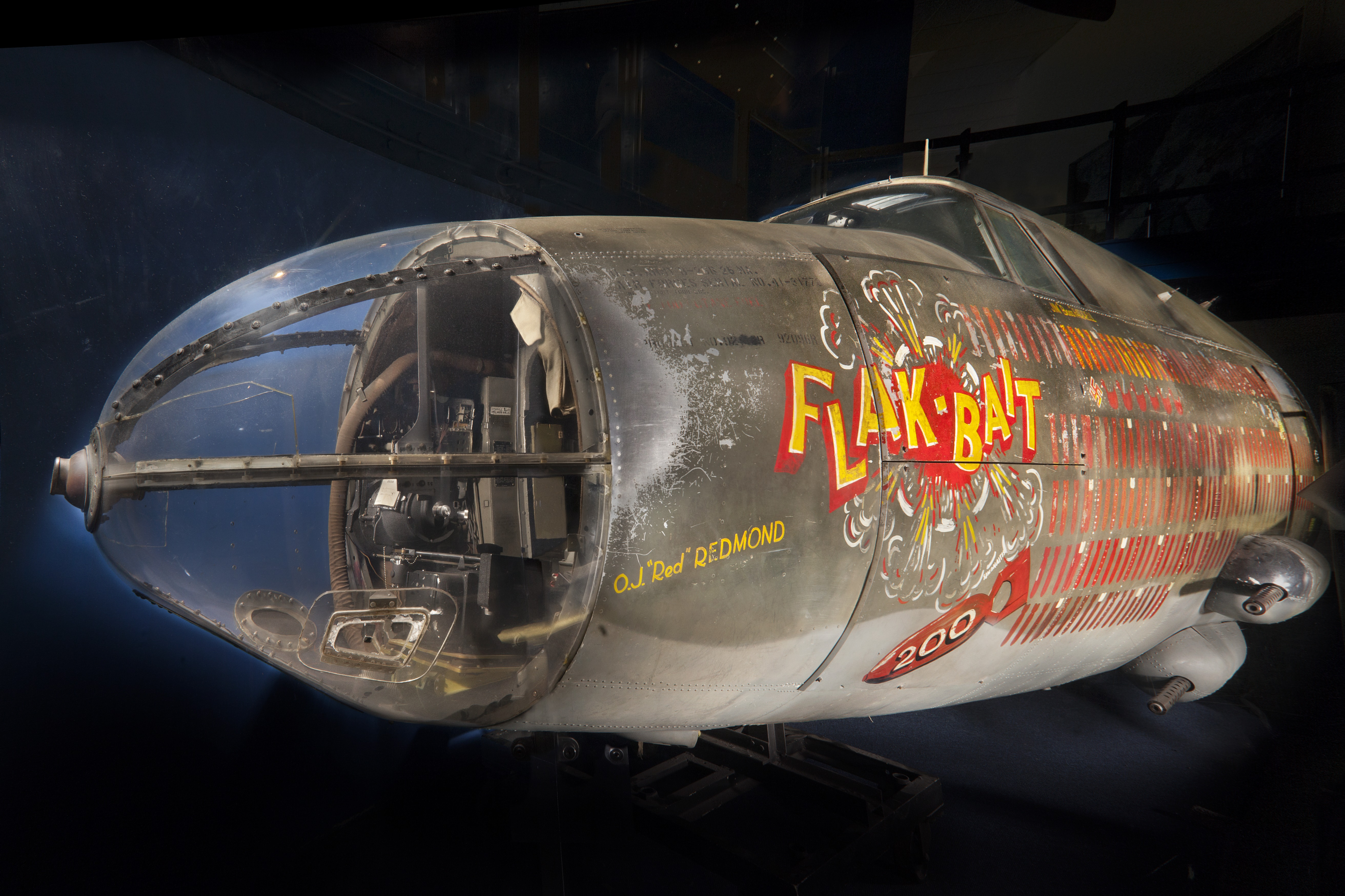
Martin B-26B 'Flak-Bait' fuselage at NASM (NASM2014-02561)

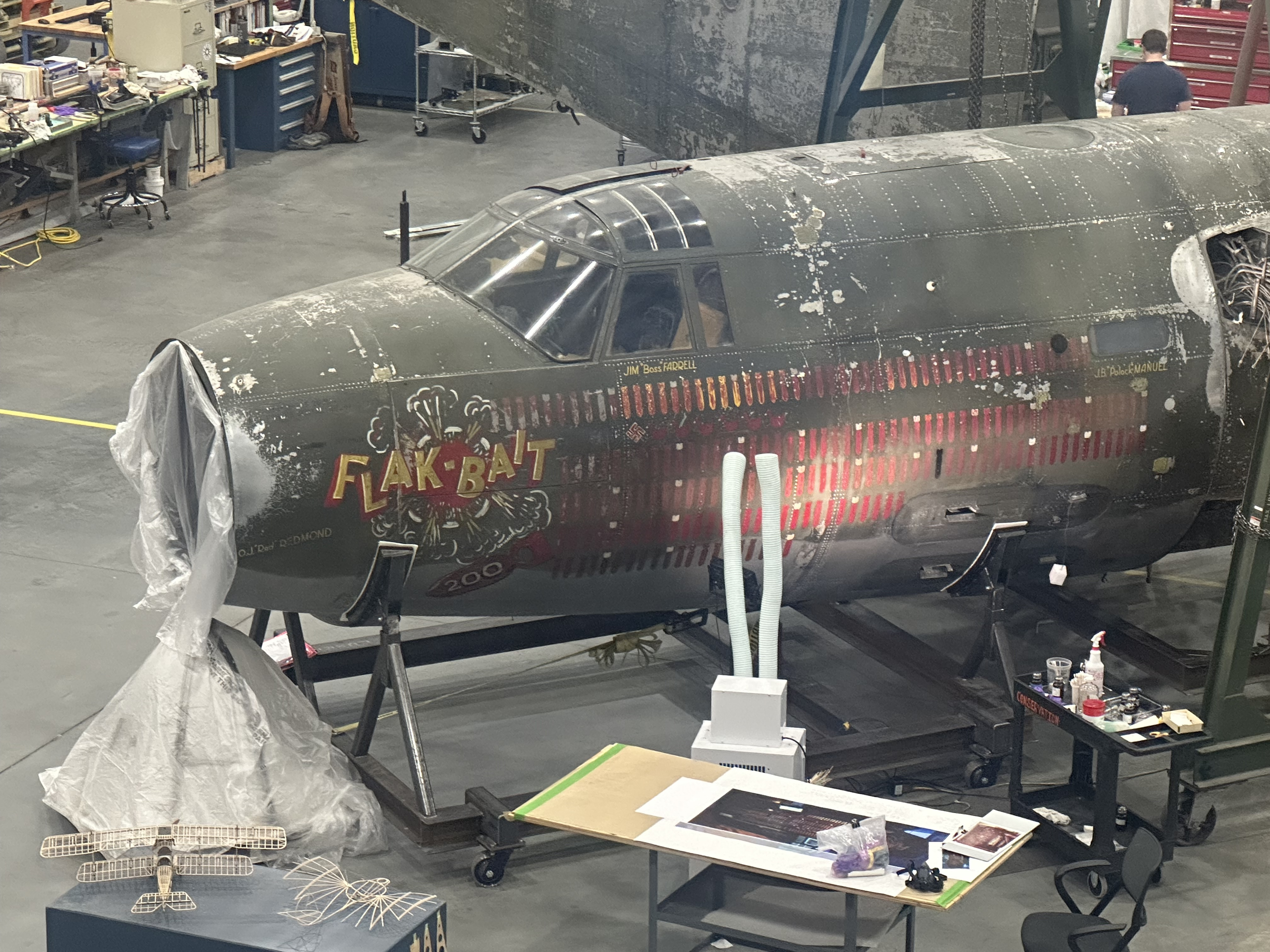
B-26 Flak-Bait under restoration in the Mary Baker Engen Restoration Hangar

When the National Air and Space Museum opened in Washington, D.C., in 1976, the nose section of Flak-Bait was placed on display there, with the remainder of the aircraft in storage at the Paul E. Garber Preservation, Restoration, and Storage Facility in Silver Hill, Maryland. In 2014, all parts of Flak-Bait were moved to the Mary Baker Engen Restoration Hangar at the Steven F. Udvar-Hazy Center in Chantilly, Virginia, for a comprehensive preservation and reassembly, which is ongoing as of early 2026.

== See also ==
- List of units using the B-26 Marauder during World War II
