= Boisavia Mercurey =

Series of four-seat light aircraft

B.60 Mercurey
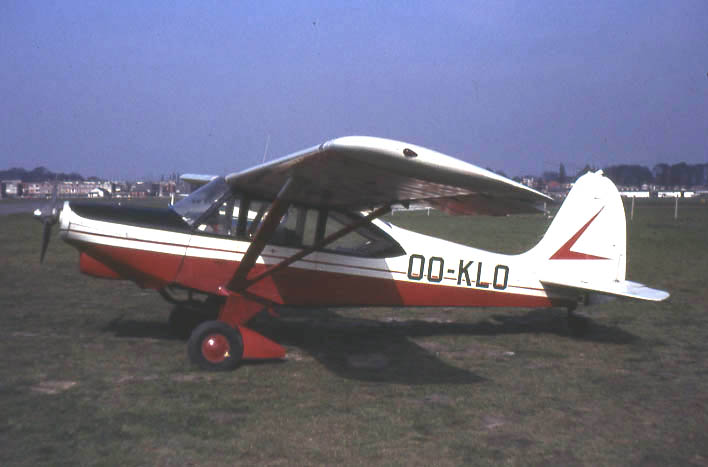

General information
- Type: Civil utility aircraft
- National origin: France
- Manufacturer: Boisavia
- Number built: 46

History
- First flight: 3 April 1949

The Boisavia B.60 Mercurey was a series of four-seat light aircraft developed in France shortly after World War II.

== Design and operations ==
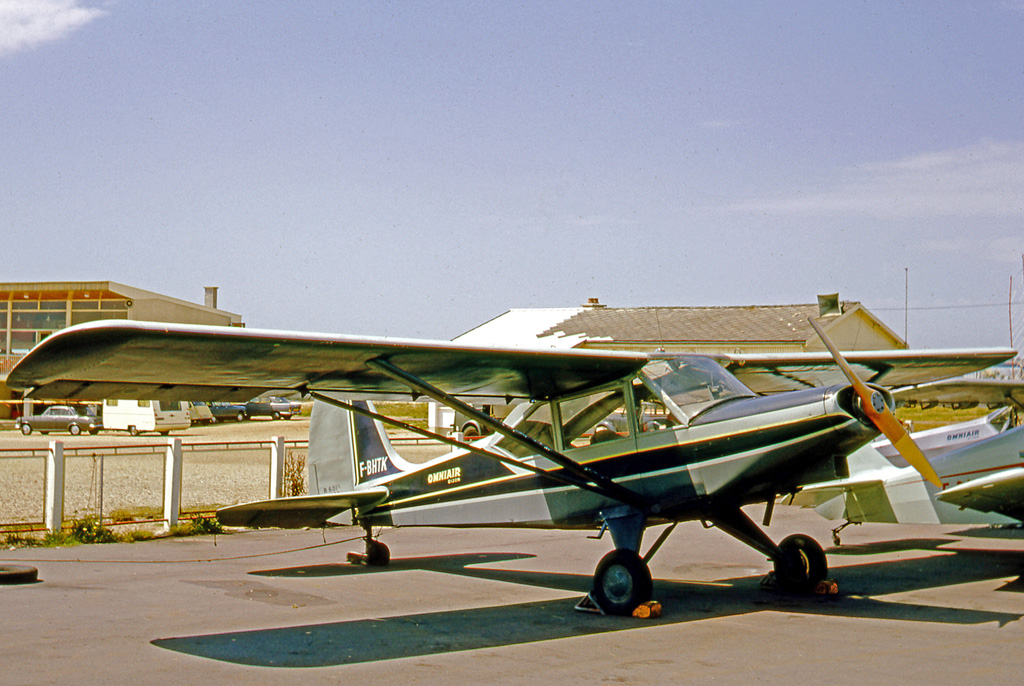
Boisavia B.601L Mercurey of Omniair at Dijon's Val Suzon airfield in 1965

The Mercurey was a conventional high-wing braced monoplane with fixed tailwheel undercarriage. It was built in small numbers and found use in the normal general aviation roles of tourer, trainer, agricultural aircraft, and glider tug.

== Variants ==
B.60 Mercurey
3 prototypes powered by 104 kW (140 hp) Renault 4Pei engine
B.601 Mercurey
Powered by a 142 kW (190 hp) Avco Lycoming O-435-1 engine;three built.
B.601L Mercurey
Main production version, equipped with an 130 kW (180 hp) Avco Lycoming O-360-A engine;twenty-seven built.
B.602 Mercurey
Powered by a 123 kW (165 hp) Continental E165-4 engine;two built.
B.602A
1x 159 kW (213 hp) Continental O-470-11
B.603 Mercurey Special
Glider tug version, powered by a 179 kW (240 hp) Salmson 8 As engine (Argus As 10);five built.
B.604 Mercurey II
Dedicated glider tug with lengthened fuselage, powered by a 172 kW (230 hp) Salmson 9ABc radial piston engine;one built).
B.605 Mercurey
Similar to the B.60, powered by a 127 kW (170 hp) Régnier 4LO2 (SNECMA 4L-02) engine;four built.
B.606 Mercurey
127 kW (170 hp) Régnier 4LO20 (SNECMA 4L-00) engine;one built.

== Specifications (B.60) ==
Data from Jane's All The World's Aircraft 1958–59

General characteristics

- Crew: 1
- Capacity: 3 passengers
- Length: 7.20 m (23 ft 7 in)
- Wingspan: 11.38 m (37 ft 4 in)
- Height: 2.20 m (7 ft 3 in)
- Wing area: 18 m^{2} (190 sq ft)
- Airfoil: NACA 23.012
- Empty weight: 710 kg (1,565 lb)
- Gross weight: 1,277 kg (2,815 lb)
- Fuel capacity: 220 L (58.1 US gal; 48.4 imp gal)
- Powerplant: 1 × Lycoming O-320 4-cylinder air-cooled horizontally-opposed piston engine, 100 kW (140 hp)

(or 170 hp (127 kW) Lycoming O-340)

- Propellers: 2-bladed Ratier fixed-pitch propeller

Performance

- Maximum speed: 235 km/h (146 mph, 127 kn)
- Cruise speed: 200 km/h (120 mph, 110 kn)
- Stall speed: 70 km/h (43 mph, 38 kn)
- Range: 1,200 km (750 mi, 650 nmi)
- Service ceiling: 5,500 m (18,000 ft)
- Rate of climb: 4 m/s (790 ft/min)
- Take-off run: 210 m (689 ft)
- Landing run: 150 m (492 ft)
