= VP-22 (1943–1994) =

Patrol Squadron 22
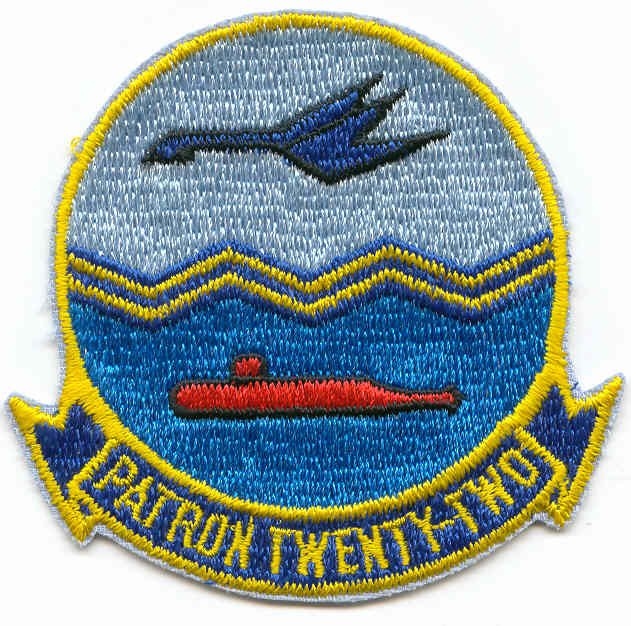
- VP-22 insignia
- Active: 15 February 1943-31 March 1994
- Country: United States of America
- Branch: United States Navy
- Type: squadron
- Role: Maritime patrol
- Nickname(s): Dragons; Blue Geese
- Engagements: World War II; Korean War; Vietnam War

Aircraft flown
- Patrol: PBY-5A/6A Catalina; PB4Y-1 Liberator; PB4Y-2 Privateer; P-2 Neptune; P-3 Orion

VP-22 was a long-lived Patrol Squadron of the U.S. Navy, nicknamed the Dragons from 1944 to 1950, and the Blue Geese from 1951 to 1994. It was established as Bombing Squadron VB-102 on 15 February 1943, redesignated Patrol Bombing Squadron VPB-102 on 1 October 1944, redesignated VP-102 on 15 May 1946, redesignated Heavy Patrol Squadron (Landplane) VP-HL-2 on 15 November 1946, redesignated VP-22 on 1 September 1948 and disestablished on 31 March 1994. It was the third squadron to be designated VP-22, the first VP-22 was disestablished, merged with VP-101 on 18 April 1942 and the second VP-22 was redesignated VPB-22 on 1 October 1944.

== Operational history ==
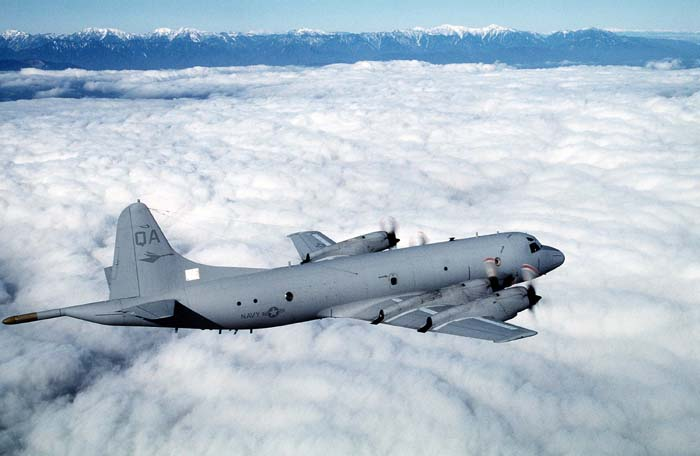
VP-22 P-3C in 1991

- 15 February 1943: VB-102 was established at NAS Kaneohe Bay, Hawaii, from half of the squadron assets and personnel of VP-14. It operated under the operational control of FAW-2 during its formation and training period. The squadron continued flying the PBY-5A Catalinas from VP-14 as additional crews and ground personnel were brought aboard. As the squadron was designated for conversion to the landplane PB4Y-1 Liberator, the crews began transition training as the new aircraft were received over the next two months. VB-101 was the first squadron to fly the new landbased bomber, and VB-102 was the second.
- 28 February 1943: Single aircraft detachments (PBY-5As) were sent to Canton, Midway and Johnston Islands to provide patrol sector coverage. By 1 March 1943, similar patrols were being conducted in the vicinity of the Hawaiian islands by the squadron at Kaneohe flying the newly assigned PB4Y-1 Liberators.
- 7 April 1943: The squadron suffered its first operational loss when Lieutenant (jg) Herbert S. Bonn flew into the water during a night takeoff.
- 22 April 1943: All of the Liberators received for squadron use were the early model Army versions (B-24D) without a powered nose turret. Reports from the combat zone showed that Liberator squadrons with 30-caliber nose guns were sustaining very high casualty rates. Newer models of the Liberator destined for Army use (B-24H with Emerson or Consolidated turrets) did not come off the assembly lines until June 1943. PB4Y-1 Liberators destined for Navy use did not get the refit at NAS San Diego with ERCO 250SH-1 powered turrets with twin 50-caliber gun mounts until after May 1943. VB-102 was scheduled to go into combat before any of the refitted models could be obtained. In a flash of inspiration, Commander Chick Hayward, who was in command of the newly established Patrol Service Wing at Kaneohe, decided that tail gun turrets (Consolidated versions) in the slow and unwieldy PB2Y-2 Coronado seaplanes then sitting on the ramp awaiting maintenance or cargo runs to the mainland—would be more useful in the noses of the PB4Y-1s which were going into combat. A few days later the commander of the PB2Y squadron walked down on the ramp to find all the tail turrets of his aircraft missing! They had been put in the noses of the VB-102 aircraft.
- 22 April 1943: VB-102 received its first combat assignment at Carney Airfield, Guadalcanal, under the operational control of FAW-1. A five-aircraft detachment was maintained at Espiritu Santo. Daily search sectors of 800 miles were conducted in conjunction with VB-101, which had arrived at Carney Field prior to VB-102. The squadron's primary mission was to protect the southern Solomons from invasion and to intercept enemy shipping. During one such mission a squadron Liberator was heavily damaged during an attack on the enemy seaplane base on Greenwich Island.
- 7 July 1943: The commanding officer of VB-102, Lieutenant Commander Bruce A. Van Voorhis, and his entire crew were killed during a daytime attack on enemy positions on the island of Kapingamarangi. Lieutenant Commander Van Voorhis received the Medal of Honor for this action and his co-pilot, Lieutenant (jg) Herschel A. Oehlert, Jr., was awarded the Navy Cross. All of the other crew members were awarded the Distinguished Flying Cross. Official accounts of the action describe it as a long-distance bombing mission (700 miles) against enemy positions on the Japanese-occupied Greenwich Islands chain. Van Voorhis made six bombing runs against a radio station and several strafing runs against three seaplanes and shipping in the lagoon. It was reported that on his last run his aircraft was “too low and too slow” and was caught in its own bomb blast. An enemy account found after the war, however, claimed that the bomber was shot down by one of the floatplanes. The bomber crashed in the lagoon with no survivors.
- 9 July 1943: Lieutenant Shiley and crew were shot down by Japanese night-fighters over Kahili Airfield on Bougainville. There were no known survivors.
- August 1943: Lieutenant (jg) Haskett and his crew were lost in a night bombing mission over Kahili. The squadron's losses in July and August 1943 occurred during bombing missions. However, the majority of work done by the squadron entailed search and reconnaissance, with bombing strictly secondary. Approximately 95 percent of the squadron's operations were single-plane search missions north of Guadalcanal and east of Bougainville.
- 1 November 1943: The squadron continued its operations from Carney Field at Guadalcanal, flying several missions with the 13th Army Air Force which also operated Liberators and B-25s out of Carney Field. VB-102 remained at Guadalcanal and Espiritu Santo until relieved on the first of November by VB-106. The aircraft were flown back to NAS Kaneohe for refit and reassignment while the crews and ground personnel departed for the States.
- 14 February 1944: VB-102 was reformed at NAAS Kearney Field, California, from a nucleus of veterans (14 of the original 18 PPCs) from the first combat tour. During the training period the squadron came under the operational control of FAW-14. The squadron received the newer version of the PB4Y-1 Liberator with ERCO nose turrets and retractable belly turret. The squadron remained at Kearney Field until June, when preparations were made for the flight to Kaneohe, Hawaii. These preparations suffered a one-month setback on 6 June when a PB4Y-1 from VB-117 flown by Lieutenant (jg) Golden crashed into the squadron supply office, killing the supply chief and his assistant, and destroying most of the stores intended for the deployment. The training accident resulted in the death of nine VB-117 personnel and nine VB-102 personnel, and injuries to 11 others.
- 9 July 1944: VB-102 flew to NAS Kaneohe without incident and commenced combat operational training on the 18th. Crew skills were honed in bombing, ASW, use of new night radar sets and gunnery.
- 12 August 1944: The squadron flew from Kaneohe to Eniwetok in five increments of three aircraft each, arriving at Stickell Field on the 14th. VB-102 relieved VB-109 and assumed duties as part of CTG 59.3 under FAW-1. Missions consisted of long-range reconnaissance.
- 27 August 1944: VB-102 was reassigned to North Field, Tinian, as part of the Search, Reconnaissance and Photographic Command of Task Force 57. On 10 September 1944 operational control of the command was transferred from FAW-2 to FAW-1. Long-range reconnaissance missions with 800-mile sectors continued to be the order of the day.
- 27 March 1945: One of the missions liked the least by all squadrons in the South Pacific was the destruction of enemy picket boats. These small, heavily armed and armored vessels were stationed several hundred miles from the Japanese coasts along routes flown by the bomber streams attacking Japanese cities. Their reports of approaching attack forces gave the Japanese Home Defense forces time to prepare for interceptions. Lieutenant Wayne D. Rorman and his crew attacked one of the picket boats on the 27th, making a low-level, high-speed approach. During such a run only one pass was usually made and all ordnance was dropped by eye, rather than with complicated bomb sights. Rorman's bombing and strafing run was successful and the picket boat was sunk but his aircraft was heavily damaged. With great skill and good luck, Rorman managed to bring the bomber back to Tinian. For his heroic action, Lieutenant Rorman was subsequently awarded the Navy Cross.
- 1 April 1945: Routine search and long-range reconnaissance missions continued from Tinian through the first of April 1945, when the squadron received orders to establish an eight-aircraft detachment at Iwo Jima. The detachment flew two daily 800-mile sector searches with two aircraft to the borders of the Japanese homeland across Nansei Shoto and south Kyushu. The squadron was placed under the operational control of FAW-18.
- 23 April 1945: VPB-102 was based temporarily on Peleliu, flying three daily 600-mile search sectors north of Peleliu. Night antishipping patrols were flown on a periodic basis. The squadron was joined on 24 April by VPB-152. Search sector patrols north of Palau and all night antishipping patrols were carried out through 2 May 1945, when the squadron was relocated to Tinian under the operational control of FAW-18.
- 3 May 1945: After settling in at Tinian, the squadron commenced 1,000-mile sector searches and reconnaissance of the Japanese-held Truk Island airstrips. Occasional attacks were made on Japanese-held Marcus Island. A detachment of four aircraft was sent to Central Field, Iwo Jima, for long range reconnaissance to Honshu and Kyushu through north Nansei Shoto. On 18 May an additional six aircraft were sent to supplement the detachment and begin night antishipping patrols. During the next two months, the aircraft remaining at Tinian with the headquarters staff, provided the fleet with weather reports. Both the Tinian and Iwo Jima detachments provided daytime air-sea rescue patrols for B-29 crews returning from nighttime bombing missions.
- 9 May 1945: On 9 May Lieutenant Elwood C. Mildahn led his aircraft in a low level attack on Marcus Island. He pressed home his attack in the face of intense antiaircraft fire and successfully struck his target resulting in large fires. He was awarded the Navy Cross for this action. Lieutenant Commander Louis P. Pressler, VPB-102's commanding officer, was also awarded the Navy Cross for his action during the strike on Marcus Island. Despite the intense antiaircraft fire he succeeded in destroying three enemy planes preparing for take off and damaged the airstrip with a string of accurately placed bombs along the length of the runway.
- 1 July 1945: VPB-102 received its first PB4Y-2 Privateer replacements for the slower, less heavily armed Liberators. From 22 February 1945 to 7 August 1945, squadron losses were six PB4Y-1 aircraft, 23 killed and 12 wounded.
- 2 September 1945: V-J Day, VPB-102 was still based at Iwo Jima operating with 11 PB4Y-2s and 18 crews.
- 19 September 1945: Three of the aircraft assigned to the Iwo Jima detachment were sent to NAS Agana, Guam, as an advance echelon. On 29 September the remainder of the squadron, including the headquarters detachment at Tinian, joined the advance echelon on Guam. Shortly after arrival, the squadron began crew rotations back to the States and received orders to reduce the squadron complement of aircraft from 15 to 12. Duties during this period consisted primarily of weather reconnaissance. On 6 December 1945, a detachment of four aircraft was sent to Peleliu to provide weather reconnaissance for the fleet.
- 29 December 1945: VPB-102 and the Peleliu detachment returned to Tinian, with a two-aircraft detachment remaining at Guam for weather reconnaissance. This detachment rejoined the squadron on 29 January 1946.
- 3 January 1946: The squadron received orders to reduce the squadron complement of aircraft and crews from 12 to 9. On 12 April 1946, two aircraft detachments were sent to Peleliu and Agana, Guam, for weather reconnaissance. A third weather reconnaissance detachment was sent to Iwo Jima on 24 April.
- 1 May 1946: The squadron headquarters staff was transferred back to Agana, Guam. The squadron remained there for the next several months, spraying DDT on Iwo Jima, Marcus Island, Yap, Ulithi, Pagan, Tinian and other outlying islands.
- 6 June 1946: NAS San Diego, Calif., was designated as the squadron's permanent state-side home port, with Agana, Guam, as its primary deployment site. The squadron was still based primarily on Guam throughout the year.
- 15 November 1946: VP-102 was redesignated VP-HL-2 with its primary mission remaining weather reconnaissance.
- 10 March 1947: The squadron participated for the first time in a week of ASW exercises off the coast of Guam. Lieutenant Degennaro had the distinction of hitting a submarine's periscope with a miniature bomb during the exercises, putting the vessel out of commission for the rest of the week.
- 31 December 1947: The primary mission of VP-HL-2 was changed from weather reconnaissance to ASW. The squadron continued to fly weather missions periodically over the next several years on an as needed basis.
- 2 July 1948: NAS Kaneohe Bay, Hawaii, was designated as the squadron's new permanent home port.
- 1 May 1949: The squadron's permanent home port was relocated from NAS Kaneohe, Hawaii, to NAS Barbers Point, Hawaii.
- 30 June 1950: VP-22 received its first P2V-4 Neptunes, at a cost of $693,000 per aircraft, as replacements for the Privateers.
- 1 November 1950: VP-22 deployed to WestPac during the Korean War, based at Naha AFB, Okinawa, with nine P2V-4 aircraft and 12 flight crews. Duties consisted of two armed reconnaissance patrols daily along the China coast and Formosa Strait.
- 21 January 1951, the squadron lost one aircraft due to starboard engine failure during takeoff. The P2V crashed and sank in 20 fathoms of water one mile off the end of the runway. There were 11 survivors and two crewmen were listed as missing (their bodies were later recovered).
- 1 December 1951: VP-22 was deployed to WestPac for a second Korean combat zone tour at NAS Atsugi, Japan. Patrol duties consisted of ASW and weather reconnaissance flights over the Sea of Japan and the Tsushima Strait.
- 29 November 1952: VP-22 began its third tour of operations in the Korean theater conducting shipping surveillance of the China Sea. The squadron carried out 486 combat patrols during deployment, losing one aircraft in combat and another in an accident.
- 18 January 1953: A P2V-4 of VP-22 patrolling the Formosa Strait was shot down off Swatow, China, by Communist Chinese antiaircraft fire and ditched in the Formosa Strait. Eleven of 13 crew members escaped the aircraft. Shore battery gunfire and high seas hampered rescue operations, the latter causing the Coast Guard PBM-5 rescue plane to crash on takeoff. Total losses from the incident were 11 men, 7 of them from the Neptune crew. USS Halsey Powell, while under fire from the shore batteries, rescued 10 survivors from the sea.
- 31 January 1953: One of the squadron's P2V-5s was listed as missing. Subsequent search revealed the wreckage with 11 victims on a mountainside at the northeast end of Okinawa.
- 1 February 1955: VP-22 received its first jet-assisted P2V-5F Neptune. The new aircraft had improved short field takeoff capability; the jet engines assisted in maintaining higher airspeed and altitude.
- 19 Nov 1958: The squadron deployed to Naval Air Facility Adak, Alaska. During deployment the size of the squadron was increased from 45 officers and 197 enlisted to 55 officers and 300 enlisted personnel.
- July 1960: Squadron aircraft were retrofitted for antisubmarine warfare with JULIE and JEZEBEL electronic equipment. JULIE was an electronic system for detection and tracking of submarines, while JEZEBEL acoustic signal processors were used to track submerged targets. The new equipment was thoroughly tested during a November 1960 to May 1961 deployment.
- 1 November 1964: VP-22 picked up its first P-3A Orion at the Lockheed plant in Burbank, Calif. Cost of the new aircraft was $3,950,000.
- 23 April 1965: The squadron deployed to Naval Station Sangley Point, Philippines, for duty with the 7th Fleet in Operation Market Time, coastal patrol operations off the coast of South Vietnam. A detachment operated from Cam Ranh Bay Air Base, Vietnam, with VP-42.
- 21 April 1966: VP-22 deployed a detachment to Midway and Kwajalein for advance base operations as part of Operation Elusive Elk. The operation involved test firings of intercontinental ballistic missiles (ICBM) with an impact zone in the vicinity of Midway and Kwajalein. All of the squadron crews were rotated for these exercises for two-week periods extending through 30 September 1966.
- 26 June 1968: The squadron commenced a sixmonth Progressive Aircraft Rework Cycle, equipping its P-3A aircraft with new communications gear, air-to-surface missiles and the AGM-12 Bullpup missile system. During the rework, the squadron deployed on 30 June 1968, to NAF Naha with a detachment supported at NAF Cam Ranh Bay.
- 15 November 1969: VP-22 deployed to NS Sangley Point with a detachment at U-Tapao Royal Thai Navy Airfield, Thailand.
- 14 January 1971: The squadron deployed to NAF Naha, Okinawa, with detachments at NAF Cam Ranh Bay, RVN, and RTNB U-Tapao, Thailand.
- 11 October 1971: VP-22 began the refit for the P-3B DIFAR system, which utilized the Navy's most sophisticated ASW sensor equipment. The refit continued through April 1972.
- 21 April 1972: VP-22 deployed to NAF Naha, Okinawa, with a detachment at Naval Air Station Subic Bay, Philippines. This deployment marked the squadron's last deployment to a combat zone during the Vietnam War.
- 29 August 1978: A detachment was sent to NAS Moffett Field, California, for transition to the P-3B MOD (TAC/NAV) aircraft, returning to NAS Barbers Point, Hawaii, on 31 December 1978. at that time to NAS Cubi Point, and was tasked with locating boatloads of refugees in the South China Sea and directing surface ships of the 7th Fleet to assist them. During the remainder of the deployment the squadron was engaged in SAR missions to rescue the Vietnamese boat people, who were still fleeing their homeland.
- 31 December 1982: VP-22 was designated as the test squadron for the operational deployment of the ALR-66 electronic warfare instrumentation package.
- July 1990: The squadron received its first P-3C UII.5 aircraft replacements for the P-3B MODs. Transition was completed in October, with all of the older P-3B models going to various reserve patrol squadrons.
- April 1992: The squadron received it first P-3C UIIIR aircraft. Transition training was undertaken at NAS Moffett Field, Calif., in increments of four crews.
- 24 February 1992: Four crews were detached for duty with the JCS sponsored Counter Narcotics Operations at Howard AFB, Panama. The detachment returned on 26 March 1992.
- 15 March 1994: VP-22 was disestablished at NAS Barbers Point, Hawaii.

== Home port assignments ==
The squadron was assigned to these home ports, effective on the dates shown:

- NAS Kaneohe, Hawaii 15 February 1943
- NAAS Kearney Field, California 14 February 1944
- NAS Kaneohe, Hawaii 9 July 1944
- NAS San Diego, California 6 June 1946
- NAS Kaneohe Bay, Hawaii 2 July 1948
- NAS Barbers Point, Hawaii 1 May 1949

== Aircraft assignment ==
The squadron first received the following aircraft on the dates shown:

- PBY-5A February 1943
- PB4Y-1 February 1943
- PB4Y-2 July 1945
- P2V-4 July 1950
- P2V-5 July 1952
- P2V-5F February 1955
- SP-2E November 1962
- P-3A November 1964
- P-3B DIFAR October 1971
- P-3B TAC/NAV MOD August 1978
- P-3C UII.5 September 1990
- P-3C UIIIR April 1992

== See also ==
- Maritime patrol aircraft
- List of inactive United States Navy aircraft squadrons
- List of United States Navy aircraft squadrons
- List of squadrons in the Dictionary of American Naval Aviation Squadrons
- History of the United States Navy
