= VPB-109 =

Patrol Bombing Squadron 109
- Active: 2 August 1943 – 12 October 1945
- Country: United States of America
- Branch: United States Navy
- Type: squadron
- Role: Maritime patrol
- Engagements: World War II

Aircraft flown
- Patrol: PB4Y-1 Liberator; PB4Y-2 Privateer

VPB-109 was a Patrol Bombing Squadron of the U.S. Navy. The squadron was established as Bombing Squadron 109 (VB-109) on 2 August 1943, redesignated as Patrol Bombing Squadron 109 (VPB-109) on 1 October 1944, and disestablished on 12 October 1945.

== Operational history ==
- 2 August – 30 October 1943: VB-109 was established at NAS San Diego, California, as a heavy bombing squadron flying the PB4Y-1 Liberator and under the operational control of FAW-14. Fifteen aircraft were assigned to the squadron with 18 flight crews. During this training period emphasis was upon familiarization with the Liberator, instruments, navigation, and night flying, with some gunnery and bombing. Training was completed on 30 October and preparations were begun for the trans-Pacific flight to NAS Kaneohe Bay, Hawaii.
- 4 November 1943: VB-109 completed the transpac to NAS Kaneohe Bay, coming under the operational control of FAW-2. The advanced combat phase of training was begun in conjunction with operational patrols over the approaches to the Hawaiian Islands.
- 28 December 1943 – 13 January 1944: The squadron was transferred to Apamama, Gilbert Islands, and conducted its first combat patrol on 31 December 1943. On 1 January 1944, Lieutenant John F. Bundy made the squadron's first kill, sinking a 2,000-ton cargo vessel near Mille. The squadron's arrival was greeted the next evening by an enemy air raid that destroyed one aircraft, damaged two others, and wounded three personnel. Throughout the month of January the squadron continued attacks on enemy shipping with good results; dropped mines at Maloelap Atoll, Wotje, and Kwajalein; and served as fighter escort for photographic planes from VD-3 on low-level missions. On 13 January 1944, Lieutenant Samuel E. Coleman and his crew failed to return from a patrol.
- 3–28 February 1944: Numerous photographic missions were flown over the islands of Eniwetok and Wotje, some in conjunction with VD-3. Bombing missions were conducted over Wotje, Kusaie, and Wake Island. On 13 February 1944, Lieutenant (jg) John H. Herron and his crew failed to return from patrol.
- 7 March 1944: VB-109 was relocated to a newly established base on Kwajalein Atoll, Marshall Islands. From this location the squadron made attacks and photographic sorties on enemy installations at Ponape and Pakin. Numerous successful masthead attacks were conducted on shipping throughout the patrol area.
- 5–29 April 1944: VB-109 was moved from Kwajalein to Eniwetok. From this location the squadron conducted several mining missions in the Truk Atoll. Attacks were conducted on enemy installations at Oroluk, Ponape, and Poluwat.
- 29 April 1944: A VB-109 PB4Y-1 Liberator mistook the U.S. Navy submarine USS Seahorse (SS-304) for a Japanese submarine and attacked her off Satawan southeast of Truk Atoll while Seahorse was performing lifeguard duty in support of U.S. airstrikes. The PB4Y-1 dropped two bombs as Seahorse crash-dived. Seahorse suffered a damaged antenna, but no other damage and no casualties.
- 1–16 May 1944: Attacks against surface shipping continued with good results, but after the middle of the month enemy shipping was no longer to be found. The emphasis was shifted to attacks on ground installations at Wake Island, Truk, and Poluwat.
- 16 May 1944: During a long-range reconnaissance flight to Truk, Commander Norman M. Miller, the squadron's commanding officer spotted a 5,000-ton freighter anchored in the lagoon. He made a beam attack, releasing three bombs at masthead height, heavily damaging the vessel. Miller then spotted a 10,000-ton ship that immediately exploded after his bomb run, destroying a large portion of the vessel. He then proceeded on to Poluwat, arriving over the Japanese airfield at minimum altitude, and surprised and strafed a formation of 30 enemy soldiers. In this attack he destroyed one truck and an aircraft revetment, and dropped two bombs on a radio station. In his last bomb run on the radio station the Liberator was hit four times by AA fire, one exploding directly above the cockpit, wounding both Miller and his second pilot. Despite his wounds and damage to the aircraft, Commander Miller flew the Liberator 800 miles (1,300 km) back to base for a safe landing. Commander Miller was awarded the Navy Cross.
- June 1944: Most of the squadron's activities in June were spent flying patrols covering the task force moving to attack Saipan. Daily reconnaissance patrols were flown over Wake Island to ensure no enemy attacks would endanger the task force from that quarter. Low level photographic runs were made over Saipan and Tinian during the landings. Occasional bombing and strafing runs on Saipan were made in conjunction with naval vessels offshore.
- 17 June 1944: Lieutenant Bridgeman and crew sank the Japanese submarine Ro-117, which had left Truk on 5 June bound for a position off Saipan. The sinking, originally claimed by the squadron as possible damaged, was confirmed as sunk by Japanese records after the war.
- 12 July–10 August 1944: An advanced echelon detachment was sent to operate from Isley Field, Saipan. A second detachment arrived on 29 July, remaining until 10 August.
- 14 July 1944: VB-109 made the first shore-based aircraft attack on Iwo Jima, damaging ships, airfields, and parked aircraft. On 16 July the squadron's commanding officer flew Marine battalion commanders and intelligence officers over the proposed landing areas at Tinian, giving them an on-site view of the approaches and obstacles they would soon face on the ground.
- 19 July 1944: The squadron made the first land-based aircraft attacks on Chichijima and Hahajima, destroying several ships and aircraft, and damaging numerous shore installations.
- 5 August 1944: Lieutenant Elmer H. Kasperon and his crew failed to return from a night bombing mission over Chichijima.
- 14 August – 12tember Sep 1944: VB-109 departed Eniwetok and returned to NAS Kaneohe Bay. On 23 August the squadron began the return to NAS San Diego, with the last crew arriving on 12 September 1944. All squadron aircraft were turned over to the HEDRON, FAW-14 and all personnel were given home leave.
- 5 October 1944 – February 1945: VPB-109 was reformed at NAAS Camp Kearney, California, with 15 PB4Y-2 Privateer bombers and 18 crews. Training on the new aircraft was completed on 30 January 1945 and preparations were begun for the trans-Pacific flight to NAS Kaneohe Bay, Hawaii. The ground echelon departed on 30 January for Pearl Harbor aboard USS Fanshaw Bay. Aircrews began their departures in elements of three on 11 February 1945, with the last aircraft arriving at Kaneohe on 20 February.
- 11 February – 18 March 1945: As crews continued to arrive, the squadron was put into the training syllabus for combat patrols, bombing, gunnery, and ground school. On 18 March, an RY-2 (the cargo version of the PB4Y-1) was assigned to the squadron's complement by HEDRON, FAW-2.
- 1 Apr 1945: VPB-109 was one of 3 squadrons selected to employ the ASM-N-2 Bat guided bomb. Testing and training on its use continued through the end of the month.
- 10–23 April 1945: VPB-109 deployed to Puerto Princesa, Palawan, coming under the operational control of FAW-10. On 23 April 1945, Lieutenant Commander Hicks and Lieutenant Kennedy dropped the first Bat weapons employed on a combat mission against shipping in Balikpapan harbor. Both devices were defective and did not strike any targets. Conventional bombing missions by the rest of the squadron were carried out with great success against targets on Soebi-Ketjil, Tambelan, South Natoena, Djemadja, Mukah, Pandanseri Refinery, and Cape Bila harbor.
- 28 April 1945: Two of the Bat-equipped Privateers flown by Lieutenant Commander Hicks and Lieutenant Chay again attacked shipping in Balikpapan harbor. Three Bats were released in an attempt to sink a large transport. Two of the Bats went to either side of the vessel, sinking two smaller freighters, while the third executed a sharp right turn to strike a large oil storage tank a quarter of a mile away in the Pandanseri Refinery.
- 30 April 1945: Enemy aircraft attacked Westbrooke Field AAFB, Puerto Princessa, at night damaging three squadron aircraft and injuring one enlisted crewman.
- 1–6 May 1945: Attacks against enemy targets in the area of Borneo and Celebes continued unabated, sinking 45 vessels of all types and destroying numerous ground installations in one week.
- 7–16 May 1945: It soon became obvious that large ship targets justifying the expenditure of Bats were no longer available in the operational area of the squadron outside of Singapore, which was too far for the Bat-equipped bombers to fly and return. A base closer to the Japanese homeland was required, so VPB-109 was relocated to West Field, Tinian, under the operational control of FAW-1. Three days later, on 10 May, the squadron moved to Yontan Airfield, Okinawa. Four days later, a Japanese night attack that damaged one squadron aircraft. A similar attack on 18 May destroyed one aircraft and damaged two others. The frequent enemy night forays precluded night patrols by the squadron, as the bombers could not be serviced or landed during alerts. It was also too dangerous to fly at night, because the fleet shot at anything with wings. The first Bat attack by the squadron while based at Okinawa took place on 13 May with negative results. Attacks on shipping on the 15th and 16th with three Bats was also unsuccessful. The sensitive equipment in the devices was too prone to corrosion and warping in the tropical environment. No test equipment for the Bats had been sent forward with the squadron to permit diagnostics before they were used in combat.
- 17 May 1945: Lieutenant Fairbanks and Lieutenant Warren's aircraft were attacked on patrol by 12 Kawanishi N1K "George" interceptors, of the 343rd Kōkūtai squadron based on Tsushima. Two of the Japanese fighters were shot down with only minor damage to Lieutenant Fairbank's aircraft and two wounded crewmen. A 3rd Japanese interceptor was damaged, but made it back to base (according to Imperial Japanese war records).
- 24 May 1945: The Japanese considered the activities of the squadrons based at Yontan Field to be important enough to merit the expenditure of a specialized suicide attack force. The commandos were flown in under cover of darkness aboard three Ki-21 Sally medium bombers. Two were shot down in flames, along with five of their fighter escorts. The remaining Ki-21 landed wheels up on the airstrip. The attackers quickly dispersed throughout the area, throwing satchel charges and grenades into parked aircraft and engaging the Marine perimeter defense forces in firefights. One VPB-109 aircraft was destroyed and another damaged beyond repair before the commandos were eliminated. Three squadron enlisted personnel were wounded in the crossfire or by shrapnel from the explosions.
- 27 May 1945: Lieutenant Leo E. Kennedy and his crew sank a Japanese destroyer in the first successful Bat attack on the open sea, blowing the entire bow off the vessel. In the same attack, using conventional bombs, Kennedy sank a 2,000-ton freighter and four small freighters and damaged two smaller vessels. For this record-setting action Lieutenant Kennedy was awarded the Navy Cross. Three days later Kennedy was killed by AA fire during a conventional bombing attack on shipping off the mouth of the Yangtze River.
- 29 May 1945: Lieutenants Turner and Warren received reports of large shipping near Shanghai. They dropped two defective Bats with no results on a 6,000- ton and a 4,000-ton freighter located at the mouth of the Yangtze River.
- 31 May 1945: VPB-109 was relocated to West Field, Tinian, with a detachment remaining at Yontan Field, Okinawa. In early July all of the squadron's SWOD personnel were transferred to CASU-7, Yontan Field, Okinawa. The new unit combined the SWOD functions previously performed by VPBs 109, 123, and 124.
- 1–27 July 1945: The squadron established a three aircraft detachment at Central Field, Iwo Jima, joined by the entire squadron on 8 July. Primary missions assigned during this period involved barrier patrols between the U.S. Third Fleet and the Japanese home islands and Dumbo (air-sea rescue) missions for USAAF B-29 crews returning from bombing missions over Japan.
- 28 Jul 1945: VPB-109 returned to Yontan Field, Okinawa. Missions were assigned to conduct barrier patrols off the Shandong Peninsula and air-sea rescue patrols for downed aircrews.
- 5 August 1945: Lieutenant Keeling and crew were shot down with the loss of all hands during a strafing attack on a tanker while on patrol east of Korea.
- 8 Aug 1945: Lieutenants Vadnais and Challis made negative Bat attacks on a large enemy tanker. This was probably the last such attack using this weapon in World War II. The last combat mission by the squadron occurred two days later when Lieutenant Chay and Lieutenant (jg) Moyer sank five small freighters with conventional weapons in the Tsushima Strait.
- 15–24 August 1945: Orders were received to cease attacks on the enemy. Armament was carried for defensive purposes only. On 24 August all patrol activity ceased, and the primary mission assigned to the squadron was that of weather reconnaissance for various elements of the fleet.
- September 1945: VPB-109 returned to NAS San Diego and was disestablished on 12 October 1945.

== Aircraft assignments ==
The squadron was assigned the following aircraft, effective on the dates shown:

- PB4Y-1 Liberator - August 1943
- PB4Y-2 Privateer - December 1944
- RY-2 - March 1945

== Home port assignments ==
The squadron was assigned to these home ports, effective on the dates shown:

- NAS San Diego, California - 2 August 1943
- NAS Kaneohe Bay, Hawaii - 4 November 1943
- NAS San Diego - September 1944
- NAAS Camp Kearney, California - 5 October 1944
- NAS Kaneohe Bay - 11 February 1945
- NAS San Diego - September 1945

== See also ==
- Maritime patrol aircraft
- List of inactive United States Navy aircraft squadrons
- List of United States Navy aircraft squadrons
- List of squadrons in the Dictionary of American Naval Aviation Squadrons
- History of the United States Navy
