= Holtville Airport =

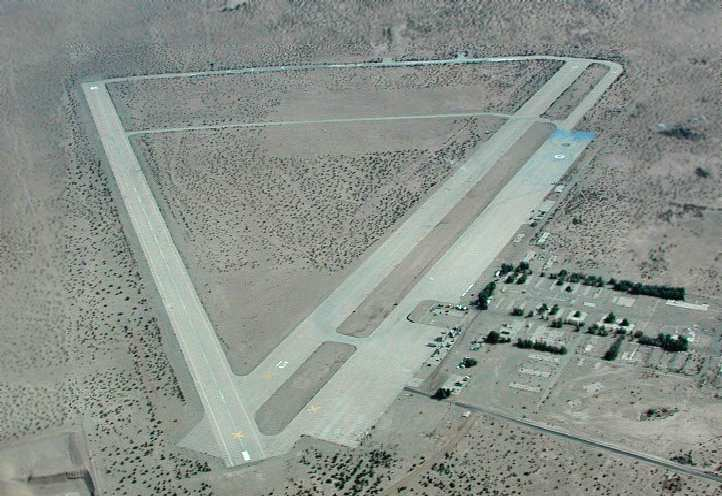
- IATA: none; ICAO: none; FAA LID: L04

Summary
- Airport type: Public
- Owner/Operator: County of Imperial
- Serves: Holtville, California
- Elevation AMSL: 59 ft (18 m)
- Coordinates: 32°50′42″N 115°16′07″W
- Interactive map of Holtville Airport

Runways
Direction	Length		Surface
Direction	ft	m	Surface
8/26	6,000	1,829	Concrete
- Source: Federal Aviation Administration

Holtville Airport (FAA LID: L04) is a county-owned, public-use airport located five nautical miles (9 km) northeast of the central business district of Holtville, a city in Imperial County, California, United States. Holtville was a U.S. Navy airfield during World War II.

== History ==
=== U.S. Navy ===
In 1937 the U.S. Navy purchased 1,397 acres (5.65 km^{2}) to build an airfield to support flight training. Holtville was chosen by the Navy because it boasted 360 days of visual flight rules flying per year. The airfield was commissioned in 1943, with two concrete runways. Holtville was used by the Navy to train pilots in skip bombing, night flying, and air-to-ground rocket firing. F6F Hellcats and F4U Corsairs were among the aircraft operated from Holtville. In 1944 Holtville was significantly expanded. The upgrades included the runway being extended to 6,000 feet (1,800 m) and two new ground training buildings. In 1944 Holtville had a total complement of 2,980 officers and enlisted.

To the east of Holtville Airport 7 miles is the abandoned Sand Hill Naval Auxiliary Landing Field, a single northwest–southeast 4,000-foot paved runway. Also called the Holtville Naval Auxiliary Landing Field and Old Holtville. The landing strip was used for Field Carrier Landing Practice and opened in 1944 for World War 2. For 1944 and 1945 a catapult and arrester system for carrier takeoff and landing training was installed at the runway at 32.832°N 115.152°W. By 1972 the Navy had stopped using the runway, but still owned the land.

=== After the war ===
Following the end of World War II, Holtville was used for a few months to store 111 PV-2 Harpoons. In 1946 It was redesignated from Holtville NAAS to Holtville Airport.

In 1947 Holtville was transferred to Imperial County to be used as a civilian airport.

Holtville may have been reactivated as a military airfield at some point between 1951 and 1955, as it was depicted once again as a Navy airfield on the 1955 San Diego Sectional Aeronautical Chart. It was evidently relinquished by the military (again) at some point between 1955 and 1966, as "Holtville" was depicted as a civil airport on the 1966 San Diego Sectional Chart.

Due to the field's proximity to Yuma MCAS and El Centro NAF, it is apparently still used for infrequent military aircraft training, as the Airport Facility Directory includes the notes "Be alert frequent military training activity during daylight hours & dark; includes tactical aircraft, helicopters & parachuting. No vertical takeoffs or landings permitted at airport AV-8 Harrier."

A section of the airfield's runways was designated as Holtville Aerodrome International Raceway (HAIR), and was regularly used by the San Diego Region of the Sports Car Club of America from approximately 1965 to 2001.

== Proposed expansion ==
In November 2015, Representative Juan Vargas (D-51) introduced legislation in the US Congress to transfer 3,500 acres from the Bureau of Land Management to Imperial County to allow the Holtville Airport to be expanded into a regional cargo airport.

== Facilities ==
Holtville Airport covers an area of 1,100 acres (450 ha) at an elevation of 59 feet (18 m) above mean sea level. It has one runway designated 8/26 with a concrete surface measuring 6,000 by 150 feet (1,829 × 46 m). Federal Aviation Administration records show the airport and runway as being "closed indefinitely".

For the 12-month period ending March 6, 2000, there were no recorded aircraft operations and no aircraft based at the airport. There are, however, photos of USMC and USN V-22 Osprey on the strip on Google Maps.

== See also ==
- California during World War II
