= 449th Flying Training Squadron =

449th Flying Training Squadron (Currently 449th Expeditionary Flying Training Squadron)

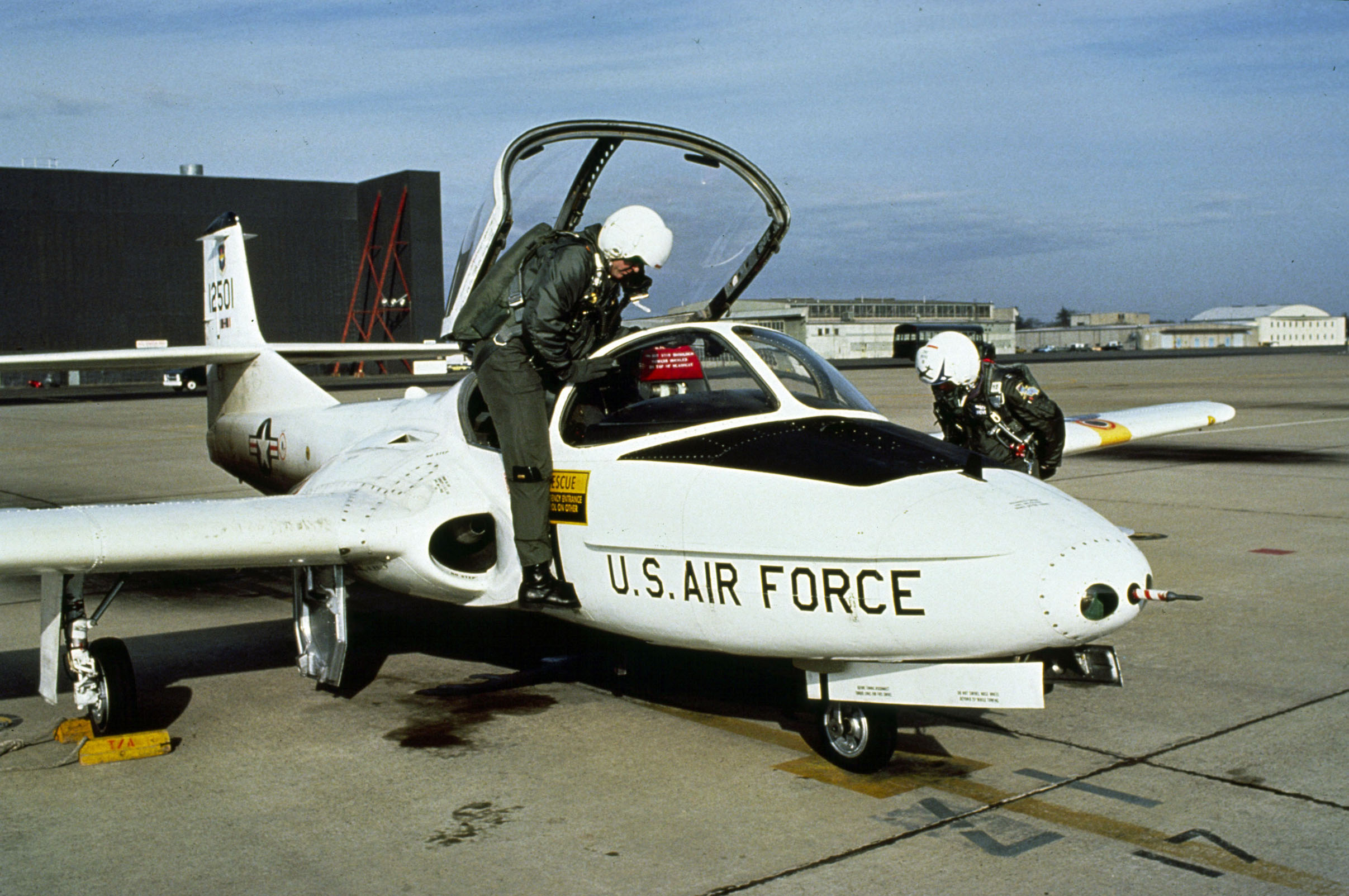
- Cessna T-37 at Mather Air Force Base
- Active: 1942–1945; 1947–1949; 1973–1988
- Country: United States
- Branch: United States Air Force
- Role: Pilot Training
- Part of: Air Combat Command
- Engagements: European Theater of Operations
- Decorations: Distinguished Unit Citation; Air Force Outstanding Unit Award

Insignia
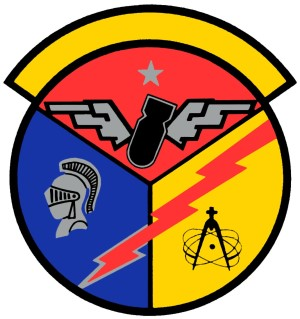
- 449th Expeditionary Flying Training Squadron emblem (Note: Approved 30 May 1973. This is the former emblem of the 3536th Navigator Training Squadron placed on a disc.)

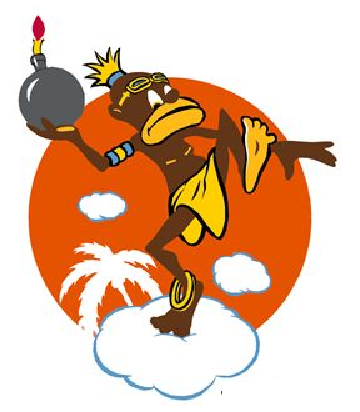
- 449th Bombardment Squadron emblem (Note: Approved 12 July 1943. Description: Over and through an orange disc, a black caricatured Negro savage, feet and lips brown, wearing a yellow loin cloth and goggles blue, green headdress and arm bracelets, green rings about the ankles, balanced on right foot on a white cloud formation, outlined blue, in base, and throwing a large gray fire bomb, held aloft in right hand, all in front of a white silhouette palm tree and two small white cloud formations.)
- World War II Fuselage Code: PN

The 449th Expeditionary Flying Training Squadron is a provisional United States Air Force unit. It was first activated as the 449th Bombardment Squadron in July 1942. After training in the United States, it deployed to the European Theater of Operations (ETO) in December 1942. It engaged in combat operations from 1943 to 1945, earning a Distinguished Unit Citation for demonstrating the effectiveness of medium bombers in the ETO. Following V-E Day, it participated in the disarmament of the Luftwaffe, until September 1945, when it returned to the United States for inactivation.

The squadron served in the reserves from October 1947 to June 1949, when it was inactivated as the military budget was reduced, although it does not appear to have been fully manned or equipped with operational aircraft at this time.

In 1973, Air Training Command was converting its flying training units from MAJCON status. As part of this reorganization, the squadron was redesignated the 449th Flying Training Squadron and replaced the 3536th Navigator Training Squadron at Mather Air Force Base, California. It conducted flight training for members of the United States military and foreign allies until inactivating in May 1993 as Mather prepared for closure.

On 28 October 2008, it was converted to provisional status as the 449th Expeditionary Flying Training Squadron and assigned to Air Combat Command to activate or inactivate as needed, but does not appear to have been active.

== History ==
=== World War II ===
==== Initial organization and training ====
The squadron was first activated at MacDill Field, Florida on 17 July 1942 as the 449th Bombardment Squadron, one of the four original squadrons of the 322nd Bombardment Group. However, it did not receive its initial cadre until 7 August. It was equipped with Martin B-26 Marauders and trained with them at MacDill and at Drane Field, Florida. The ground echelon of the squadron departed for the Port of Embarkation in November and sailed for the United Kingdom aboard the RMS Queen Elizabeth on 24 November, arriving in the United Kingdom six days later. The air echelon continued training in Florida until it began to ferry its Marauders from Morrison Field to Europe via the South Atlantic ferry route as new aircraft became available. The 449th was the last squadron of the group to leave the United States, not departing until April 1943, with its last B-26 arriving on 29 May 1943.

==== Combat in the European Theater ====
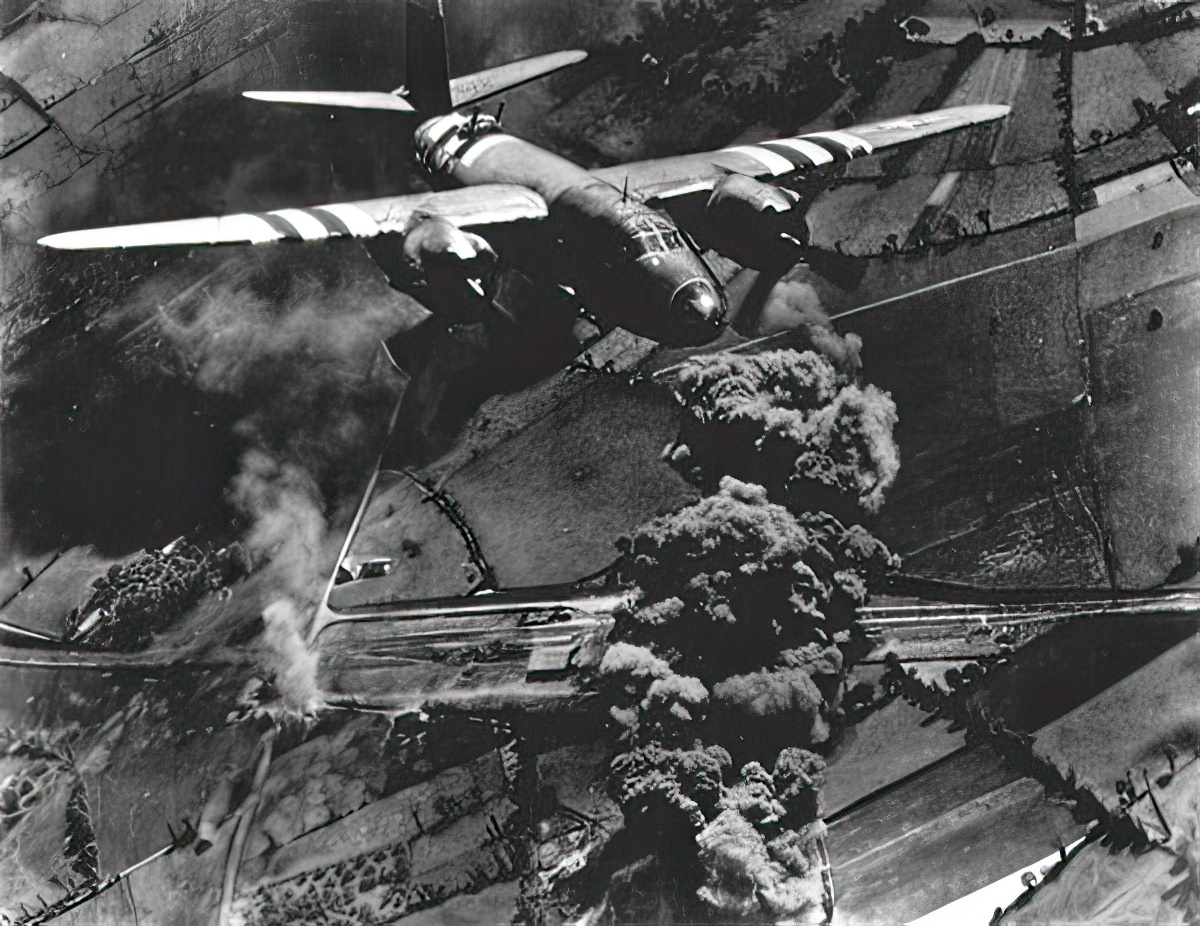
B-26 of the 322d Bombardment Group on a bomb run

The ground echelon was established at RAF Bury St Edmunds, its first combat station on 1 December 1942. The 322d Group flew its first mission, and the first B-26 Marauder mission in the European Theater of Operations, on 14 May against an electrical power plant near IJmuiden in the Netherlands using low level attack tactics. Three days later, it dispatched eleven planes for a repeat low level attack on the IJmuiden power plant and another at Haarlem in the Netherlands. One plane returned early due to a mechanical malfunction. The remaining ten aircraft and their crews were lost to enemy action. For these actions and for demonstrating the effectiveness of medium bombers, the 322nd Group, including the squadron, was awarded the Distinguished Unit Citation. (Note: It does not appear that any squadron aircraft participated in the two raids of May 1943. Following the raids, the 322nd was withdrawn from combat for training ln medium altitude bombing and equipping its planes for that tactic, returning to combat on 17 July. See Freeman, p. 57 (noting that the 451st Bombardment Squadron had arrived in theater and implying that the 449th had not yet done so.) Although the squadron was cited for the period beginning in May, the Air Force Historical Research Agency edited the start date of the award to the squadron to 17 July.)

In June 1943, the squadron, along with all other B-26 units in England moved to Essex, an area where it was planned to build up a tactical air force for the forthcoming invasion of Europe, with the 449th arriving at RAF Great Saling on 12 June. Once the squadron entered combat, enemy airfields were its principal targets through February 1944, but it also attacked power stations, shipyards, construction works, marshalling yards and other targets. In March 1944, its emphasis shifted to railway and highway bridges, and oil storage facilities in preparation for Operation Overlord, the invasion of Normandy. It also participated in Operation Crossbow, the attacks on V-1 flying bomb and V-2 rocket launch sites.

On D-Day, the squadron attacked coastal defenses and artillery batteries. It supported the Allies in the Battle for Caen and in Operation Cobra, the breakout at Saint Lo in July. Through August and September, it provided air support for the drive of United States Third Army across Northern France.

In late September, the squadron moved from England to Beauvais/Tille Airfield, France. It bombed bridges, road junctions, defended villages, and ordnance depots in the assault on the Siegfried Line from October through December of 1944. During the Battle of the Bulge, it flew attacks on railroad bridges to cut German lines of communications. From then until it flew its last mission on 24 April 1945, it concentrated on communications, bridges, marshalling yards and fuel dumps.

Following V-E Day, the 449th moved to Hanau-Langendiebach Airfield as part of the military occupation force. It engaged in inventorying and disassembling Luftwaffe equipment until September 1945. In December it returned to the United States and was inactivated at the Port of Embarkation on 11 December 1945.

=== Air Force reserve ===
The squadron was reactivated on 4 October 1947 at Northeast Philadelphia Airport, Pennsylvania. It does not appear to have been fully manned and was equipped only with trainer aircraft. In July 1948 Continental Air Command (ConAC) assumed responsibility for managing reserve and Air National Guard units from ADC. President Truman’s reduced 1949 defense budget required reductions in the number of units in the Air Force, and the 449th was inactivated and not replaced as reserve flying operations at what was now North Philadelphia Airport ceased.

=== Navigator training ===
==== Background ====
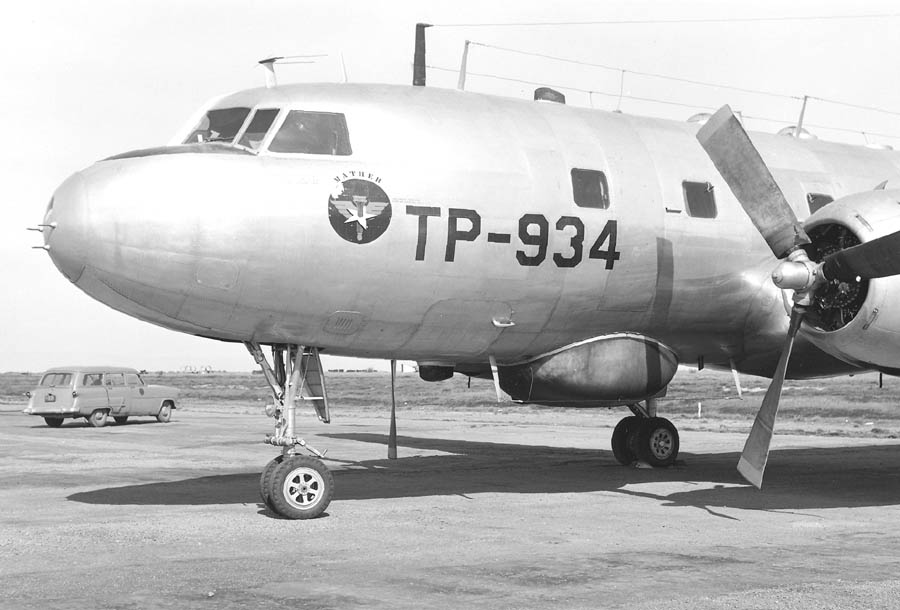
Convair T-29C from Mather AFB

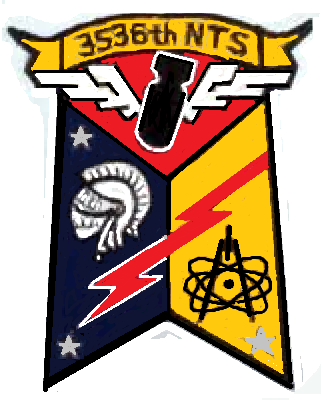
3536 Navigator Training Sq emblem

Air Training Command (ATC) organized the 3536th Bombardier Training Squadron at Mather Air Force Base, California. It was later redesignated the 3536th Observer Training Squadron in 1953, 3536th Aircraft Observer Training Squadron on 31 August 1954 and finally, on 15 November 1956, the 3536th Navigator Training Squadron. The squadron was initially equipped with Boeing TB-50 Superfortresses to train bombardiers, radar observers and radar navigators on the K-3 bombardment/navigation system used by the Convair B-36 Peacemaker. In the early 1950s, later model TB-50Hs equipped the squadron and its focus shifted to training Boeing B-47 Stratojet crewmembers. Later, the squadron used Douglas C-54s and North American B-25 Mitchells to train bombardiers. By the 1960s, training was conducted with Convair T-29 Flying Classrooms.

However, the 3536th was a MAJCON unit, created by ATC. MAJCON units could not carry a permanent history or lineage. ATC received authority from Headquarters USAF to discontinue its MAJCON flying training wings and to activate Air Force controlled (AFCON) units, most of which were inactive at the time, which could carry a lineage and history.

==== Training Operations ====
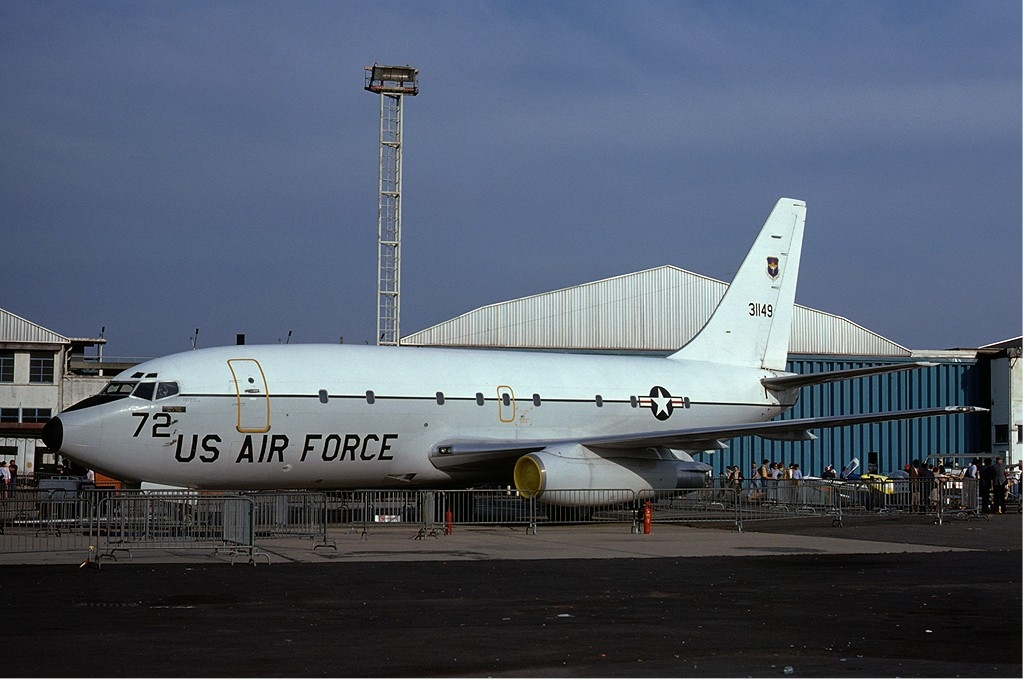
Boeing T-43A Bobcat

On 1 April 1973, the squadron, now designated the 449th Flying Training Squadron, absorbed the mission, personnel and equipment of the 3536th Navigator Training Squadron. In May 1975, the Chief of Staff, United States Air Force and the Chief of Naval Operations agreed to consolidate navigator training, and the squadron began training United States Navy and United States Marine Corps and United States Coast Guard navigators. (Note: The Coast Guard withdrew from this program in 1979. Manning, et al., p. 222) In 1978, the first females began navigator training. It conducted undergraduate navigator training for USAF, United States Navy, United States Marine Corps, and United States allies from 1973 until 1992. In 1989, the base closure commission recommended that Mather be closed. The Air Force moved its navigator training to Randolph Air Force Base, Texas and the squadron was inactivated on 31 May 1993 as Mather drew down in preparing for closing on 1 October.

=== Expeditionary unit ===
On 28 October 2008, the squadron was converted to provisional status as the 449th Expeditionary Flying Training Squadron and assigned to Air Combat Command to activate or inactivate as needed. Although there seems to be no publicly available information concerning the squadron's activation as an expeditionary unit, it was awarded campaign credit for action in Afghanistan.

== Lineage ==
- Constituted as the 449th Bombardment Squadron (Medium) on 19 June 1942

Activated on 17 July 1942
Redesignated 449th Bombardment Squadron, Medium on 20 August 1943
Inactivated on 11 December 1945

- Redesignated 449th Bombardment Squadron, Light on 13 August 1947

Activated in the reserve on 4 October 1947
Inactivated on 27 June 1949

- Redesignated 449th Flying Training Squadron on 28 July 1972

Activated on 1 April 1973
Inactivated on 31 May 1993

- Redesignated 449th Expeditionary Flying Training Squadron and converted to provisional status on 28 October 2008

=== Assignments ===
- 322d Bombardment Group, 17 July 1942 – 11 December 1945
- 322d Bombardment Group, 4 October 1947 – 27 June 1949
- 323d Flying Training Wing, 1 April 1973
- 323d Operations Group, 15 December 1991 – 31 May 1993
- Air Combat Command, to activate or inactivate at any time after 28 October 2008

=== Stations ===
- MacDill Field, Florida, 17 July 1942
- Drane Field, Florida, 22 September 1942 – 13 November 1942
- Camp Kilmer, New Jersey, 15–23 November 1942
- RAF Bury St Edmunds (Rougham Airdrome) (AAF-468), England, 1 December 1942
- RAF Great Saling (later Andrews Field) (AAF-485), England, 12 June 1943
- Beauvais/Tille Airfield (A-61) (also B-42), France, 29 September 1944
- Le Culot Airfield (A-89) (also B-68), Belgium, 31 March 1945
- Hanau-Langendiebach Airfield (Y-91), Germany, July 1945
- Fritzlar Airfield (Y-86), Germany, September 1945
- Clastres Airfield (A-71), France, c. 1 October – 3 December 1945
- Camp Kilmer, New Jersey, 9–11 December 1945
- Northeast Philadelphia Airport (later North Philadelphia Airport), Pennsylvania, 4 October 1947 – 27 June 1949
- Mather Air Force Base, California, 1 April 1973 – 31 May 1993

=== Aircraft ===
- Martin B-26 Marauder (1942–1945)
- North American AT-6 Texan (1947–1949)
- Beechcraft AT-11 Kansan (1947–1949)
- Convair T-29 Flying Classroom (1973–1974)
- Cessna T-37 Tweet (1974–1992)
- Boeing T-43 Bobcat (1973–1992)

=== Awards and campaigns ===
Award streamer	Award	Dates	Notes
	Distinguished Unit Citation	[17 July] 1943 – 24 July 1944	European Theater of Operations, 449th Bombardment Squadron
	Air Force Outstanding Unit Award	1 April – 31 December 1973	449th Flying Training Squadron
	Air Force Outstanding Unit Award	1 January 1976 – 28 February 1977	449th Flying Training Squadron
	Air Force Outstanding Unit Award	1 January 1978 – 30 April 1979	449th Flying Training Squadron
	Air Force Outstanding Unit Award	1 January 1980 – 30 April 1981	449th Flying Training Squadron

Campaign Streamer	Campaign	Dates	Notes
	Air Offensive, Europe	17 July 1943–5 June 1944	449th Bombardment Squadron
	Air Combat, EAME Theater	17 July 1943–11 May 1945	449th Bombardment Squadron
	Normandy	6 June 1944–24 July 1944	449th Bombardment Squadron
	Northern France	25 July 1944–14 September 1944	449th Bombardment Squadron
	Rhineland	15 September 1944–21 March 1945	449th Bombardment Squadron
	Ardennes-Alsace	16 December 1944–25 January 1945	449th Bombardment Squadron
	Central Europe	22 March 1944–21 May 1945	449th Bombardment Squadron
	Consolidation III	unknown	449th Expeditionary Flying Training Squadron

== See also ==
- List of Martin B-26 Marauder operators
