= 005 (disambiguation) =

005 is a Sega video game from 1981.

005 may also refer to:

- Lufthansa Flight 005, a scheduled flight en route from Frankfurt to Bremen
- "005", a fictional British secret service agent; see 00 Agent
- Tyrrell 005, a 1972 Formula One race car
- BAR 005, a 2003 Formula One race car

== See also ==
- O05, Rogers Field airport
- 0O5, University Airport
