= Museum of Flight and Aerial Firefighting =

- Location within Wyoming
- Established: 1987
- Location: Greybull, Wyoming
- Coordinates: 44.5104°N 108.0851°W
- Type: Aviation museum
- Curator: Robert Hawkins
- Website: www.museumofflight.us

The Museum of Flight and Aerial Firefighting is an aviation museum located at the South Big Horn County Airport in Greybull, Wyoming focused on the history of aerial firefighting.

== History ==
Hawkins and Powers Aviation was founded at the airport in 1969 as an aerial firefighting outfit. It maintained a large collection of stored airtankers as a boneyard at the airport and, over time, a number of the airframes were towed to the south side of the airport where a small museum was opened in 1992. The museum was initially established five years prior, when the company became embroiled in the U.S. Forest Service airtanker scandal, in which former U.S. military aircraft that were allegedly to go to the Forest Service in exchange for older retired military aircraft instead ended up in the hands of private companies. This was followed by a pair of accidents which led to the grounding of their fleet and the company was sold in 2006.

== Exhibits ==
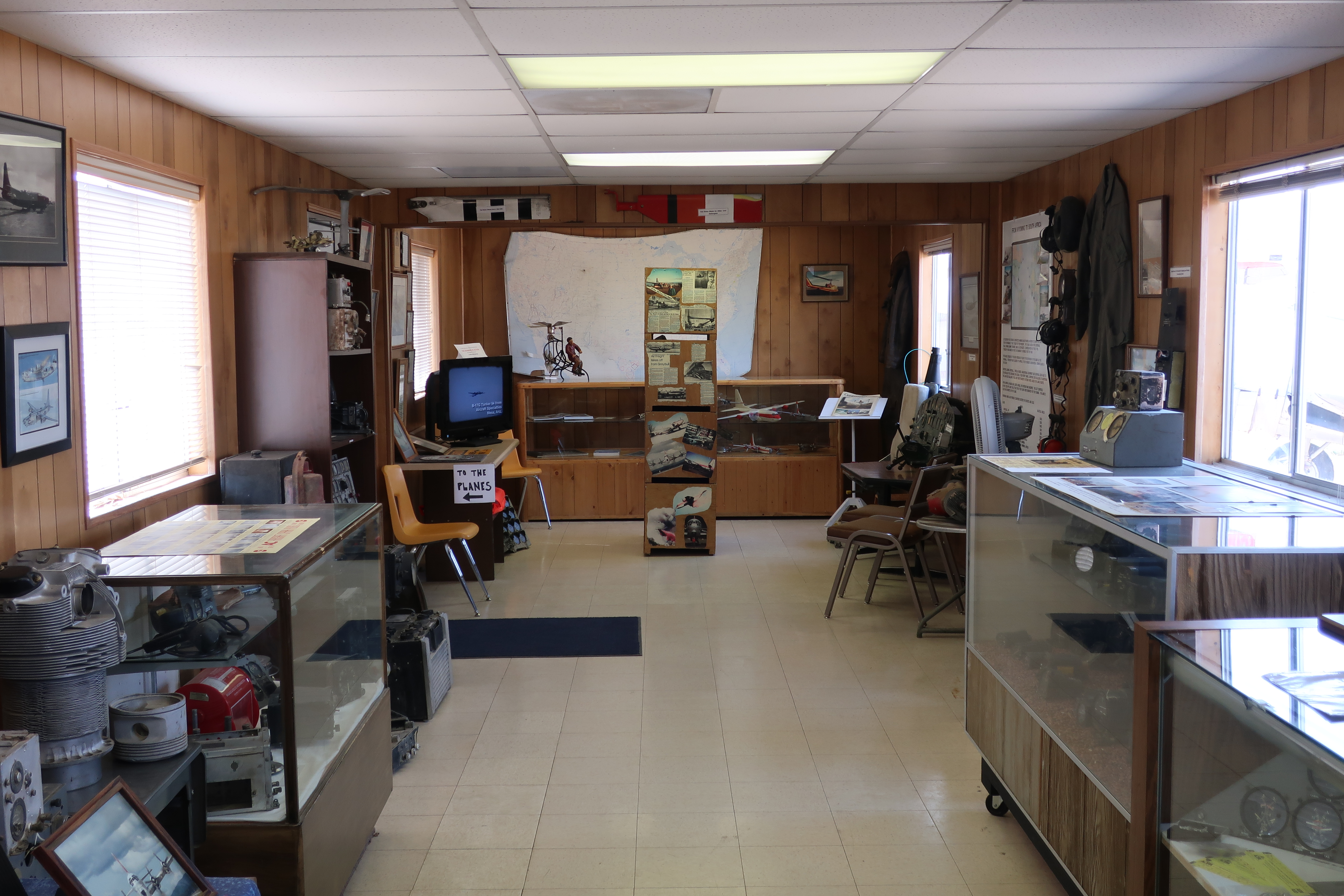
Museum interior

Exhibits include a memorial to the flight crews killed in the 2002 airtanker crashes.

== Collection ==
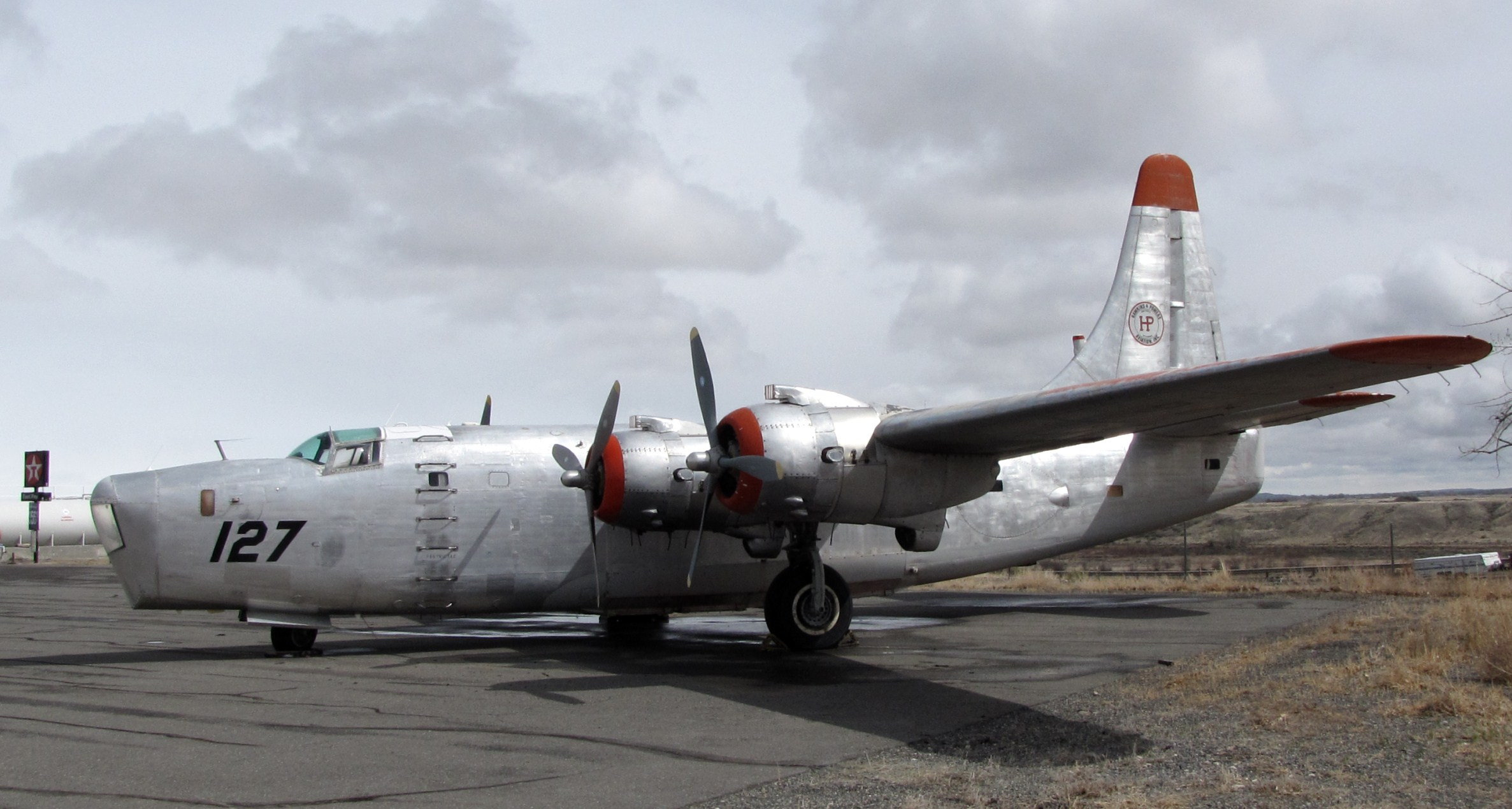
Consolidated PB4Y Privateer

- Aero Commander 500
- Beechcraft C-45F Expeditor N7391C (c/n 8460)
- Boeing KC-97 Stratofreighter N1365N marked as tanker 97
- Consolidated PB4Y-2 Privateer N6884C (c/n 59701) marked as tanker 127
- Consolidated PB4Y-2 Privateer N7962C (c/n 59882) marked as tanker 126
- Fairchild C-119G Flying Boxcar N5215R (c/n 10773)
- Fairchild C-119G Flying Boxcar N3935 (c/n 10824), marked as tanker 136
- Lockheed P2V-7 Neptune
