= R2Y =

R2Y may refer to:

- Yokosuka R2Y
- Consolidated R2Y
