= Consolidated PB4Y-2 Privateer =

Patrol bomber of the US Navy, 1943

PB4Y-2/P4Y-2 Privateer
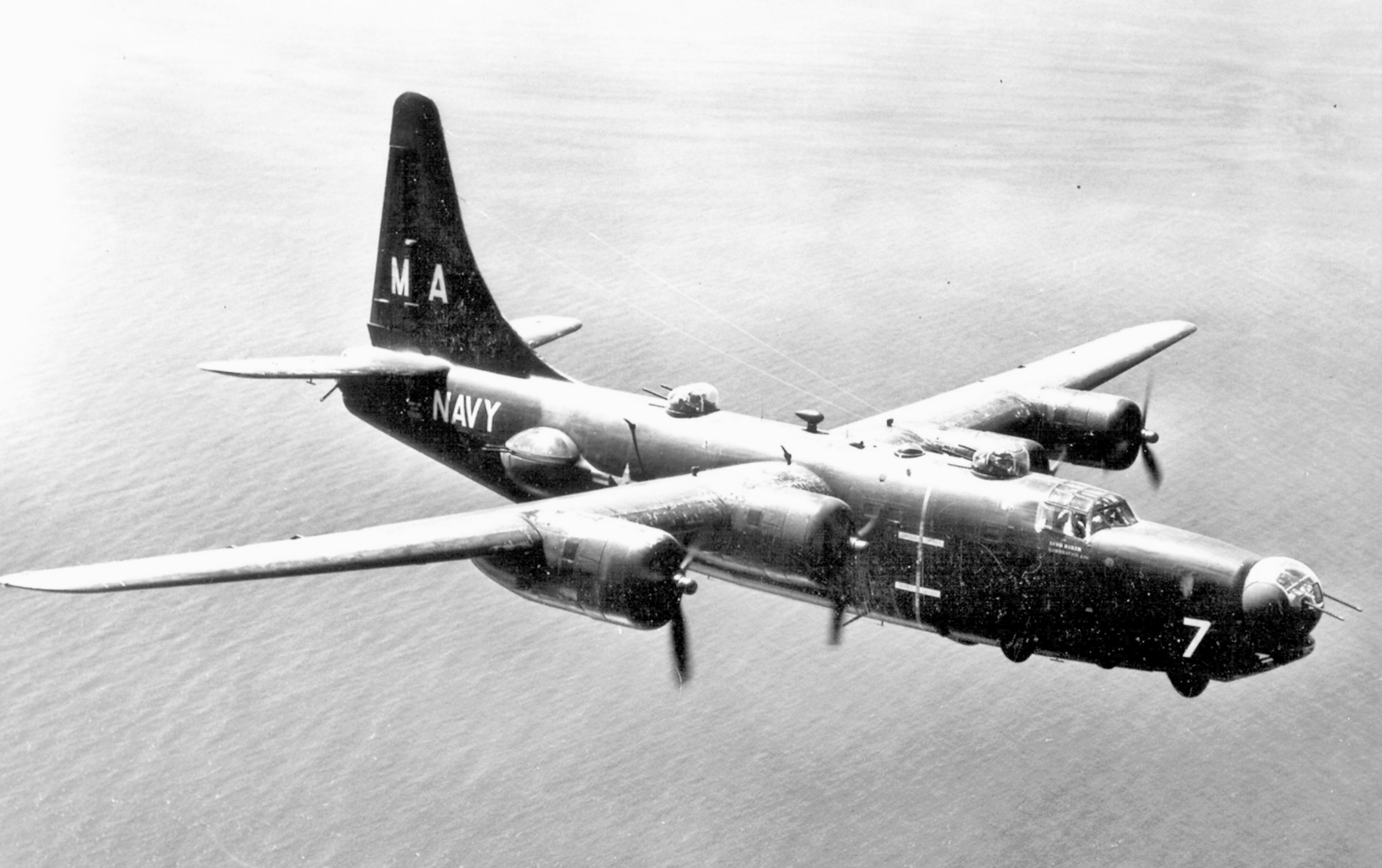
- U.S. Navy PB4Y-2 from VP-23 in flight.

General information
- Type: Maritime patrol bomber
- National origin: United States
- Manufacturer: Consolidated Aircraft
- Primary users: United States Navy United States Coast Guard
- Number built: 739

History
- Manufactured: 1943–1945
- Introduction date: 1943
- Retired: 1954, U.S. Navy; 1958, U.S. Coast Guard
- Developed from: Consolidated B-24 Liberator

The Consolidated PB4Y-2 Privateer is an American World War II and Korean War era patrol bomber of the United States Navy derived from the Consolidated B-24 Liberator. The Navy had been using B-24s with only minor modifications as the PB4Y-1 Liberator, and along with maritime patrol Liberators used by RAF Coastal Command, this type of patrol plane was proven successful. A fully navalized design was desired, and Consolidated developed a dedicated long-range patrol bomber with tests begun in 1943, designated PB4Y-2 Privateer. The first version of the Privateer flew in September 1943 with production versions arriving in March 1944. In 1951, the type was redesignated P4Y-2 Privateer. A further designation change occurred in September 1962, when the remaining US Navy Privateers (all having previously been converted to drone configuration as P4Y-2K) were redesignated QP-4B.

== Design and development ==
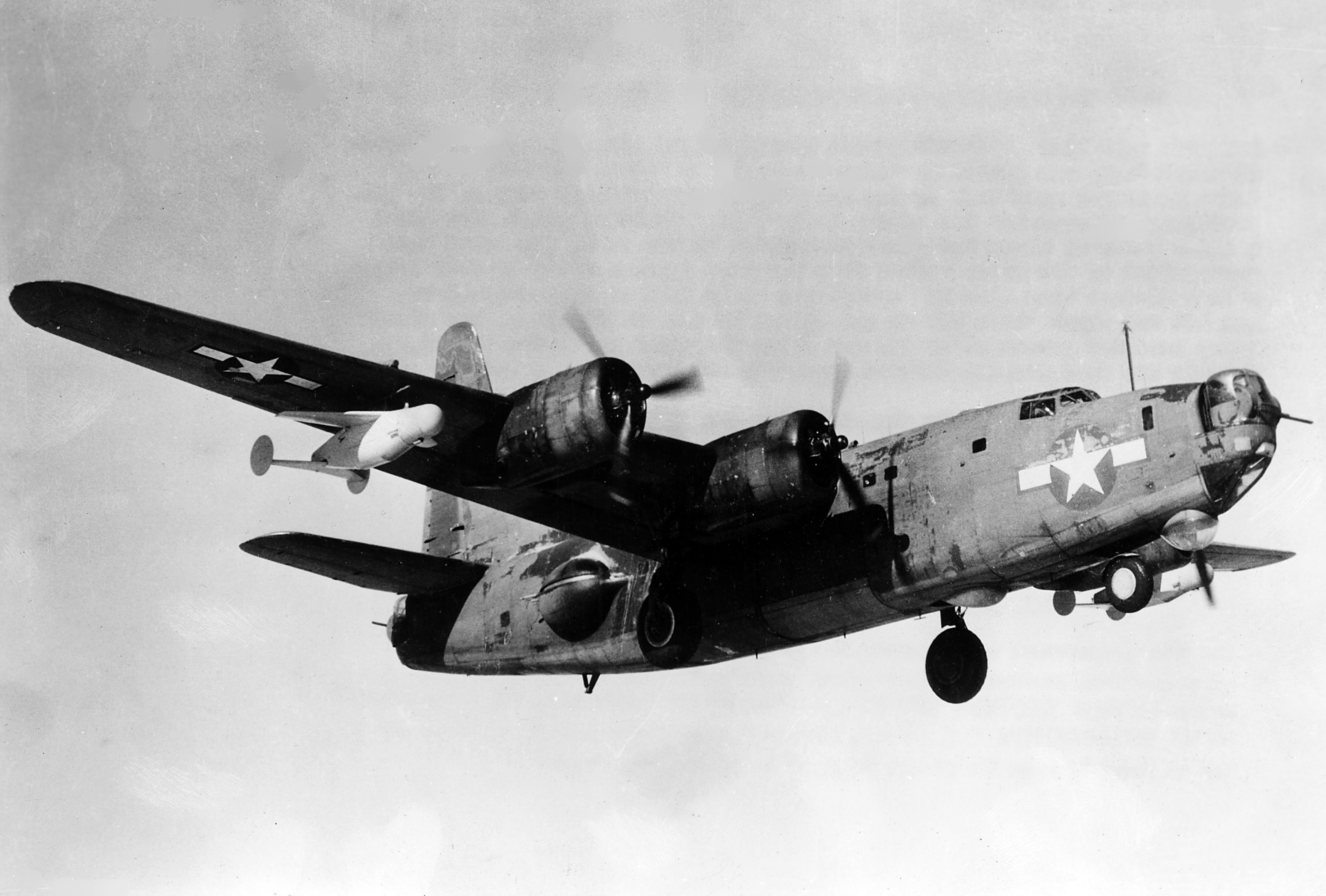
A PB4Y-2B carrying ASM-N-2 Bat glide bombs.

The Privateer was externally similar to the Liberator, but the fuselage was longer to accommodate a flight engineer's station, and it had a tall single vertical stabilizer rather than the B-24's twin tail configuration. The Navy wanted a flight engineer crewmember to reduce pilot fatigue on long duration over water patrols. The single vertical tail was adopted from the United States Army Air Forces' canceled B-24N design (and was slightly taller on the Privateer) because it would increase stability at low to medium altitudes for maritime patrol. The Ford Motor Company, which produced B-24s for the USAAF, had earlier built an experimental variant (B-24K) using a single tail. Aircraft handling was improved. The single tail design was used on the B-32 Dominator and PB4Y-2 and was slated for the proposed B-24N production model to be built by Ford, but that order (for several thousand bombers) was canceled on 31 May 1945.

Defensive armament on the PB4Y-2 was increased to twelve .50-in (12.7 mm) M2 Browning machine guns in six power-operated turrets (two dorsal, two waist, nose and tail); the B-24's ventral, retractable Sperry ball turret was omitted. Turbosuperchargers were not fitted to the Privateer's engines since maritime patrol missions were not usually flown at high altitude, improving performance and also saving weight.

The navigator's astrodome was moved from its (B-24/PB4Y-1) position on the aircraft's upper nose to behind the first dorsal gun turret. Electronic countermeasure (ECM), communication and radar antennas also protruded or were enclosed in fairings at various locations on the fuselage of the Privateer, including a manually retractable AN/APS-2 radome behind the nose wheel well.

The Navy eventually took delivery of 739 Privateers, the majority after the end of the war. Several PB4Y-2 squadrons saw operational service in the Pacific theater through August 1945 in the reconnaissance, search and rescue, electronic countermeasures, communication relay, and anti-shipping roles (the latter with the ASM-N-2 "Bat" radar-guided bomb).

== Operational history ==
The Privateer entered U.S. Navy service during early 1944, Patrol Bomber Squadrons 118 and 119 (VPB-118 and VPB-119) being the first Fleet squadrons to equip with the aircraft. The first overseas deployment began on 6 January 1945, when VPB-118 left for operations in the Marianas. On 2 March 1945 VPB-119 began "offensive search" missions out of Clark Field on Luzon in the Philippines, flying sectored searches of the seas and coastlines extending from the Gulf of Tonkin in the south, along the Chinese coast, and beyond Okinawa in the north.

Privateers were used as typhoon/hurricane hunters from 1945 to the mid-1950s. One aircraft, designated BuNo 59415 of VPB-119, went down when it experienced mechanical trouble while investigating a Category 1 typhoon near Batan Island in the Philippines. It attempted to land on the island, but was unable to do so and crashed. It was one of only six hurricane hunter flights ever lost, and the only one found. Another P4Y-2S, designated BuNo 59716 of Squadron VW-3 (formerly VJ-1), was lost during reconnaissance of Super Typhoon Doris on 16 December 1953. Flying out of NAS Agana, Guam, the Privateer with a crew of nine was tracking Typhoon Doris with sustained winds of 90-95 knots near the small island of Agrihan north of Guam. No sign of the crew nor wreckage of the plane was ever found.

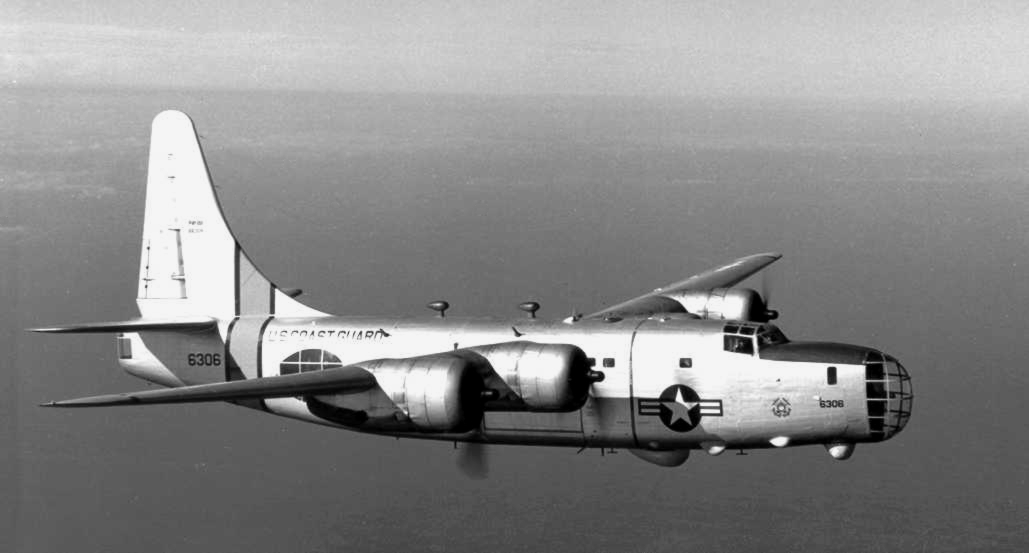
U.S. Coast Guard P4Y-2G BuNo 66306

PB4Y-2s were also used during the Korean War to fly "Firefly" night illumination missions dropping parachute flares to detect North Korean and Chinese seaborne infiltrators. In addition, Privateers were used by the U.S. Navy for signals intelligence (SIGINT) flights off of the coast of the Soviet Union and the People's Republic of China. On 8 April 1950, Soviet La-11 fighters shot down a U.S. Navy PB4Y-2 Privateer (BuNo 59645) over the Baltic Sea, off the coast of Liepāja, Latvia. Nicknamed the "Turbulent Turtle," the aircraft was assigned to Patrol Squadron 26 (VP-26), Det A.

The French Aéronavale was supplied with Privateers via the Mutual Defense Assistance Act, which they used as bombers during the Indochina War and later operated out of Bizerte, Tunisia and Algiers.

All U.S. Navy PB4Y-2s were retired by 1954, though unarmed PB4Y-2G Privateers served until 1958 with the Coast Guard before being auctioned off for salvage.

The Navy dropped the patrol-bomber designation in 1951 and its remaining PB4Y-2s were redesignated P4Y-2 Privateer. (The earlier XP4Y-1 Corregidor was a completely different design, based on the Consolidated Model 31 twin-engine flying boat.) PB4Y-2s were still being used as drones in the 1950s/early 1960s, designated PB4Y-2K, and P4Y-2K after 1951. They were then redesignated QP-4B under the 1962 United States Tri-Service aircraft designation system, becoming part of the new patrol number series between the Lockheed P-3 Orion and the Martin P-5 Marlin.

A number of PB4Ys were supplied to the Republic of China Air Force for use in missions over the People's Republic of China. One was shot down by ground fire on 12 September 1954, near Xiamen, People's Republic of China. The crew of nine was killed. Another was shot down on 15 February 1961 by Burmese Hawker Sea Fury fighter aircraft, near the Thai-Burmese border, killing five members of the crew. Two other crew members were taken prisoner. This aircraft was carrying supplies for Chinese Kuomintang forces fighting in northern Burma.

=== Privateers in aerial firefighting ===
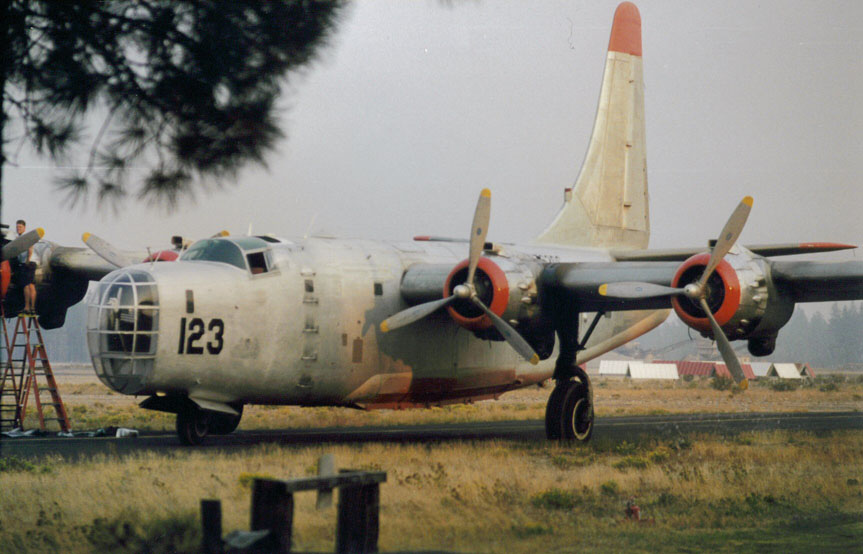
P4Y-2 Tanker 123 BuNo 66260 (N7620C), of Hawkins & Powers in service supporting the CDF, at Chester Air Attack Base in the late 1990s—crashed 18 July 2002.

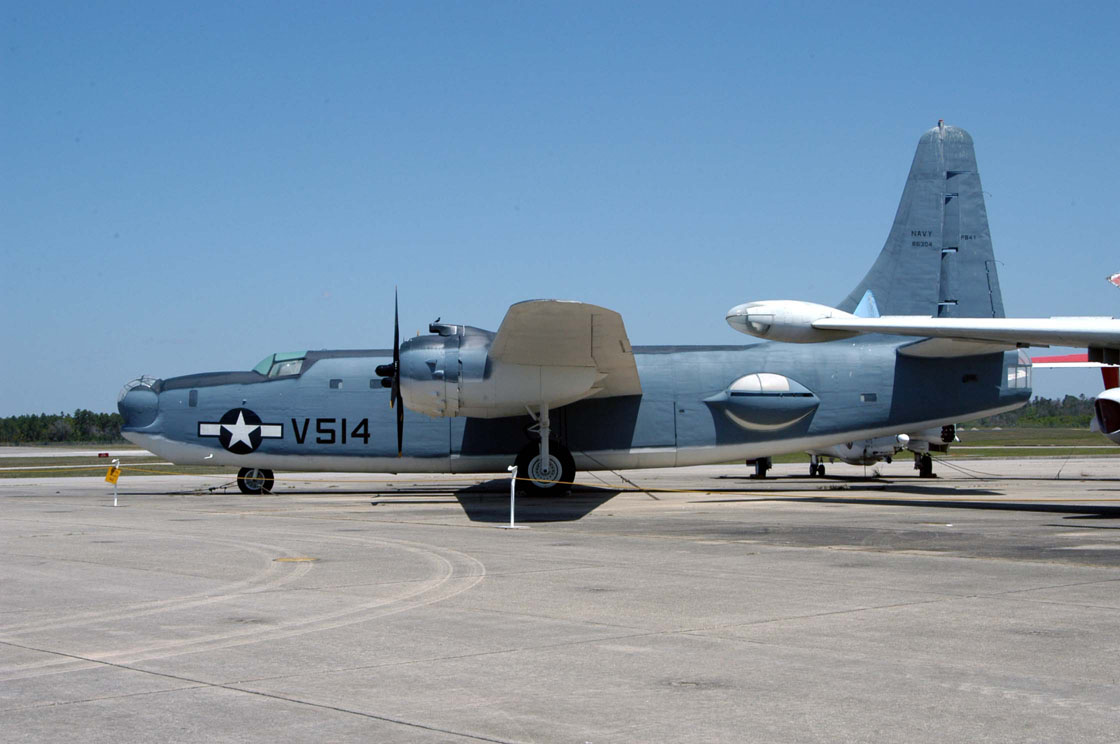
PB4Y-2 BuNo 66261 (marked as BuNo 66304) in the collection of the National Naval Aviation Museum at NAS Pensacola, Florida.

A limited number of refitted PB4Ys and P4Ys continued in civilian service as airtankers, dropping fire retardant on forest fires throughout the western United States. On 18 July 2002, one such refitted P4Y, BuNo 66260 operated by Hawkins and Powers Aviation of Greybull, Wyoming broke up in flight while flying over a wildfire near Rocky Mountain National Park. Both crew members were killed in the accident, and the Federal Aviation Administration temporarily grounded all large air tankers in the region. Despite the fact that the crash was the result of poor maintenance, and a much newer C-130 based aircraft also broke apart due to similar stresses, all remaining Privateers were retired. (See 2002 United States airtanker crashes.)

== Variants ==
YPB4Y-2
prototypes, three built.
PB4Y-2
main production version, 736 built.
PB4Y-2B
PB4Y-2s equipped to launch ASM-N-2 Bat air-to-surface missiles. Redesignated P4Y-2B in 1951.
PB4Y-2M
PB4Y-2s converted for weather reconnaissance. Redesignated P4Y-2M in 1951.
PB4Y-2S
PB4Y-2s equipped with anti-submarine radar. Redesignated P4Y-2S in 1951.
PB4Y-2G
PB4Y-2s converted for air-sea rescue and weather reconnaissance duties with the U.S. Coast Guard. Redesignated P4Y-2G in 1951.
PB4Y-2K
PB4Y-2s converted to target drones. Redesignated P4Y-2K in 1951 and QP-4B in 1962.

== Operators ==
Canada
Republic of China
France
Honduras
United States

- United States Navy
- United States Coast Guard

== Surviving aircraft ==
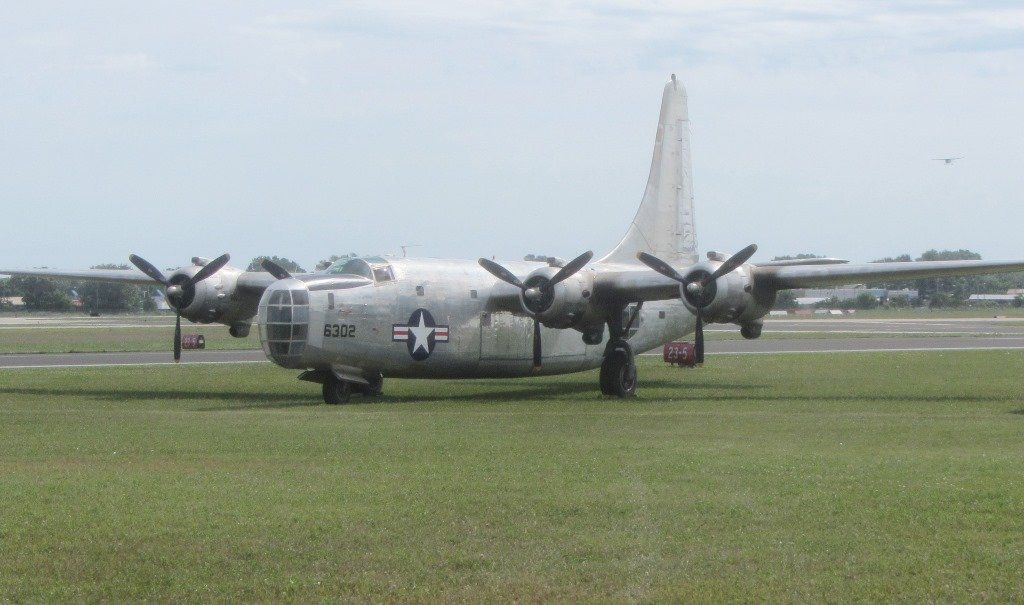
P4Y-2G Super Privateer BuNo 66302.

Airworthy

P4Y-2G

- 66302 – based in Casa Grande, Arizona.

On display

PB4Y-2

- 59701 – Museum of Flight and Aerial Firefighting in Greybull, Wyoming.
- 59819 – Pima Air and Space Museum in Tucson, Arizona.
- 59876 – Michigan Flight Museum in Belleville, Michigan.
- 59882 – Museum of Flight and Aerial Firefighting in Greybull, Wyoming.
- 59932 (nose only) Over Exposed – The National WWII Museum in New Orleans, Louisiana. Displayed as a B-24D.
- 66261 – National Naval Aviation Museum at Naval Air Station Pensacola, Florida.
- 66300 – Yanks Air Museum in Chino, California.

== Specifications (PB4Y-2) ==
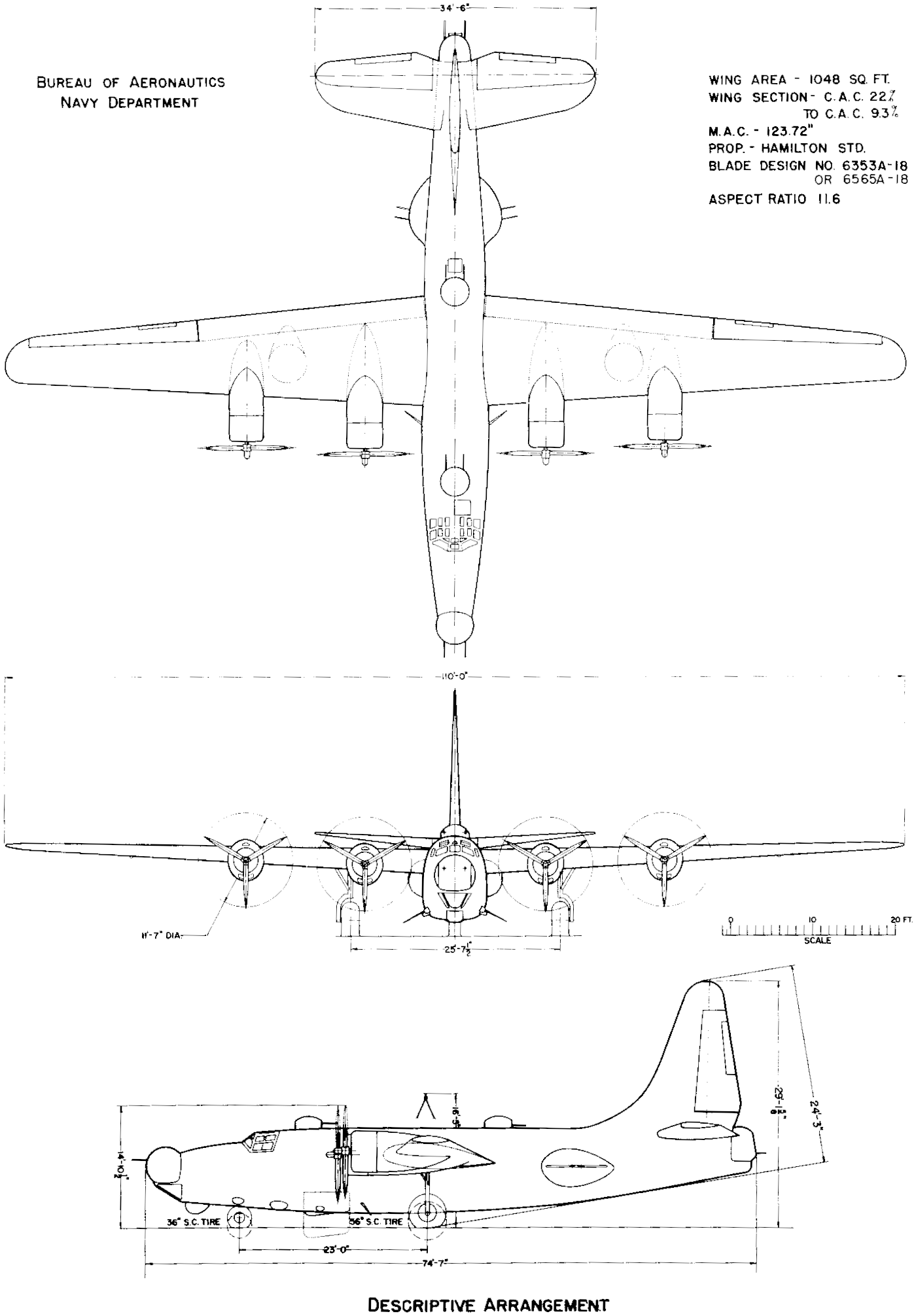
3-view line drawing of the Consolidated PB4Y-2 Privateer

Data from Jane's Fighting Aircraft of World War II, Historic Naval Aircraft & General Dynamics Aircraft

General characteristics

- Crew: 11: two pilots, navigator, bombardier, five gunners, two radio operators
- Length: 74 ft 7 in (22.73 m)
- Wingspan: 110 ft 0 in (33.53 m)
- Height: 30 ft 1 in (9.17 m)
- Wing area: 1,048 sq ft (97.4 m^{2})
- Empty weight: 27,485 lb (12,467 kg)
- Max takeoff weight: 65,000 lb (29,484 kg)
- Fuel capacity: 3,964 US gal (15,010 L; 3,301 imp gal)
- Powerplant: 4 × Pratt & Whitney R-1830-94 radial engines, 1,350 hp (1,010 kW) each

Performance

- Maximum speed: 247 mph (398 km/h, 215 kn) at 14,000 ft (4,300 m)
  238 mph (383 km/h; 207 kn) at sea level
- Cruise speed: 175 mph (282 km/h, 152 kn)
- Range: 2,630 mi (4,230 km, 2,290 nmi) combat range with 2,000 lb (910 kg) bomb load
- Service ceiling: 21,000 ft (6,400 m)
- Wing loading: 62 lb/sq ft (300 kg/m^{2})

Armament

- Guns: 12 × .50 in (12.7 mm) M2 Browning machine guns in six turrets
- Bombs: Up to 8,000 lb (3,600 kg) of bombs, mines, or torpedoes

== See also ==
Related development

- Consolidated B-24 Liberator
- Consolidated B-32 Dominator
- Consolidated C-87 Liberator Express
- Consolidated R2Y

Aircraft of comparable role, configuration, and era

- Avro Shackleton
- Focke-Wulf Fw 200 Condor
- Vickers Warwick
- Nakajima G8N

Related lists

- List of aircraft of World War II
- List of military aircraft of the United States
