= U.S. Forest Service airtanker scandal =

1992 United States political scandal

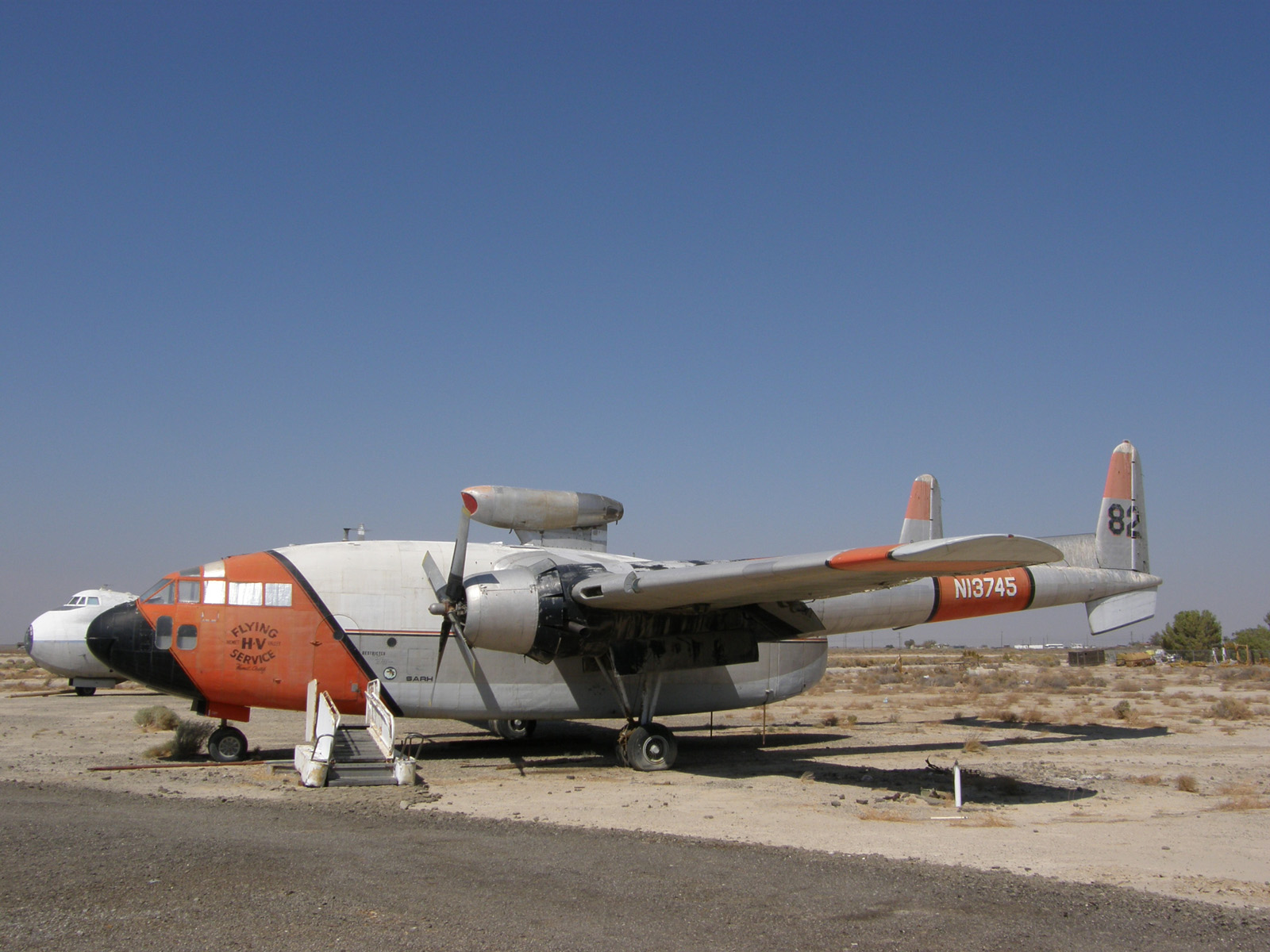
A C-119C which was operated by Hemet Valley Flying Service as Tanker 82 before being retired, now at the Milestones of Flight Museum, Fox Field, Lancaster, California

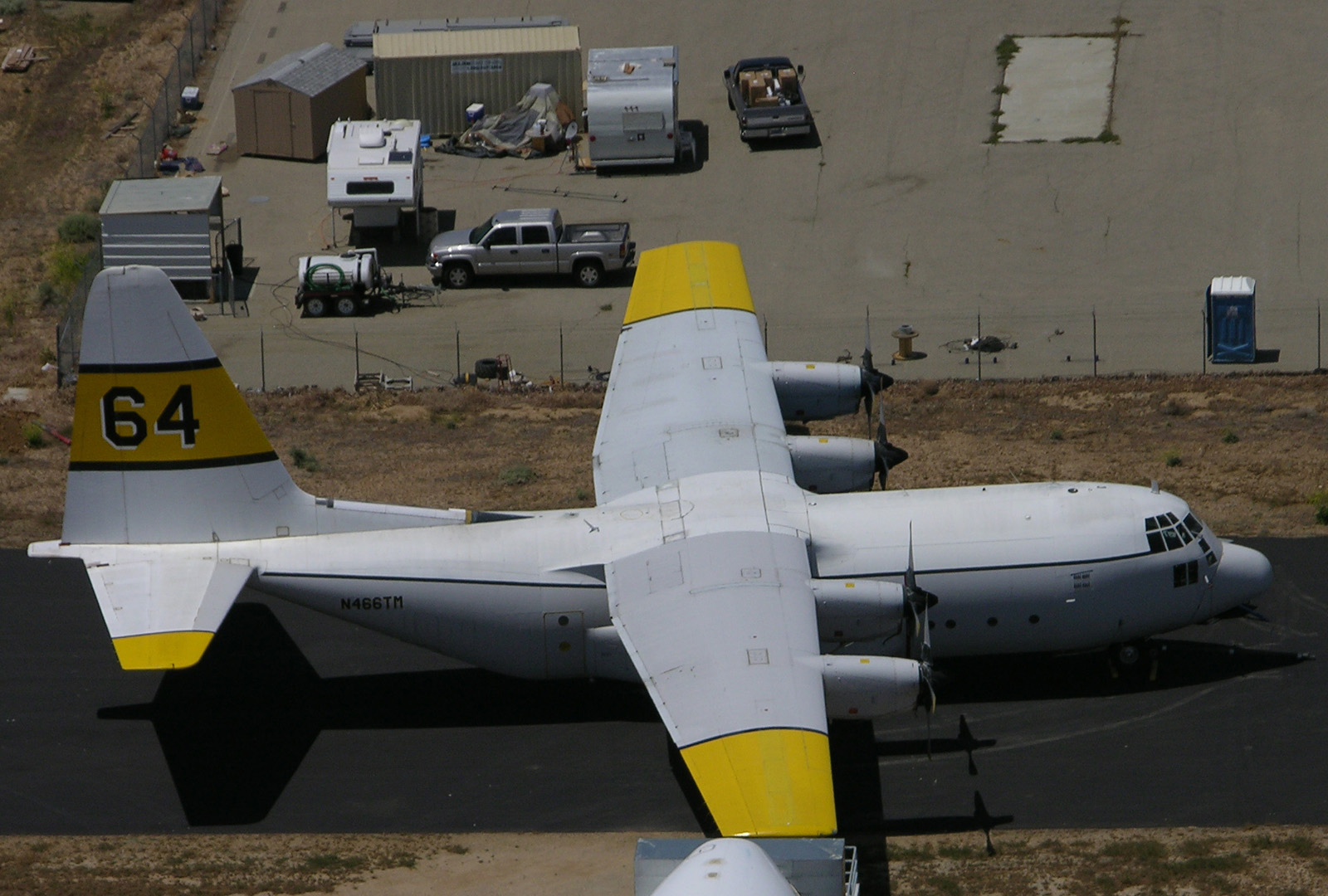
Tanker 64, a C-130A, operated by TBM, Inc. and one of the aircraft involved in the exchange program; it now serves as a flight test aircraft at the Mojave Spaceport.

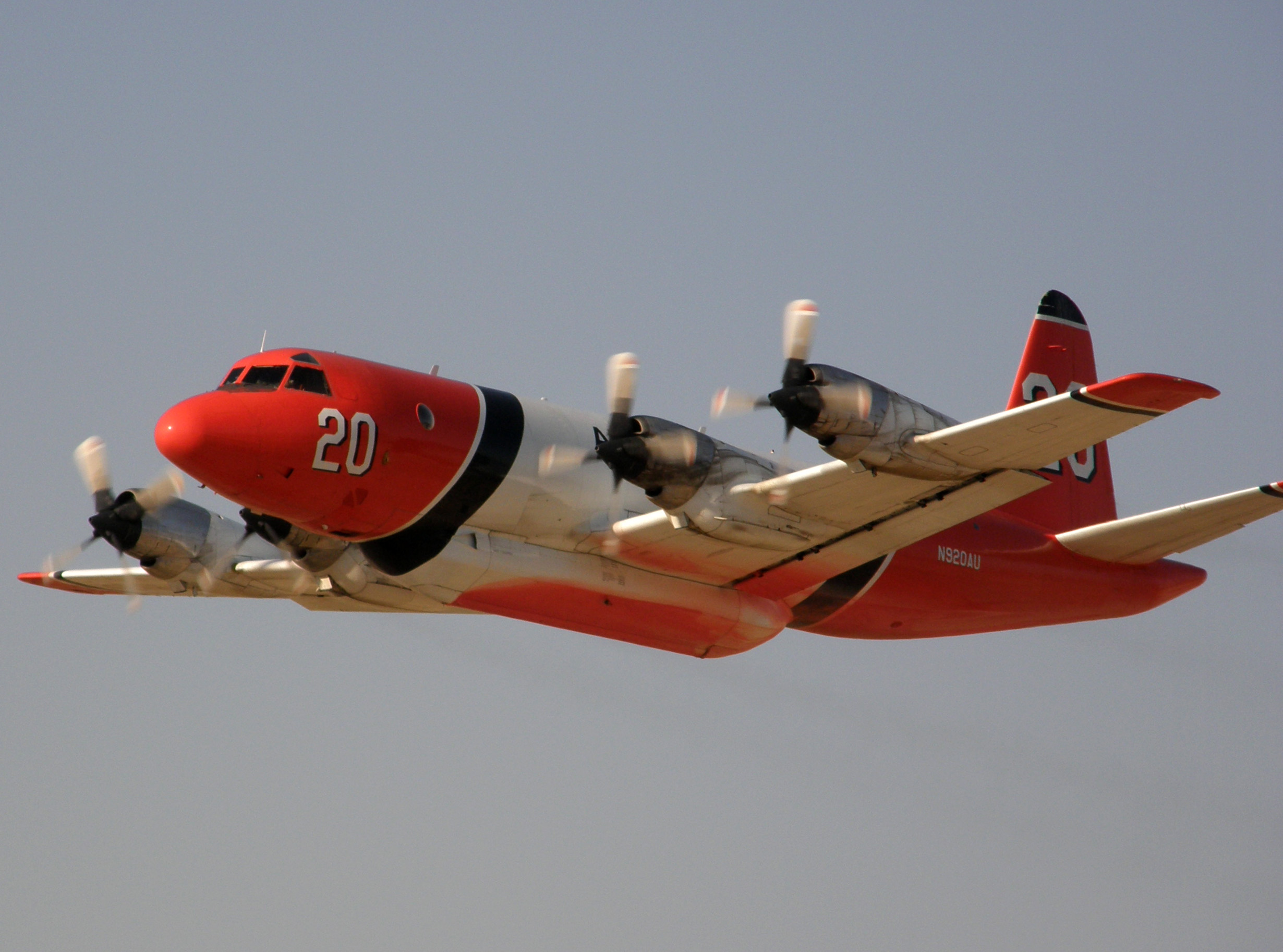
Aero Union P-3A Orion taking off from Fox Field, Lancaster, California

The U.S. Forest Service airtanker scandal involved a scheme, officially called the Historical Aircraft Exchange Program, in which the U.S. Forest Service would acquire retired U.S. Air Force C-130A transport aircraft and U.S. Navy P-3 anti-submarine patrol aircraft, ostensibly for use as firefighting airtankers, but which ended up with the planes' ownership being transferred illegally to private companies and the aircraft themselves being used for other purposes or even sold for a profit. The issue resulted in two of the involved principals being sentenced to prison and a number of civil lawsuits.

The scheme was developed in December 1987 by Fred Fuchs, deputy director of fire and aviation, and the private aircraft broker Roy D. Reagan, a cousin of President Ronald Reagan. Reagan acted as a representative of the Hemet Valley Flying Service. Fuchs was eventually given responsibility for coordinating the exchange program for the Forest Service. He did not discuss the plan with the Forest Service's Office of General Counsel. The letter authorizing the program on behalf of the Forest Service stated that it complied with various provisions of the federal regulations, when it did not. In addition, Fuchs provided bills of sale to the contractors, transferring actual ownership of the planes to the companies, in violation of the applicable regulations, as well as the provisions laid down by the GSA. Further, Fuchs told his USFS superiors that the transfer of ownership had been approved by the GSA, when it had not. In the ensuing criminal trial, three Air Force generals testified that they were not aware that the government would be losing title to the aircraft; if they had, they said, they would not have approved the program.

In 1989, the United States Department of Agriculture (USDA, the parent department of the Forest Service) began to look at the exchange program, which was quietly terminated in January 1990, after the assistant general counsel of the USDA concluded that the USFS did not have authority to conduct the program.In 1992, the OIG determined that the USFS did not have the authority to make the aircraft exchanges. Federal auditors determined that most of the C-130s given to the contractors were not being used for firefighting, and that the C-119s which were traded in were essentially "junk". Between ten and eleven (depending on the source) of the C-130s were never even converted into airtankers. Department of Agriculture Undersecretary Jim Lyons told the Los Angeles Times that some of the agency's actions were "clearly illegal" and "may have been criminal." On March 3, 1994, the Department of Defense's assistant inspector general for criminal investigative policy and oversight asked the Justice Department (DoJ) to investigate the Forest Service and the program. In 1995, GSA auditors determined that the U.S. had lost money on the deal, based on comparisons of aircraft values.After a 1997 trial in U.S. District Court in Tucson, Arizona which lasted five weeks, both of the scheme's main figures were convicted of the conspiracy charge, but were found "not guilty" on the conversion charge. Fuchs was sentenced to 2 years in prison, while Reagan was sentenced to 2½ years, with both also receiving an additional three years of probation. There were no fines levied. The men began serving their sentences on May 4, 1998.

== Background ==
The U.S. Forest Service (USFS) had traditionally relied on contracting with private companies to provide large airtankers for fighting forest fires, the majority of which had been retired World War II and Korean War-era transports, bombers, and maritime patrol aircraft. Such aircraft were relatively inexpensive to obtain and could carry the large loads of fire retardant needed to make their use effective. In the 1980s, the bulk of the airtanker fleet consisted of C-119 Flying Boxcars which had been obtained from the military. After concerns about safety, the aging C-119s were grounded in 1987. Because the available airtanker fleet was substantially diminished, the Forest Service needed to obtain additional aircraft for firefighting operations.

== Exchange scheme ==
In December 1987, the director of fire and aviation management for the USFS instructed Fred Fuchs, deputy director of fire and aviation, to request that the Department of Defense cooperate with civilian contractors in a plan to obtain surplus military transport aircraft stored at Davis-Monthan Air Force Base in Tucson, Arizona, which could be converted to airtankers. Besides replacing the grounded C-119s, this program was intended to modernize the tanker fleet to all-turbine aircraft.

At the time, Roy D. Reagan, cousin of President Ronald Reagan, was a private aircraft broker representing Hemet Valley Flying Service, one of the Forest Service's contractors, and an operator of C-119s. At a meeting on December 23, 1987, attended by both Fuchs and Reagan, the Air Force was presented with the idea of transferring retired U.S. Air Force C-130As to the National Museum of the United States Air Force, which would then exchange the C-130As with Hemet Valley's grounded C-119s, since the latter aircraft could be considered "historic" aircraft. However, at a subsequent meeting with representatives of the Air Force Museum, Air Force officials reacted negatively to the idea of such an exchange.

Fuchs and Reagan then met with representatives of the General Services Administration (GSA) who suggested that the exchanges be conducted without going through the Air Force Museum, and instead have the Forest Service become directly involved. In this version of the plan, the Air Force would declare that the aircraft were "excess property" and transfer them to GSA, who could then legally make the planes available to other government agencies, but with the provision that any agencies receiving them would be required to retain ownership. This plan was agreed upon, and Fuchs was given responsibility for coordinating the exchange program for the Forest Service. He did not, however, discuss the plan with the Forest Service's Office of General Counsel. The letter authorizing the program on behalf of the Forest Service stated that it complied with various provisions of the federal regulations, when in actuality it did not. In addition, Fuchs provided bills of sale to the contractors, transferring actual ownership of the planes to the companies, in violation of the applicable regulations, as well as the provisions laid down by the GSA. Further, Fuchs told his USFS superiors that the transfer of ownership had been approved by the GSA when in fact it had not. In the ensuing criminal trial, three Air Force generals testified that they were not aware that the government would be losing title to the aircraft; if they had, they said, they would not have approved the program.

Initially, four airtanker operators were represented by Reagan and participated in the exchange program: Hemet Valley Flying Service, Aero Union, TBM, Inc., and Hawkins and Powers. Because only a select number of contractors were provided aircraft, and because the program was not publicized nor were the contracts and aircraft put up for bid, accusations of favoritism followed.

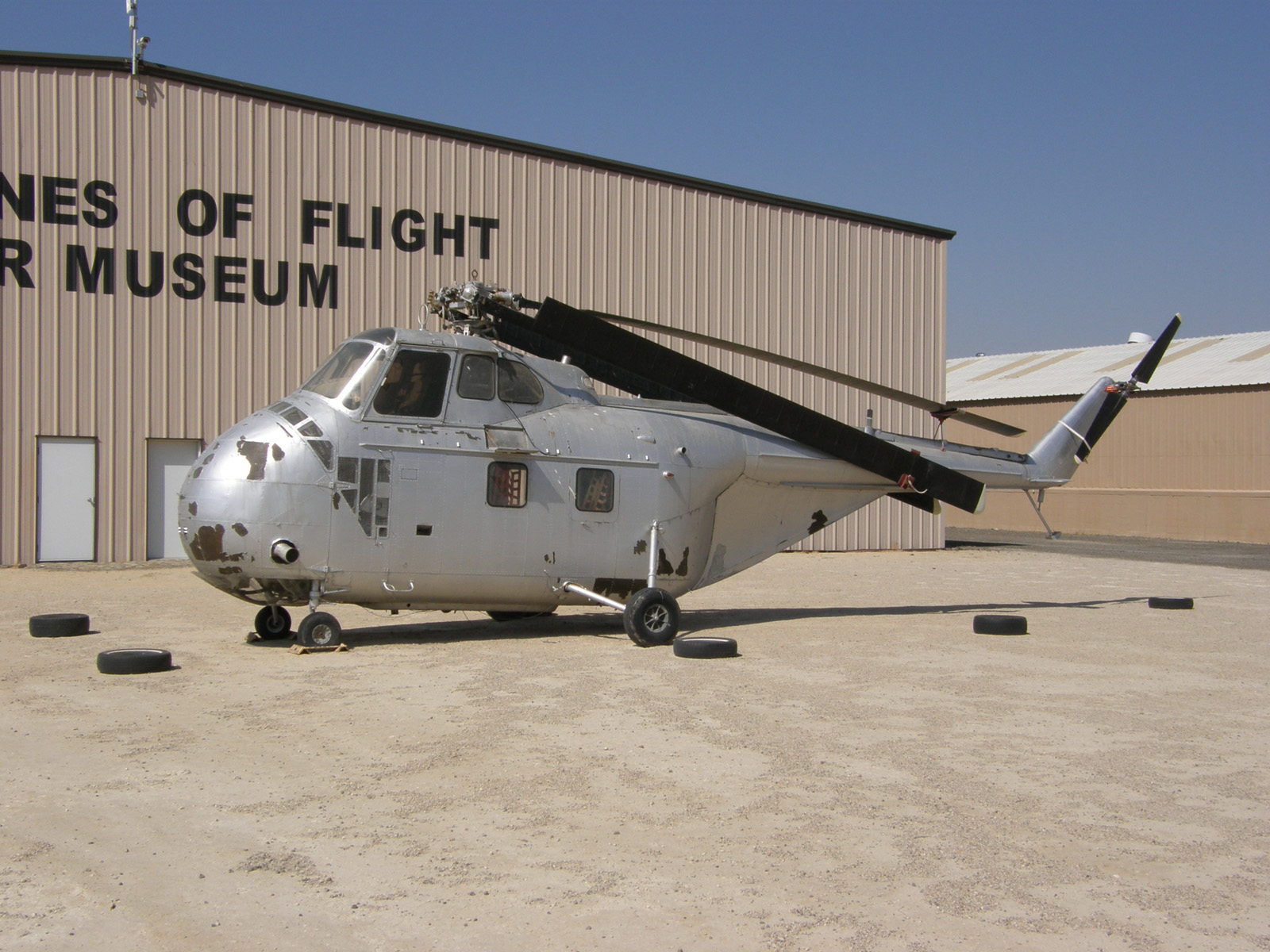
UH-19B at the Milestones of Flight Museum, Fox Field, Lancaster, California. This helicopter had been operated by T&G Aviation under contract to the USFS hauling firefighters and performing bucket water drops. In 1989 it was exchanged for a C-130A.

T&G Aviation of Chandler, Arizona became aware of the program from one of its competitors (T&G was operating eight older Douglas DC-7s at the time). Concerned that this gave its competitors an unfair advantage in obtaining Forest Service firefighting contracts, T&G officials contacted Fuchs, who told them that no more aircraft were available. The company then contacted several congressmen for assistance, and eventually received three C-130s. In exchange, T&G provided a DC-7B to the Pima Air & Space Museum, an SNB-5 to Planes of Fame and a UH-19B to the Milestones of Flight museum at Fox Field.

The aircraft, ultimately 22 C-130As and six P-3s, ended up being distributed to six contractors. Twelve of the C-130s came from the "ready-reserve national air fleet" stored at Davis-Monthan Air Force Base in Tucson, Arizona, and 16 were retired from Air Force Reserve units and delivered to Pinal Airpark in Marana, Arizona, where they were processed out and transferred through the exchange program. As part of the deal, since Reagan acted as broker on behalf of the companies, he was paid a commission by them in the form of ownership of four of the C-130As, which he subsequently sold for personal profit. The contractors paid nothing for the aircraft, but agreed to perform the conversions and install the fire retardant dispersal equipment at their own cost. The operators then had to competitively bid for the contract at a low enough price to be awarded a year-long contract for fire suppression missions.

== Investigations and accusations ==
=== USDA and Forest Service ===
In 1989, the United States Department of Agriculture (USDA, the parent department of the Forest Service) began to look at the exchange program, which was quietly terminated in January 1990, after the assistant general counsel of the USDA concluded that the USFS did not have authority to conduct the program.

In 1993, Forest Service Chief Dale Robertson testified before a House subcommittee, stating, "This has been poorly managed by the Forest Service." Fuchs was demoted in the Forest Service, and retired in 1996.

=== Gary Eitel ===
Gary Eitel, a pilot, aviation consultant, and aircraft broker, found out about the program and contacted the Forest Service in 1991 to try to obtain C-130s for his clients, who had not been in on the initial deal. He was told by the agency that there were no more aircraft available, and that only three planes had been involved. Suspecting that he was not being told the truth, Eitel began his own investigation, obtaining documentation on the program through the Freedom of Information Act. Eitel took on the role of whistleblower, and reported his findings in testimony before several congressional subcommittee hearings.

=== Other federal investigations ===
As a result of Eitel's personal investigations, he filed several "hotline" complaints to the USDA and the Office of the U.S. Inspector General (OIG), leading to the initiation of a number of investigations. In 1992, the OIG determined that the USFS did not have the authority to make the aircraft exchanges.

Federal auditors determined that most of the C-130s given to the contractors were not being used for firefighting, and that the C-119s which were traded in were essentially "junk". Between ten and eleven (depending on the source) of the C-130s were never even converted into airtankers. Department of Agriculture Undersecretary Jim Lyons told the Los Angeles Times that some of the agency's actions were "clearly illegal" and "may have been criminal."

On March 3, 1994, the Department of Defense's assistant inspector general for criminal investigative policy and oversight asked the Justice Department (DoJ) to investigate the Forest Service and the program. In 1995, GSA auditors determined that the U.S. had lost money on the deal, based on comparisons of aircraft values.

Besides these agency investigations, several congressional hearings were held to ferret out the facts of the convoluted program. According to one newspaper, there were "nine years of investigations involving more than a half-dozen federal agencies, at least three congressional inquiries, work by more than two dozen attorneys generating millions of dollars in fees and at least 12 state and federal trials."

=== Values ===
Numerous accusations have related to the value of both the vintage airtankers that were being retired, and that of the surplus military aircraft being provided to the contractors. According to an investigation by the Los Angeles Times, some of the planes being traded in were of no historical significance and, due to their age, were only worth scrap value, as little as $10,000 per aircraft. The Forest Service contends, though, that 28 of the trade-ins ended up in museums across the country.

On the other side of the deal, the surplus aircraft were also valued at scrap prices by the Forest Service for the purposes of the exchange, as little as $15,000 each. The Forest Service later put the value of each plane at between $750,000 and $1.5 million. The Inspector General, however, reported in 1992 that the aircraft were actually worth about $2.4 million each, with a resulting price tag of $67 million for the aircraft which were given to the contractors. The Forest Service has argued that if the aircraft had been actually sold to contractors for their full value, the U.S. tax payers ultimately would have footed the bill in terms of higher airtanker contract costs. The contractors paid for the costs of the conversions, about $500,000 per aircraft, and once they received the planes, they found that the program did not have provisions for providing spare parts to keep the fleet flying, and some of the surplus transports had costly turbine engines which had reached their life limits, and were therefore worthless and had to be replaced.

=== Firefighting deficiencies ===
One aspect which several investigations brought to the fore was the impact on firefighting efforts. An investigation into the July 1994 South Canyon fire in Colorado, which killed 14 firefighters, concluded that "Air support was inadequate for implementing strategies and tactics." Eitel has alleged that the reason for inadequate air support was that the aircraft from the exchange program which should have been available to fire managers were instead doing non-fire related work, some of it secret, around the world.

=== Grand jury ===
As a result of the DoJ investigation, six years after the termination of the exchange program by the USDA, a grand jury indicted Fuchs and Reagan, charging each with one count of conspiracy and one count of converting U.S. property to the use of another. Besides the actual counts the two were charged with, the grand jury specified ten illegal or improper "overt acts" that the two defendants committed, including:

- Misrepresenting Reagan's employment status (implying he was a representative of the Forest Service) to both the U.S. Air Force and the Navy
- Misrepresenting the manner in which the government-owned aircraft were going to be provided to the private operators
- Fuchs received flight time and a resulting upgrade to his personal pilot's license in the aircraft being exchanged
- Fuchs altered one of the exchange agreements, adding the serial numbers of aircraft already delivered.

=== Congressional solution ===
In 1996, Congress passed the Wildfire Suppression Aircraft Act, which gave the DoD authority to sell excess military aircraft to airtanker contractors.

== Criminal cases ==
After a trial in U.S. District Court in Tucson, Arizona which lasted five weeks, both were convicted in 1997 of the conspiracy charge, but were found "not guilty" on the conversion charge. Fuchs was sentenced to 2 years in prison, while Reagan was sentenced to 2½ years, with both also receiving an additional three years of probation. There were no fines levied. The men began serving their sentences on May 4, 1998.

The two appealed their sentences, although, in an unusual move for such a case, their prison sentences were not stayed pending appeal. In July, 2000, the U.S. 9th Circuit Court of Appeals, in a 2-to-1 decision, overturned the convictions on the grounds that the original trial jury was improperly instructed regarding the possible implications of the statute of limitations on some of the conspiracy-related activities. With the reversal, the two defendants were released from prison, after serving 20 months. Federal prosecutors elected not to retry the two.

== Civil cases ==
=== Repossession suits ===
Eventually, a Forest Service contracting officer determined that the exchanges had been illegal, and on December 1, 1998, the Forest Service asserted ownership of the aircraft and ruled that the aircraft must be returned. "The original exchange agreements for the transfer of aircraft are void because we didn't have the authority to conduct an exchange. I have been working to resolve concerns about the air tanker program raised in the OIG audit and issued the letter asserting aircraft ownership on behalf of the Agency," stated Ron Hooper, staff assistant to the Forest Service Deputy Chief for Business Operations, the contracting officer who made the determination of ownership, and who would later testify to that effect in court. In letters sent to the operators, the Forest Service also said that they were prepared to return the titles of the historical aircraft then in museums, many of which were no longer flyable. The airtanker operators sued and eventually prevailed against this ruling. The assertion of ownership ruling allowed for continued operation of eleven of the aircraft which were scheduled to be used under the 1999 National Air Tanker Contract (five other operable aircraft were in the possession of companies who either were unsuccessful in their bid for the contract, or simply chose not to bid; the aircraft, the USFS stated, must still be maintained and used only for firefighting purposes).

In response, several of the companies filed suit to prevent this. Years of legal wrangling ensued, until March, 2007 when the matter finally went to trial in the U.S. Court of Federal Claims, which ruled for International Air Response, the successor to T&G Aviation. The government had required the return of the three C-130As provided to T&G or a payment of US$2.4 million plus interest, and the court invalidated this request based on existing law (40 USC 544) which states that if a Bill of Sale is provided, that is evidence that the transaction meets all regulatory requirements. In thus ruling, the court determined that despite the transactions being illegal from the Forest Service's perspective, the purchasers could not be held liable for the agency's improper activities.

Similarly, Pacific Harbor Capital received a summary judgment regarding ownership of two of the C-130As, since bills of sale that could be traced back to those issued by Fuchs had been executed. Even though it was illegal for the USFS to issue such bills, the court ruled that such action did not nullify good-faith purchases on the part of the contractors.

=== Eitel qui tam ===
In 1994, Gary Eitel filed a qui tam civil lawsuit on behalf of the Federal government against Reagan, the six airtanker operators, and a number of other defendants, which alleged fraud and the unjust gain of enrichment through the exchange program. Due to federal law, Fuchs is immune from being named in such a civil suit. Initially, the U.S. government declined to join the suit. In a qui tam suit, a private citizen may file suit on behalf of and as an agent for the U.S. Government against entities accused of defrauding the government. While the plaintiff must pay for the legal expenses out of his own pocket (in 1998 Eitel estimated that the suit had cost him $3 million), he is entitled to receive 15% to 30% of the money which the government recovers should he prevail in court. Potential penalties were estimated to run as high as US$500 million. Among the issues raised in court by the suit are "whether some aerial firefighters were unjustly enriched, if the U.S. Justice Department and Forest Service covered up CIA and drug cartel links to some of the planes, whether the planes should remain in private hands, if the list of defendants should grow or dwindle, and who is telling the truth."

The suit was originally filed in U.S. District Court in Oregon (because that was where Reagan was living at the time), and that court ended up dismissing the action. Eitel appealed to the 9th Circuit Court of Appeals, which, in 1997, reinstated the case and allowed the Justice Department to join Eitel as a plaintiff in the suit. At this time, the case was also transferred to District Court in Arizona. Eitel and the Justice Department, however, disagreed over the allegations of CIA involvement, and whether that should be a factor in the suit. The DoJ filed motions in 1998 to drop several of the defendants, provoking a sharp disagreement between Eitel and the department, and resulting in Eitel's accusation that the DoJ was covering up covert activities and evidence.

One of the defendants named in the suit was Riverside County, California County Supervisor Jim Venable, who was also the president of the original recipient, Hemet Valley Flying Service, which received seven of the C-130s.

Eitel filed a separate civil suit, which was later combined into his whistleblower action, against the DoJ, USDA and the GSA for an out-of-court settlement between the government and Aero Union and TBM. These two contractors had received aircraft which the government had retained title of, and instead of maintaining the planes, they dismantled them for parts, netting $750,000 in proceeds.

== Aircraft disposition ==
In the original intent of the exchange program, the C-130s were supposed to stay under U.S. agency control, and were supposed to only be used by the contractors for firefighting purposes within U.S borders. However, not only were the titles of the aircraft transferred out of federal and into private control, but the aircraft were used for a lot more than firefighting. Some of the aircraft were simply sold on the open market (with one being sold to a South African fish-hauling operation), others underwent convoluted title transfers that masked their ownership, and Federal auditors found that a number of the C-130s had been dismantled and their parts sold on the open market. Reagan received title to four of the aircraft as his "commission", which he then sold for $1.1 million. During the criminal case, both trial and appellate, it was noted that proceeds from these sales were not declared by Reagan on his income taxes, which the court stated as being evidence that he knew the transactions were illegal.

Two of the aircraft, operated by T&G, were found to be hauling cargo in Kuwait at the end of the Gulf War. This discovery played a big part in prompting some of the investigations, and resulted in the Forest Service and the FAA insisting that the planes be returned to the U.S.

=== Exchanged aircraft ===
Some of the older aircraft that initiated the replacement scandal are now in museums; a DC-7B to the Pima Air & Space Museum in Tucson, Arizona, an SNB-5 to the Planes of Fame museum, and a UH-19B and C-119C to the Milestones of Flight museum at Fox Field.

=== Drug trafficking seizure ===
There have been at least two drug trafficking incidents involving C-130s from T&G Aviation, one of the original five contractors in the exchange program. In 1990 - 1991, T&G leased a C-130A to the Panamanian airline Trans Latin Air, which was indicted in 1994 in a Chicago federal court as one of the aviation companies used by the Cali Cartel of Colombia. Luis Carlos Herrera Lizcano, a Colombian aviation executive that was involved with Trans Latin Air, was sentenced in 1995 to five years in a Florida federal prison. The C-130A, and one other were then sold by T&G in 1993 to Aero Postal de Mexico for US$3.6 million.

In October 1997, one of those two aircraft was again in the spotlight when Mexican federal officials seized it as a drug hauler. Mexican investigators had linked Aero Postal de Mexico's owner, Jesus Villegas Covallos, to Ramón Arellano Félix of the Tijuana Cartel. Because of the size and visibility of the C-130, officials doubted that the aircraft was used to bring drugs into the U.S., but was ideal for transporting the contraband "either within the interior of Mexico or from South or Central America."

T&G subsequently filed for bankruptcy, and its assets were taken over by International Air Response.

=== CIA-use allegations ===
The alleged covert use of some of the C-130s by operators under contract with the CIA received considerable media attention. The source of the CIA allegation was whistleblower Gary Eitel, who began to suspect "criminal wrongdoing" and that he had "inadvertently stepped into a covert CIA operation" during his investigation. He came to believe that the exchange program, in part, was a way to funnel military aircraft into the hands of private companies who contracted their services to the CIA, using the Forest Service as an innocuous middle-man for the transfer.

After his investigation, Assistant Inspector General James Ebbitt testified that he found no evidence of CIA involvement in the program. Congressman Charles Rose, after hearing Eitel's testimony, went on record saying that he was suspicious, stating, "This situation stinks to high heaven." Both the CIA and the Forest Service have vehemently denied CIA involvement in the exchange program. Ultimately, all of the CIA allegations link back to Eitel's claims, and other than his persistent testimony in hearings and later in court, no evidence has been produced corroborating a CIA link to the aircraft. The Justice Department has also denied any link, with Assistant U.S. Attorney Claire Lefkowitz on record as stating "We've never found any evidence of CIA involvement."

Reagan attempted to use a CIA connection to motion for a new trial, alleging that one of the prosecution witnesses was a CIA operative who himself was under a criminal investigation. In rejecting the motion, U.S. District Judge William Browning stated, "The allegation that the CIA was involved is at best illusory. While it is titillating, it's not brought out by any evidence on the record."

=== Crashes and fleet grounding ===
Three of the C-130s ended up crashing, two in California (1994 and 2002) when their wings separated in flight due to structural failure, and one in France in 2000 striking a bridge. The France crash involved one of T&G's C-130s. As a direct result of these accidents, in 2004 the entire fleet of C-130A airtankers was permanently grounded by the Forest Service due to safety concerns. The P-3As, all of which were operated by Aero Union, were also initially grounded, but were later returned to the air after it was determined that they could be operated safely, and they remained in service until they were grounded in 2011.

== See also ==
- Aerial firefighting
- Wildland fire suppression
- Wildfire
