= Victor Plantevin =

French politician

Victor Plantevin (7 September 1900 – 18 December 1983) was a French politician.

Plantevin was born in Burzet. He represented the National Centre of Independents and Peasants (CNIP) in the National Assembly from 1951 to 1958.
