= 2002 United States airtanker crashes =

Fatal aviation accidents in California and Colorado

2002 Walker C-130A crash
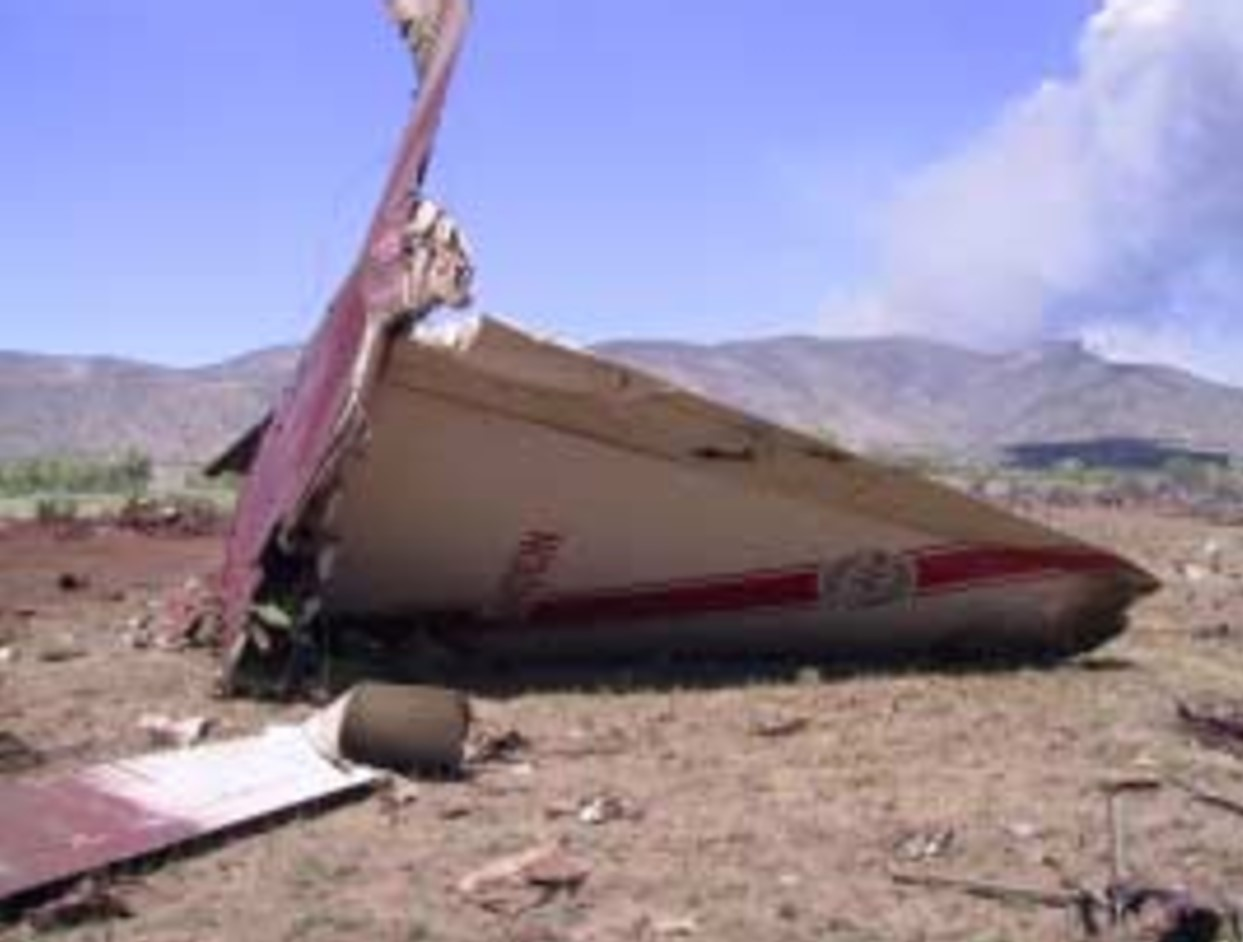
- The tail section of Tanker 130 at the crash site

Accident
- Date: June 17, 2002
- Summary: Structural failure, wing detachment
- Site: near Walker, California

Aircraft
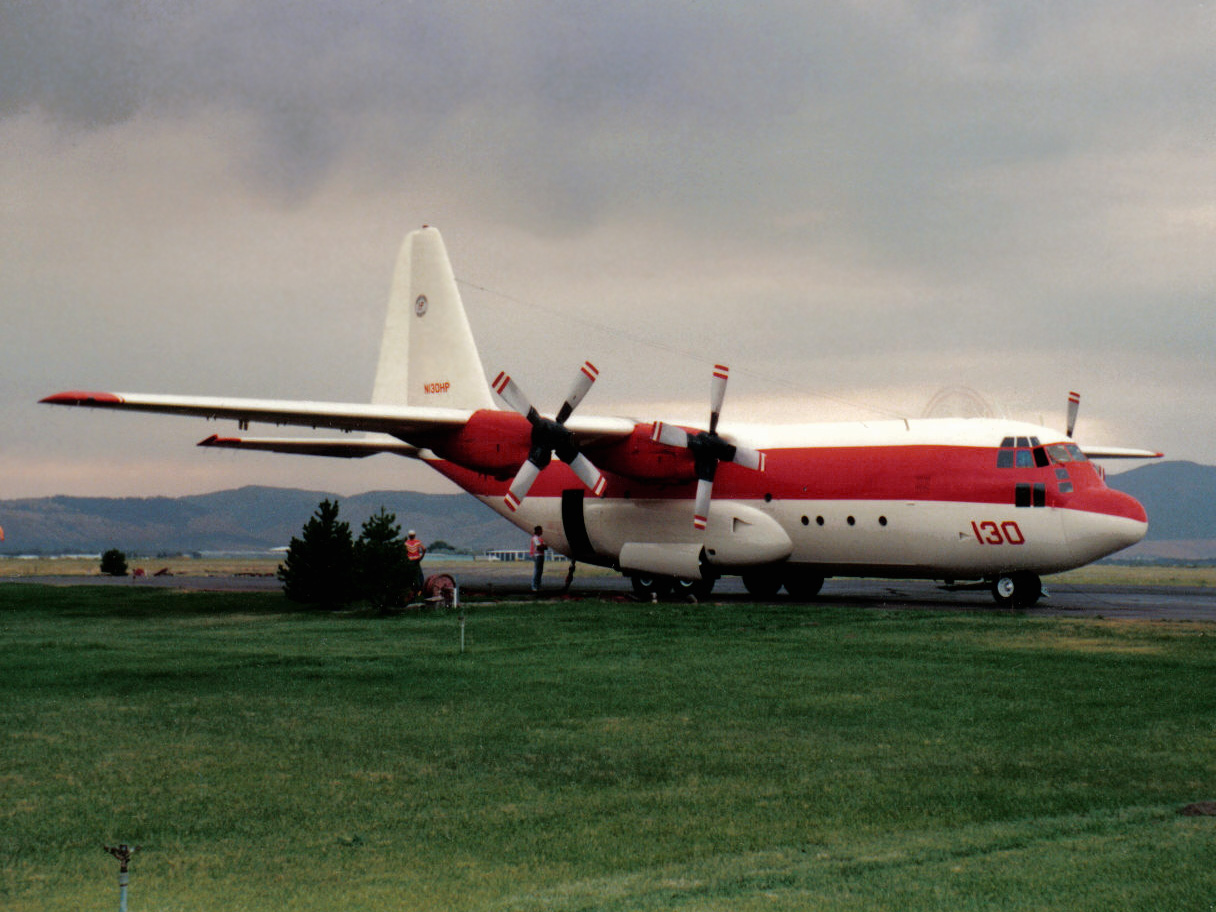
- C-130A Tanker 130 owned by Hawkins & Powers of Greybull, WY. as seen circa early 2002 at Union Co. Airport, La Grande, Oregon
- Aircraft type: Lockheed C-130A Hercules
- Operator: Hawkins & Powers Aviation
- Registration: N130HP
- Flight origin: Minden–Tahoe Airport, Nevada, United States
- Destination: Minden–Tahoe Airport, Nevada, United States
- Occupants: 3
- Crew: 3
- Fatalities: 3
- Survivors: 0

2002 Estes Park PB4Y-2 crash
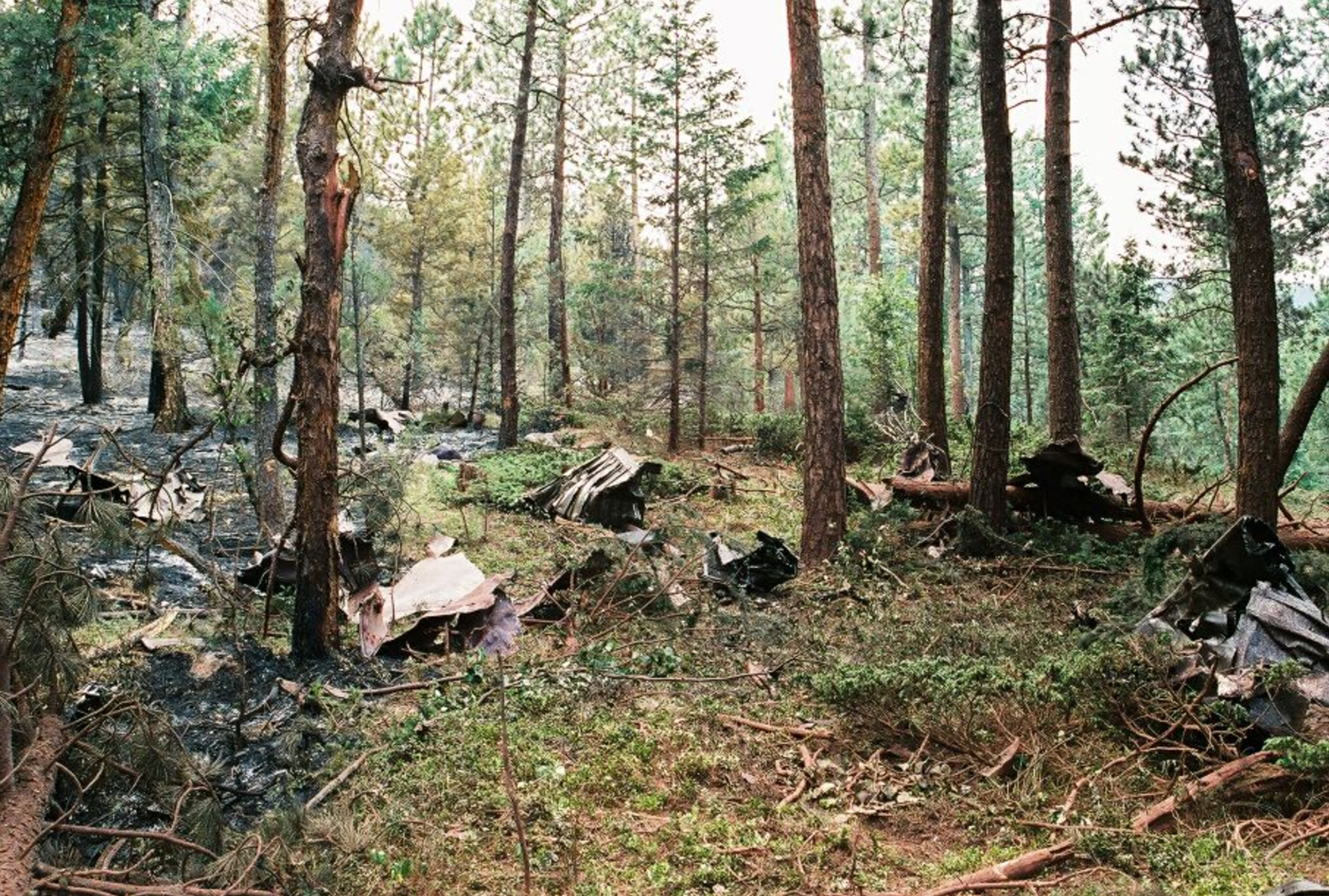
- The main wreckage of Tanker 123 at the crash site

Accident
- Date: July 18, 2002
- Summary: Structural failure, wing detachment
- Site: near Estes Park, Colorado

Aircraft
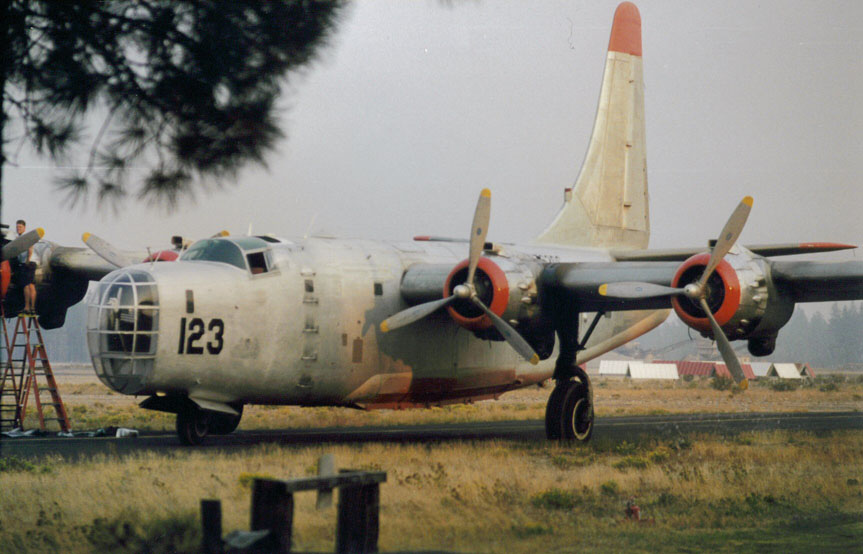
- P4Y-2 Tanker 123, at Chester Air Attack Base in the late 1990s
- Aircraft type: Consolidated PB4Y-2 Super Privateer
- Operator: Hawkins & Powers Aviation
- Registration: N7620C
- Flight origin: Jeffco Airport, Colorado, United States
- Destination: Jeffco Airport, Colorado, United States
- Occupants: 2
- Crew: 2
- Fatalities: 2
- Survivors: 0

In June and July 2002, two large airtankers – a Lockheed C-130 Hercules and a Consolidated PB4Y-2 Privateer – crashed about a month apart while performing aerial firefighting operations. These crashes prompted a review of the maintenance and use of the entire U.S. large airtanker fleet. Ultimately, the whole fleet (33 aircraft in all) was grounded, dramatically reducing the resources available to fight major wildfires. Both aircraft were owned by Hawkins & Powers Aviation of Greybull, Wyoming and operated under contract to the United States Forest Service (USFS). The crashes occurred in one of the worst fire seasons in the last half century, one in which 73,000 fires burned 7.2 million acres (29,000 km^{2}) of land.

== C-130A, Walker, California ==
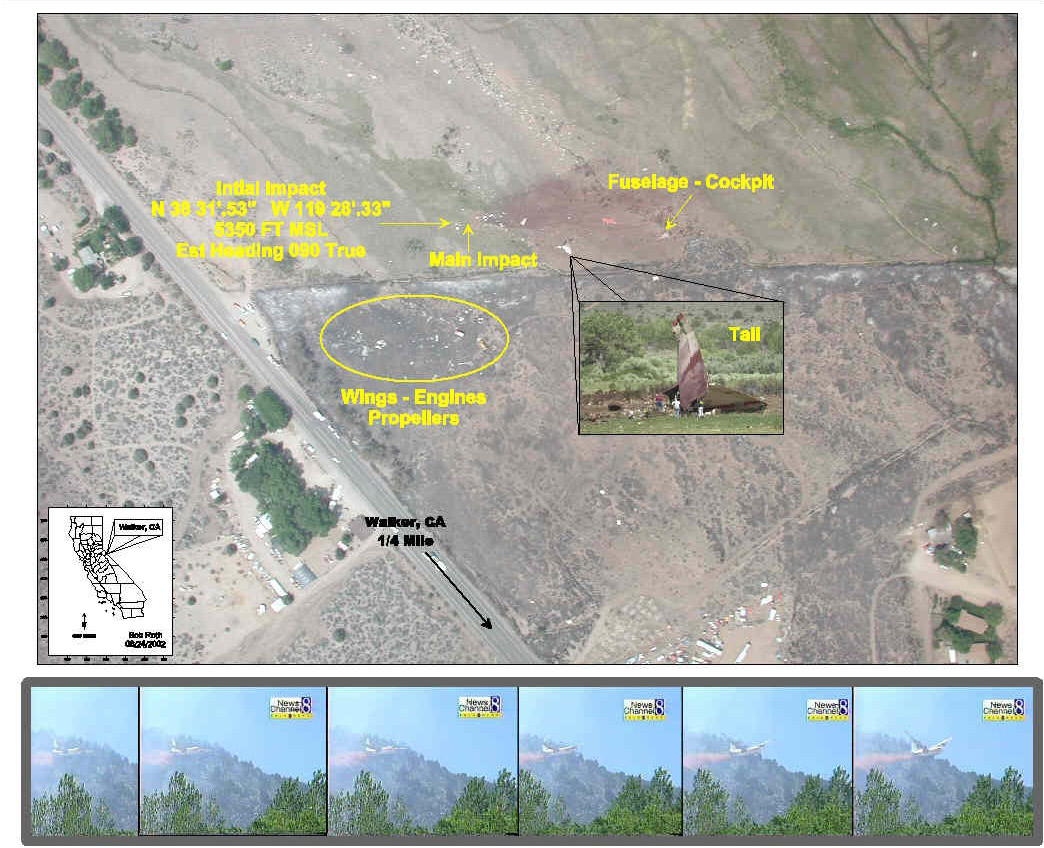
N130HP crash scene from NTSB report

Lockheed C-130A Hercules registration N130HP, call sign Tanker 130, was flying against the Cannon Fire, near Walker, California on June 17, 2002, when it experienced structural failure of the center wing section, causing both wings to fold upward and separate from the aircraft. The fuselage rolled and crashed inverted, killing the three crewmen on board. Unusually, the aircraft was being filmed by a passing tourist during the retardant drop and at the moment the wings separated, providing valuable video evidence for the subsequent investigation by the National Transportation Safety Board (NTSB).

Tanker 130 had departed the Minden, Nevada air attack base at 2:29 p.m. PDT loaded with 3,000 US gallons (11,000 L; 2,500 imp gal) of fire retardant for its sixth drop of the day with a pilot, copilot and flight engineer on board, and arrived at the fire at 2:45 p.m. The aircraft made an initial spotting pass over the drop zone, then flew back for the drop, which was to dispense half of the load of retardant. The drop run required the aircraft to make a perpendicular crossing of a ridgeline and then descend into a valley. A video of the accident shows the aircraft crossing the ridge and then pitching down to begin its drop of the retardant. Near the end of the drop, the nose of the aircraft began to pitch up to level attitude as the descent was arrested. The nose continued to pitch up past level attitude, and at the end of the drop, the right wing began to fold upwards, followed less than one second later by the left wing. Two debris fields were found, one 500 feet (150 m) in length and the other 720 feet (220 m) in length. A post-impact fire in the first debris field consumed major portions of the wing and engine components; there was no fire in the second debris field, which included the fuselage and empennage.

The aircraft, previously United States Air Force (USAF) Serial Number 56-0538, was one of the original C-130A production series and had been built and delivered to the USAF in 1957. It was retired from military service in 1986. In May 1988, the aircraft was acquired from the General Services Administration by the USFS, which in August that year sold it and five other C-130s it had acquired to Hemet Valley Flying Service, for conversion to an airtanker. Hemet then sold the C-130 to Hawkins & Powers. At the time of the crash, the aircraft had logged 21,863 flight hours.

The NTSB investigated the crash and determined that the accident was caused by a structural failure that occurred at the wing-to-fuselage attach point, with the right wing failing just before the left. The investigation disclosed "evidence of fatigue cracks in the right wing's lower surface skin panel, with origins beneath the forward doubler. The origin points were determined to be in rivet holes which join the external doubler and the internal stringers to the lower skin panel. These cracks, which grew together to about a 12-inch (30 cm) length, were found to have propagated past the area where they would have been covered by the doubler and into the stringers beneath the doubler and across the lap joint between the middle skin panel and the forward skin panel."

== PB4Y-2, Estes Park, Colorado ==
The second crash occurred on July 18, 2002 near Estes Park, Colorado, also as a result of structural failure, in this case in the wing's spar adjacent to the left side of the fuselage. The aircraft, operating with the callsign Tanker 123, was loaded with 2,000 US gallons (7,600 L; 1,700 imp gal) of retardant. At the time of the accident, it was in a left turn to line up for its eighth drop of the day on the Big Elk Fire. While still in the 15–20° left bank, witnesses on the ground and in another tanker observed the left wing separate from the aircraft and "fold upwards", followed almost immediately by the initiation of a fire. The aircraft continued to roll left, impacting the ground at a 45° nose down attitude, starting a large fire at the wreck site. Both crewmen were killed in the crash.

The aircraft, a Consolidated PB4Y-2 Privateer registered N7620C, was built during World War II. It had been delivered in July 1945 to the United States Navy, which used it for coastal patrol duties. In 1952, it was transferred to the United States Coast Guard, which operated it until it was retired in 1956. The aircraft was removed from storage and converted to an airtanker in 1958, then was flown by several different companies, the last being Hawkins & Powers. At the time of the crash, the airframe had logged 8,346.3 flight hours.

A detailed investigation by the NTSB showed that the wing's lower spar cap had extensive stress fatigue and had fractures through the lower spar cap, vertically up the spar web and into the upper spar cap. The lower wing skin also found signs of fatigue in the area adjacent to the cracked spar cap. An examination of two other similar aircraft showed that the area of cracking was hidden from view by other fuselage structure.

== Prior safety concerns and incidents ==
Concerns about the safety of older transport aircraft being used as airtankers had been ongoing, long before the 2002 crashes. In the early 1980s, concern about the age and safety issues of World War II and Korean War-era aircraft that were the predominant aircraft used as airtankers led the Forest Service to initiate a program to provide more modern, turbine-powered C-130As to contracting companies. However, this solution quickly became the problem. According to an NTSB advisory,

During a C-130A contract pre-award evaluation in 1991, the Department of the Interior's (DOI) Office of Aviation Services inspectors concluded that essential inspection and maintenance services critical to sustaining the airplane in an airworthy condition under normal operating conditions were not being accomplished with the C-130A. This prompted the DOI, in 1993, to prohibit the use of the C130A on DOI land. The FAA and the DOI subsequently developed an action plan to address many of the same inspection and maintenance issues seen in the most recent C-130A and P4Y accident investigations. Since that time the DOI has dropped its restrictions on the C-130A....

On August 13, 1994, a 1957-built C-130A, registration N135FF with call sign Tanker 82, crashed near Pearblossom, California while responding to a forest fire near the Tehachapi Mountains. Eyewitnesses reported seeing an explosion followed by the separation of the right wing at the wing attach point. Due to the extremely rugged terrain, the NTSB recovered only a small portion of the wreckage, and its preliminary conclusion that an explosion caused by a fuel leak led to the wing separation was based largely on eyewitness statements. A subsequent independent investigation in 1997 led by Douglas Herlihy, a former NTSB investigator, reexamined the site and the wreckage, and found no evidence of an explosion, but rather found evidence of structural failure due to fatigue stress. The NTSB subsequently reexamined its findings, and found evidence of fatigue cracking "consistent with overstress separation", and ultimately revised its findings. The initial eyewitness reports of an explosion are not inconsistent with a fatigue-caused wing separation. Similar eyewitness reports were given in the 2002 crash, and an analysis of a video of that crash showed the initiation of a fireball 0.9 seconds after the wing separated.

On September 6, 2000, a 1957-built C-130A registered N116TG, operated by T&G Aviation, fighting a fire near Burzet, France, crashed, killing two of the four crewmen on board. It struck a ridge while preparing for a second drop on the fire.

== Fleet grounding ==
Following the two crashes, the USFS and the United States Bureau of Land Management (BLM) jointly established an independent blue ribbon panel "to investigate issues associated with aerial wildland firefighting in the United States." In March, 2003, the panel released its report, which included eight key findings

...critical for planning a safe and effective fire aviation program. The Report identified various concerns about aircraft safety, including the airworthiness of aircraft that were operating outside of their original intended design and the appropriate levels of maintenance and training to ensure safe operations. The report also identified a lack of training in contemporary aviation management areas that has contributed to an unacceptable accident rate.

As a result of the panel's recommendations, the USFS and BLM declined to renew the leases on nine C-130A and PB4Y-2 airtankers, and ordered the 33 remaining large airtankers to undergo an improved inspection program before they returned to active service. The agencies contracted with the Sandia National Laboratories to analyze the safety of continuing use of five types of airtankers – the Douglas DC-4, Douglas DC-6, Douglas DC-7, Lockheed P-3 Orion and Lockheed P-2 Neptune. In addition, 11 of 19 Beechcraft 58P Baron leadplanes were also retired, as they had exceeded the 6,000 flight hour airframe safety limit. To further reduce the risk to the fleet, the agencies directed their field managers to use airtankers primarily for initial attack only.

Almost two years after the summer 2002 crashes, and as a direct result of the ensuing investigations, on May 10, 2004 the Forest Service abruptly terminated the contracts for the entire large tanker fleet. USFS Chief Dale Bosworth stated, "Safety is a core value of the firefighting community, and it is non-negotiable. To continue to use these contract large airtankers when no mechanism exists to guarantee their airworthiness presents an unacceptable level of risk to the aviators, the firefighters on the ground and the communities we serve." The decision affected tanker contracts issued by both the USFS and BLM.

In the vacuum left by the absence of the large tankers, the Forest Service said it would shift its firefighting strategies to rely more on heavy helicopters, light tankers and military C-130s equipped with the Modular Airborne FireFighting System.

== See also ==
- List of accidents and incidents involving the Lockheed C-130 Hercules
- Wildfire suppression
- Aeroflot Flight 1491 – Another aircraft accident in which both wings separated in flight.
