= Consolidated R2Y =

1940s American prototype military airliner

R2Y Liberator Liner
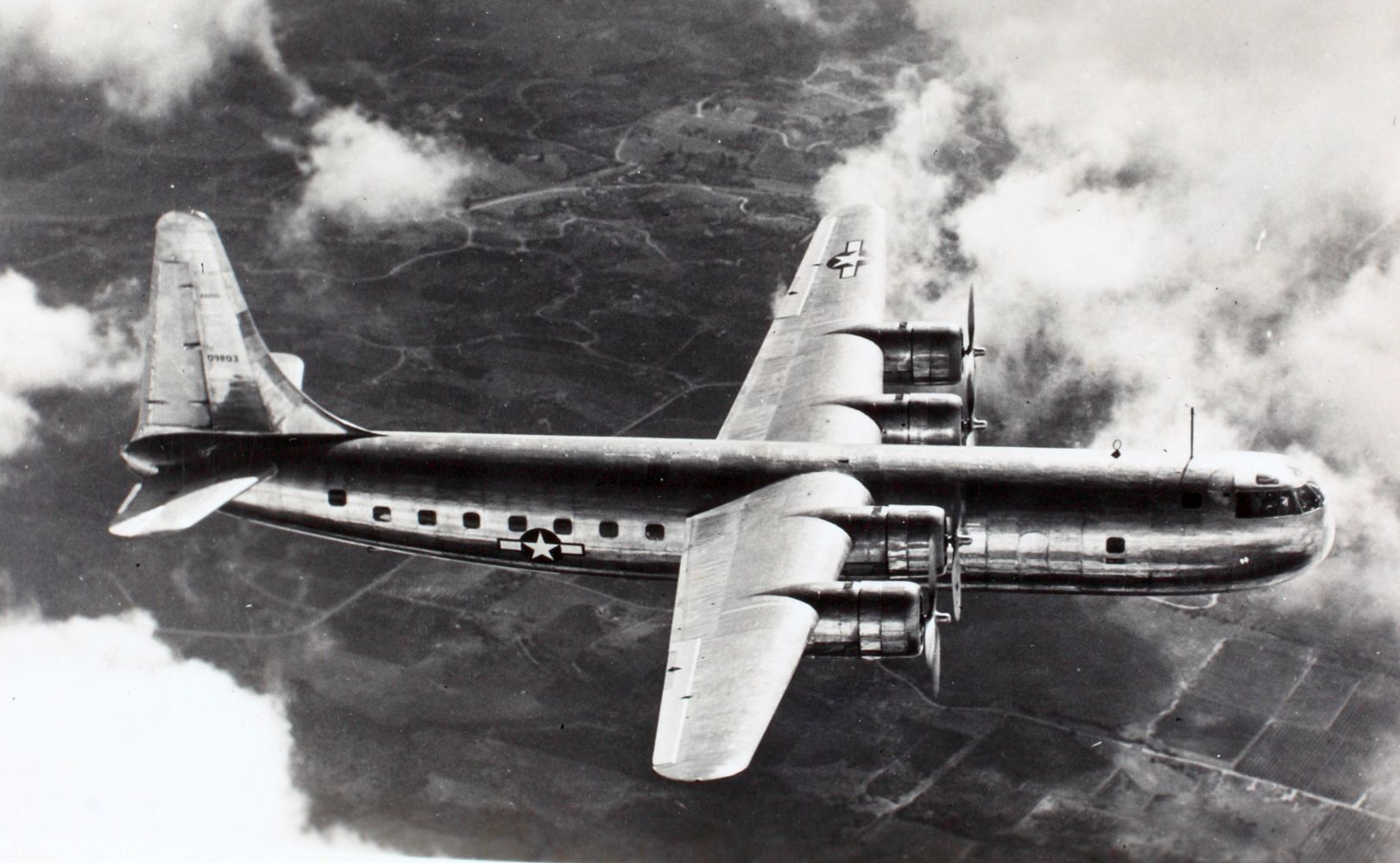
- A Consolidated R2Y-1 in Navy markings.

General information
- Type: Prototype military transport aircraft and Prototype cargo aircraft
- Manufacturer: Consolidated Aircraft
- Status: Experimental
- Primary users: United States Navy American Airlines
- Number built: 1

History
- First flight: 15 April 1944
- Developed from: Consolidated B-24 Liberator

The Consolidated R2Y "Liberator Liner" (Consolidated Model 39) was an airliner derivative of the B-24 Liberator built for the United States Navy by Consolidated Aircraft.

== Development and service ==
The XR2Y-1, as the single prototype was known in Navy service, used the high-aspect wing and tricycle landing gear of the Liberator. The fuselage was an entirely new design, and the vertical stabilizer was taken from the PB4Y Privateer. The final design looked much like a smaller, high-wing Boeing B-29 Superfortress, but with windows for passengers.

The aircraft was meant to carry passengers or cargo to distant Navy bases, but after a brief evaluation the prototype was demilitarized in the mid-1940s, returned to Convair, and leased to American Airlines as a freighter with the name "City of Salinas".

== Specifications (R2Y-1) ==
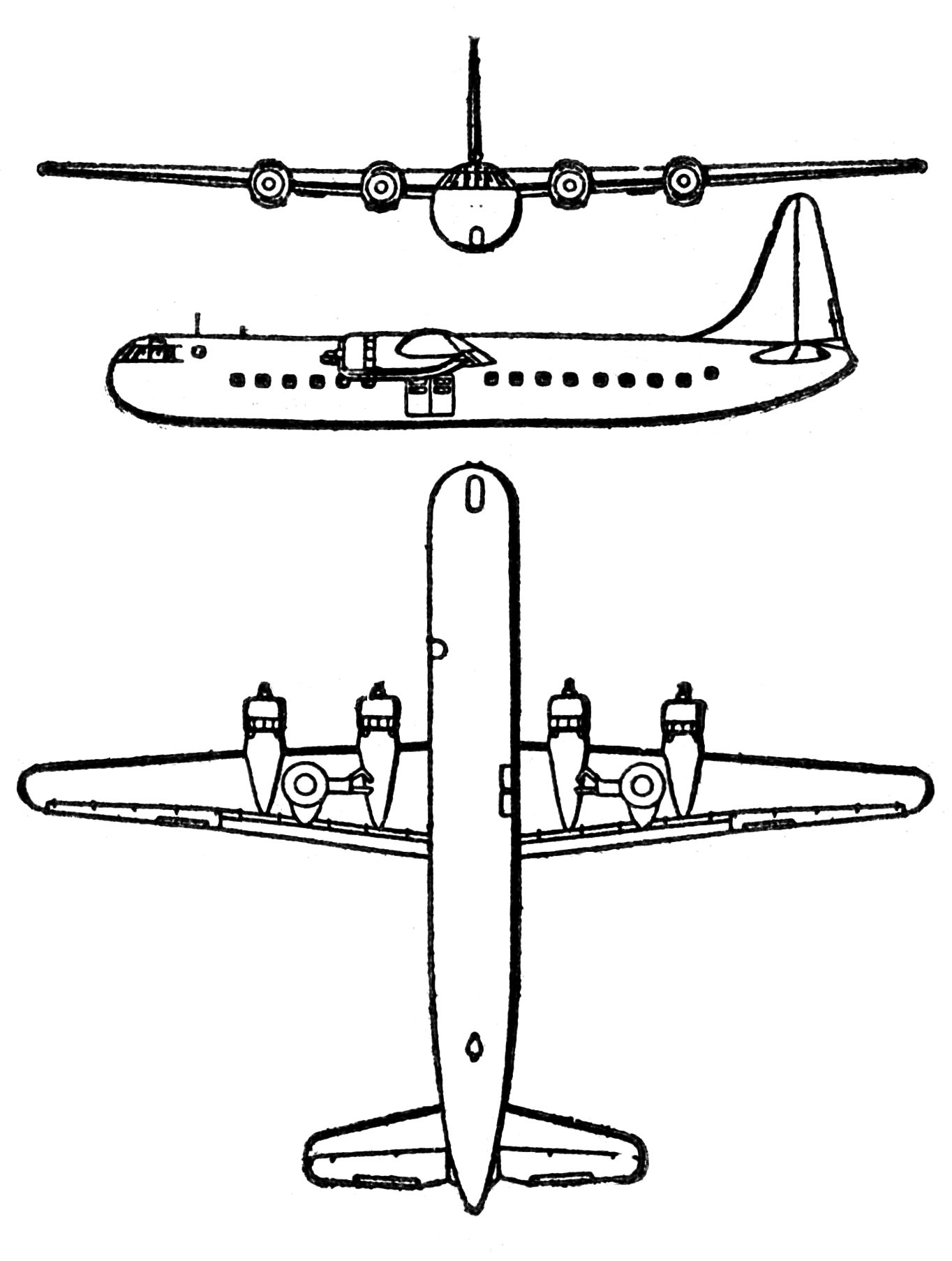
Consolidated XR2Y-1 3-view drawing from Les Ailes February 22, 1947

Data from Jane's Fighting Aircraft of World War II

General characteristics

- Crew: unknown
- Capacity:
  - 48 passengers
  - Their baggage
  - 1,200 lb (550 kg) of mail
  - 12,000 lb (5,500 kg) of cargo (after refit)
- Length: 90 ft 0 in (27.45 m)
- Wingspan: 110 ft 0 in (33.55 m)
- Airfoil: Davis (22% at root to 9.3% at wingtip)
- Gross weight: 56,000 lb (25,000 kg)
- Max takeoff weight: 64,000 lb (29,000 kg)
- Powerplant: 4 × Pratt & Whitney R-1830-94 radial engines, 1,200 hp (900 kW) each

Performance

- Cruise speed: 240 mph (380 km/h, 210 kn)
- Range: 4,000 mi (6,400 km, 3,500 nmi) at 200 mph (322 km/h)

== See also ==
Related development

- Consolidated B-24 Liberator
- Consolidated C-87 Liberator Express
- Consolidated PB4Y-2 Privateer

Aircraft of comparable role, configuration, and era

- Boeing 307 Stratoliner
- Boeing 377 Stratocruiser

Related lists

- List of United States Navy aircraft designations (pre-1962)
