= University Airport =

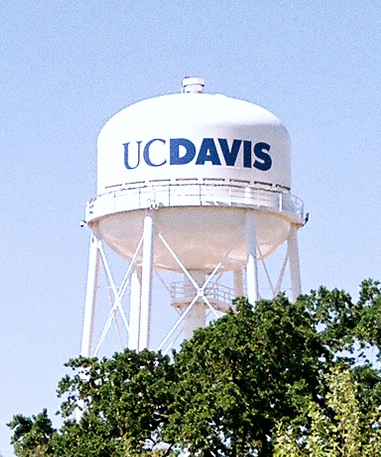
- IATA: none; ICAO: KEDU; FAA LID: EDU

Summary
- Airport type: Public
- Owner: University of California
- Location: Unincorporated Yolo County near Davis, California
- Elevation AMSL: 69 ft (21 m)
- Coordinates: 38°31′53″N 121°47′11″W
- Website: University Airport
- Interactive map of University Airport

Runways
Direction	Length		Surface
Direction	ft	m	Surface
17/35	3,176	968	Asphalt

Statistics (2009)
- Aircraft operations: 24,475
- Source: FAA and airport web site

University Airport (ICAO: KEDU, FAA LID: EDU, formerly 0O5) is a public-use airport located two nautical miles (4 km) west of the central business district of Davis, a city in Yolo County, California, United States. It is owned by the University of California and operated by Transportation Services of the University of California, Davis. Of the ten campuses in the UC system, Davis is the only one with its own airport. It was the first university airport in the United States.

Although most U.S. airports use the same three-letter location identifier for the FAA and IATA, this airport is assigned EDU by the FAA but has no designation from the IATA.

The airport opened in 1946 and was acquired by the University of California four years later, as part of an acquisition of the adjacent Straloch Farm. 100LL fuel and transient aircraft tiedowns are available. Two fixed base operators are located on the field: the Cal Aggie Flying Farmers flight school and Davis Air Repair.

The airport is used today by UC Davis students, faculty, and staff to travel to locations around California. The airport is also used to bring sick animals to UC Davis for treatment at the veterinary school.

== Facilities and aircraft ==
University Airport covers an area of 95 acres (38 ha) and contains one asphalt paved runway designated 17/35 which measures 3,176 x 50 ft (968 x 15 m). For the 12-month period ending June 30, 2010, the airport had 24,475 aircraft operations, an average of 67 per day: 90% general aviation, 10% air taxi and <1% military.
