= Burzet =

- Commune
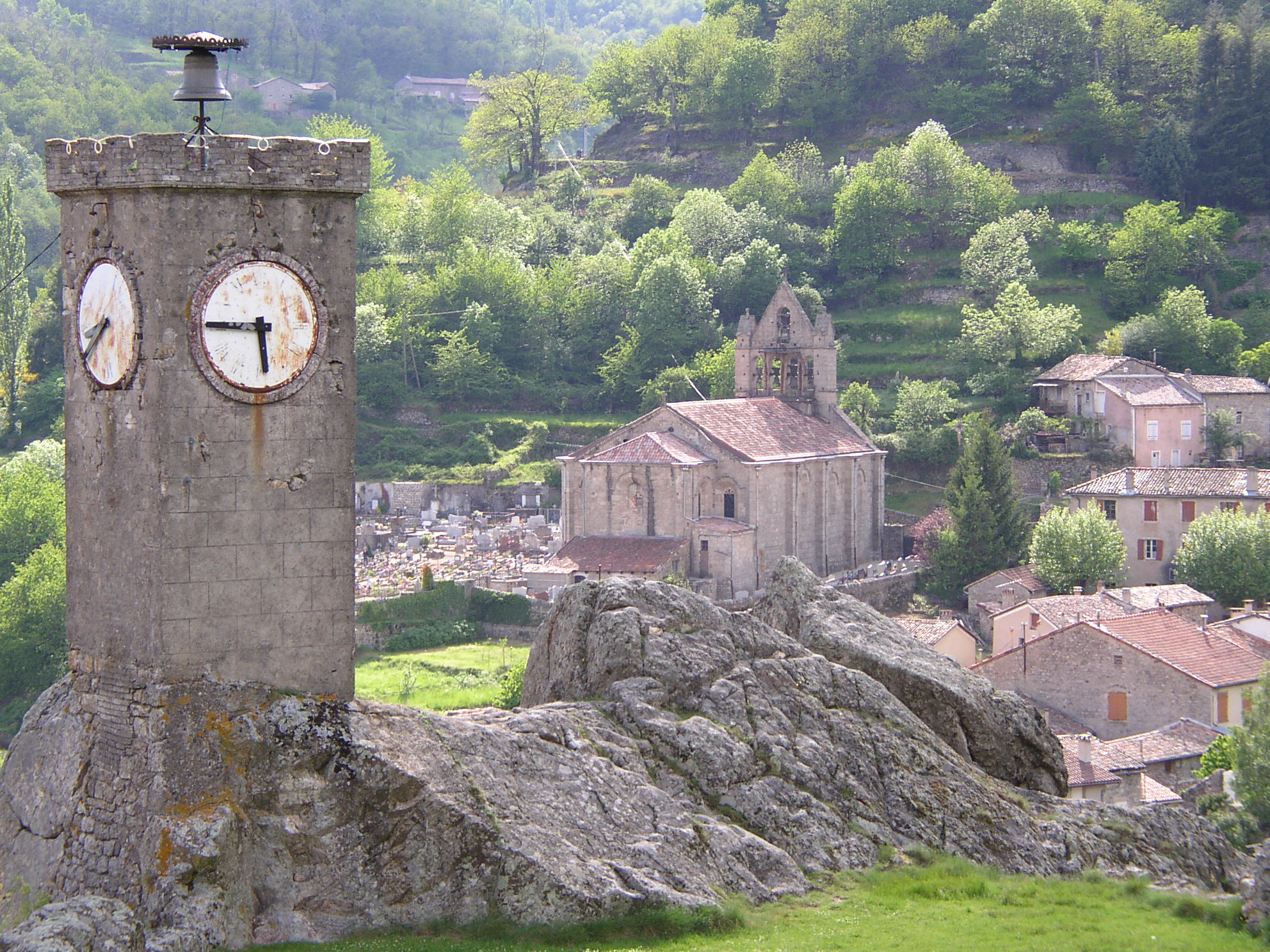
- The church in Burzet

- Coat of arms
- Location of Burzet
- Location within France Location within Auvergne-Rhône-Alpes
- Coordinates: 44°44′27″N 4°14′43″E
- Country: France
- Region: Auvergne-Rhône-Alpes
- Department: Ardèche
- Arrondissement: Largentière
- Canton: Haute-Ardèche

Government
  - Mayor (2020–2026): Jean-Pierre Reymond
- Area^{1}: 38.06 km^{2} (14.70 sq mi)
- Elevation: 300 m (980 ft)
- Highest elevation: 1,393 m (4,570 ft)
- Lowest elevation: 465 m (1,526 ft)
- Population (2023): 536
  - Density: 14.1/km^{2} (36.5/sq mi)
- Time zone: UTC+01:00 (CET)
  - Summer (DST): UTC+02:00 (CEST)
- INSEE/Postal code: 07045 /07450
- ^{1} French Land Register data, which excludes lakes, ponds, glaciers > 1 km^{2} (0.386 sq mi or 247 acres) and river estuaries.

Burzet (French pronunciation: [byʁzɛ]) is a commune in the Ardèche department in southern France.

== Notable people ==
- Victor Plantevin (1900–1983), politician

== See also ==
- Communes of the Ardèche department
