= Rogers Field =

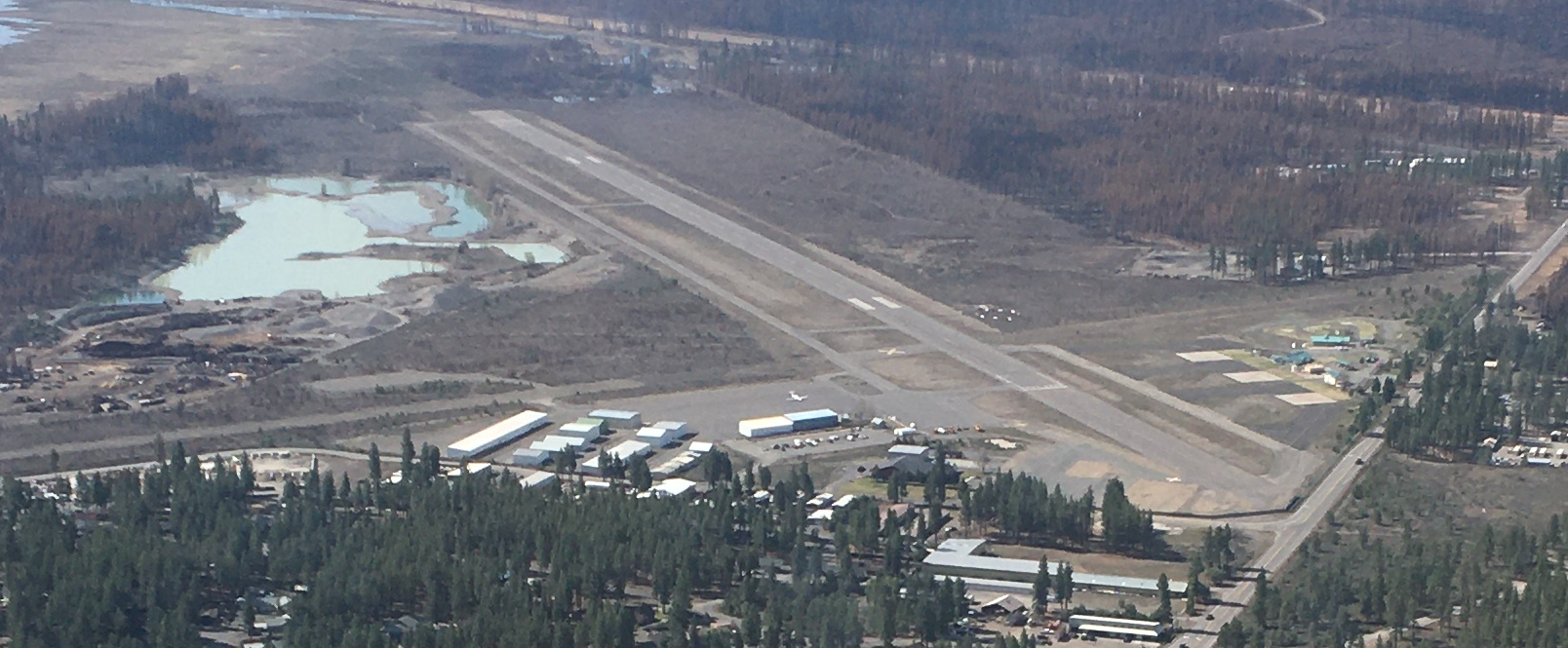
- IATA: none; ICAO: none; FAA LID: O05

Summary
- Airport type: Public
- Location: Chester, California
- Elevation AMSL: 4,528 ft / 1,380 m
- Coordinates: 40°16′56.470″N 121°14′28.21″W
- Interactive map of Rogers Field

Runways
Direction	Length		Surface
Direction	ft	m	Surface
16/34	5,000	1,524	Asphalt
5/23	5,320	1,622	Gravel

Rogers Field (FAA LID: O05) is a public airport bordering the southwest of the town of Chester, serving Plumas County, California, United States. It has two runways (only one of which is still opened and maintained, however) and is mostly used for general aviation and USFS/CDF access.

In addition to its civil-aviation role it also serves as the Chester Air Attack Base, a logistical and coordination facility owned and managed by Lassen National Forest (LNF), USFS, for the support of the LNF Air Attack 06, Copter 510, California Department of Forestry's aerial firefighting aircraft (both fixed-wing and helicopter) and other air tankers and heli-tankers leased by the USFS. Resources include fueling, retardant loading for aerial tankers, communications, and some quartering for aircrew, helitack, and ground fire-fighting teams.

== Facilities ==
Rogers Field has two runways:

- Runway 16/34: 5,000 x 100 ft (1,524 x 30 m), surface: asphalt
- Runway 5/23: 5,320 x 120 ft (1,622 x 37 m), surface: dirt

Runway 5/23 is closed indefinitely and no longer maintained.
