= Naval Base Marshall Islands =

Major World War II Naval Bases in Marshall Islands

- United States Navy base
- Location of Majuro in Marshall Islands Naval Base Marshall Islands (Pacific Ocean) Naval Base Marshall Islands (Earth)
- Island Chain: Ratak Chain
- Founded: 1944
- Time zone: UTC+12 (MHT)

Map of Marshall Islands in Micronesia (shown in dark magenta)

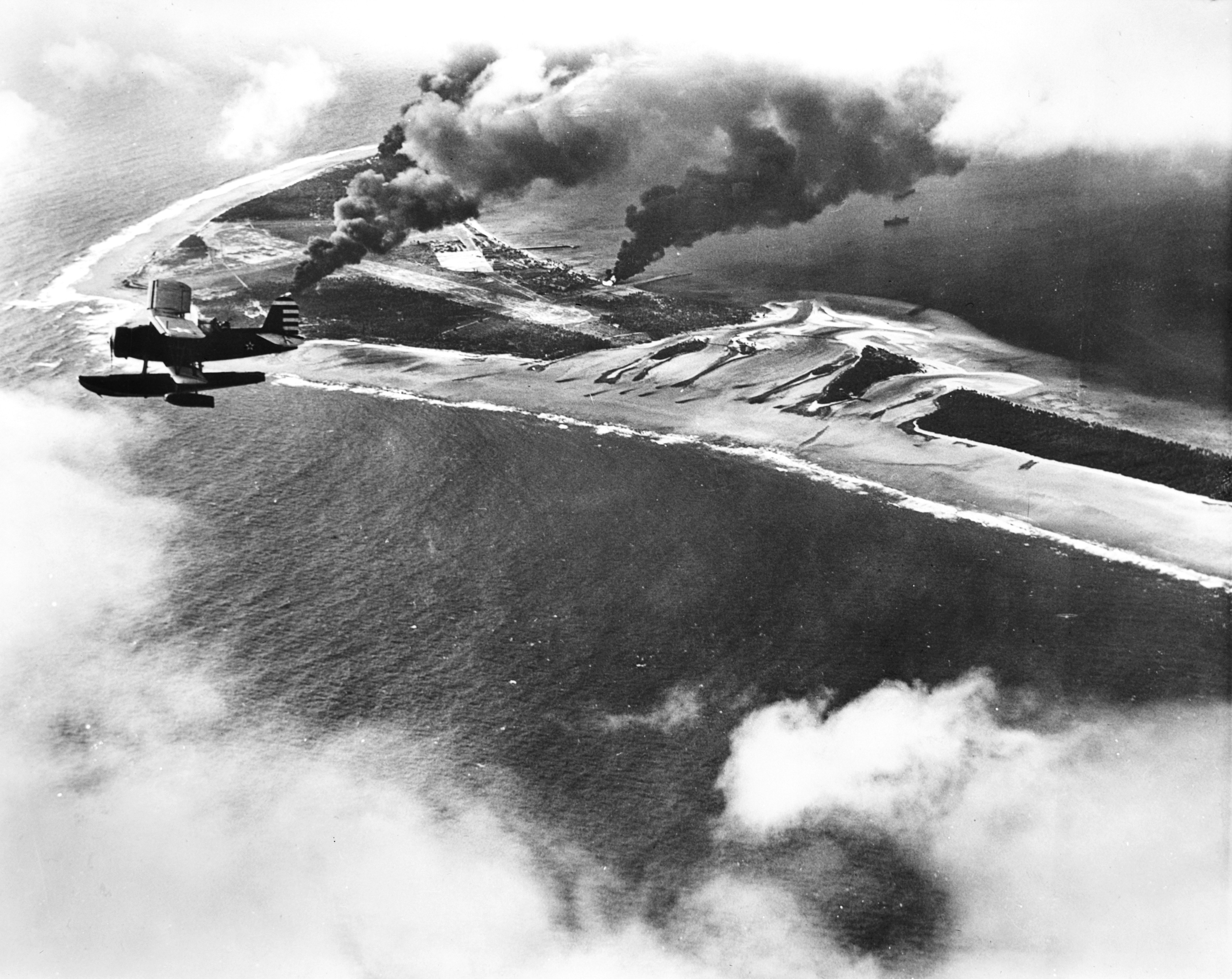
Curtiss SOC Seagull flies over Wotje Atoll in the Marshall Islands on 1 February 1942

Naval Base Marshall Islands were United States Navy advance bases built on the Marshall Islands during World War II to support the Pacific War efforts. The bases were built by US Navy after the Marshall Islands campaign that captured the islands from the Empire of Japan. By February 1944 the United States Armed Forces had captured the islands. Most of the airfields and other facilities Japan had built were destroyed in allied bombing raids and naval bombardment. US Navy Seabee Construction Battalions arrived as soon as the area was secured and remove the debris. The Seabees quickly repaired, built and improved the airfield/runways and seaport. Seabees often worked around the clock to get airfields operational so that fighter aircraft and bombers could start operating. The bases were used for staging upcoming campaigns and for repair.

== History ==
At the start of World War I, Japan took control of the Marshall Islands from the German Empire. Japan built bases on many of the islands and had troops stationed on the Marshall Islands. The tropical Marshall Islands are near the Equator in the Pacific Ocean, slightly west of the International Date Line. Marshall Islands has over five major islands and 29 coral atolls comprising 1,156 individual islands and islets. The Marshall Islands capital and largest city is Majuro on a large coral atoll, Majuro atoll. The US Navy built bases for troops, ships, submarines, PT boats, seaplanes, supply depots, training camps, fleet recreation facilities, and ship repair depots. To keep supplies following the bases were supplied by the vast World War II United States Merchant Navy. The Marshall Islands were in Japan's inner line of defense and 2,887 miles from Japan's homeland. At the end of the war, the Marshall Islands came under the control of the United States as part of the Trust Territory of the Pacific Islands until the independence of the Marshall Islands in 1986.

== US Navy Marshall Islands Bases ==
Major US Navy Bases:

- Naval Base Eniwetok, Fleet PO Box 3237, after Battle of Eniwetok
  - Naval Base Engebi on Engebi Island in Enewetak Atoll to support Wrigley Airfield, Fleet PO Box 3236
- Naval Base Kwajalein, Fleet PO Box 3233, won in Battle of Kwajalein
- Naval Base Majuro, Fleet PO Box 3234
  - Majuro Submarine Base
  - Majuro Destroyer Base
- Naval Base Ujelang, on Ujelang Atoll, Fleet PO Box 3238, staging base for Battle of Peleliu
- Naval Base Mille, on Mili Atoll to support Milo Airfield, Fleet PO Box 3250
- Naval Base Moloelap on Maloelap Atoll, to support Taroa Airfield, Fleet PO Box 3119
- Naval Base at Jaluit Atoll, FPO#3000

Minor US Navy bases:

- Wotje Atoll on Ormed Island, Fleet PO Box 3243, Naval base to support Wotje Airfield.
- Bikini Atoll, Fleet PO Box 3078, Operation Crossroads test site
- Rongelap Atoll, Fleet PO Box 3244, former Japan base, Atoll islanders were evacuated before US Castle Bravo test fallout.
- Rongerik Atoll, Fleet PO Box 3055, toll islanders were evacuated before Castle Bravo test fallout.
- Taongi Atoll, Fleet PO Box 3057
- Likiep Atoll, Fleet PO Box 3058
- Erikub Atoll, Fleet PO Box 3059
- Ailinglaplap Atoll, Fleet PO Box 3060
- Namu Atoll, Fleet PO Box 3071
- Kusaie Island and Lelu Harbor, Fleet PO Box 3072
- Ebon Atoll, Fleet PO Box 3073
- Ujae Atoll, Fleet PO Box 3076
- Jaluit Atoll (Majuro Fleet PO Box)
- Maug Island, Fleet PO Box 3077

== Post war ==
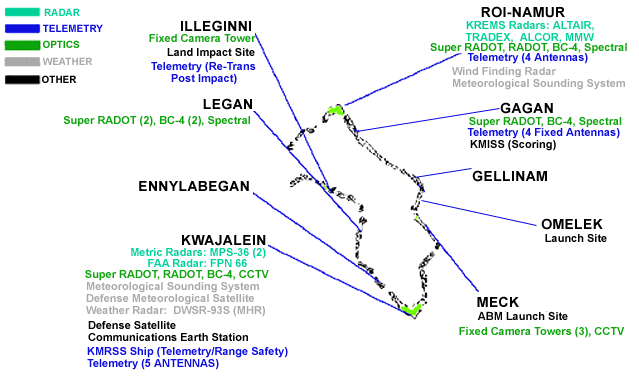
Map of Kwajalein Missile Range, now called Reagan Test Site

At the end of the war, the Marshall Islands came under the control of the United States as part of the Trust Territory of the Pacific Islands until the independence of the Marshall Islands in 1986. The Marshall Islands were given self-government on 1 May 1979. The Compact of Free Association was made between the Marshall Islands and United States on 21 October 1986. As a result of the close associations, the United States dollar and English are used in the Marshall Islands. The Compact of Free Association agrees that US is responsible the defense of the Marshall Islands. The compact gives the Marshall Islands (Marshallese) the right to emigrate, without a visa, to the United States.

The vast Kwajalein Missile Range was built Marshall Islands during the Cold War.

== Gallery ==
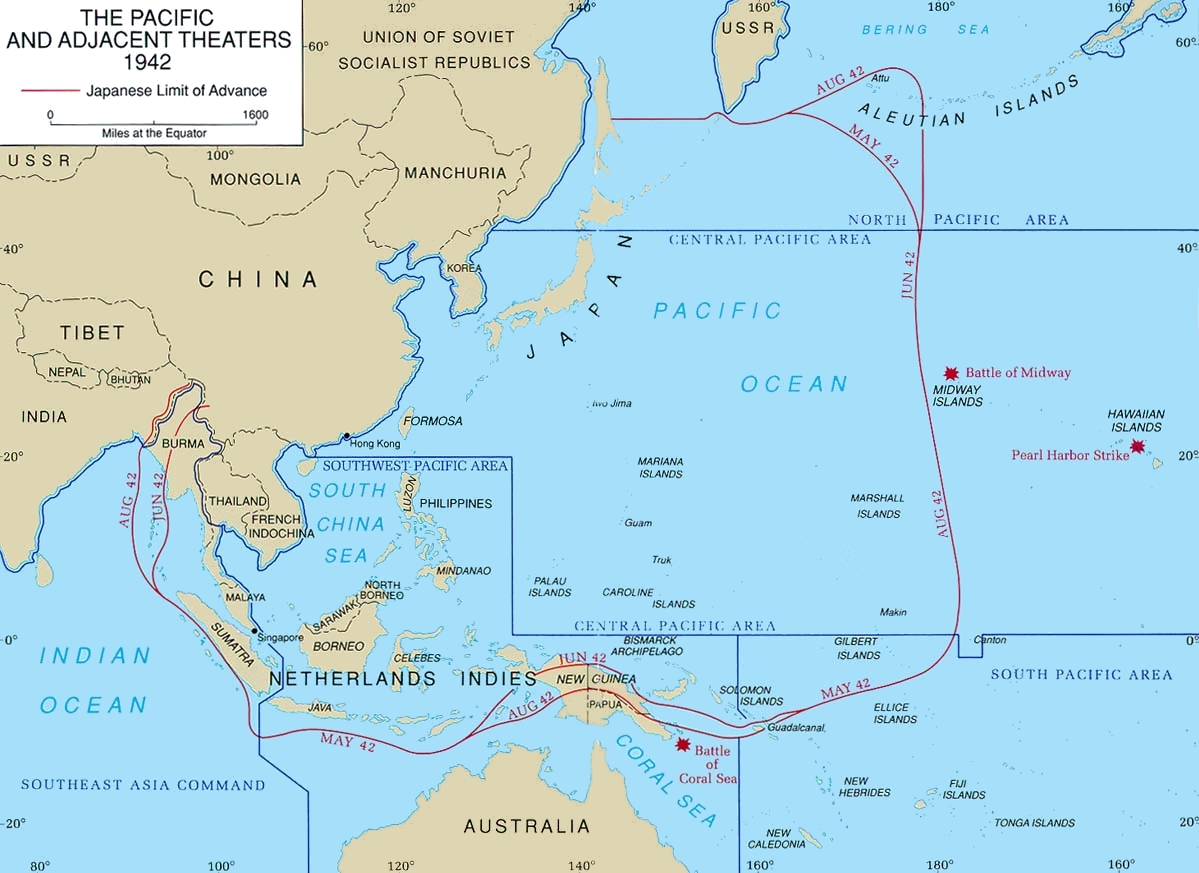
Pacific War Theater Areas map 1942

South Pacific islands in 1945

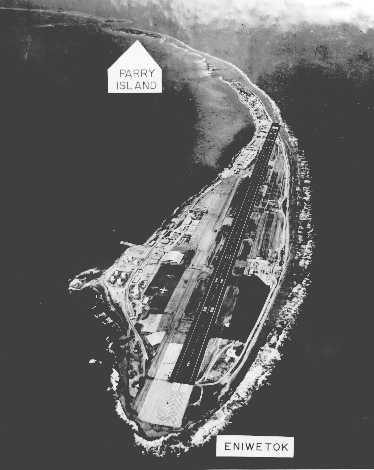
Eniwetok Atoll and Parry Island

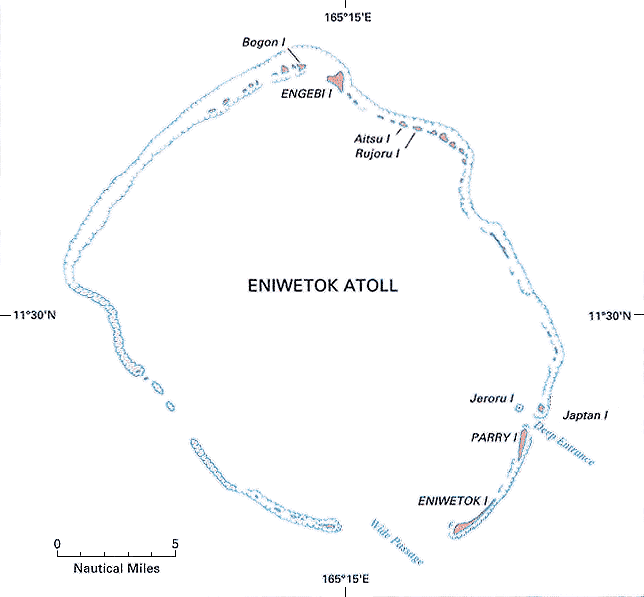
Map Enewetak

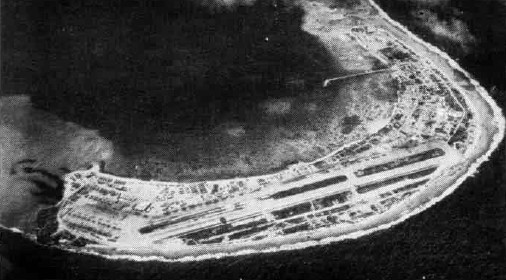
NAS Kwajalein

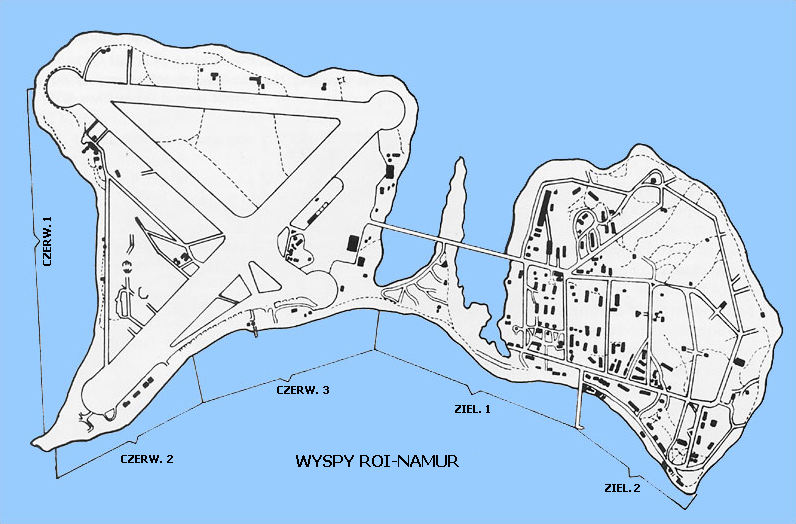
Map Roi-Namur

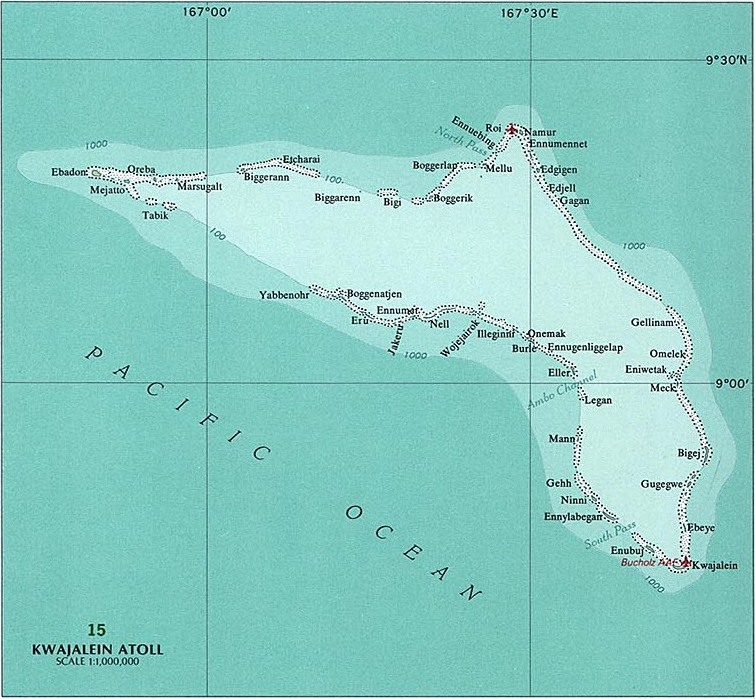
Map Kwajalein Atoll

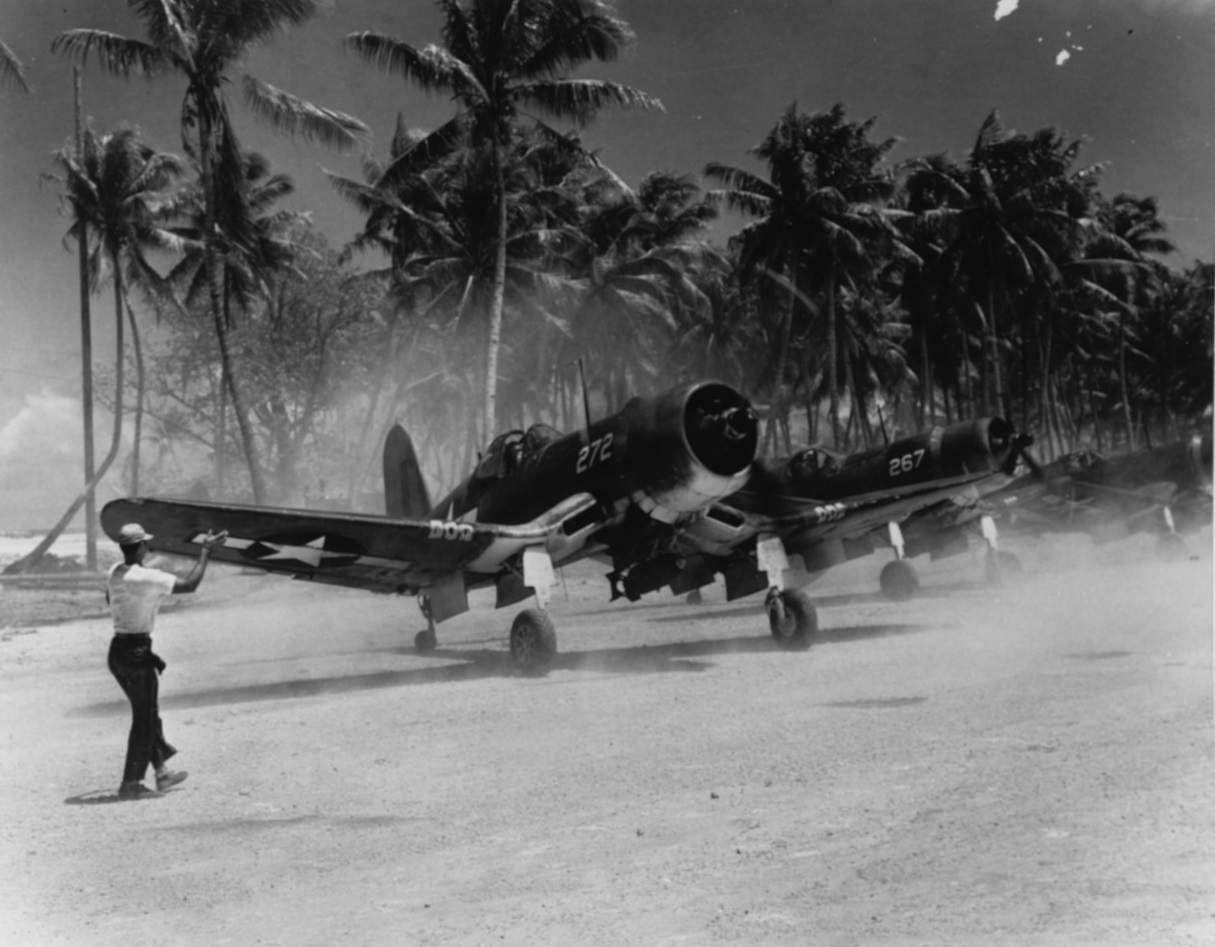
Vought F4U Corsair fighters at Majuro Airfield

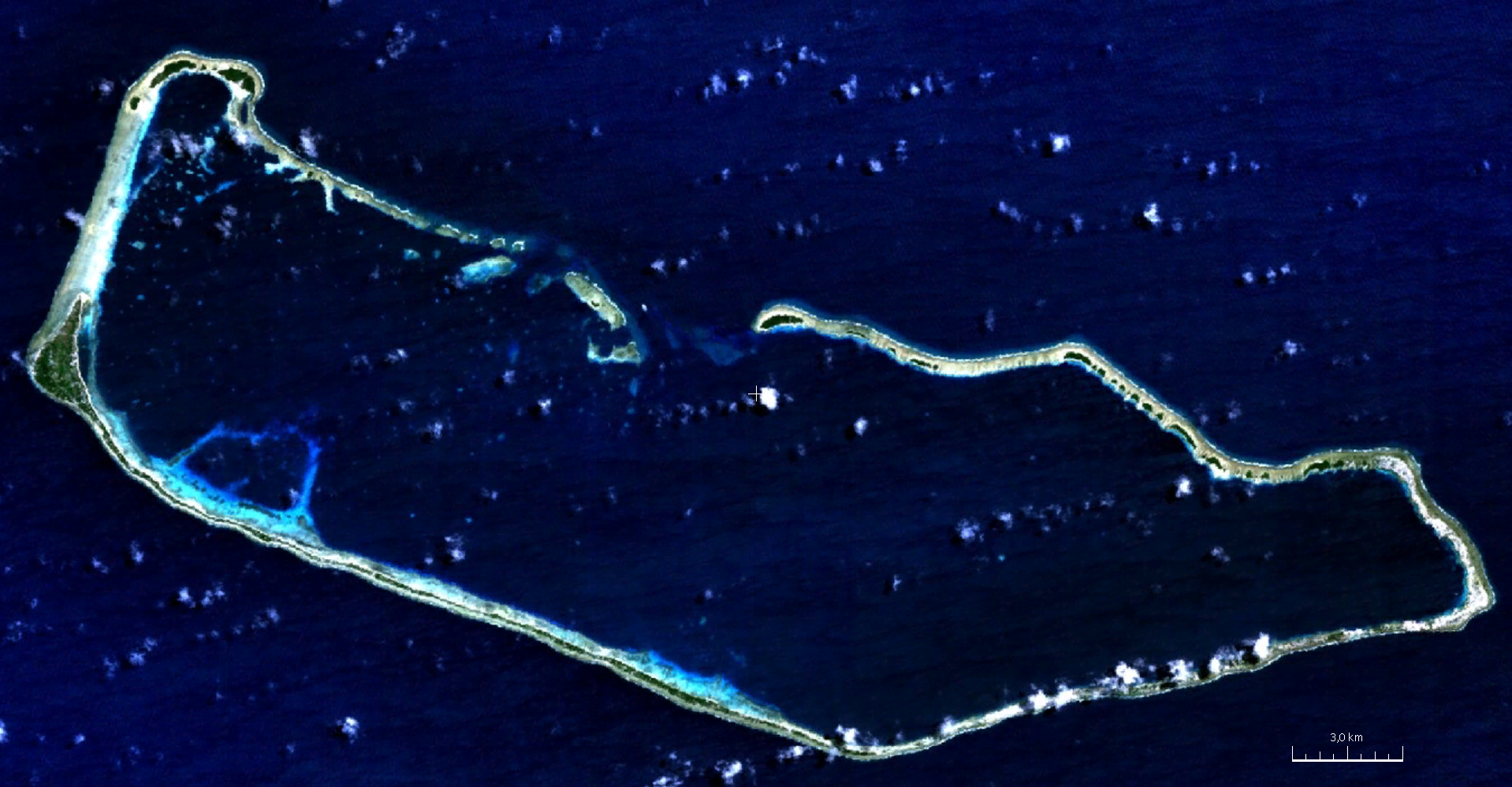
Majuro Atoll Satellite photo

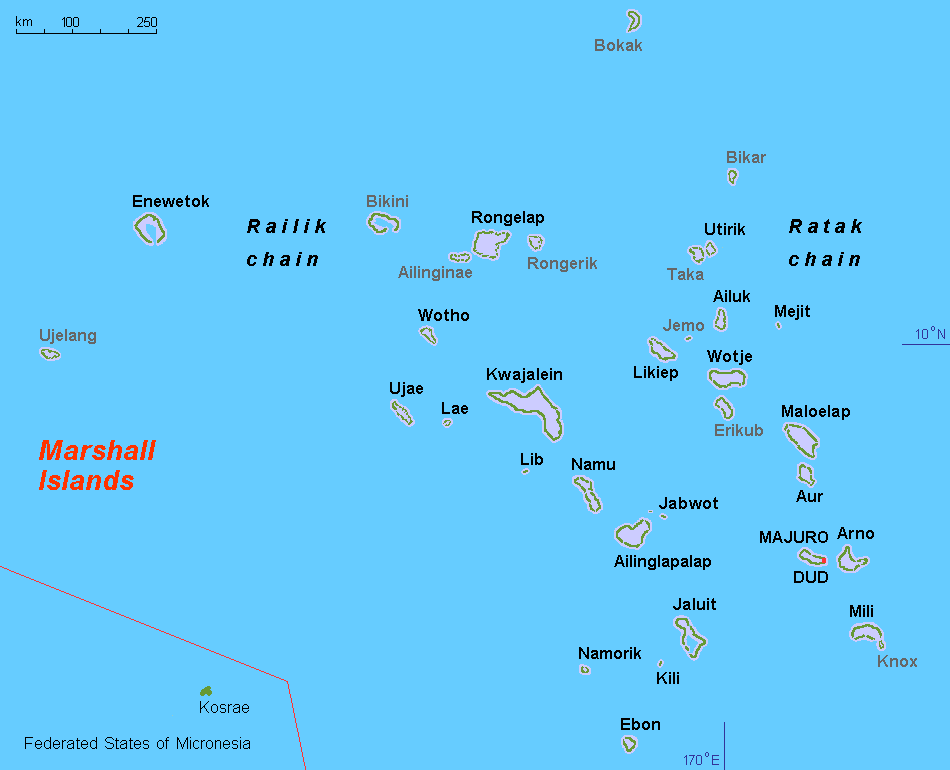
Map of the Marshall Islands

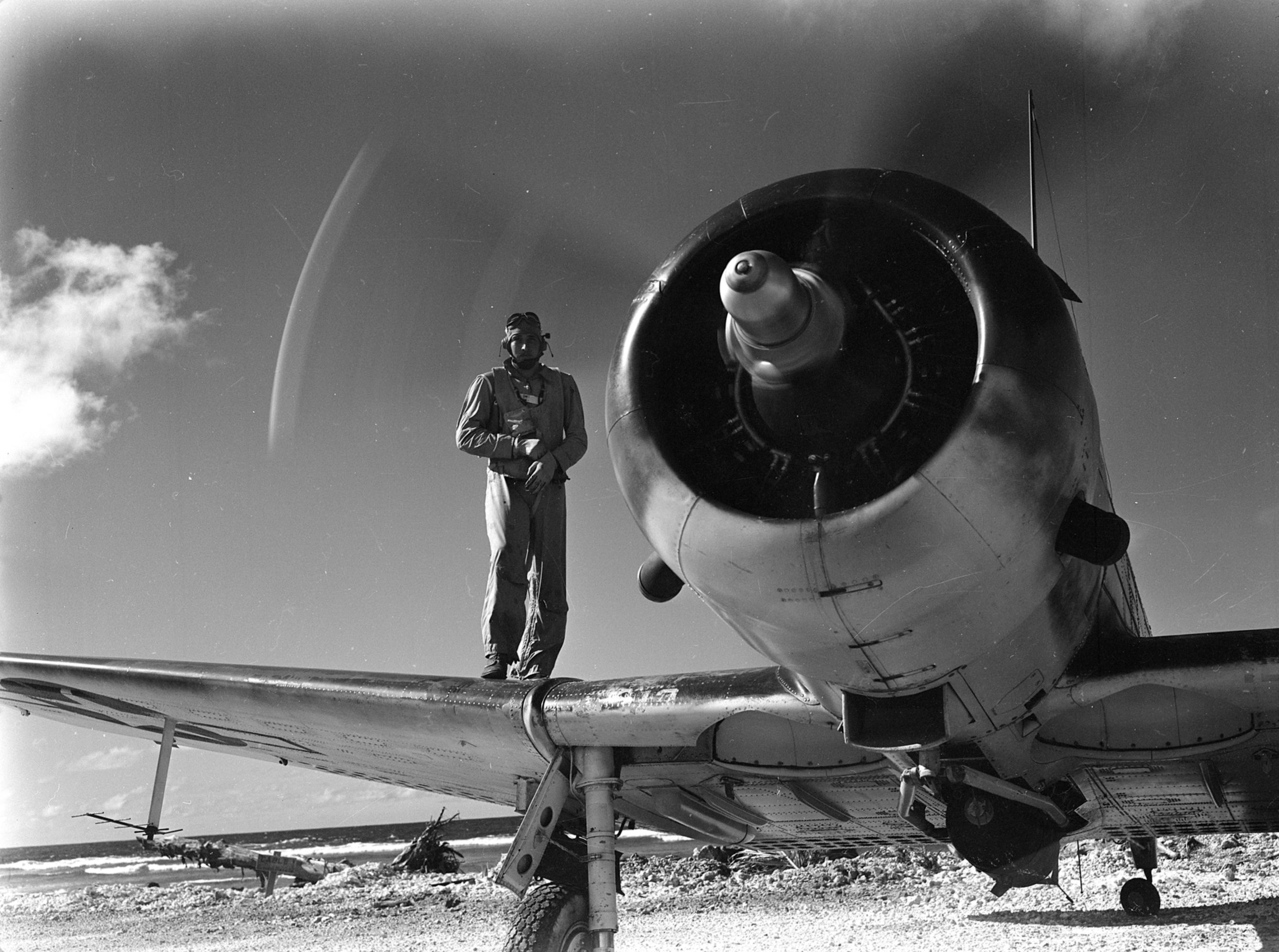
Douglas SBD Dauntless dive bomber at Majuro Airfield

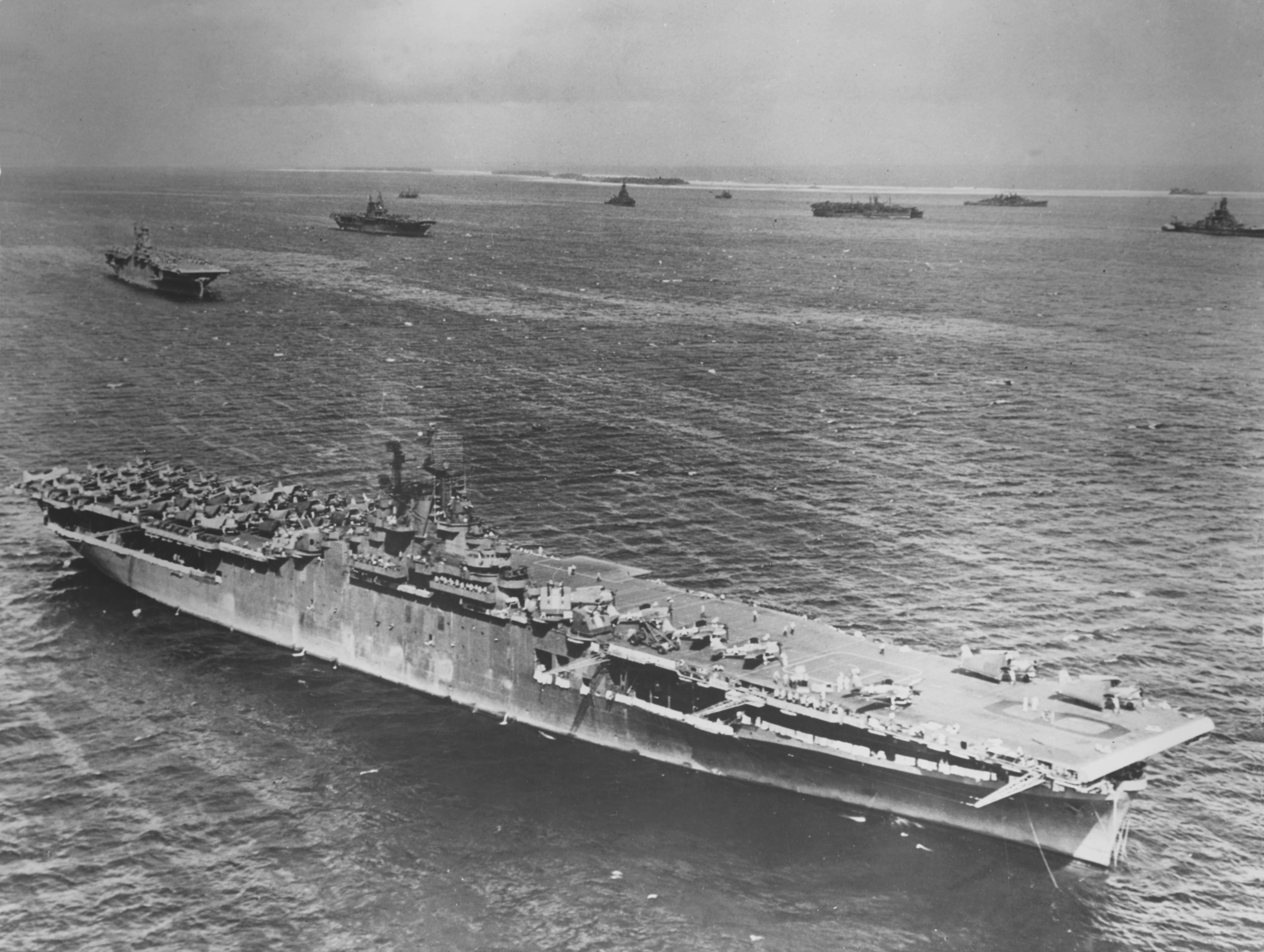
USS Essex (CV-9) at Majuro Atoll on 2 March 1944.jpg

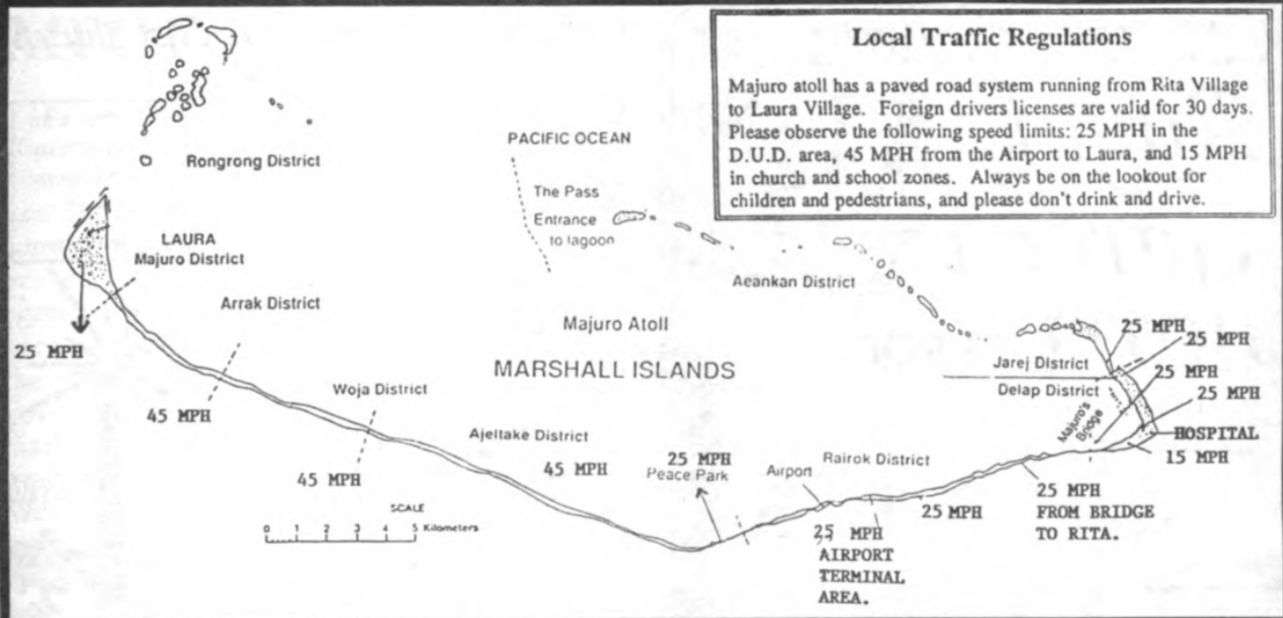
Majuro road built by US Navy

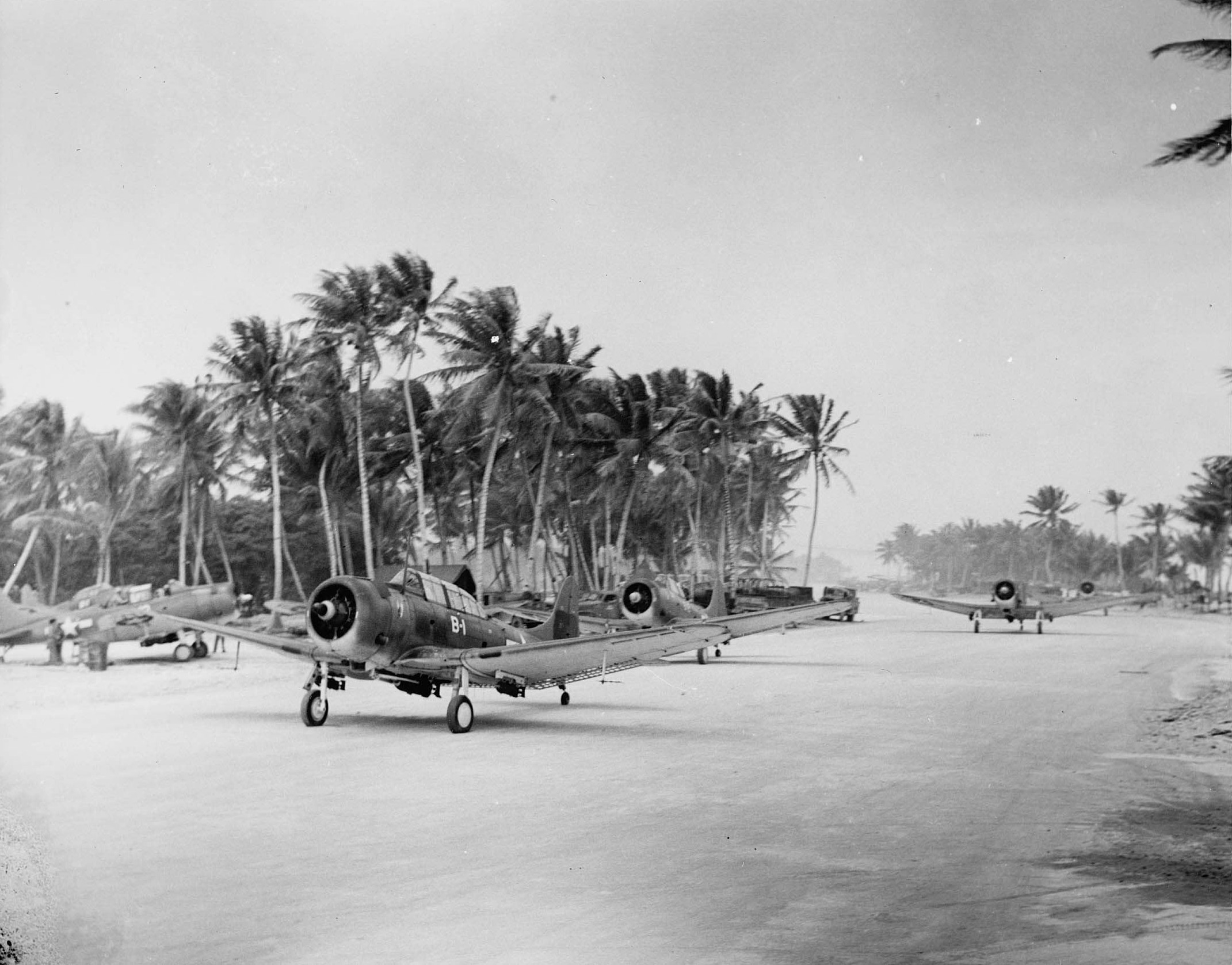
Douglas SBD Dauntlesss with VMSB-231 at Majuro in 1944

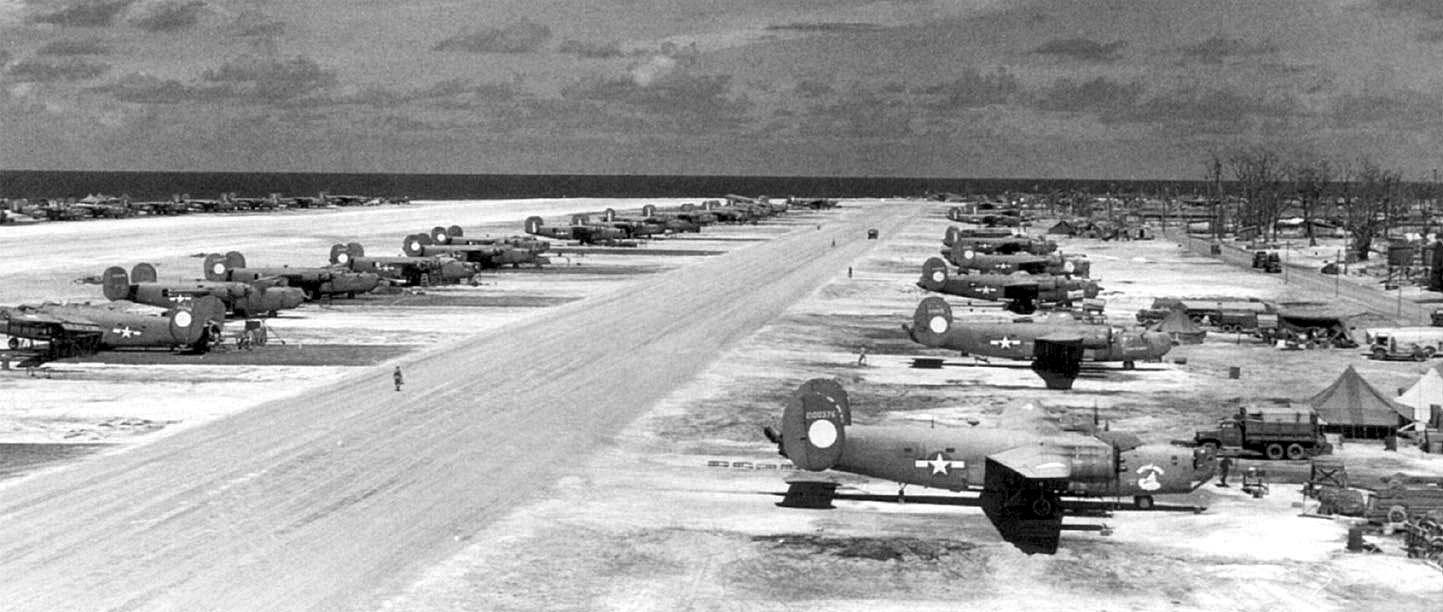
Consolidated B-24 Liberator on Kwajalein in June 1944

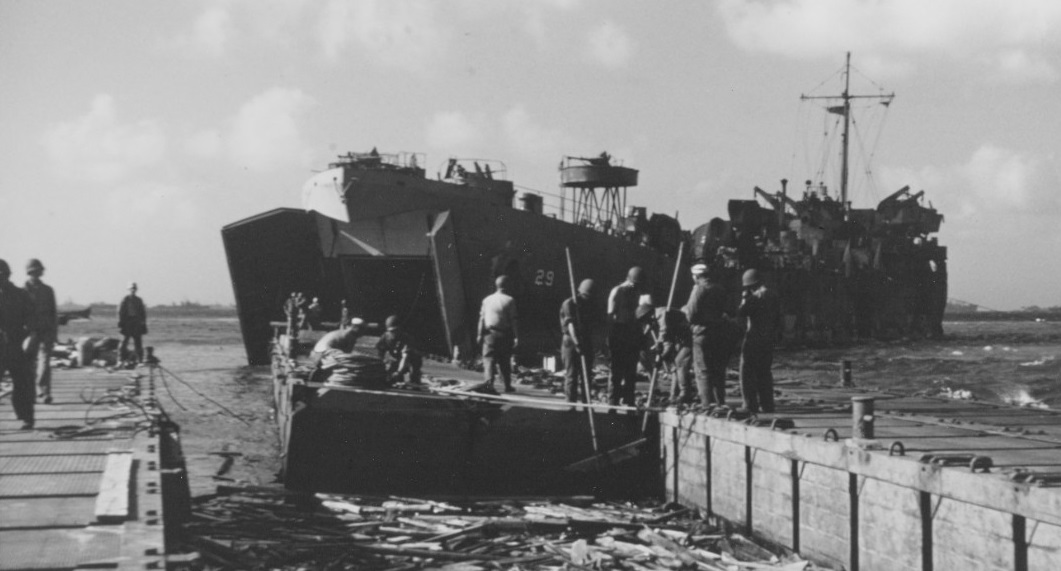
USS LST-29 at Kwajalein causeway February 1944

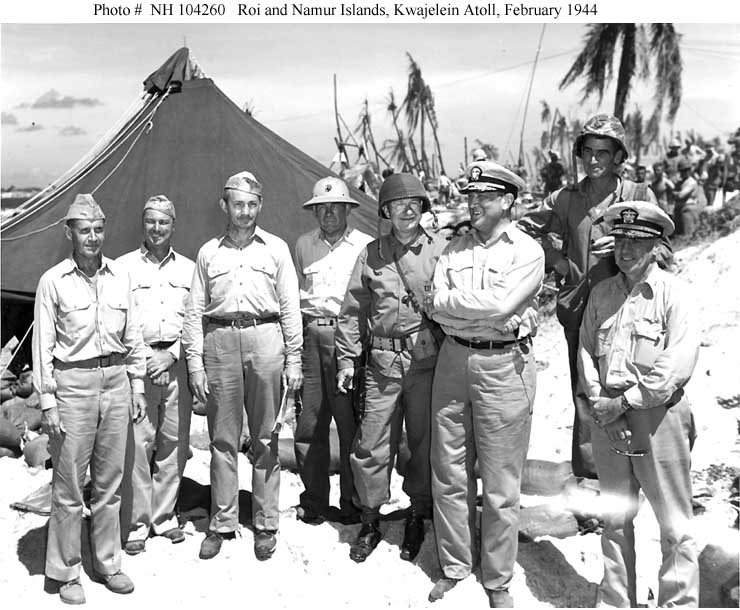
Kwajalein February 1944

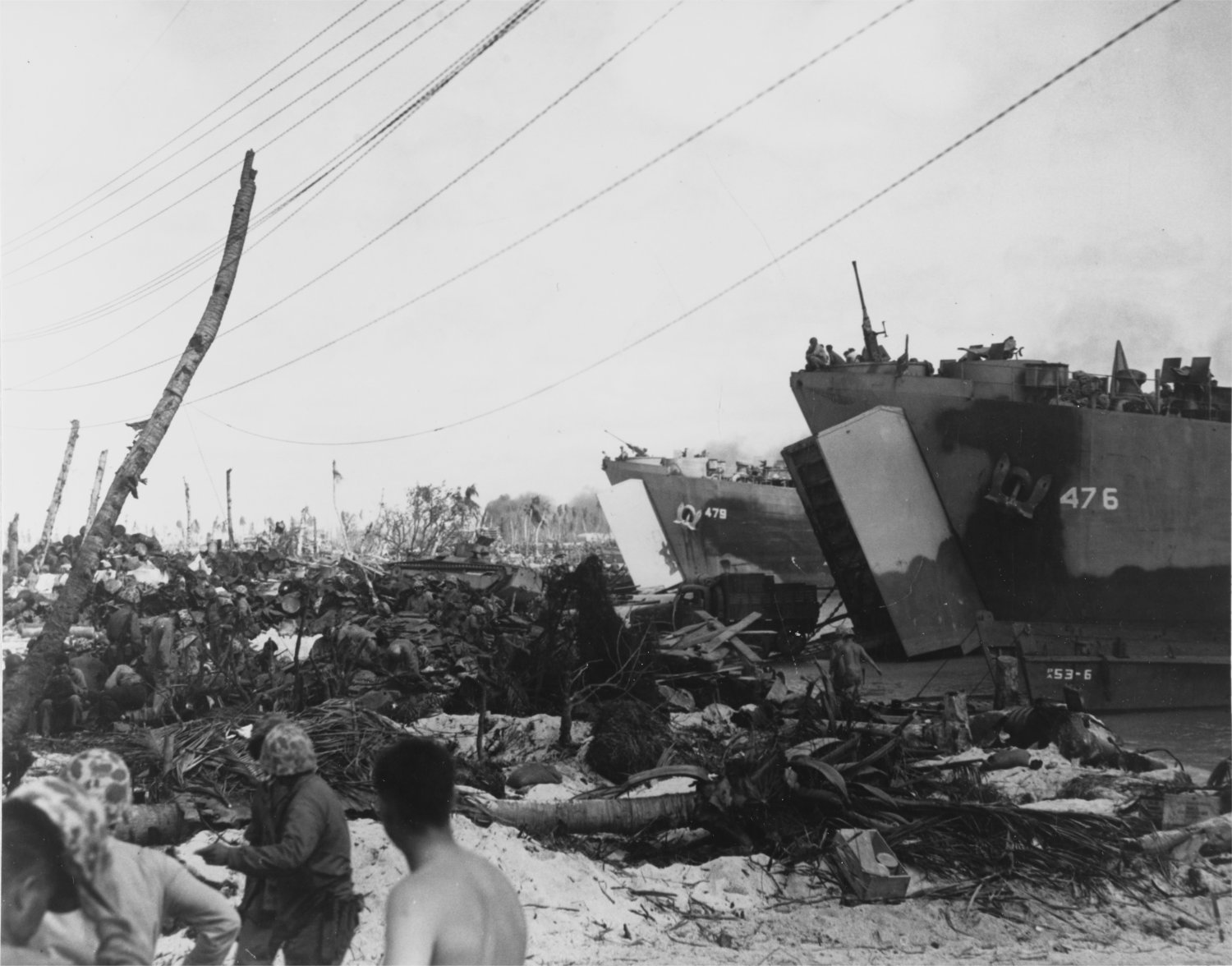
US Navy ship USS LST-476 and USS LST-479 land vehicles and supplies at Roi Island in February 1944

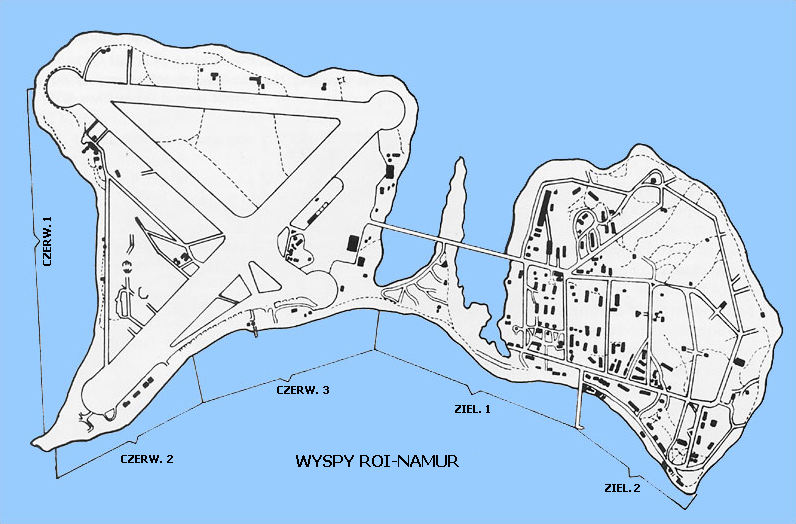
Map of Roi-Namur during World War II. The causeway is roughly centered.

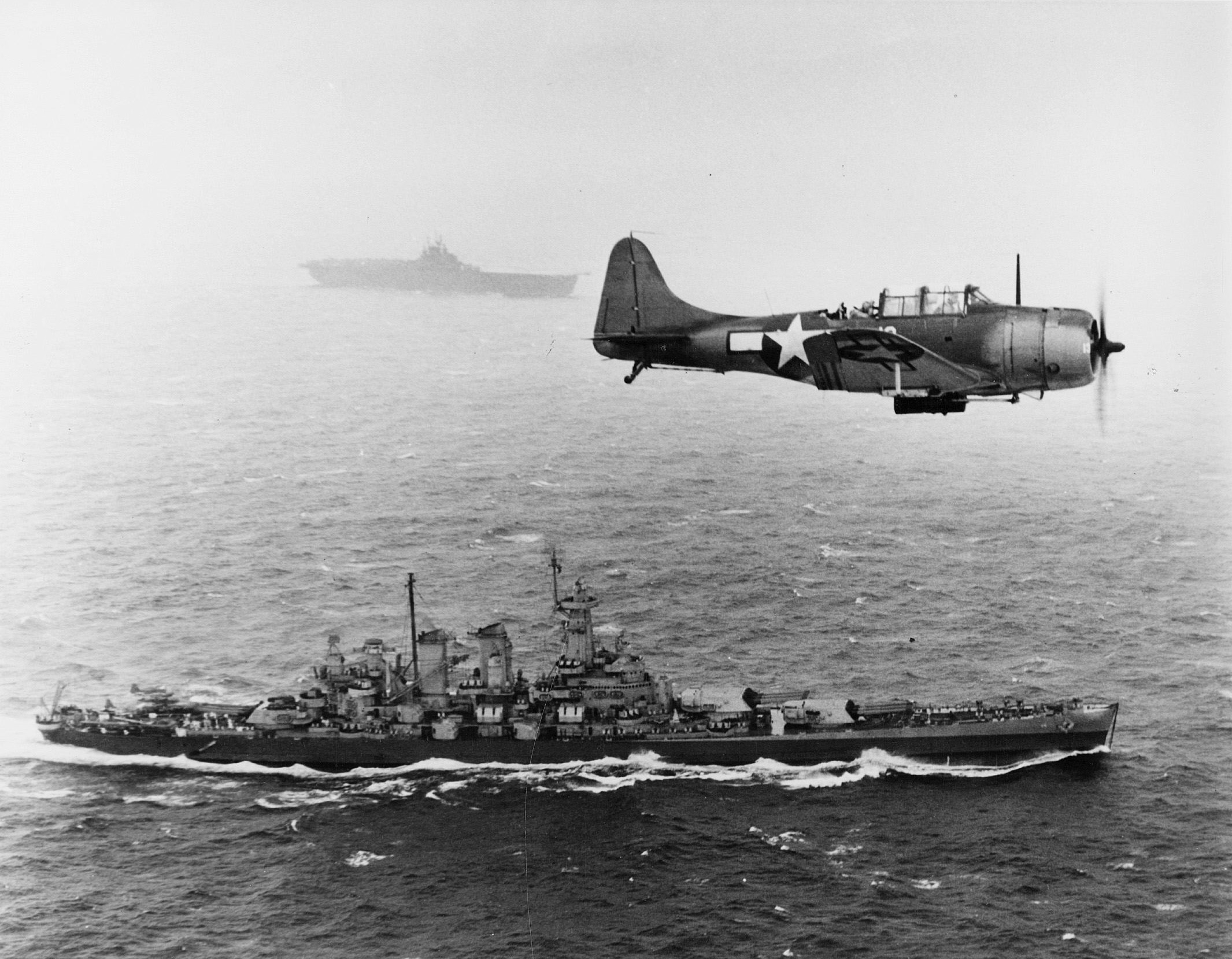
An SBD Dauntless flies patrol over USS Washington and USS Lexington during the Marshall islands campaign.

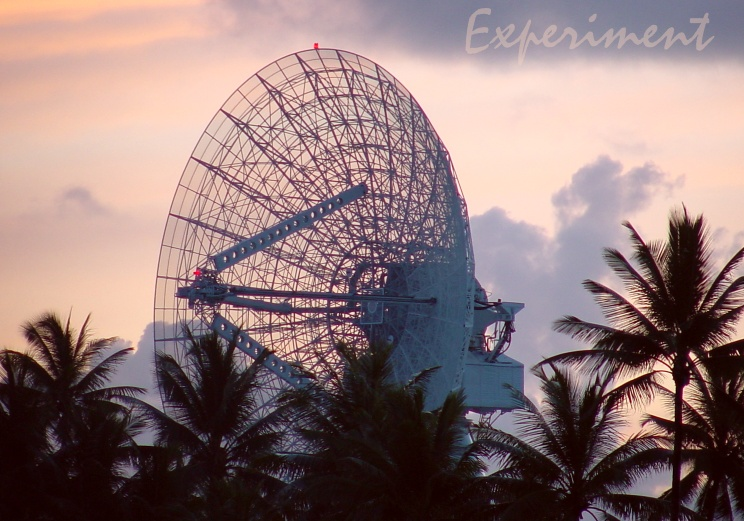
ALTAIR radar at Roi-Namur today

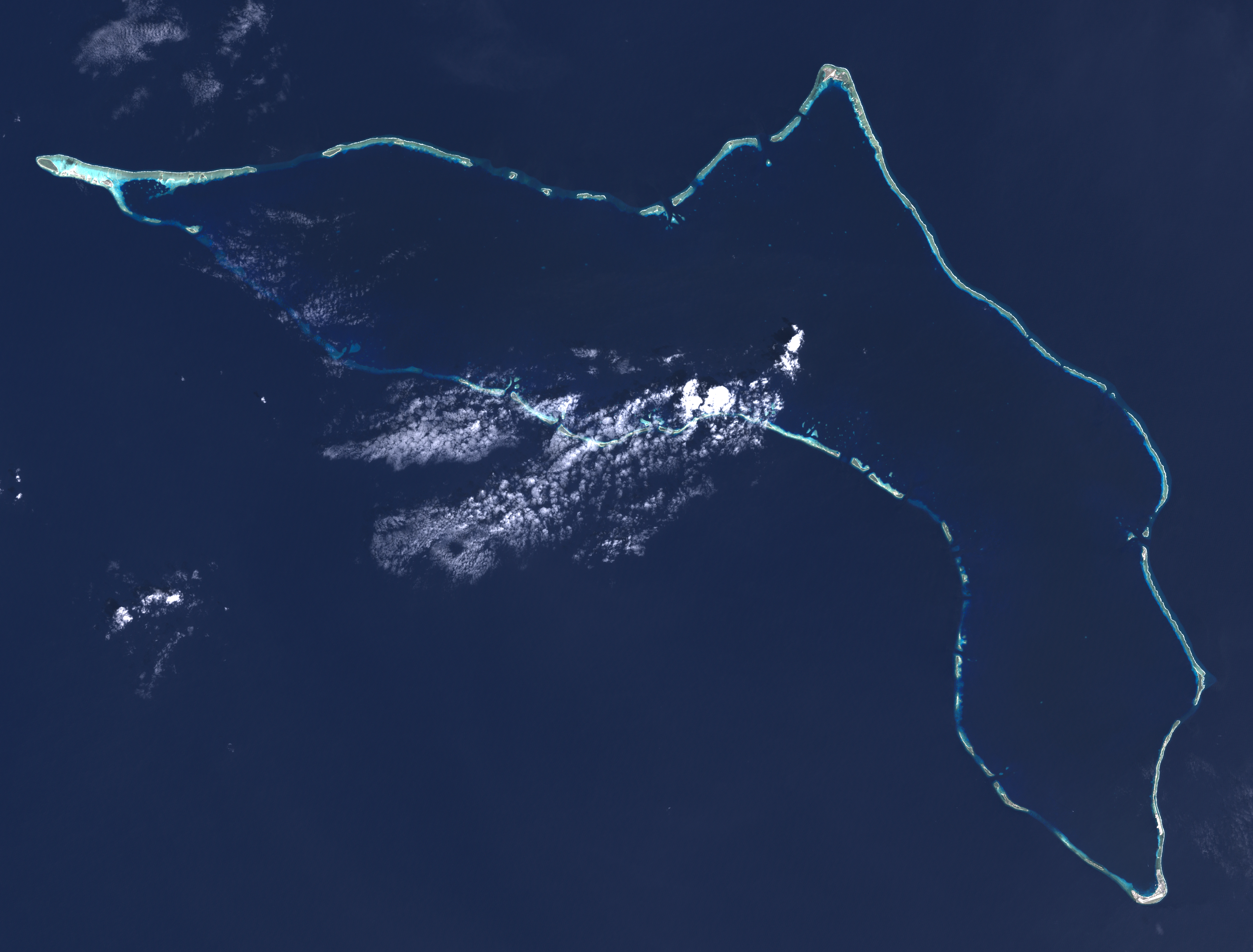
File:Kwajalein Atoll in 2003 by Landsat 7

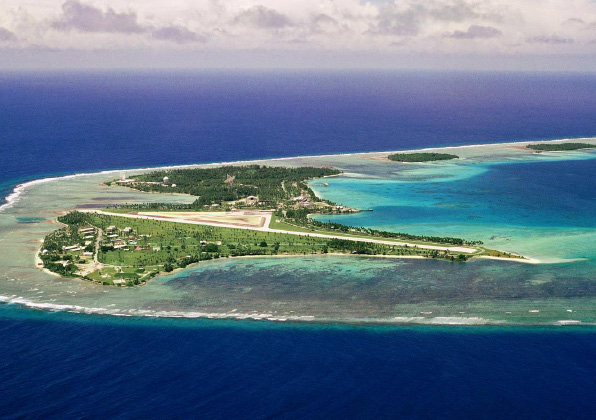
Dyess Army Airfield

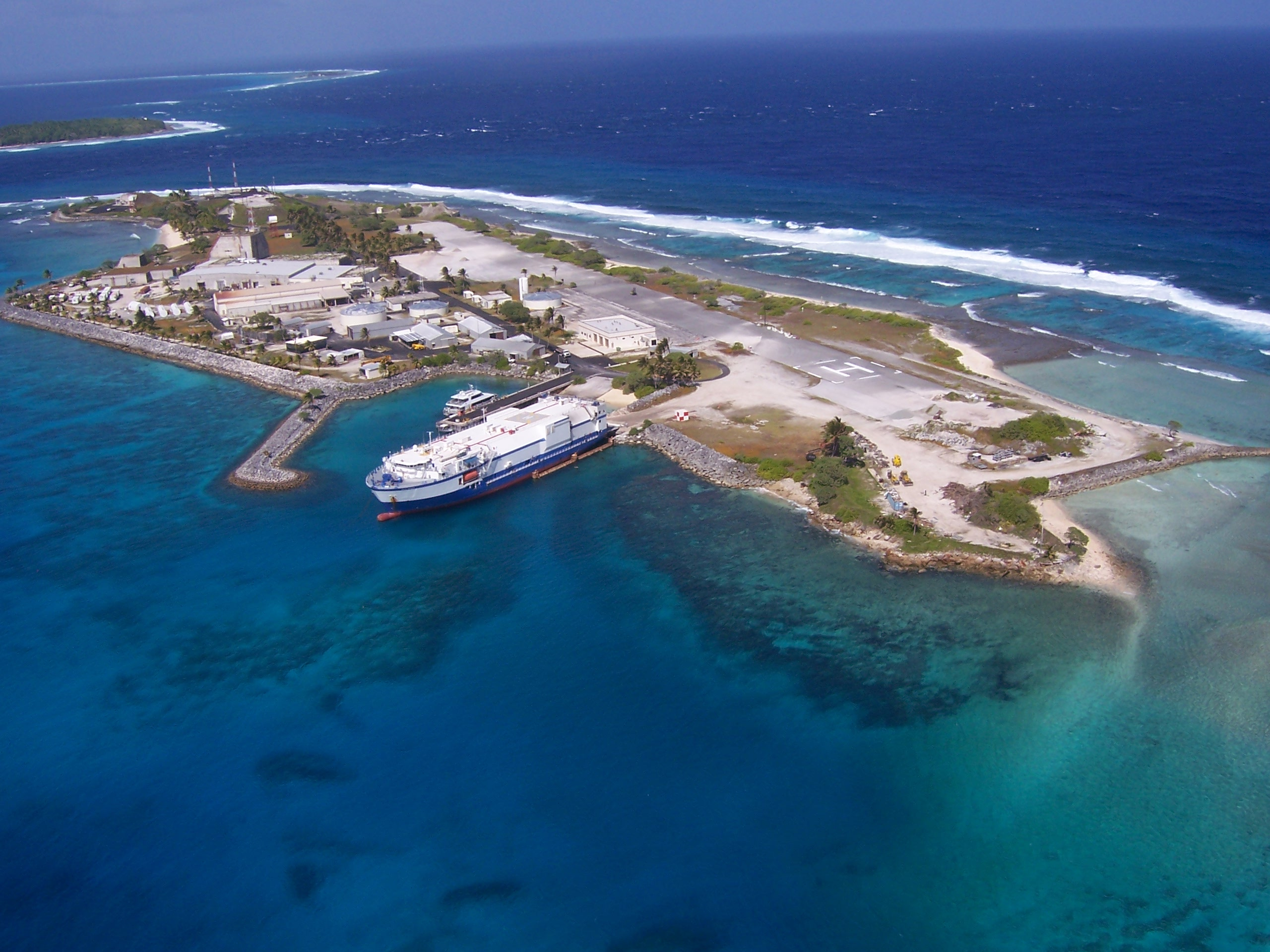
Meck Island part of Kwajalein Missile Range

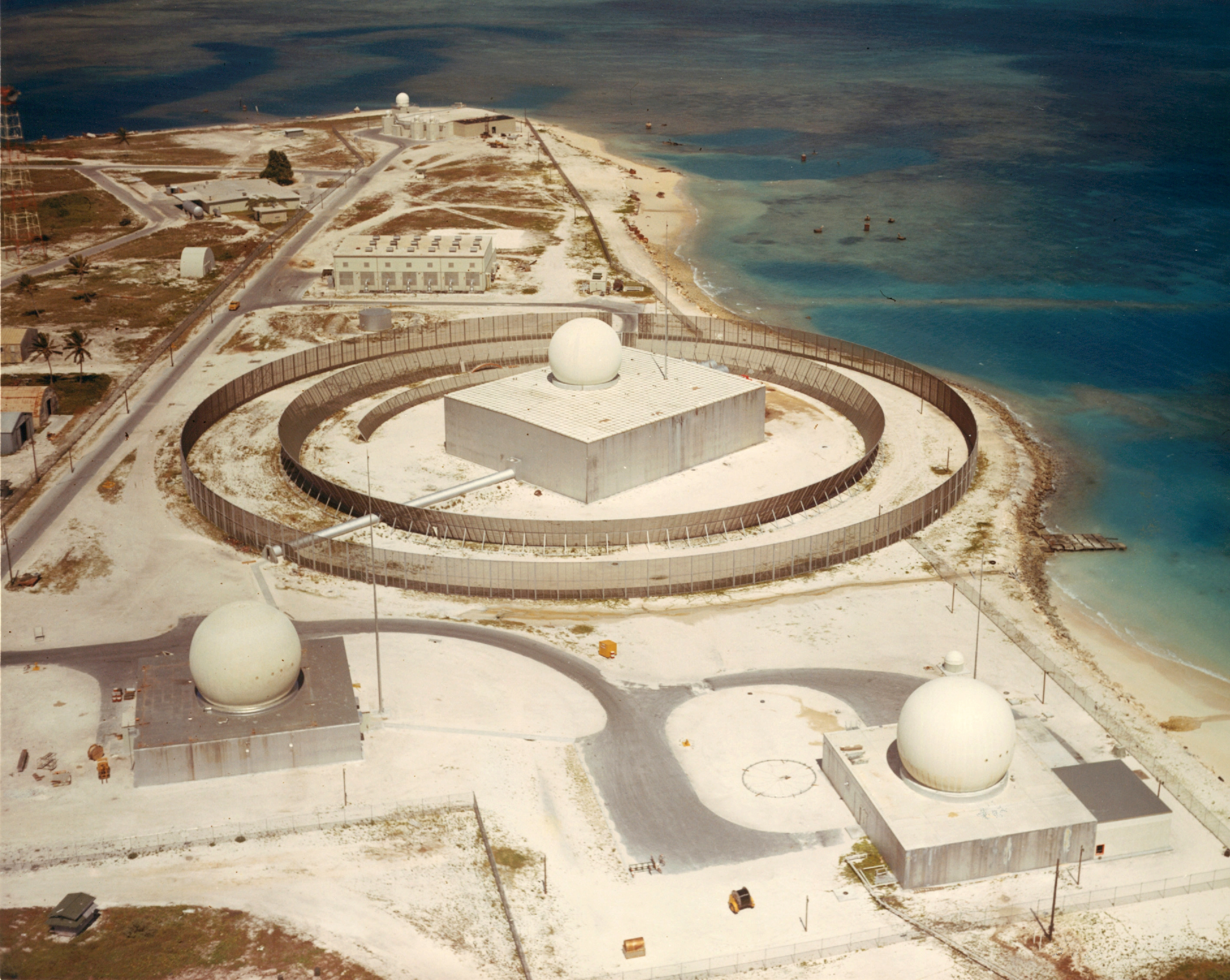
Nike Zeus tracking radars on Kwajalein in 1960s

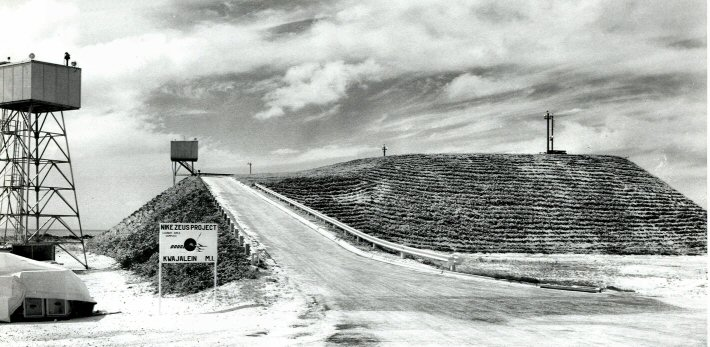
Photo of "Mount Olympus", the Nike-Zeus launcher complex on Kwajalein Island. The built-up hill allowed full-sized Zeus silos to be built into land only feet above sea level.

== See also ==
- List of islands of the Marshall Islands
- US Naval Advance Bases
- World War II United States Merchant Navy
