= Naval Base Kwajalein =

Main World War II Naval Base in Marshall Islands

- Naval Base Kwajalein in the Marshall Islands Naval Base Kwajalein (Pacific Ocean)

Geography
- Location: North Pacific Ocean
- Coordinates: 8.732°N 167.734°E

Additional information
- Time zone: MHT (UTC+12)

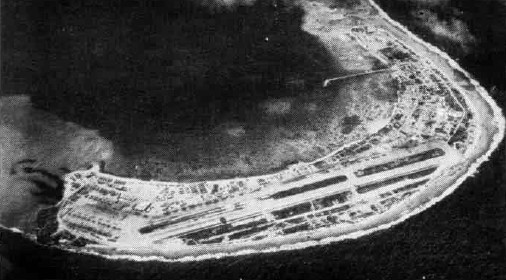
NAS Kwajalein

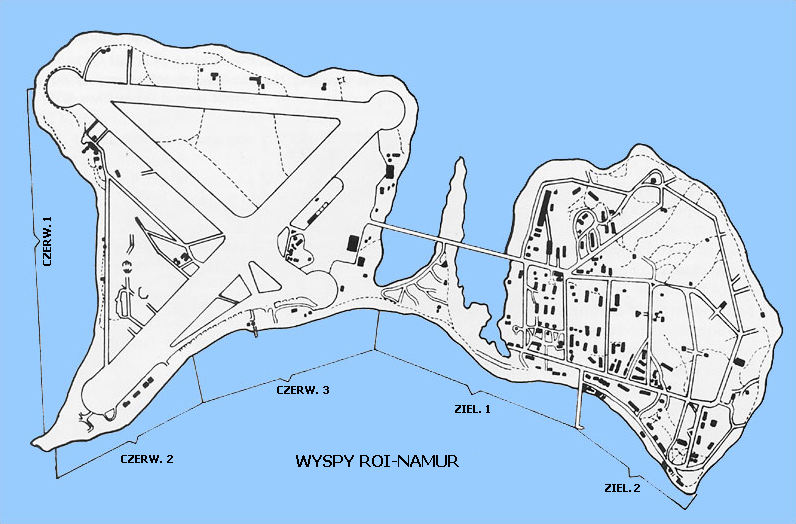
Map Roi-Namur

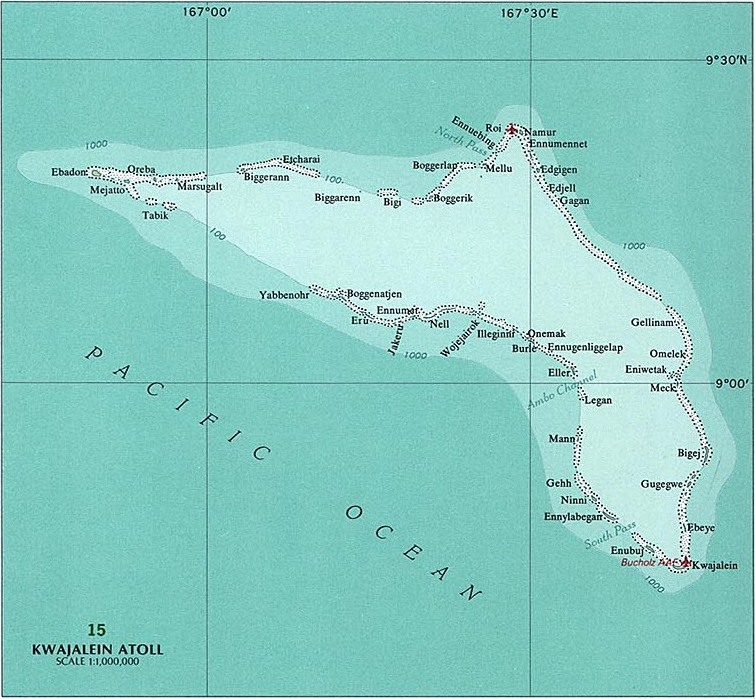
Map Kwajalein Atoll

Naval Base Kwajalein was a United States Navy base built on Kwajalein Atoll, in the Marshall Islands to support the World War II efforts in the Pacific War. The base was built after the Battle of Kwajalein ended 3 February 1944. The US Navy built airfields, a seaport and a craft repair depot on the captured islands. The base was part of the vast Naval Base Marshall Islands.

== History ==
The US Armed Forces planned and carried out Operation Flintlock on 31 January 1944 in the amphibious landings on Kwajalein. The United States Marine Corps took Kwajalein by 4 February 1944. On 4 February 1944 the US Navy's Seabees built Kwajalein into a major base and staging area for future operations. On Kwajalein the Seabee built an airfield, the Kwajalein Airfield. The US Navy and United States Army Air Forces operated out of the airfield. US Navy supported the Marines unit VMB-613 (Marine Bombing Squadron) that operated PBJ, the US Navy's version of the North American B-25 Mitchell. Unit VMO-115 (Marine Observation Squadron) operated Vought F4U Corsair from the base. Before the US Navy Seabees could start construction all the 121 Seabees had to remove the debris on the island, the remains of the heavy bombing done before the amphibious landing. Naval Base Kwajalein Fleet PO Box was 3233.

== Roi Island ==
On Roi Island, also called Roi-Namur as there was road causeway between Roi and Namur, the Seabees built a base. Seabees built the Roi-Namur Airfield. (Roi Airfield), later renamed Dyess Army Airfield starting 5 February. The runway was 4,300 feet long and 300 feet wide. On 13 February a new US fighter plane squadron arrived. On the same day the new airbase was bombed by Japanese bombers. The bomb dump was hit and caused a large fire. The 109th Seabees Battalion had 102 casualties and lost 75% of its supplies and 35% of it equipment. The 121st Seabees Battalion had 55 casualties. By 15 May over 100 planes were operating from the base. Attacks on Japan's bases at Wotje, Jaluit, and Truk were carried out. In the sea off the Island, scrapped planes were dumped in about 30 to 130 feet of water. The site has become an artificial reef.

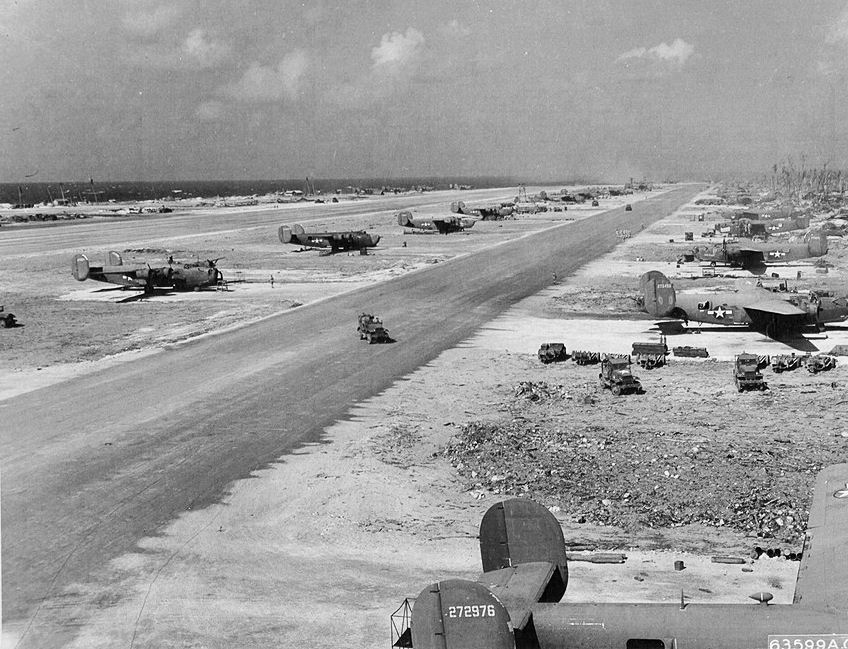
30th Bombardment Group B-24 Liberators at Kwajalein Airfield, 1944

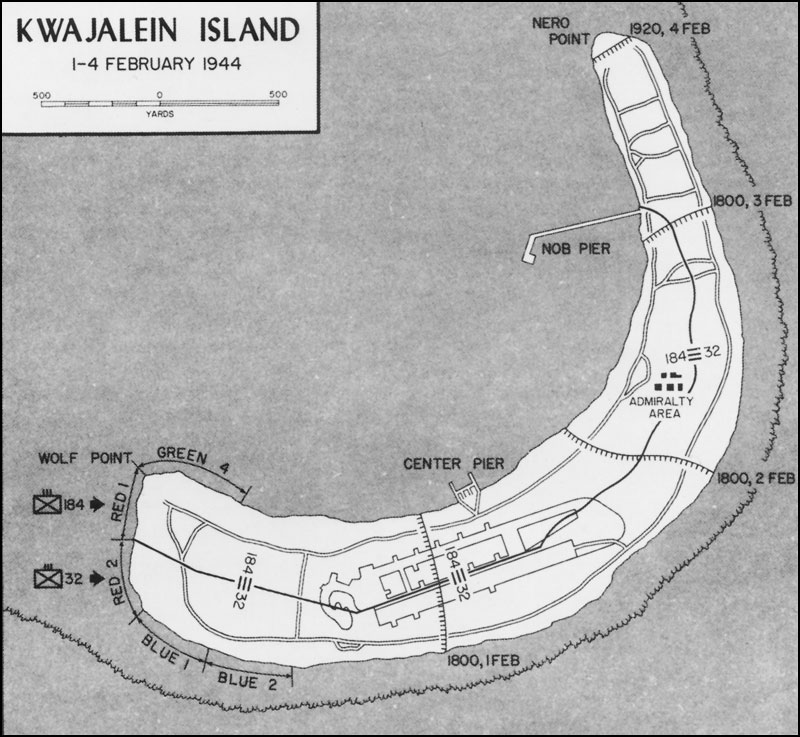
Kwajalein island map

== Namur Island ==
On Namur the 95th Seabees Battalion built a large supply depot. Some of the supplies were used to support the future Battle of the Marianas Islands. On Namur the Seabees built a 4,000 barrel fuel tank farm. To support the troops a 300-bed hospital and barracks were built from Seabees Quonset huts. To load and unload supplies the Seabees built a pontoon pier. The captured 450 by 33 feet pier was used also. These piers were not in deep water some ships had to unload to small crafts to get supplies to the piers. A small craft repair depot was installed with its own dock. Seabees built craft motor overhaul shop and a 100-ton marine railway. The marine railway was used dry dock: crash boats, picket boats, and Landing Craft Mechanized (LCM). Coral was quarried from the atoll lagoon for roads and runways. Seabees built a sawmill to lumber native woods. Some native labor was hired for clean-up and sanitation work. In June 1944 the construction battalions were replaced by CBMU 590, Construction Battalion Maintenance Unit 590.

== Ebeye ==
Kwajalein headquarters was on Ebeye Island. At Ebeye the US Navy had a headquarters and port facilities in support of Naval Base Kwajalein. The US Navy Fleet post office Box was 807. Ebeye is the most populous island of Kwajalein Atoll, no base was built on the island. The island remained for civilian use only. Ebeye was used as a Japanese seaplane base during World War II.

== Airfields ==
- Bucholz Airfield, NAS Kwajalein to the Navy
- Roi Airfield, named Dyess Army Airfield

== Post war ==
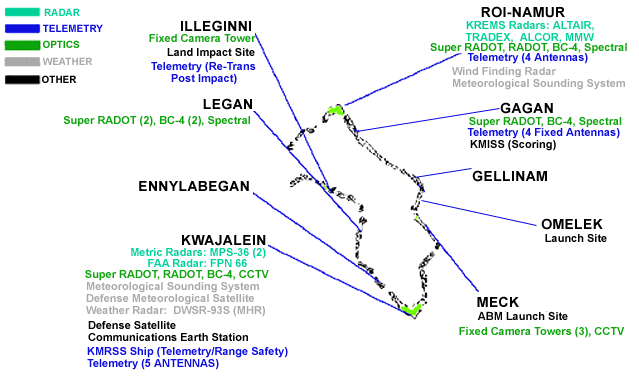
Map of Kwajalein Missile Range, now called Reagan Test Site

Unlike most US Navy bases built during the World War II, the Kwajalein and Roi-Namur bases became American military bases used as radar station and tracking station. Much of the base was abandoned. There are underwater shipwrecks and aircraft that are popular dive sites today. In 1946 the base was used for support of Operation Crossroads, the start of a series of nuclear tests at the Marshall island atolls of Bikini Atoll and Enewetak Atoll.

At the end of the war, the Marshall Islands came under the control of the United States as part of the Trust Territory of the Pacific Islands until the independence of the Marshall Islands in 1986. Marshall Islands were given self-government on 1 May 1979. Compact of Free Association was make between the Marshall Islands and United States on 21 October 1986. These close associations United States dollar and English are used in the Marshall Islands. The Compact of Free Association agrees that US is responsible the defense of the Marshall Islands. The compact gives the Marshall Islands Marshallese) the right to emigrate, without a visa, to the United States .

The vast Kwajalein Missile Range was built Marshall Islands during the Cold War.

== Gallery ==
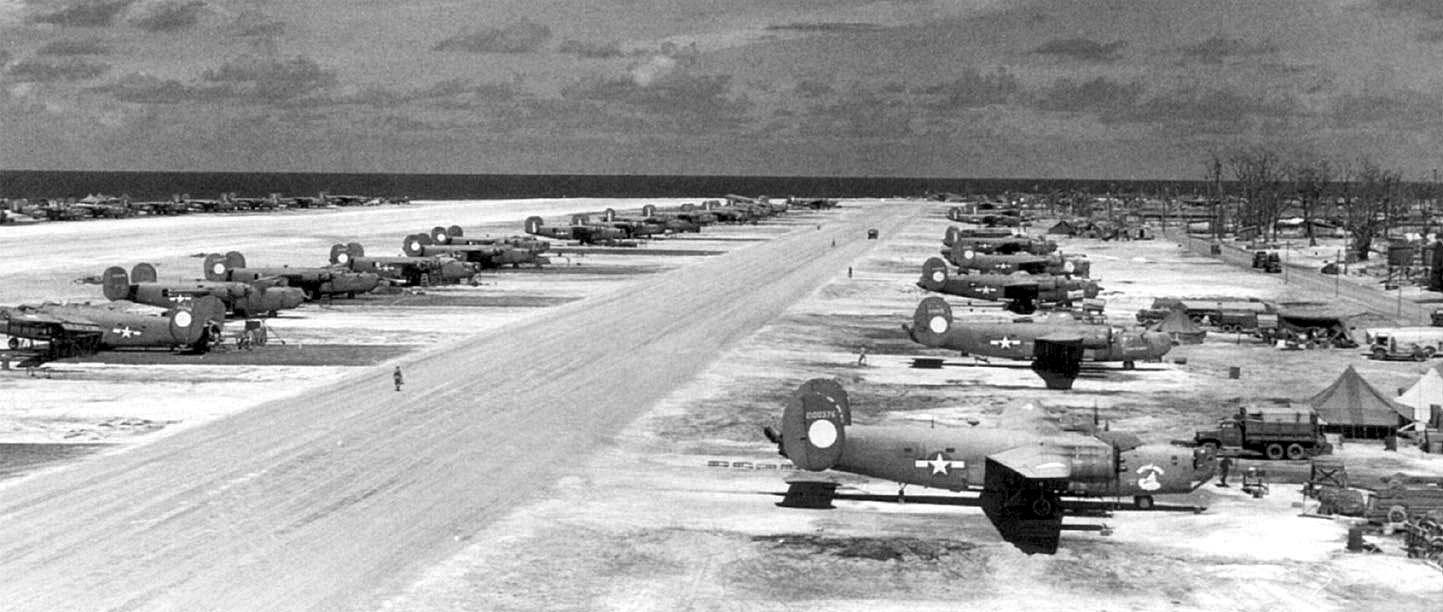
Consolidated B-24 Liberator on Kwajalein in June 1944

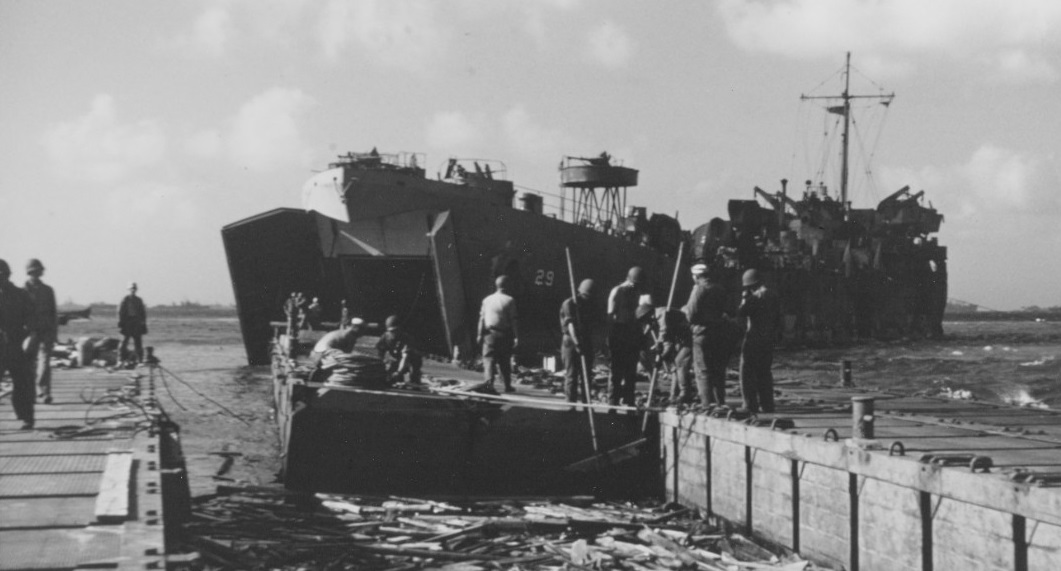
USS LST-29 at Kwajalein causeway February 1944

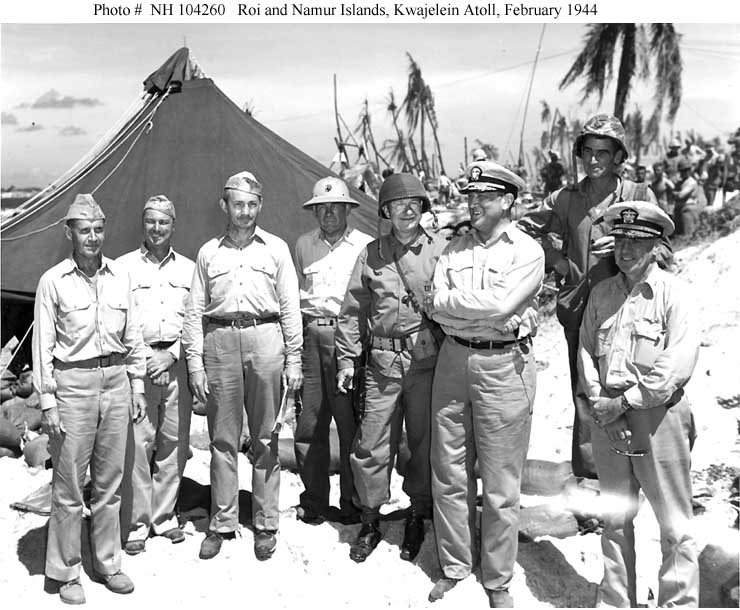
Kwajalein February 1944

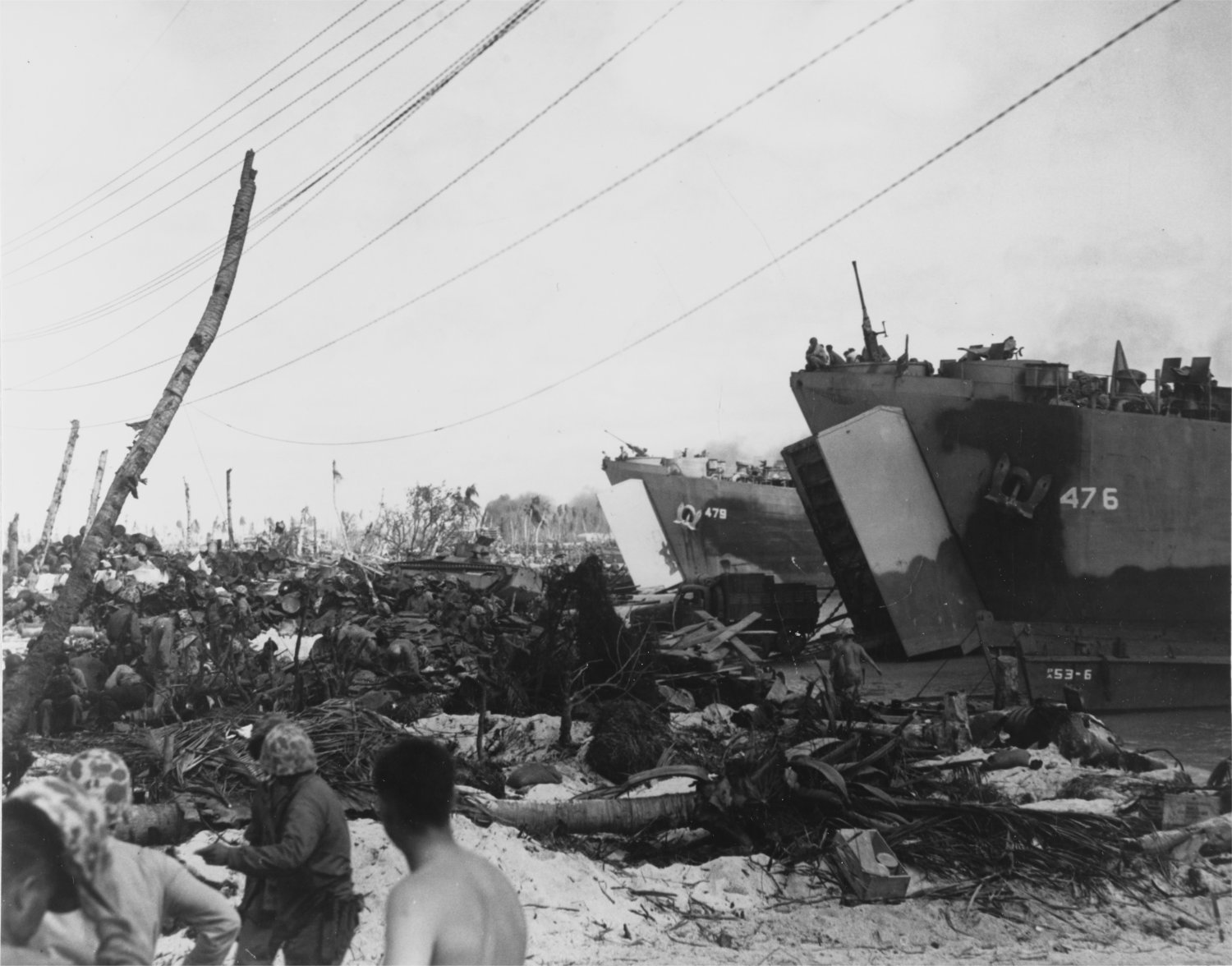
US Navy ship USS LST-476 and USS LST-479 land vehicles and supplies at Roi Island in February 1944

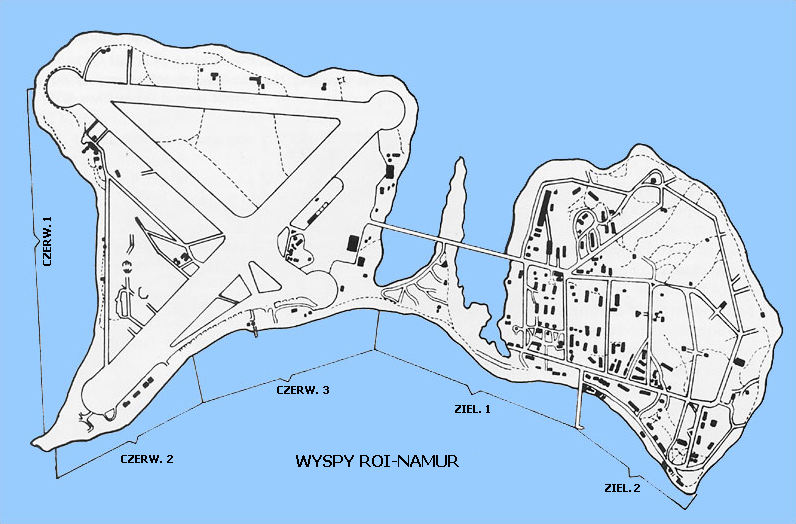
Map of Roi-Namur during World War II. The causeway is roughly centered.

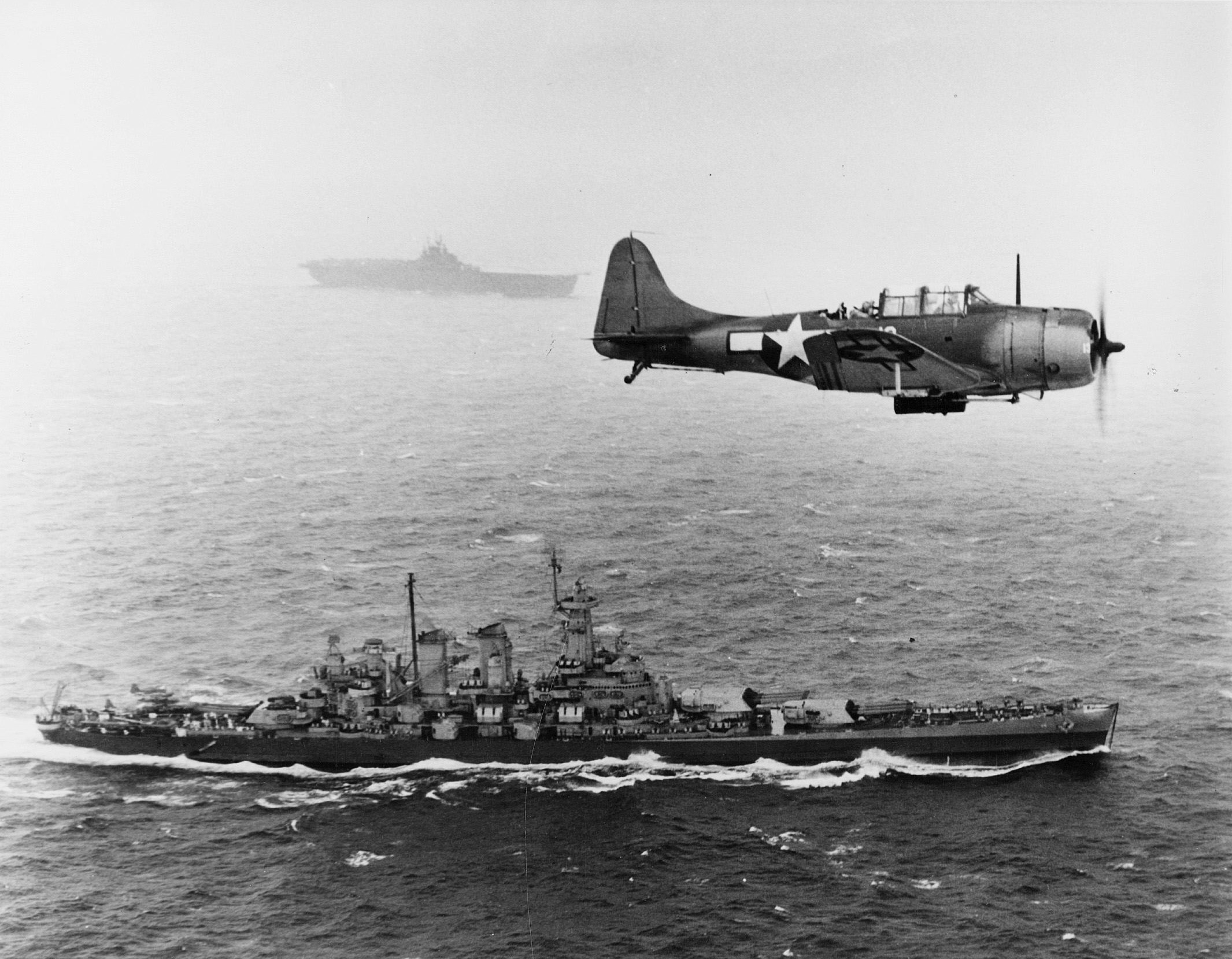
An SBD Dauntless flies patrol over USS Washington and USS Lexington during the Marshall islands campaign.

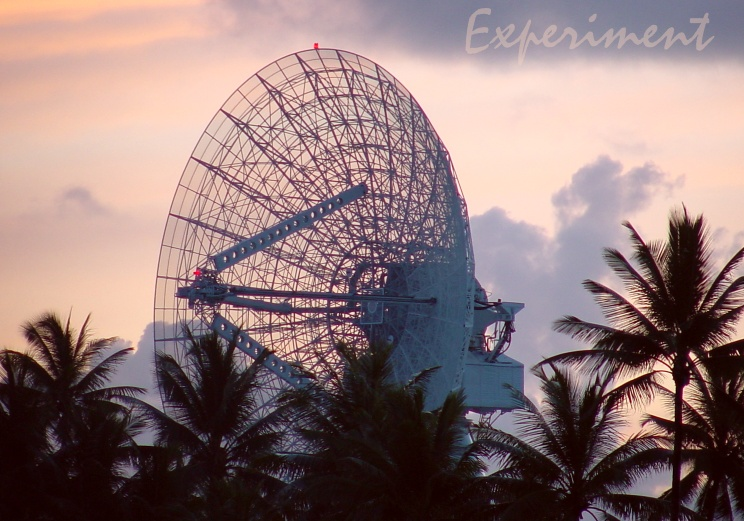
ALTAIR radar at Roi-Namur today

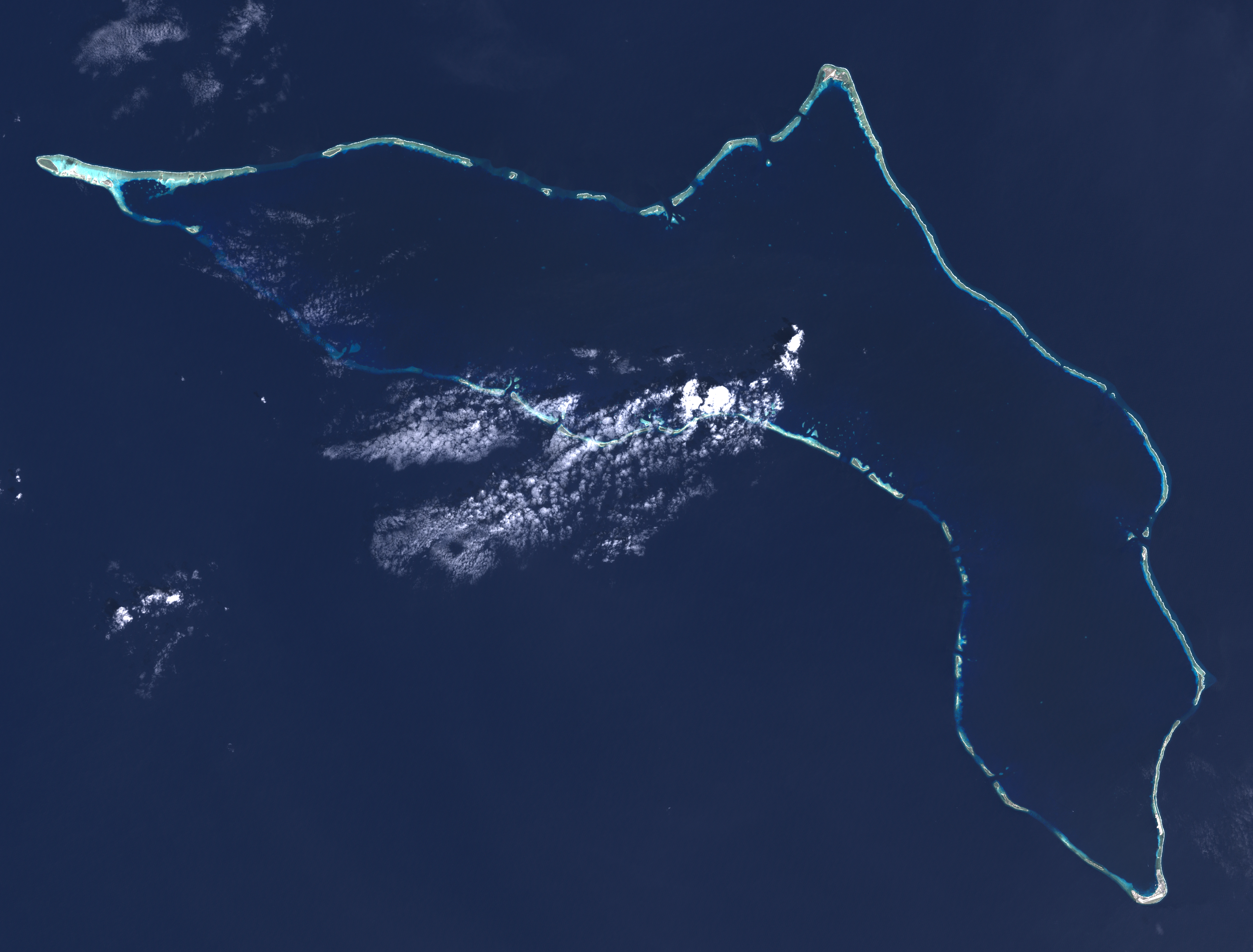
File:Kwajalein Atoll in 2003 by Landsat 7

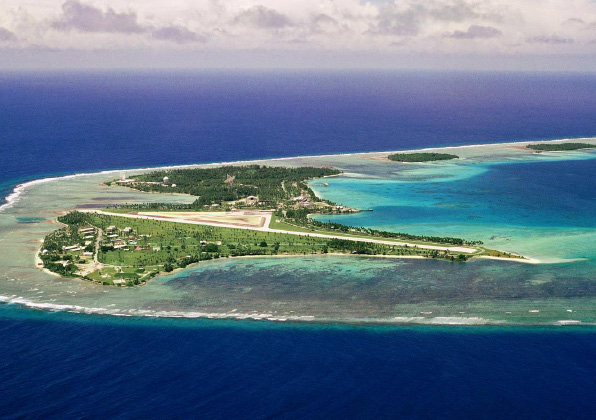
Dyess Army Airfield

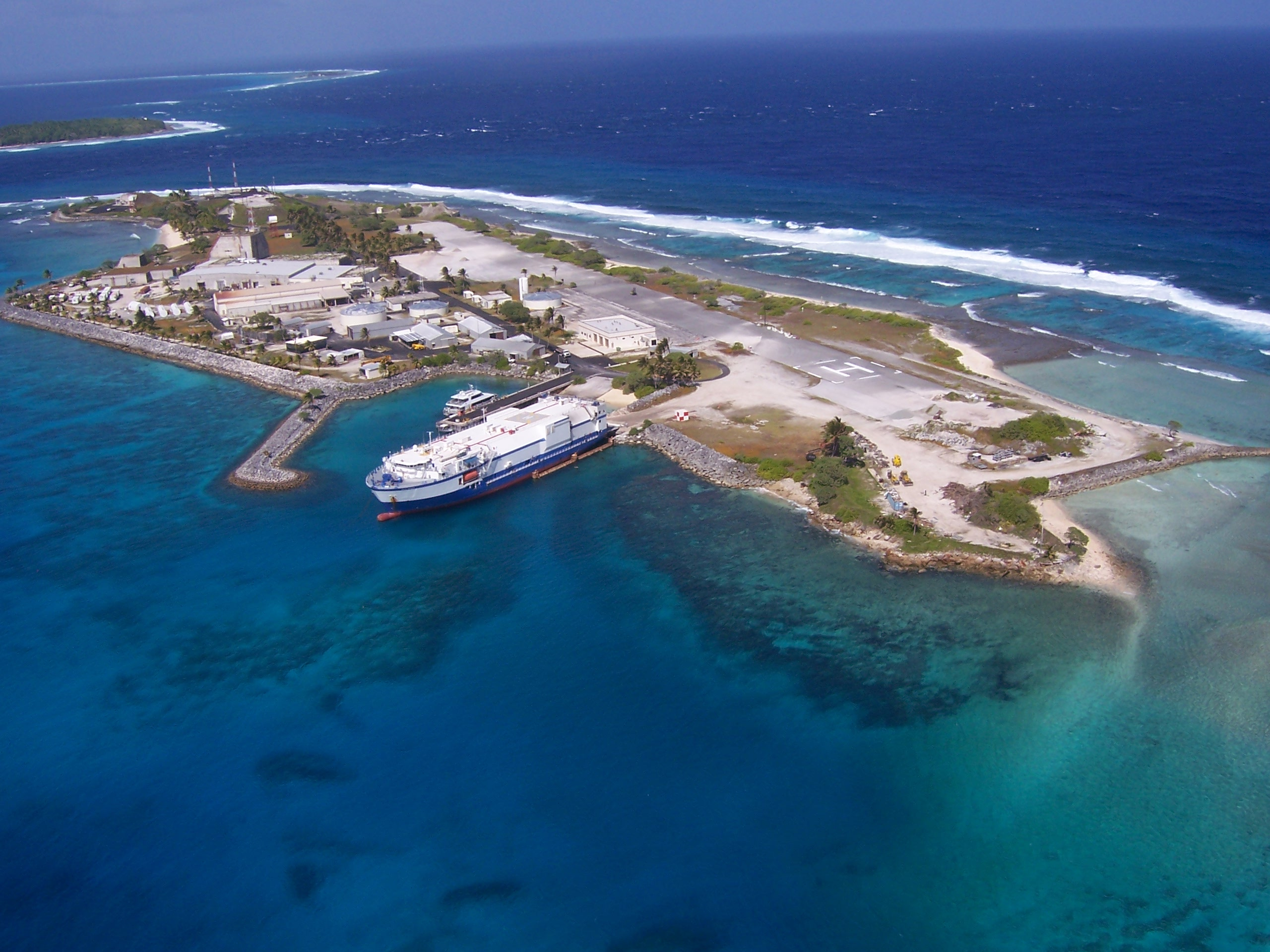
Meck Island part of Kwajalein Missile Range

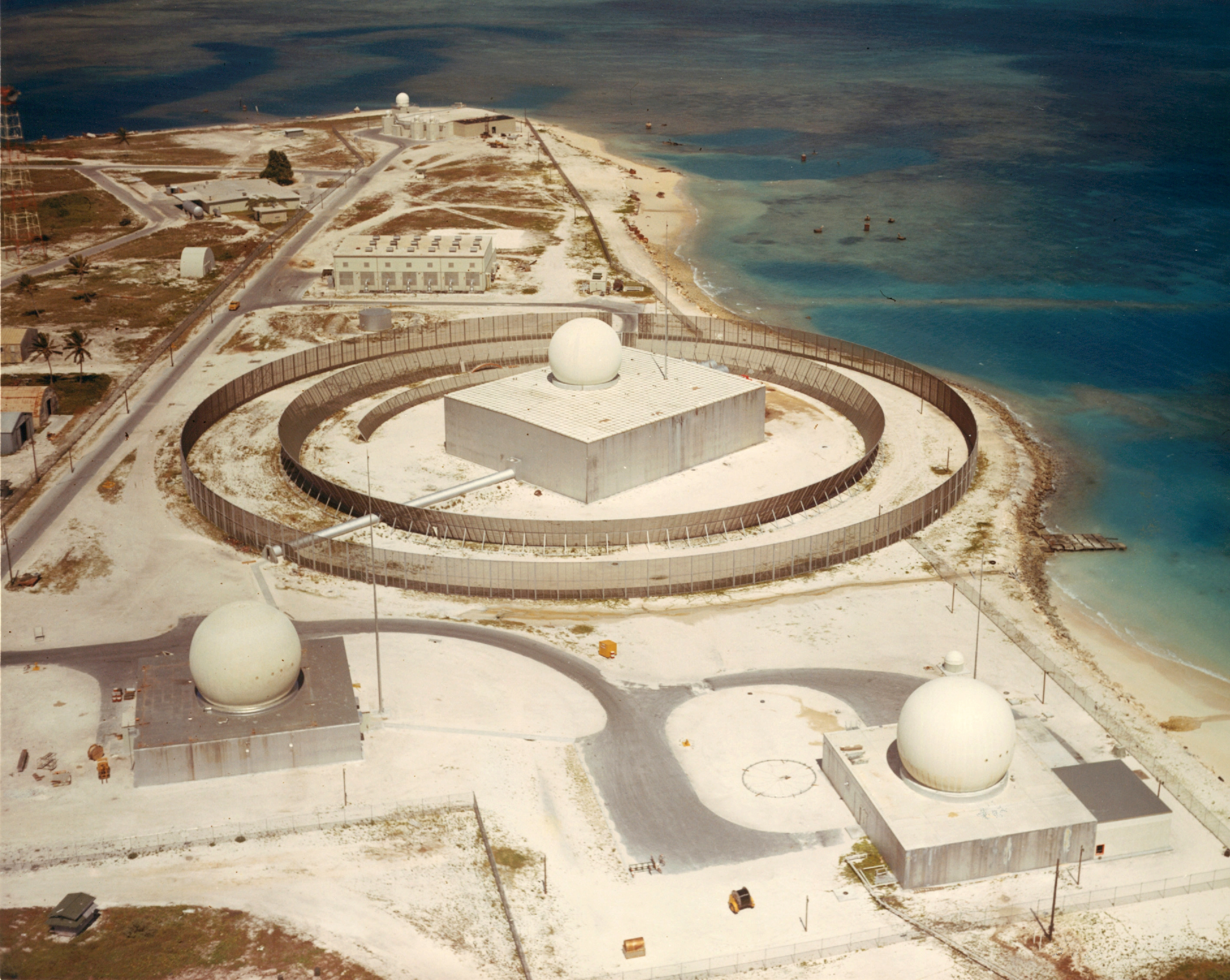
Nike Zeus tracking radars on Kwajalein in 1960s

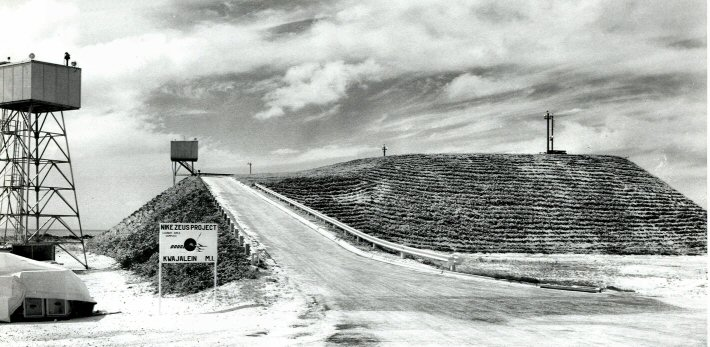
Photo of "Mount Olympus", the Nike-Zeus launcher complex on Kwajalein Island. The built-up hill allowed full-sized Zeus silos to be built into land only feet above sea level.

== See also ==
- List of islands of the Marshall Islands
- US Naval Advance Bases
- Gilbert Islands naval order of battle
- World War II United States Merchant Navy
- 3d Antiaircraft Artillery Battalion (Composite)
