= ARPA Long-Range Tracking And Instrumentation Radar =

Radar station in Marshall Islands

ARPA Long-Range Tracking And Instrumentation Radar (ALTAIR)
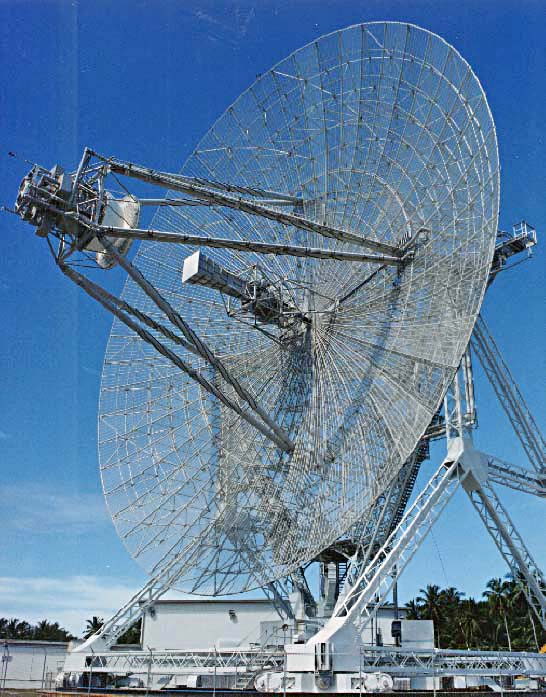
- Cassegrain antenna of ALTAIR
- Country of origin: United States
- Designer: MIT Lincoln Laboratory
- Introduced: 1969; 57 years ago
- Frequency: 162 and 422 MHz (1.851 and 0.710 m)
- PRF: 300 pps
- Beamwidth: 1.1° (UHF); 2.8° (VHF)
- Pulsewidth: 80 μsec
- Range: 42,000 km (26,000 mi)
- Diameter: 45.7 m (150 ft)
- Precision: 20 m (66 ft)
- Power: 5 MW

ALTAIR (ARPA Long-Range Tracking And Instrumentation Radar) is a radar tracking station on Roi-Namur island in the north part of the Kwajalein atoll in the Marshall Islands. It is a high-sensitivity, wide-bandwidth, coherent, instrumentation and tracking radar that is capable of collecting precise measurements on small targets at long-ranges. ALTAIR supports several operating modes, including tracking and signature collection at VHF and UHF. It is part of a network of contributing radar sensors that perform deep-space tracking.

The antenna uses a steerable 150-ft dish (46-m-diameter) and employs a focal point VHF feed and multimode Cassegrain UHF feed in conjunction with a frequency selective sub-reflector (5.5 m diameter).

The radar became operational in 1969. The original task was to detect and track intercontinental ballistic missiles. It is currently used to measure satellite orbits and meteor echoes in low-Earth orbit, and to observe ionospheric irregularities and background densities.
