= Dyess Army Airfield =

Airport on Roi Island, Kwajalein Atoll, Marshall Islands

- Part of Ronald Reagan Ballistic Missile Defense Test Site
- Roi-Namur, Kwajalein Atoll in Marshall Islands
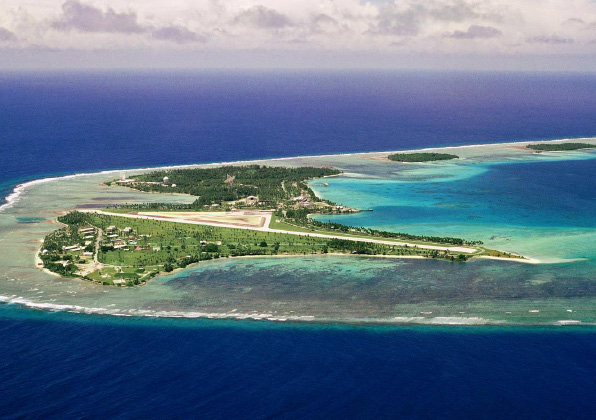

Site information
- Owner: United States Army

Location
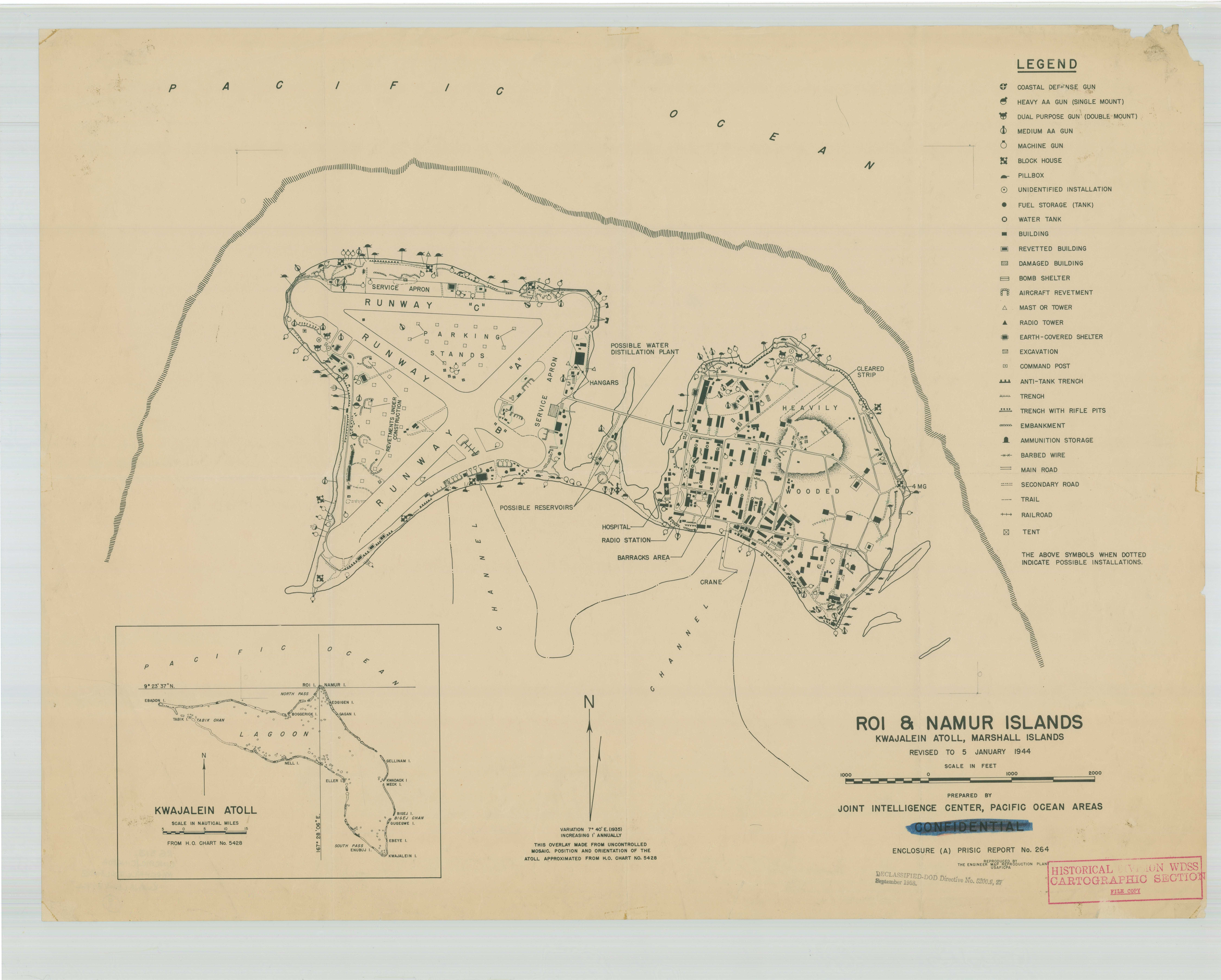
- The installation on a 1944 map
- The installation on a 1944 map Dyess AAF (North Pacific )
- Coordinates: 09°23′49″N 167°28′15″E

Airfield information
- Identifiers: ICAO: PKRO, FAA LID: ROI
- Elevation: 10 feet (3 m) AMSL
Runways
Direction	Length and surface
04/22	4,499 feet (1,371 m) Paved

Dyess Army Airfield (ICAO: PKRO, FAA LID: ROI, also known as Freeflight International Airport) is a military airfield on Roi-Namur, Kwajalein Atoll, Marshall Islands. It is owned by the United States Army. Approximately 60 U.S. personnel reside on the base, with an additional 100 personnel commuting from Bucholz Army Airfield daily by plane.

== History ==
When the Japanese took control of the island during World War II they built an airfield that took the form of the number "4." After the 4th Marine Division landed the Seabees of 3rd Battalion, 20th Marines and the 109th Naval Construction Battalion made the field operational again. The Japanese designated the runways A, B, and C, with A being the vertical leg, B being the diagonal and C intersecting at a right angle to A. The Seabees of the Naval Base Kwajalein repaired runways A and C. Today the only runway that remains is A.

On September 19, 1950, the Marshall Islands' worst aviation accident happened near Dyess. A Douglas R5D-3 (56496) of the US Navy crashed into the Pacific shortly after takeoff from runway 07 on what was supposed to be a flight to Tokyo, killing all 26 onboard.

== Facilities ==
Dyess Army Airfield is at an elevation of 10 feet (3 m) above mean sea level. The runway is designated 04/22 with an asphalt surface measuring 4,499 by 150 feet (1,371 x 45.5 m).
