= Roi-Namur =

- Roi–Namur Battlefield
- U.S. National Register of Historic Places
- U.S. National Historic Landmark District
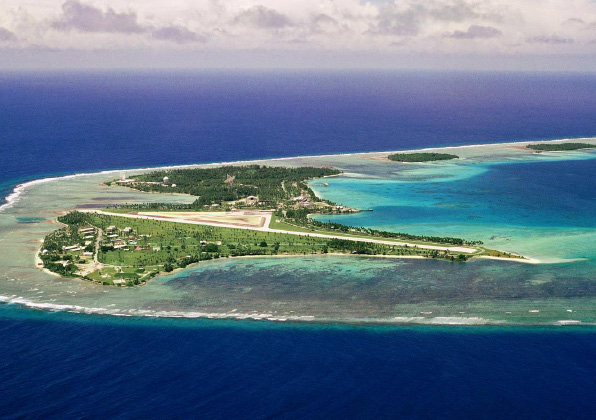
- Roi-Namur

- Location within Marshall Islands
- Location: Kwajalein Missile Range, Kwajalein Atoll
- Coordinates: 9°23′46″N 167°28′33″E
- Built: 1944
- NRHP reference No.: 85001758

Significant dates
- Added to NRHP: February 4, 1985
- Designated NHLD: February 4, 1985

Roi-Namur (/ˌrɔɪ nəˈmʊər/ roy nə-MOOR) is an island in the north part of the Kwajalein Atoll in the Marshall Islands. Today, the island is a major part of the Ronald Reagan Ballistic Missile Defense Test Site, hosting several radar systems used for tracking and characterizing missile reentry vehicles (RV) and their penetration aids (penaids).

Roi-Namur is a military base of the United States, leased from the Republic of the Marshall Islands; however, defense of the Marshall Islands is the responsibility of the United States through the Compact of Free Association.

In 2024, a flooding event caused by wave overtopping made national news in the United States, with dramatic footage of water bursting through a door.

== Etymology ==
The name of the island was coined after the then-separate islands Roi and Namur. Roi originates from the Marshallese word Ruot, while Namur originates from the Marshallese word Nim̧ur.

The highest point on the island is called Mount Olympus, and is a man-made mound of 17.5 meters elevation.

== History ==
Germany annexed the Marshall Islands in 1885 but did not place government officials on the islands until 1906, leaving island affairs to a group of German trading companies. During World War I, the Japanese seized the Marshall Islands, and later, under the Treaty of Versailles, Japan formally took over operations under the League of Nations mandate. The Japanese colonized the islands extensively, developing and fortifying large bases on many of the islands, eventually using them to aid in their Pacific invasion in December 1941. The Pacific War between the United States eventually reached the Marshall Islands in 1944.

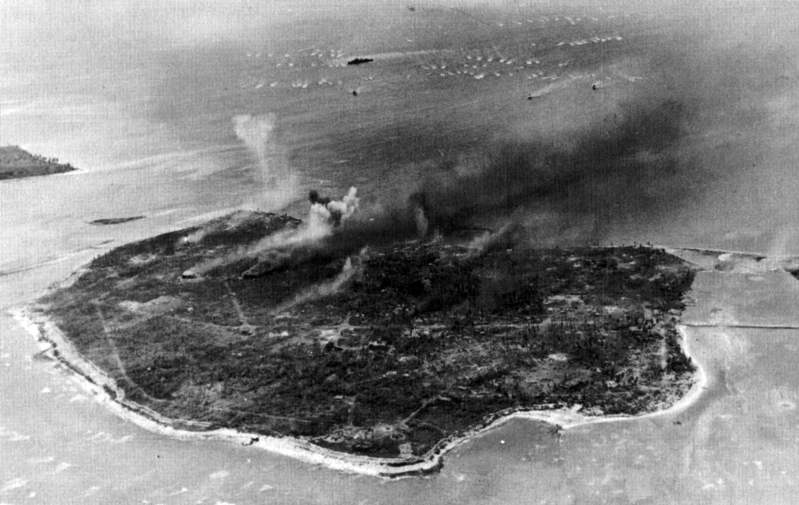
Aerial view of the landings, February 1944

The fortified Roi-Namur was the target of the U.S. 4th Marine Division landing operation during the Battle of Kwajalein in February 1944, with a part of the island being blown up in an explosion that caused 120 American casualties. Marine Corps officers Aquilla J. Dyess and John V. Power both earned posthumous Medals of Honor. A total of 313 Americans were killed and 502 wounded in the operation, with the Japanese garrison of an estimated 3,563 men being killed.

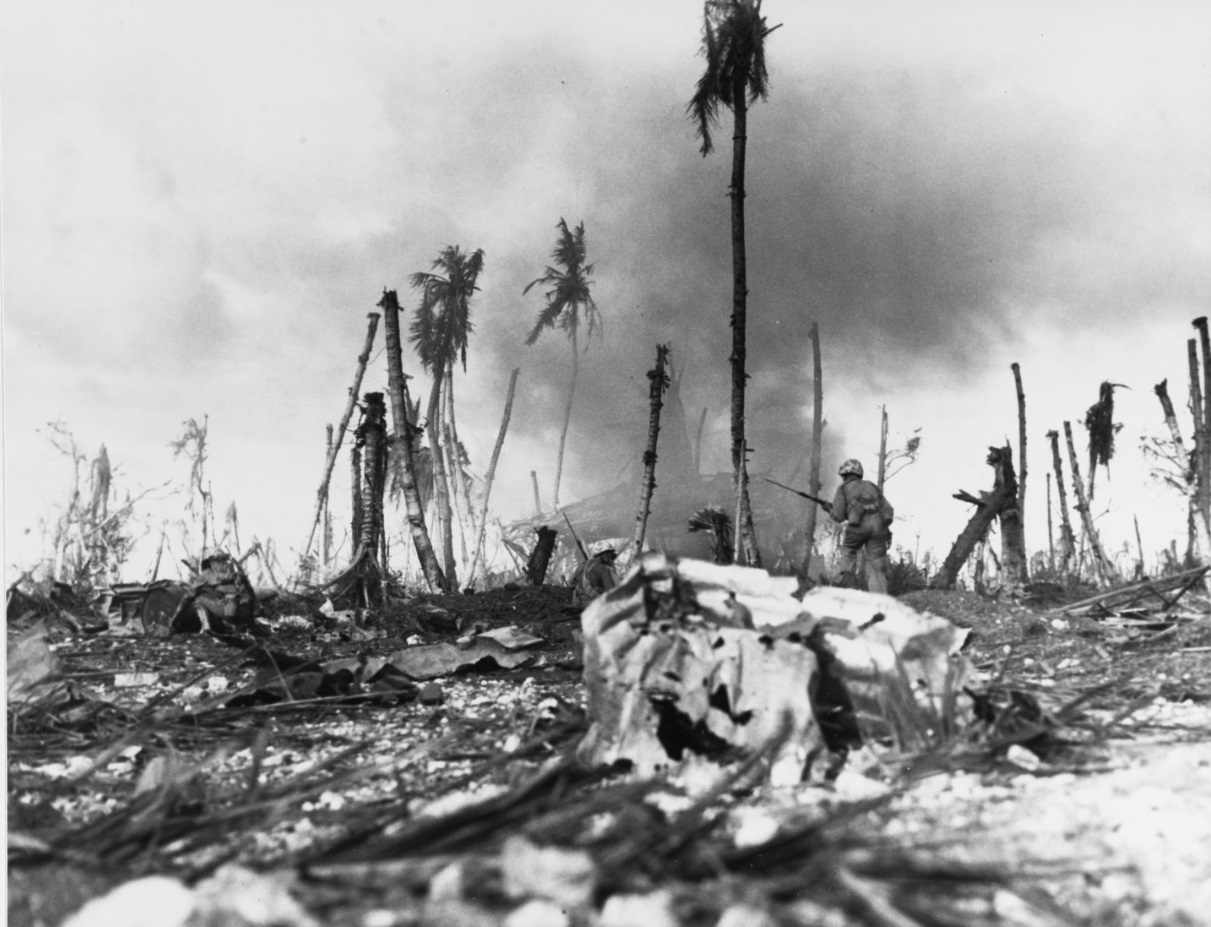
Fighting on Namur Island, February 1, 1944

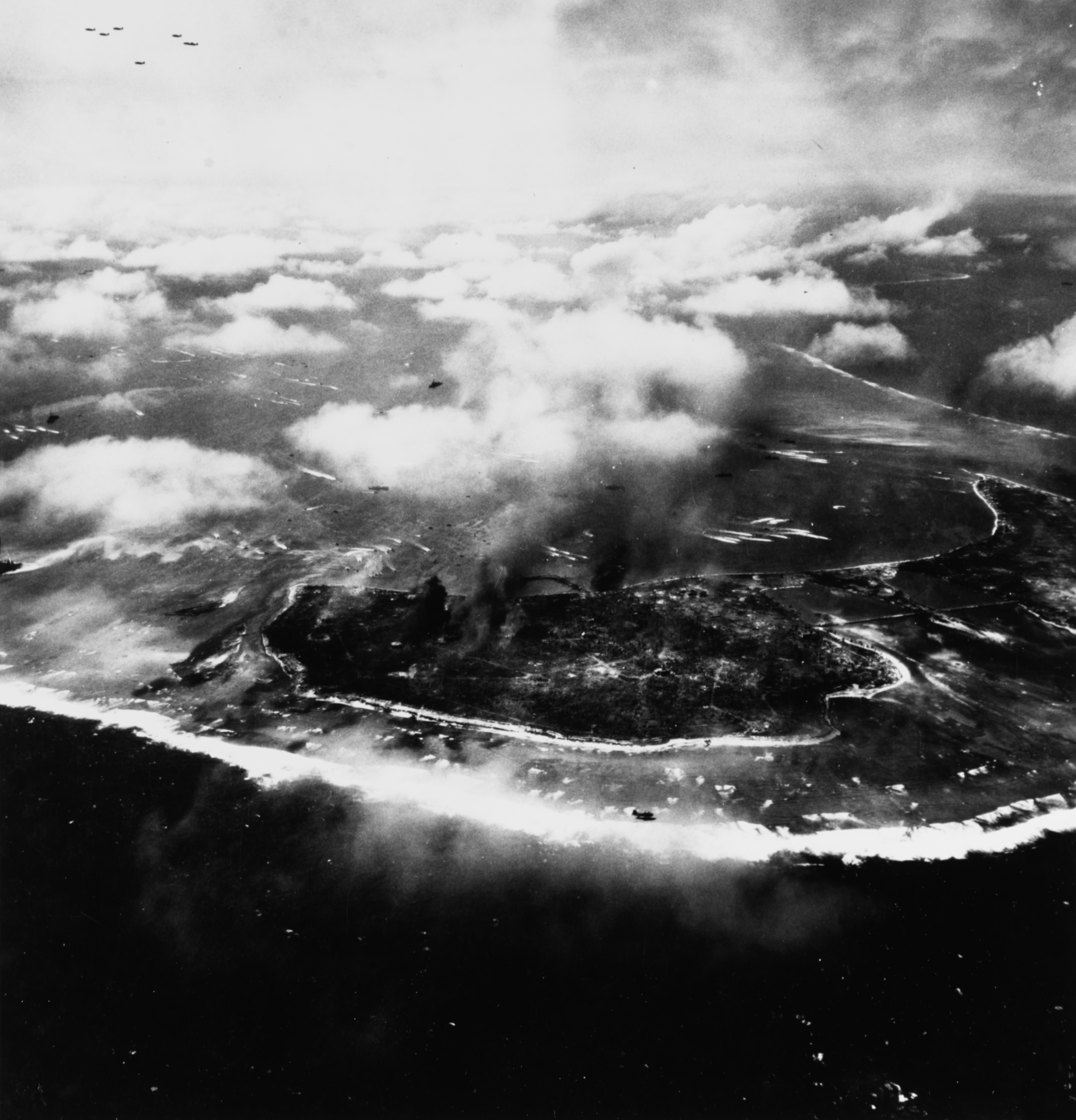
Another view of landings on Roi-Namur, February 1944

During the Japanese occupation, the two islands, (Roi to the west, and Namur to the east) were connected by a narrow strip of land and a causeway. After American occupation, US Navy Seabees filled the remaining area between the islands by December 1944. The two now joined islands are presently called Roi-Namur, having a total area of about one square mile.

Roi-Namur was selected by DARPA as a host site for a series of radar experiments under the Project Defender umbrella, and Project PRESS. These experiments intended to use radar as a means to distinguish an enemy missile reentry vehicle (RV) from its penetration aids by examination of their size, shape, and velocity, as well as examining the wake they left in the upper atmosphere. By building on Roi-Namur, they were able to examine the test shots used by the US Army's Nike-X program installed on Kwajalein Island and Meck Island further to the south.

The island was flooded in December 2008 by a “massive wave” which swamped coastal roads. A similar flood from one or more rogue waves or sneaker wave damaged buildings and swamped runways on 20 January 2024. The January 2024 event was a popular clip on social media and news sites in the United States. The Army embarked a cleanup operation called Operation Roi Recovery after the inundation wave on Roi-Namur.

== Today ==
Roi-Namur is home to about 120 American and Marshallese employees of the Reagan Test Site.

The Roi section of the island contains the main housing area, holding the retail and recreation facilities. Activities on Roi-Namur range from a tennis court, saltwater swimming pool, scuba club, volleyball, and basketball court. Roi holds the Freeflight International Airport (Marshall Islands) with one runway for small planes commuting from Kwajalein. Additionally, Marshallese daytime workers come via ferry from the island of Enniburr.

The Namur section is home to the ALCOR, ALTAIR, MMW and TRADEX radar tracking stations.

There is a small rocket launch facility (known as Speedball) on Roi-Namur, which usually launches sounding rockets that ascend beyond the atmosphere but have a short range.

There are crumbling remnants of Japanese blockhouses and pillboxes around Roi-Namur.

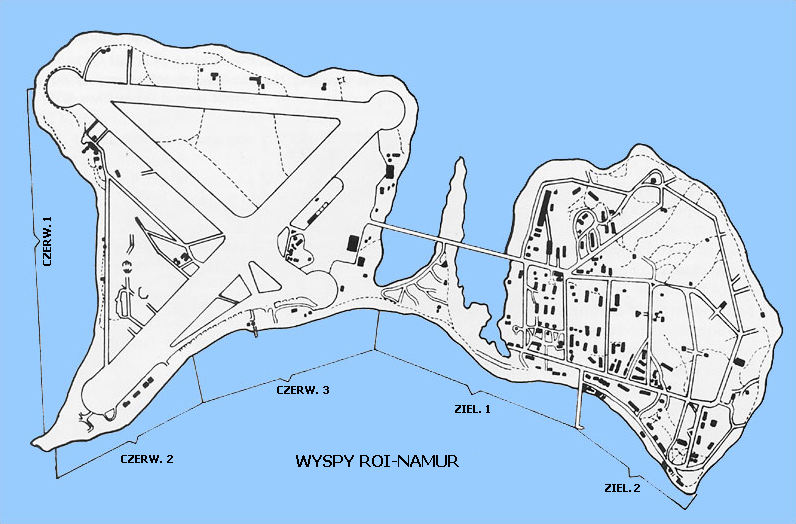
Map of Roi-Namur during World War II. The causeway is roughly centered.

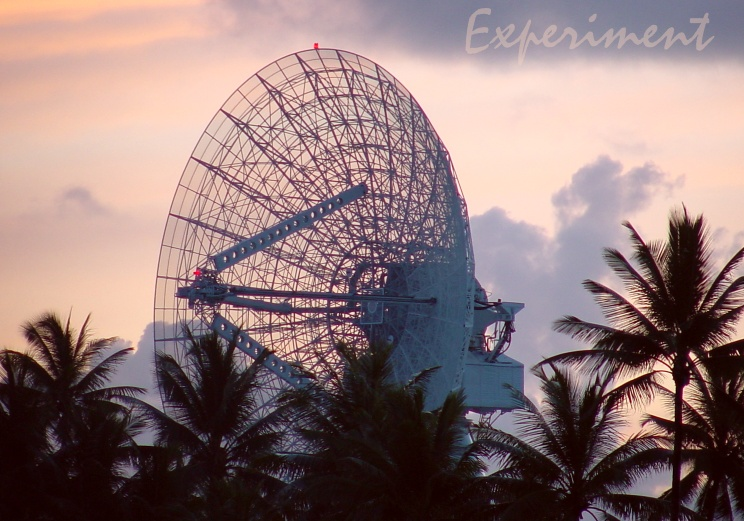
ALTAIR radar

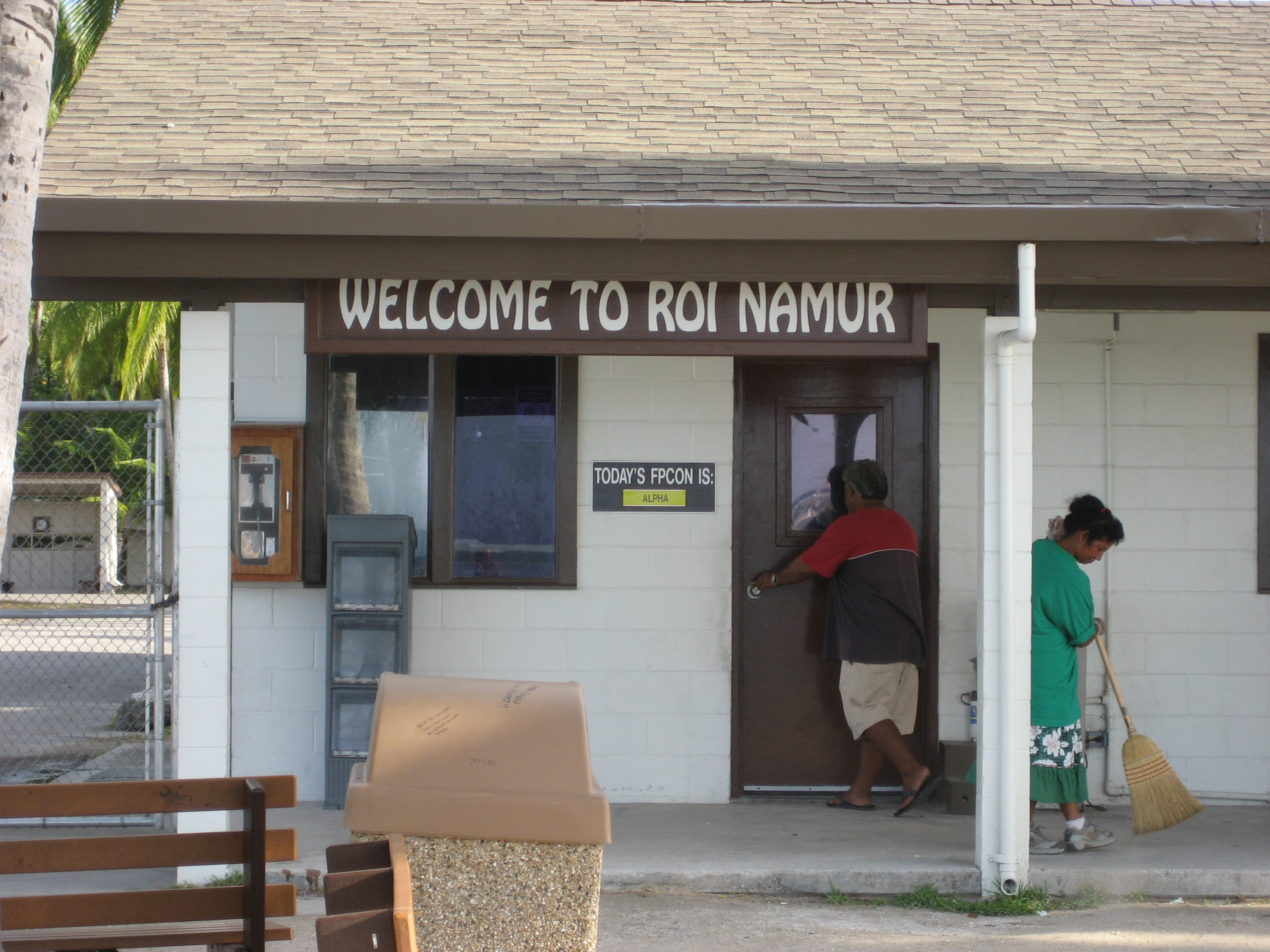
Welcome sign for Docks Office

== See also ==
- List of United States National Historic Landmarks in United States commonwealths and territories, associated states, and foreign states
- National Register of Historic Places listings in the Marshall Islands
