= USS LST-29 =

1943 LST-1-class tank landing ship

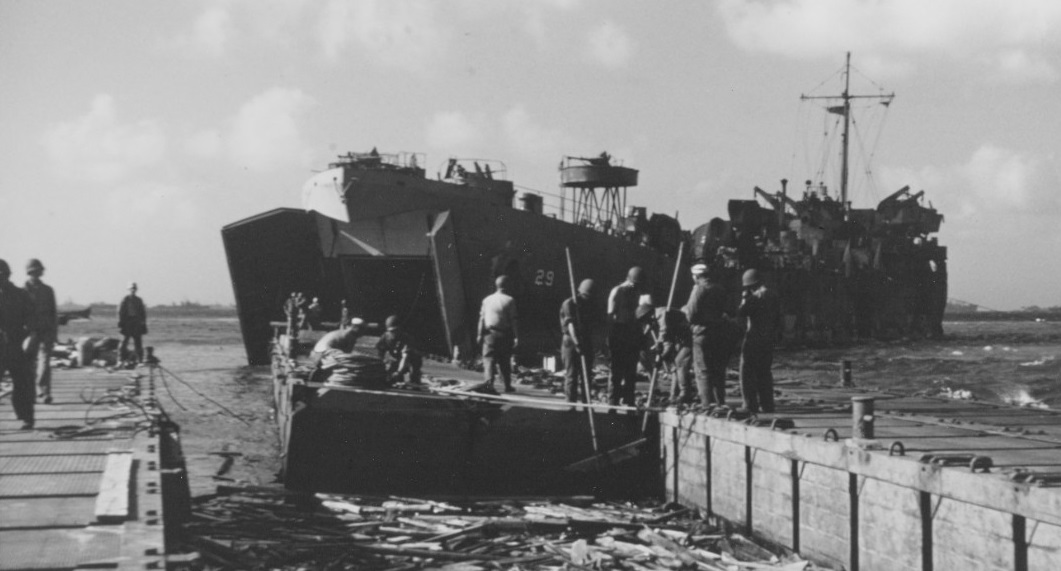
- USS LST-29 approaches a pontoon causeway at Kwajalein, soon after the Island's capture in February 1944.

History

United States
- Name: LST-29
- Builder: Dravo Corporation, Pittsburgh, Pennsylvania
- Laid down: 8 January 1943
- Launched: 17 May 1943
- Sponsored by: Mrs. C. F. Lockton
- Commissioned: 10 July 1943
- Decommissioned: 11 March 1946
- Stricken: 8 May 1946
- Identification: Hull symbol: LST-29; Code letters: NFFQ
- Honors and awards: 4 × battle stars
- Fate: Sold, 17 June 1946

General characteristics
- Type: LST-1-class tank landing ship
- Displacement: 4,080 long tons (4,145 t) full load; 2,160 long tons (2,190 t) landing
- Length: 328 ft (100 m) oa
- Beam: 50 ft (15 m)
- Draft: Full load: 8 ft 2 in (2.49 m) forward; 14 ft 1 in (4.29 m) aft; Landing at 2,160 t: 3 ft 11 in (1.19 m) forward; 9 ft 10 in (3.00 m) aft
- Installed power: 2 × 900 hp (670 kW) Electro-Motive Diesel 12-567A diesel engines; 1,700 shp (1,300 kW)
- Propulsion: 1 × Falk main reduction gears; 2 × Propellers
- Speed: 12 kn (22 km/h; 14 mph)
- Range: 24,000 nmi (44,000 km; 28,000 mi) at 9 kn (17 km/h; 10 mph) while displacing 3,960 long tons (4,024 t)
- Boats & landing craft carried: 2 or 6 x LCVPs
- Capacity: 2,100 tons oceangoing maximum; 350 tons main deckload
- Troops: 16 officers, 147 enlisted men
- Complement: 13 officers, 104 enlisted men
- Armament: Varied, ultimate armament; 2 × twin 40 mm (1.57 in) Bofors guns; 4 × single 40 mm Bofors guns; 12 × 20 mm (0.79 in) Oerlikon cannons

Service record
- Part of: LST Flotilla 3
- Operations: Gilbert Islands operation; Battle of Tarawa (28 November–8 December 1943); Marshall Islands operation; Occupation of Kwajalein and Majuro Atolls (31 January–8 February 1944); Occupation of Eniwetok Atoll (17 February–2 March 1944); Marianas operation; Capture and occupation of Guam (21 July–5 August 1944); Assault and occupation of Okinawa Gunto (3–22 May 1945)
- Awards: American Campaign Medal; Asiatic–Pacific Campaign Medal; World War II Victory Medal

USS LST-29 was a United States Navy LST-1-class tank landing ship used exclusively in the Asiatic-Pacific Theater during World War II. Like many of her class, she was not named and is properly referred to by her hull designation.

== Construction ==
LST-29 was laid down on 8 January 1943, at Pittsburgh, Pennsylvania, by the Dravo Corporation; launched on 17 May 1943; sponsored by Mrs. C. F. Lockton; and commissioned on 10 July 1943.

== Service history ==
During World War II, LST-29 was assigned to the Asiatic-Pacific theater and participated in the following operations: the Gilbert Islands operation during the battle of Tarawa in November and December 1943; the Marshall Islands operation during the occupation of Kwajalein and Majuro Atolls in January and February 1944, and the occupation of Eniwetok Atoll in February March 1944; the Marianas operation during the capture and occupation of Guam in July and August 1944; and the assault and occupation of Okinawa Gunto in May 1945.

== Postwar career ==
LST-29 was decommissioned on 11 March 1946, and was struck from the Navy list on 8 May 1946. On 17 June 1946, she was sold to the Foss Launch & Tug Company, of Seattle, Washington.

== Awards ==
LST-29 earned four battle stars for her World War II service.

== Bibliography ==
- "LST-29". Dictionary of American Naval Fighting Ships. Naval History and Heritage Command. 30 July 2015. This article incorporates text from this source, which is in the public domain.
- "USS LST-29". NavSource. 4 July 2014.
