= Aristide (name) =

Aristide is a name of French origin with Greek roots, from Ἀριστείδης m (Aristeídēs)

People with the name include:

== People ==
=== People with the first name Aristide ===
==== A ====
- Aristide Elphonso Peter Albert (1853–1910), also known as A. E. P. Albert, American newspaper editor, physician, and minister

==== B ====
- Aristide Bahin (born 1987), Ivorian footballer
- Aristide Bancé (born 1984), Burkinabé footballer
- Aristide Beaugrand-Champagne (1876–1950), Canadian landscape architect and architect
- Aristide Blais (1875–1964), Canadian physician and senator
- Aristide Blank (1883–1960), (also spelled Blanc or Blanck), Romanian financier, economist, arts patron and playwright
- Aristide Boucicaut (1810–1877), French entrepreneur, founder of Le Bon Marché
- Aristide Briand (1862–1932), French statesman and Prime Minister
- Aristide Bruant (1851–1925), French cabaret singer, comedian, and nightclub owner

==== C ====
- Aristide Caradja (1861–1955), Romanian entomologist and lawyer
- Aristide Cavaillé-Coll (1811–1899), French organ builder
- Aristide Cavallari (1849–1914), Cardinal of the Roman Catholic Church and Patriarch of Venice
- Aristide Berto Cianfarani (1895–1960), Italian-born American sculptor
- Aristide Compagnoni (1910–1995), Italian cross country skier
- Aristide Coscia (1918–1979), Italian professional football player and coach
- Aristide Croisy (1840–1899), French sculptor

==== D ====
- Aristide Aubert du Petit-Thouars (1760–1798), French naval officer

==== F ====
- Aristide Farrenc (1794–1865), French flautist, musicologist and music publisher
- Aristide Frémine (1837–1897), French writer

==== G ====
- Aristide Garbini (1890–1950), Italian film actor
- Aristide Gromer (born 1908), French chess master
- Aristide Guarneri (born 1938), Italian footballer
- Aristide Guerriero (born 1986), Italian former shot putter and throwing specialist, and coach
- Aristide Gunnella (1931–2025), Italian politician

==== H ====
- Aristide Hignard (1822–1898), French composer of light opera and friend of Jules Verne

==== L ====
- Aristide Laurent (1941–2011), American publisher and LGBT activist
- Aristide Leonori (1856–1928), Italian architect and engineer
- Aristide Letorzec (known as Lajariette) (1808–1848), 19th-century French playwright

==== M ====
- Aristide Joseph Bonaventure Maillol (1861–1944), French sculptor, painter, and printmaker
- Aristide Marre (1823–1918), French linguist
- Aristide Merloni (1897–1970), Italian businessman, founder of the Merloni industries
- Aristide Menezes (1947–1994), political figure in Guinea-Bissau
- Aristide Mugabe (born 1988), Rwandan professional basketball player

==== P ====
- Aristide Petrilli (1868–1930), Italian sculptor
- Aristide Pontanani, Italian Olympic fencer (1912 Olympics)
- Aristide Pozzali (1931–1979), Italian boxer

==== R ====
- Aristide Razu (1868–1950), Romanian Divisional General
- Aristide Rinaldini (1844–1920), Italian Cardinal
- Aristide Rompré (1912–1976), Canadian businessman and politician

==== S ====
- Aristide Sartor (born 1923), French Olympic rower

==== V ====
- Aristide Vallon (1826–1897), French naval officer, governor of Senegal, and member of Parliament
- Aristide Auguste Stanislas Verneuil (1823–1895), French physician and surgeon
- Aristide von Bienefeldt (1959–2016), the pen name of the Dutch novelist Rijk de Jong

==== Z ====
- Aristide Benoît Zogbo (born 1981), Ivorian professional football goalkeeper

=== People with the middle name or second name Aristide ===
- Élie-Aristide Astruc (1831–1905), French Rabbi, essayist, and Grand Rabbi of Belgium
- Giulio Aristide Sartorio (1860–1932), Italian painter and film director
- Henry Aristide Boucher, Jr. (1921–2009), lieutenant governor of Alaska
- Honoré-Jean-Aristide Husson (1803–1864), French academic sculptor
- Joseph Aristide Landry (1817–1881), member of the U. S. House of Representatives for Louisiana
- Jules-Aristide Bourdes-Ogouliguende (1938–2018), Gabonese politician
- Paul Montel, born Paul Antoine Aristide Montel (1876–1975), French mathematician
- Pierre Aristide Faron, Governor General of French Indochina (in office 1871–1875)
- Tell Aristide Frédéric Antoine Chapel (1849–1932), French General

=== People with the surname Aristide ===
- Mildred Trouillot-Aristide (born 1963), American lawyer and wife of Jean-Bertrand Aristide, the former President of Haïti
- Jean-Bertrand Aristide (born 1953) was a Haitian priest and president of Haiti.

== Other ==
- Aristide and the Endless Revolution, 2005 feature documentary about Haitian President Jean-Bertrand Aristide
- Aristide Briand station, a future Paris Metro station

== See also ==
- Aristides (disambiguation)
