= List of public art in Worcester, Massachusetts =

This is a list of public art in Worcester, Massachusetts, in the United States. This list applies only to works of public art on permanent display in an outdoor public space. For example, this does not include artworks in museums. Public art may include sculptures, statues, monuments, memorials, murals, and mosaics.

Image	Title / subject	Location and coordinates	Date	Artist / designer	Type	Material	Dimensions	Designation	Owner / administrator	Wikidata	Notes
More images	1898	Wheaton Square 42°16′23″N 71°48′1.5″W	1917	Andrew O'Connor	Statue	Bronze					
More images	Bigelow Monument	Worcester City Hall and Common 42°15′44″N 71°48′2″W	1861	George Snell	Monument	Granite; Marble					
More images	Burnside Fountain	Worcester City Hall and Common 42°15′41.3″N 71°48′0.82″W	1912	Henry Bacon; Charles Y. Harvey	Fountain	Bronze; Granite					
More images	Equestrian statue of Charles Devens	Institutional District 42°16′16″N 71°48′00″W	1906	Daniel Chester French; Edward Clark Potter	Monument	Bronze; Granite					
More images	Soldiers' Monument	Worcester City Hall and Common 42.262224°N 71.8°W	1874	Randolph Rogers	Monument	Bronze; Granite					
	Statue of Christopher Columbus	Union Station 42°15′42″N 71°47′41″W	1978	Aldo W. Gatti	Statue						
More images	Statue of George Frisbie Hoar	Worcester City Hall and Common 42°15′46.6″N 71°48′7″W	1908	Daniel Chester French	Statue	Bronze; Granite					
More images	Statue of John V. Power	Worcester City Hall and Common 42°15′44″N 71°48′7.5″W	1947	Aristide Berto Cianfarani	Statue	Bronze; Granite					
More images	Statue of Major Taylor	Worcester Public Library 42°15′36″N 71°48′2.5″W	2008	Antonio Tobias Mendez	Statue	Bronze					
	Statue of Sigmund Freud	Clark University 42°15′2.5″N 71°49′22″W	1999		Statue	Bronze					Located on the university's Red Square.
	Tornado Memorial	Quinsigamond Community College 42°18′55.5″N 71°47′46″W	1998		Memorial	Granite					Memorial to the victims of the 1953 Worcester tornado.
