= Aristides (disambiguation) =

Aristides (530–468 BCE) was an Athenian soldier and statesman who fought in the Battle of Marathon.

Aristides, also transliterated as Aristeides or Aristeidis (Greek: Ἀριστείδης), may refer also to:

== People ==
- Aristides of Thebes (4th century BCE), painter
- Aristeides (sculptor), (4th century BCE), sculptor
- Aristides of Miletus (2nd century BCE), writer of salacious tales
- Aelius Aristides (117–181), orator and rhetorician
- Aristides of Athens (2nd century), Christian writer and saint
- Aristides Quintilianus (3rd century), author of a musical treatise
- Aristeidis Moraitinis (1806–1885), Greek politician
- Arístides Villanueva, Argentine politician and merchant and governor of Mendoza Province (in office 1870–1873)
- Arístides Maragliano, Puerto Rico jurist (in office 1898–1899)
- Arístides Martínez (1847–1908), Chilean general
- Aristides Brezina (1848–1909), Austrian mineralogist
- Aristeidis Stergiadis (1861–1949), Greek politician, High Commissioner of Smyrna in 1919–22
- Arístides Chavier Arévalo (1867–1942), Puerto Rican pianist, composer, musicologist, and music author
- Aristides Agramonte (1868–1931), American physician, pathologist and bacteriologist
- Aristeidis Chasapidis (1875–1941), Greek general
- Aristides de Sousa Mendes (1885–1954), Portuguese diplomat who issued visas to Jews seeking to flee the Nazis
- Aristeidis Moraitinis (aviator) (1891–1918), Greek military aviator and World War I ace
- Aristeidis Metallinos (1908–1987), Greek sculptor
- Aristides Leão (1914–1993), Brazilian biologist
- Aristides Fraga Lima (born 1923), Brazilian writer
- Aristides Pereira (1923–2011), first president of Cape Verde from 1975 to 1991
- Arístides Bastidas (1924–1992), Venezuelan journalist, educator and scientist
- Aristidis Moschos (1930–2001), Greek musician
- Fred Aristidès (1931–2013), (known as Fred) French cartoonist
- Aristides Demetrios (born 1931), American modernist sculptor
- Arístides Royo (born 1940), President of Panama from 1978 to 1982
- Arístides Pineda (born 1940), Venezuelan hurdler
- Aristides Baltas (born 1943), Greek physicist and politician
- Aristides Sánchez (1943–1993), Nicaraguan Contra rebel
- Aristides Gomes (born 1954), Prime Minister of Guinea-Bissau from 2005 to 2007
- Arístides Mejía (born 1960), Honduran lawyer and Vice President Commissioner of Honduras
- Arístides González (born 1961), Puerto Rican boxer
- Arístides Victoria Yeb (born 1966), politician from the Dominican Republic
- Arístides Rojas (born 1970), Paraguayan footballer
- Aristides Masi (born 1977), Paraguayan footballer
- Aristeidis Grigoriadis (born 1985), Greek swimmer
- Aristeidis Lottas (born 1988), Greek footballer
- Aristides Soiledis (born 1991), Greek football player
- Aristides Aquino (born 1994), Dominican baseball player
- Joseph Epstein (writer) (born 1937), American editor and prolific essayist who used the pen name "Aristides"
- Prince Aristidis-Stavros of Greece and Denmark (born 2008), grandson of deposed Greek king Constantine II
- Aristeidis Psarros, Greek taekwondo practitioner

== Horse racing ==
- Aristides (horse) (1872-1893), American racehorse who won the first Kentucky Derby in 1875
- Aristides Breeders' Cup Stakes, a horse race held every June in Kentucky

== Other uses ==
- 2319 Aristides, a minor planet

== See also ==
- Aristide (disambiguation), the French, Romanian, and Italian spelling
