= Valter Di Salvo =

Italian fitness coach (born 1963)

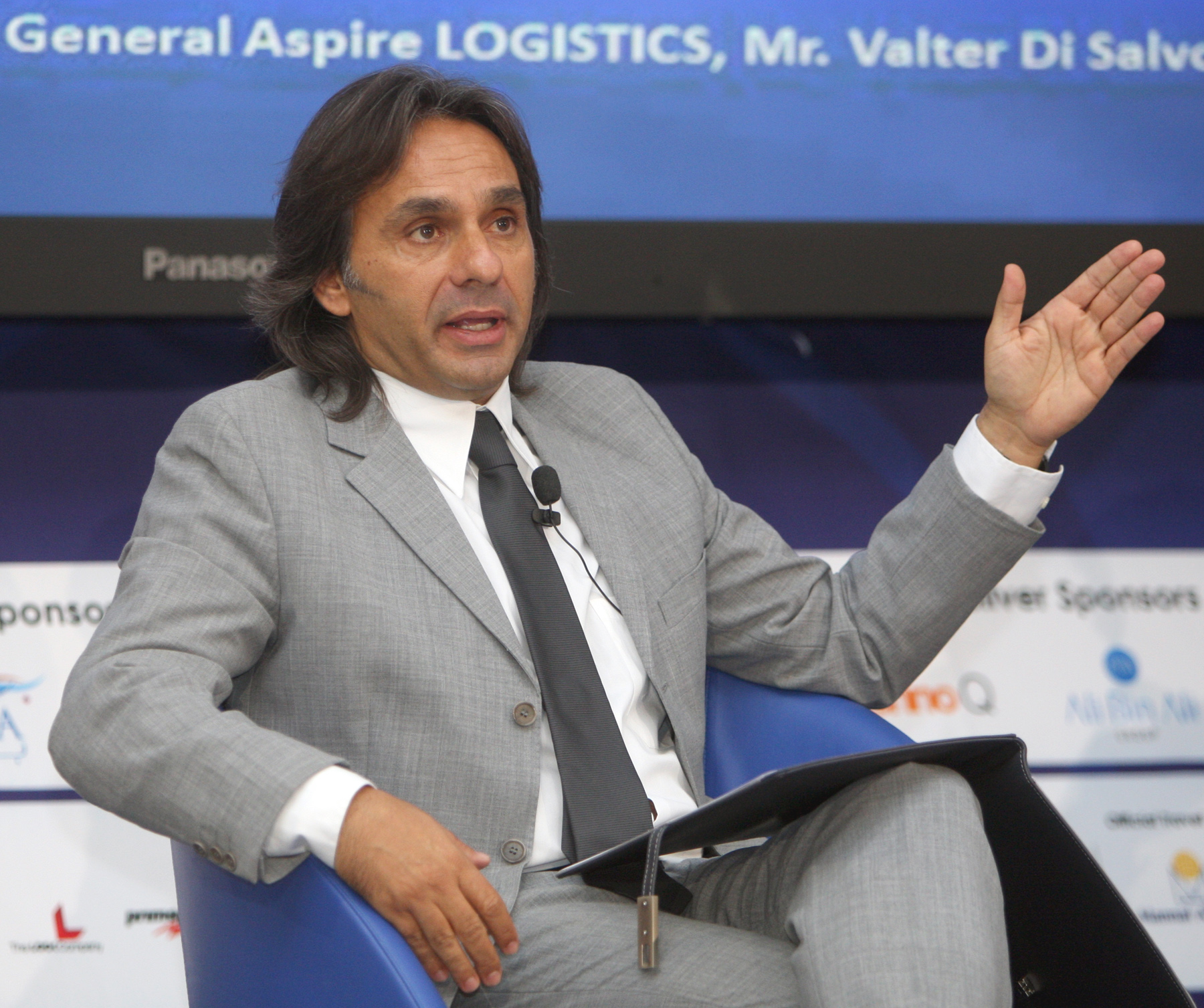
Di Salvo in 2011

Valter Di Salvo (born 2 July 1963) is the director of football performance & science at the ASPIRE Academy and Qatar Football Association; he is also the executive director of the Aspire in the World Fellows program and the annual Aspire Academy Global Summit.

Since August 2016 he has been in charge of the area "Performance e Ricerca" of Italian Football Federation.

Di Salvo began athletic training in 1989. His career started with Lazio and he has been affiliated with the club for 14 years. He was hired by Real Madrid in 2003 before joining in 2004 Sir Alex Ferguson's staff at Manchester United.

Di Salvo returned to Real Madrid in 2007 where he was appointed as director of Real Madrid TEC – the football high performance centre which he created and developed.

In 2001, he was awarded a Ph.D. in sports science at the University of Lisbon, and, since 2002, he is an associate professor at the Foro Italico University of Rome in the field of "sport methodology".

Di Salvo is the author of many scientific articles published in international journals and he is also heavily involved in the creation and discussion of academic literature surrounding the area of football performance.

== Sports career ==
=== Lazio (1989–2003) ===
In the 1989, Di Salvo became fitness trainer of the Under 21 team ("Primavera") and was appointed as the academy's head of fitness coaches. The following year he also started coordinating a group of 10 coaches in the U6-U11.

In 1998, Di Salvo was appointed as the in-charge fitness coach of the first-team squad, a position he served until 2003. During this time the club enjoyed the most successful period in its history, winning the Serie A title, one European Supercup, the UEFA Cup Winners’ Cup, the Italian Cup and two Italian Supercups.

=== Real Madrid (2003–2004) ===
Di Salvo was designated as fitness coach of Real Madrid's first team for the 2003–04 season. At that time Real Madrid won the Supercopa de España and included players such as David Beckham, Zinedine Zidane and Roberto Carlos.

=== Manchester United (2004–2007) ===
Before the start of the 2004–05 season, Di Salvo was nominated by Sir Alex Ferguson as fitness coach of Manchester United and his contract was renewed for three more seasons, until 2010. Nevertheless, during the summer of 2007, Real Madrid CF entrusted him with the direction of the club for both the performance and medical area and he became the leader of Real Madrid TEC.

=== Real Madrid (2007–2009) ===
During his second experience with the Spanish club, Di Salvo held the position of director of the performance and medical area. He created the Real Madrid TEC, the high-performance centre of the club, which was considered, at the time, a reference centre for football performance. This accomplishment led him to deliver presentations on training methodologies at the NASA headquarter and to share his knowledge on high performance.

As a member of the technical board, Di Salvo supported the decision to hire Cristiano Ronaldo with whom he had previously worked with in England.

=== Aspire Academy and Qatar Football Association (2010–present) ===
In April 2010, Di Salvo was appointed as director of football performance and science for Aspire Academy, Qatar Football Association and Qatar Stars League, with the goal to enhance player performance and to align technologies, processes and methodologies throughout the country.

Since 2014 he is the executive director of the Aspire Global Summit, a community which involves 50 top clubs/federations around the world and creates a platform to share experience on youth football performance development.

In October 2016, through a MoU agreement between Italian Football Federation (FIGC) and Qatar Football Association (QFA), he has been appointed as the responsible of the area "Performance e Ricerca" for Club Italia.

== Academic experience ==
From 1995 to 2001 Di Salvo was assistant professor at the Foro Italico University of Rome.

From 1998 to 2004, he was a professor in the Specialization School of Sport Medicine of the university "Tor Vergata" of Rome, where he taught sport training methodology.

As of 2002 Di Salvo is an associate professor at the Foro Italico University, in the area of "Sport methodology".

Since 2014 he is a visiting professor at the Faculty of Sport & Exercise Sciences at the John Moores University in Liverpool.
