= Statue of Prince Henry the Navigator =

Statue of Prince Henry the Navigator may refer to:

- Prince Henry the Navigator (statue), in Fall River, Massachusetts, United States
- Statue of Prince Henry the Navigator, Brasilia, Brazil
- Statue of Prince Henry the Navigator, London, in Belgrave Square, London, England
- Statue of Prince Henry the Navigator, Lisbon, in Belem, Lisbon, Portugal, as part of Padrão dos Descobrimentos, the Monument of the Discoveries
