= USS Power (DD-839) =

Gearing-class destroyer

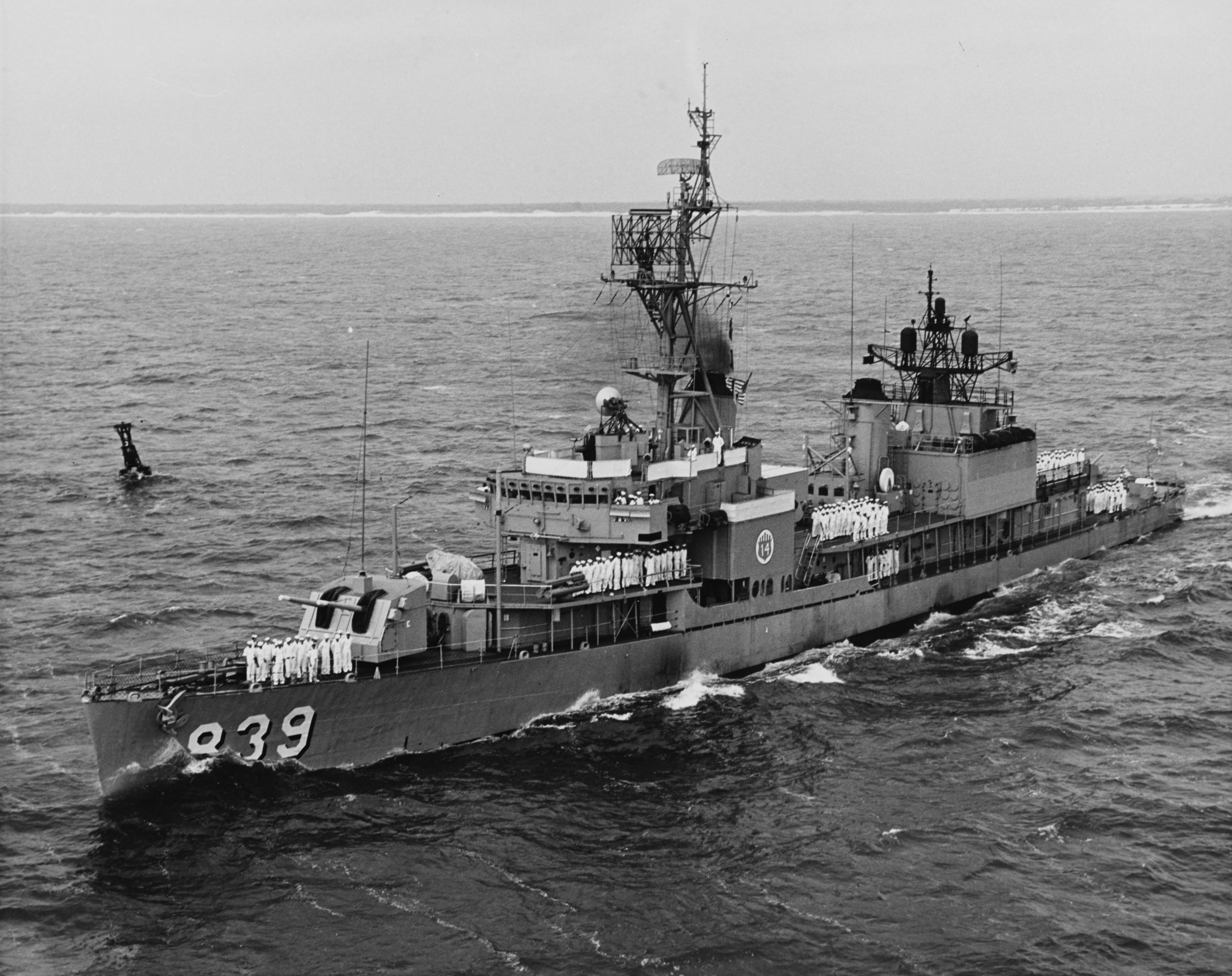
- USS Power underway in 1966

History

United States
- Name: Power
- Namesake: John V. Power
- Builder: Bath Iron Works
- Laid down: 26 February 1945
- Launched: 30 June 1945
- Sponsored by: Mrs. George F. Power
- Commissioned: 13 September 1945
- Decommissioned: 1 October 1977
- Stricken: 1 October 1977
- Identification: Callsign: NBBO; Hull number: DD-839
- Fate: Sold to Republic of China, 1 October 1977
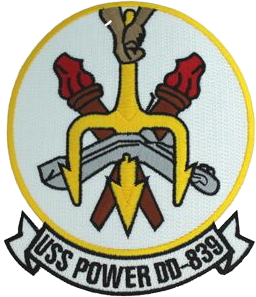
- Badge

History

Taiwan
- Name: Shen Yang
- Namesake: Shen Yang
- Acquired: 1 October 1977
- Commissioned: 18 December 1978
- Reclassified: DDG-923
- Decommissioned: 1 January 2006
- Identification: Hull number: DD-923
- Fate: Scrapped, November 2013

General characteristics
- Class & type: Gearing-class destroyer
- Displacement: 3,460 long tons (3,516 t) full
- Length: 390 ft 6 in (119.02 m)
- Beam: 40 ft 10 in (12.45 m)
- Draft: 14 ft 4 in (4.37 m)
- Propulsion: Geared turbines, 2 shafts, 60,000 shp (45 MW)
- Speed: 35 knots (65 km/h; 40 mph)
- Range: 4,500 nmi (8,300 km) at 20 kn (37 km/h; 23 mph)
- Complement: 336
- Armament: 6 × 5"/38 caliber guns; 12 × 40 mm AA guns; 11 × 20 mm AA guns; 10 × 21 inch (533 mm) torpedo tubes; 6 × depth charge projectors; 2 × depth charge tracks

USS Power (DD-839) was a Gearing-class destroyer of the United States Navy, the first Navy ship named for First Lieutenant John V. Power, USMC (1918–1944), who was posthumously awarded the Medal of Honor for heroism in the Battle of Kwajalein. This ship was involved in the Project SHAD tests off Newfoundland.

== Construction and career ==
Power was laid down on 26 February 1945 by the Bath Iron Works, Bath, Maine; launched on 30 June 1945; sponsored by Mrs. George F. Power, mother of Lt. Power; and commissioned on 13 September 1945 at Boston.

=== Service in the U.S. Navy ===
After shakedown out of Guantanamo Bay, Cuba, Power sailed on 9 January 1946 on the first of many Mediterranean deployments. Returning to the east coast six months later, she remained in the western Atlantic and Caribbean until late in 1948 when she again sailed for Mediterranean waters, to patrol the coast of Palestine under the direction of the United Nations Mediation Board.

During early 1950, Power operated with units of the British Royal Navy and visited ports in Northern Europe, whence she steamed to the Mediterranean for another tour with the 6th Fleet. In the summer of 1952, Power completed a South American cruise, then returned to the East Coast to resume her schedule of reservist and midshipman training cruises, fleet and type exercises, and Mediterranean deployments.

On 12 January 1955, Power collided with USS Warrington during a night exercise near Puerto Rico.

In early 1956 during antisubmarine warfare exercises, Power was involved in a collision with the destroyer Eaton (DD-510).

==== Lebanon crisis ====
In 1958, Power faced the Lebanon crisis with the 6th Fleet; and participated in the first Project Mercury launches after her return to the East Coast.

From November 1960 to January 1962, Power received a Fleet Rehabilitation and Modernization overhaul, giving her the ASROC system and DASH capability. By September 1962, she was back in the Mediterranean.

During her 1963 overseas deployment, Power served with the Middle East Force and at the end of the year, into 1964, operated off eastern Florida in connection with the Polaris program. Following another Mediterranean cruise and further East Coast exercises in late 1965, she steamed in mid-Atlantic as a member of the recovery teams for Gemini 6 and 7.

==== Vietnam War ====
During 1966 and 1967, she again served with the 6th Fleet and the Middle East Force, but in August 1968, she transited the Panama Canal for a tour in the western Pacific. With the 7th Fleet from 26 September 1968, she served in the "Yankee Station" surveillance area and provided gunfire support and search and rescue off South Vietnam. Power made a port call at Da Nang, South Vietnam, on 13 November 1968. She arrived Mayport, Florida, on 9 July 1969. Following a Mediterranean deployment in 1973, Power was transferred to the Naval Reserve Fleet and her homeport was moved to New York City at the NY State Maritime Academy pier (Fort Schuyler).

Power was decommissioned in September 1977 and sold to Taiwan in October.

=== Service in the Republic of China Navy ===
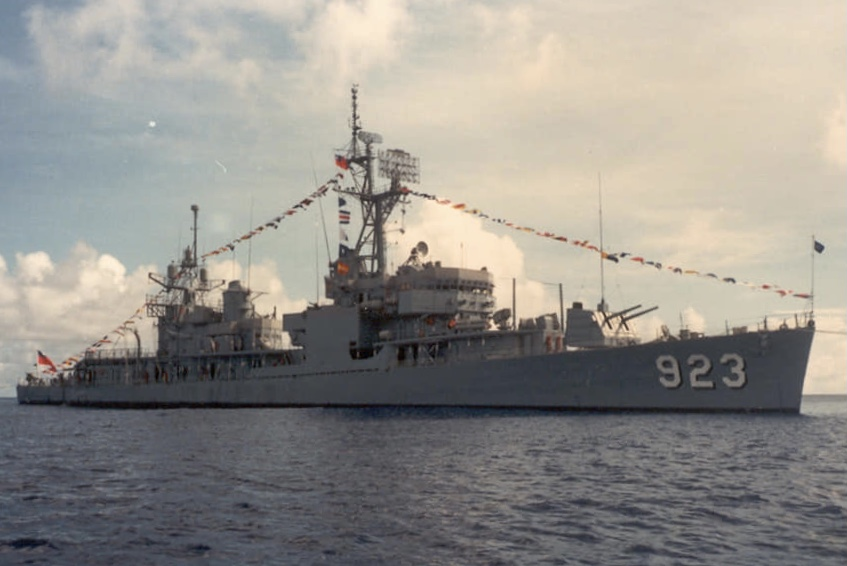
Shen Yang before her Wu-Chin III modernization program

The ship served in the Republic of China Navy as ROCS Shen Yang (DD-923).

Her number was changed to DDG-923 after she underwent Wu-Chin III modernization program.

Sheng Yang's decommissioning ceremony was held on 26 November 2005 in Keelung Harbor, in a ceremony hosted by Admiral Bon-Chi Chen, the commander-in-chief of the ROCN. Her official decommissioning was on 1 January 2006.

The ship, then Taiwan's last former Gearing-class destroyer, possibly was to become a museum ship, but unfortunately, plans fell through and she was scrapped in November 2013.
