= Aristide Guerriero =

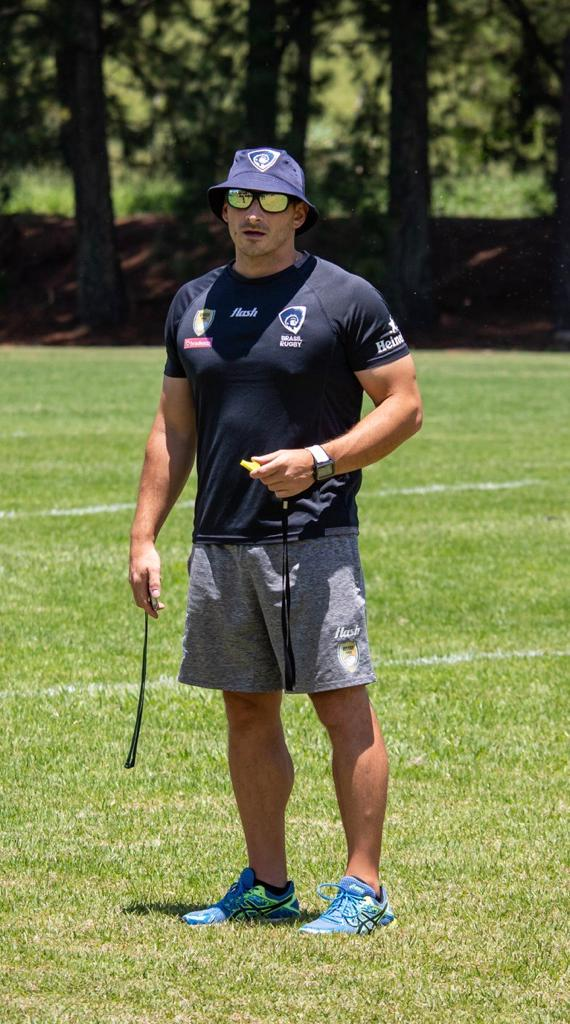
- Born: 7 December 1986 (age 39) Gaeta, Italy
- Height: 1.78 m (5 ft 10 in)
- Weight: 92 kg (203 lb)
- University: Foro Italico University of Rome
- Occupation(s): strength and conditioning coach, track and field coach

Rugby union career
Coaching career
- Years: Team
- 2015-2021: Brazil 7s
- 2021-2025: Nagato Blue Angels 7s
- 2025-present: (Italy) Italian Weightlifting Federation

Aristide Guerriero is an Italian former shot putter and throwing specialist. He is the strength and conditioning coach for the Italian Weightlifting Federation.

== Education ==
Guerriero earned his master's degree in Sport Science at Foro Italico University of Rome. He is a strength and conditioning specialist and tactical facilitator through the National Strength & Conditioning Association.

== Career ==
Guerriero served two years as the head strength and conditioning coach for the New Zealand Sports Academy.

In Wellington he collaborated with former Samoan thrower Shaka Sola, supervising the training of young New Zealand throwers. He was the strength and conditioning coach for Te Wananga o Aotearoa.

In 2018 Guerriero became the head of athletic performance of Brazil national rugby union team. He has been one of the strength and conditioning coaches for the first World Rugby Americas Combine in Glendale with some of the best athletes from Brazil, Uruguay, Canada, the US, Chile, and Venezuela. The Americas Combine XV Team won the final match versus the Colorado Raptors 59–31.

In 2019 Brazil Women Rugby 7s Team won the Hong Kong World Rugby Sevens Series Qualifier beating Scotland in the final 28–19. Since then Brazil has been a core team on the HSBC World Rugby Sevens Series.

Guerriero prepared the Brazil women's national rugby sevens team for the second 2020 Summer Olympics. The team won the gold medal in the 2019 Sudamérica Rugby Women's Sevens Olympic Qualifying Tournament and then finished 11th in Tokyo.

In January 2022, Guerriero was signed as strength and conditioning coach for the Japanese team Nagato Blue Angels Rugby Football Club.

In June 2023 the Nagato Blue Angels Rugby Football Club won the Taiyo Seimei Women's Seven Japanese Series. The team won twenty-four matches and finished the 2023 season unbeaten.

From January 2025 Guerriero became the strength coach for the Italian Weightlifting Federation. He supervises the athletic preparation for the Italian Weightlifting National Team athletes. He is part of the same organization's scientific committee for coach education.

In 2026, he supervised the preparation and return-to-competition process of athlete Giulia Imperio in the 48 kg category for the European Weightlifting Championships in Batumi, culminating in the achievement of three gold medals in the snatch, clean and jerk, and total.
