= John V. Power =

American military officer (1918–1944)

John Vincent Power
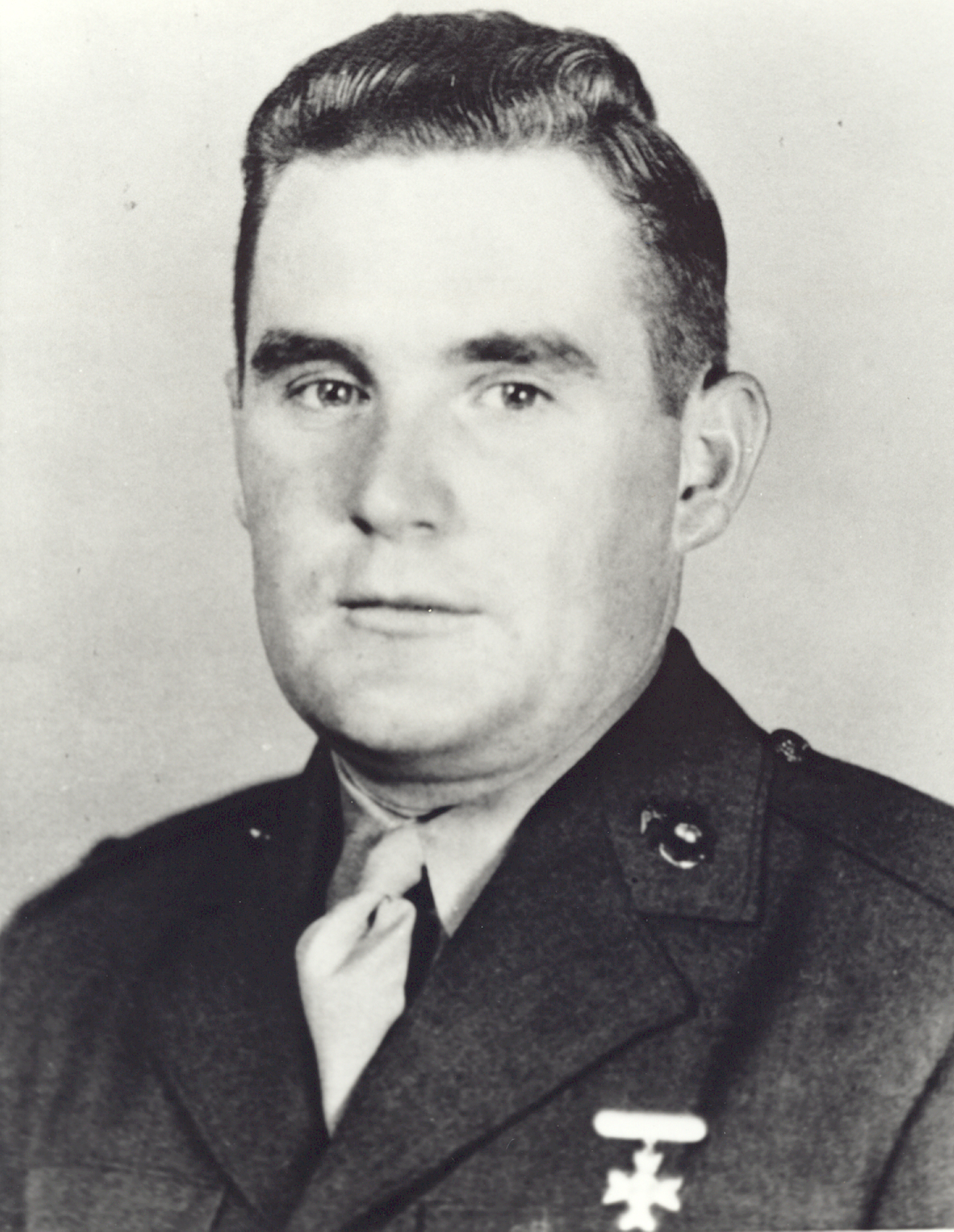
- John V. Power, Medal of Honor recipient
- Born: November 20, 1918; Worcester, Massachusetts
- Died: February 1, 1944 (aged 25); Namur Island, Kwajalein Atoll, Marshall Islands
- Burial place: St. John's Cemetery, Worcester, Massachusetts
- Education: College of the Holy Cross (BA)
- Military career
- Allegiance: United States of America
- Branch: United States Marine Corps
- Service years: 1942–1944
- Rank: First Lieutenant
- Units: Company K, 3rd Battalion, 24th Marines, 4th Marine Division
- Conflicts: World War II: Battle of Kwajalein †
- Awards: Medal of Honor; Purple Heart

John Vincent Power (November 20, 1918 – February 1, 1944) was a United States Marine Corps first lieutenant who posthumously received the Medal of Honor for his actions during the Battle of Kwajalein in World War II.

== Early life and career ==
Power was born on November 20, 1918, in Worcester, Massachusetts. He grew up in that city, living near the Cathedral of Saint Paul, and in 1937 graduated from Classical High School. He next attended the College of the Holy Cross, where he participated in tennis, basketball, football, and golf before his graduation in 1941.

One of his math teachers at Holy Cross was Reverend Joseph T. O'Callahan, who would himself receive the Medal of Honor as a Navy chaplain in World War II. O'Callahan remembered Power as "a good and determined student." After the war, Power's youngest sister, Patricia Power Rose, tended to O'Callahan as a student nurse at Worcester's Saint Vincent Hospital, where he was a patient.

Power enlisted in the Marine Corps Reserve on July 7, 1942, and was soon assigned to Officer Candidates School. He was commissioned a second lieutenant in the Reserve on October 31, 1942, and entered the 14th Reserve Officers Class at Quantico, Virginia, for a two-month course of instruction.

== World War II ==
In January 1943, Power joined Company E, 3rd Separate Battalion, and deployed with that unit in March to Camp Pendleton, California. The designation of his unit was changed to Company K, 3rd Battalion, 24th Marine Regiment, and the unit subsequently joined the newly formed 4th Marine Division. He was promoted to first lieutenant on August 31, 1943.

Power sailed with his unit in mid-January 1944 from San Diego harbor, and on February 1, 1944, the 24th Marines participated in the assault at Roi-Namur in the Kwajalein Atoll, Marshall Islands. Roi was captured in short order and the surviving Japanese fled to nearby Namur. It was during the battle of Namur Island that Power was killed in action when he charged a Japanese pillbox despite a severe stomach wound.

The Medal of Honor was presented to his parents by President Franklin D. Roosevelt at the White House in November 1944.

Power was initially buried in the 4th Marine Division Cemetery on Roi-Namur. His remains were later returned for burial at St. John's Cemetery in his hometown of Worcester, Massachusetts.

The destroyer USS Power (DD-839) was named in his honor. A plaque commemorating the USS Power is located at his alma mater, the College of the Holy Cross, in front of the Hogan Campus Center. Power's sisters donated his Medal of Honor to Holy Cross.

In 1947, a statue of John V. Power was dedicated in the Worcester City Hall and Common.

== Medal of Honor citation ==
Power's official Medal of Honor citation reads:

For conspicuous gallantry and intrepidity at the risk of his life above and beyond the call of duty as platoon leader, attached to the 4th Marine Division, during the landing and battle of Namur Island, Kwajalein Atoll, Marshall Islands, 1 February 1944. Severely wounded in the stomach while setting a demolition charge on a Japanese pillbox, 1st Lt. Power was steadfast in his determination to remain in action. Protecting his wound with his left hand and firing with his right, he courageously advanced as another hostile position was taken under attack, fiercely charging the opening made by the explosion and emptying his carbine into the pillbox. While attempting to reload and continue the attack, 1st Lt. Power was shot again in the stomach and head and collapsed in the doorway. His exceptional valor, fortitude and indomitable fighting spirit in the face of withering enemy fire were in keeping with the highest traditions of the U.S. Naval Service. He gallantly gave his life for his country.

== Awards and decorations ==

1st row	Medal of Honor	Purple Heart	Combat Action Ribbon Retroactively Awarded, 1999
2nd row	American Campaign Medal	Asiatic-Pacific Campaign Medal with 1 Campaign star	World War II Victory Medal

== See also ==
- William D. Hawkins, Marine whose posthumous Medal of Honor was awarded on the same day as Power's.
