= Aristides Fraga Lima =

Brazilian writer

- Born: July 2, 1923; Paripiranga, Brazil
- Died: c. 1996 (aged 72–73)
- Occupation: Teacher
- Language: Portuguese
- Education: Federal University of Bahia
- Genre: Children's fiction
- Notable works: Coleção Vaga-Lume

Aristides Fraga Lima (b. July 2, 1923 - c. 1996) is a popular Brazilian writer who was born in town of Paripiranga in the state of Bahia. He had a degree in Languages and Law. After graduating from the Federal University of Bahia, he became a teacher of multiple languages.

== Bibliography ==
These books are part of the Coleção Vaga-Lume (Firefly Collection) of juvenile fiction published by Ática:

- A serra dos dois meninos (Mountain of the two young boys)
- Os Pequenos Jangadeiros (The Little Rafters) (ISBN 8508017626)
- Perigos no Mar (Dangers at Sea)
