= USS Warrington (DD-843) =

Gearing-class destroyer

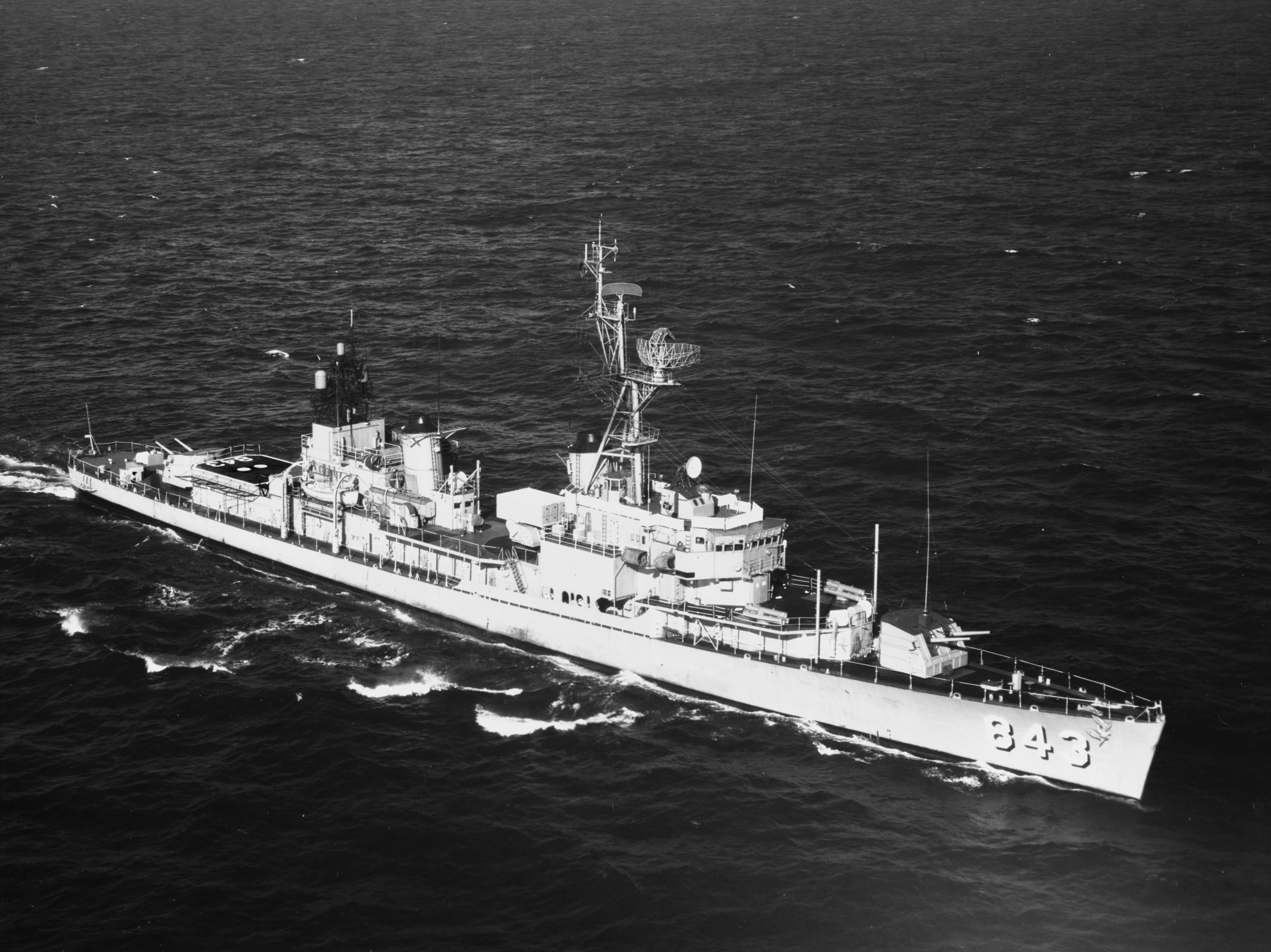
- USS Warrington (DD-843)

History

United States
- Name: USS Warrington
- Namesake: Lewis Warrington, awarded Congressional Gold Medal
- Builder: Bath Iron Works, Bath, Maine
- Laid down: 23 April 1945
- Launched: 27 September 1945
- Sponsored by: Mrs. Katherine Chubb Sheehan
- Commissioned: 20 December 1945
- Decommissioned: 30 September 1972
- Stricken: 1 October 1972
- Home port: Newport, Rhode Island
- Identification: Callsign: NBBW; Hull number: DD-843
- Fate: transferred to Taiwan, 24 April 1973, for spare parts

General characteristics
- Class & type: Gearing-class destroyer
- Displacement: 3,460 tons
- Length: 390 ft 6 in (119.02 m) (oa)
- Beam: 40 ft 10 in (12.45 m)
- Draft: 14 ft 4 in (4.37 m) (Max)
- Propulsion: 60,000 SHP (44.7 MW); General Electric Geared Turbines, 2 screws
- Speed: 36.8 knots (68.2 km/h)
- Range: 4,500 NM@ 20 Knots (8.300 km @ 37 km/h)
- Complement: 336 officers and enlisted
- Armament: 6 x 5 in (130 mm) AA (3x2); 12 x 40 mm AA; 11 x 20 mm AA; 10 x 21 inch (533 mm) tt.(2x5)

USS Warrington (DD-843) was a Gearing-class destroyer that served the U.S. Navy from the end of World War II to the Vietnam War, when she was damaged by two underwater explosions, causing her to be listed as "beyond repair" and excessed to the Navy of the Republic of China.

== Built in Bath, Maine ==
The third U.S. Navy ship to be so named, Warrington (DD-843) was laid down on 14 May 1945 at Bath, Maine, by the Bath Iron Works Corporation; launched on 27 September 1945; sponsored by Mrs. Katherine Chubb Sheehan; and commissioned at the Boston Naval Shipyard on 20 December 1945.

== Naval service ==
=== Post-World War II service ===
Warrington conducted shakedown training and winter exercises in the West Indies during February and early March and then returned to Boston, Massachusetts, for duty in Destroyer Division (DesDiv) 82, Destroyer Squadron (DesRon) 8.

During the next year, the destroyer cruised almost the length of the eastern seaboard plane-guarding for carriers such as USS Ranger. Late in the spring of 1946, she joined USS Little Rock in an extended cruise to Europe and visited ports in England, Scotland, Sweden, Denmark, Belgium, Portugal, and the Netherlands before entering the Mediterranean for her first tour of duty with the U.S. 6th Fleet. That assignment ended on 8 February 1947 when she passed through the Strait of Gibraltar on her way back home. Warrington arrived at New York City on 19 February and entered the naval shipyard there for voyage repairs.

At the conclusion of the yard work on 8 March, she steamed to her new home port, Newport, Rhode Island, and for two years cruised along the U.S. East Coast, serving primarily as gunnery training ship for the Atlantic Destroyer Force. In April 1949, the ship was reassigned to DesDiv 222, which she served as flagship, and to DesRon 22. Late that summer, she departed the New England coast for a two-month training voyage to the West Indies. After a brief stop at Norfolk, Virginia, at the conclusion of those maneuvers, Warrington headed north at the end of October for cold weather training near the Arctic Circle, returning to Newport on 20 November.

On 3 January 1950, the destroyer sailed from Newport in company with her squadron and USS Wright for hunter/killer exercises along the U.S. East Coast and in the vicinity of Bermuda. The following month, she conducted antisubmarine warfare (ASW) exercises with USS Dogfish out of Newport News, Virginia, before returning to that port for a brief yard availability.

The ship next returned north to Newport for a tour of duty with the Operational Development Force detachment during which her division tested ASW tactics in company with USS Saipan along the coast of Newfoundland and in the waters around Iceland. That assignment lasted from 10 July to 8 August, at which time she returned to Newport to prepare for her second deployment to the Mediterranean. That tour of duty lasted only two months and one day. The destroyer returned to Newport on 10 November and resumed normal east coast operations.

=== Mediterranean cruise period ===
In January 1951, Warrington changed from DesDiv 222 to DesDiv 142 for which she served as flagship. Over the next eight years, the destroyer settled into a fairly repetitive routine, alternating four deployments to the U.S. 6th Fleet with operations out of Newport. Her Mediterranean cruises came in the spring of 1952, the summers of 1954 and 1956, and in the spring of 1957.

12 January 1955, Warrington collided with USS Power near Puerto Rico.

Her U.S. 2d Fleet duties consisted primarily of ASW training in company with U.S. Atlantic Fleet aircraft carriers and took her from the coast of New England south to the Caribbean and the West Indies.

=== Providing cadet training ===
In May 1959, Warrington was reassigned to DesDiv 102. In June, she embarked U.S. Naval Academy midshipmen at Annapolis, Maryland, for a unique training cruise. Instead of Europe or the West Indies, the area of activity for that voyage was the Great Lakes.

Warrington passed through the newly constructed St. Lawrence Seaway and participated in the opening ceremonies for the waterway led by Queen Elizabeth II of Great Britain and President Dwight D. Eisenhower of the United States. At the conclusion of those ceremonies—held at Montreal, Canada, on 26 June -- Warrington continued on her mission, visiting a series of American ports on the Great Lakes, including Chicago, Illinois, Detroit, Michigan, and Sault Ste. Marie, Michigan, among others before returning to Newport on 4 August.

During the next 22 months, she performed her normal duties out of Newport. Exercises along the east coast occupied her for the remainder of 1959 and the beginning of 1960. On 21 March, she began another cruise with the 6th Fleet which also included a six-week assignment with the Middle East Force between 16 June and 28 July. She concluded her Mediterranean deployment at Rota, Spain, on 7 October and reentered Newport on the 15th. East coast operations—broken only by a visit to Washington, D.C., in January 1961 for the inauguration of President John F. Kennedy and duty as a recovery ship for a Project Mercury test in February—dominated her schedule until late in the spring of 1961.

=== 1961 modernization ===
On 12 May, the destroyer entered the New York Naval Shipyard for major alterations during her Mark I Fleet Rehabilitation and Modernization (FRAM I) overhaul. Those modifications reflected the enormous technological advances registered in antisubmarine warfare since the end of World War II and might be considered the beginning of the final phase in the shift of mission for destroyers from a surface-attack role to that of a submarine hunter.

Her superstructure silhouette changed markedly as she received a larger combat information center (CIC) and sonar control as well as an antisubmarine rocket (ASROC) launcher, a torpedo magazine, and a hangar and flight deck for the Gyrodyne QH-50 DASH, a drone antisubmarine helicopter. The new ASROC launcher was installed between the stacks in the space formerly held by her 21 inch (533 mm) torpedo tubes which, in turn, were replaced by two 12.75-inch triple torpedo tube mounts located on the 01 level forward of the bridge — one to port and the other to starboard. These MK 32 mounts replaced the second 5-inch 38-caliber gun mount forward. The DASH flight deck and hangar, along with the ASROC/torpedo magazine was installed just aft of the after stack. Her surface battery was thus reduced to two twin 5-inch, 38-caliber in twin mounts.

=== East coast operations ===
Warrington's FRAM conversion took eight days short of a year. She emerged from the New York Naval Shipyard on 4 May 1962 and began various post-conversion qualifications and tests which culminated in refresher training in the Guantanamo Bay area during June and July. After two weeks at the Fleet Sonar School at Key West, Florida, she returned to Newport on 12 August to begin duty with the Atlantic Fleet's ASW forces.

Over the next 27 months, Warrington's east coast operations routine—annual "Springboard" operations in the Caribbean and ASW training evolutions out of Newport—was spiced up by a series of special assignments. On 19 September 1962, she got underway to serve as a unit of the recovery group for Lt. Comdr. Walter Schirra's "Sigma Seven" space flight which took place on 3 October. Later that month, when the Cuban Missile Crisis occurred, the destroyer joined a special ASW task group which, though it did not participate in the actual quarantine, performed a support role for the ships so engaged.

=== Searching for the Thresher ===
During early April 1963, the warship helped to conduct the unsuccessful search-and-rescue attempt prompted by the loss of the nuclear-powered submarine USS Thresher during deep-submergence tests. After a summer of operations out of Newport, Warrington got underway for the Indian Ocean on 1 October.

Steaming via the Atlantic Ocean and the Mediterranean, she arrived in Karachi, Pakistan, at the end of the first week in November. For the next fortnight, the destroyer joined other United States and CENTO powers' ships in Operation "Midlink VI." She began the voyage home on 23 November and, after stops at several ports, returned to Newport on 23 December.

=== Collision with USS Barry ===
The first eight months of 1964 brought 2d Fleet operations, broken only by a repair period at Norfolk and another later one at Boston following her collision with USS Barry on 25 July. Between 8 September and 18 December, the ship made another brief deployment to the Mediterranean, highlighted by Operation "Masterstroke" and NATO Exercise "Teamwork" during the outbound voyage. While conducting the latter operation, Warrington briefly ventured north of the Arctic Circle.

Warrington returned to Newport on 18 December 1964 and began almost two years of operations along the east coast—primarily ASW training evolutions—as well as occasional cruises to the Caribbean area for "Springboard" operations, gunnery drills, and refresher training. That duty ended late on 4 October 1966 when the destroyer stood out of Newport to deploy to the Far East.

=== Reassigned to the Pacific Ocean ===
She transited the Panama Canal on 9 October, stopped at Pearl Harbor on 24 October, and arrived at Yokosuka, Japan, on 10 November. That same day, she headed for the Tonkin Gulf in company with USS Manley and USS Keppler. On 21 November, she relieved USS Reeves on "Traffic Cop" station off the coast of North Vietnam. Operation Traffic Cop, soon to be redesignated Operation Sea Dragon, was an ongoing patrol to interdict waterborne logistics to the insurgents in South Vietnam.

After 13 days of "Traffic Cop" duty, Warrington put into Danang on 3 December before sailing later that same day for Kaohsiung, Taiwan. There she spent another 13 days undergoing a tender availability alongside USS Isle Royale before getting underway for Hong Kong on the 19th.

On 26 December 1966, she departed Hong Kong to return to the Gulf of Tonkin, this time for plane guard duty with the fast carriers on Yankee Station. She continued that assignment until 19 January 1967 when she steamed south to the II Corps area of South Vietnam to provide naval gunfire support for troops of the 1st Cavalry Division conducting Operation Thayer II ashore. She completed that mission on 25 January and headed for Kaohsiung for another tender availability.

Following a visit to Hong Kong and another repair period—at Subic Bay in the Philippines—the destroyer resumed plane guard duty in the Gulf of Tonkin on 27 February. On 10 March, she parted company with the carrier USS Ticonderoga to conduct a gunfire support mission in the III Corps zone near Rung Sat. She completed that task early on 24 March and set a course for Subic Bay. There, the warship rendezvoused with USS Keppler, USS Manley, and USS Newman K. Perry for the voyage home.

The four destroyers began their journey home on 26 March, heading west across the Indian Ocean rather than east back across the Pacific Ocean. On their way, they stopped at Singapore and Massawa in Ethiopia, transited the Suez Canal, stopped at Palma Majorca, Spain, Naples, Italy and then steamed across the Mediterranean Sea, and visited Ponta Delgada in the Azores before arriving back in Newport on 8 May.

=== Return to East Coast operations ===
The ensuing years brought a return to the familiar routine of east coast operations alternated with deployments to the 6th Fleet in the Mediterranean.

After eight months of training, readiness inspections, and the other normal evolutions of duty out of Newport, RI "Warrington" departed the United States in mid-February 1968, bound for a four-month tour of duty with the 6th Fleet.

During that deployment, she visited a number of Mediterranean and Northern European ports. The Mediterranean ports included Naples Italy, Golfe-Juan France, Valletta Malta, Palma Majorca and Rota Spain (for two hours). The Northern European ports included, Rotterdam The Netherlands, Bremen Germany and Bergen Norway.

Warrington returned to the United States on 14 June 1968 and operated out of Newport until October. On the 18th, she entered the Boston Naval Shipyard for a five-month overhaul.

She completed her post-overhaul sea trials between 27 March and 3 April 1969 and returned to Newport on 5 April. Between 10 April and 27 June, the warship voyaged to the West Indies to conduct gunnery drills at Culebra Island and refresher training out of Guantanamo Bay, Cuba. She returned to Newport on 27 June and spent the major portion of the summer and the entire fall in an extended upkeep and in preparations for overseas movement.

On 2 November, the destroyer stood out of Newport and headed back to the Mediterranean. During that assignment, her primary mission was to observe units of the Soviet Navy operating in the eastern Mediterranean. However, she also made goodwill visits and liberty calls at ports all along the Mediterranean coastline. On 13 May 1970, Warrington completed her tour of duty with the 6th Fleet and began her journey home.

She reentered Newport on 22 May and began post-deployment leave and upkeep. Following a month of repairs at Boston late in July and early in August, the warship spent most of the remainder of the year in Newport, though she did get underway for two brief periods at sea—once in September for the America's Cup yachting race and again in October to escort USS Forrestal during the carrier's post-repair acceptance trials.

On 14 January, Warrington embarked upon a two-month cruise to the Mediterranean to participate in 6th Fleet ASW exercises. She returned to Newport on 3 March and resumed her 2d Fleet routine. Her duties included two tours as school ship for the Destroyer School and the ever-present ASW training operations. Regular overhaul commenced on 15 September 1971 and ended on 16 January 1972.

Following overhaul and a brief visit to Newport, Warrington put to sea on 23 January for post-overhaul gunnery drills and refresher training in the Caribbean. She completed those evolutions on 21 March and headed back to Newport for a brief period of local operations before her second deployment to the Far East.

=== Return to Pacific Ocean operations ===
Departing Newport on 5 June, Warrington headed, via the Panama Canal and Pearl Harbor, for the Mariana Islands. Arriving at Guam on 30 June, she departed Apra Harbor the following day, bound for Subic Bay. She left the Philippines in July and reached Vietnamese waters the same day. During her first period on the gunline, the destroyer conducted gunfire support missions along the coast of the I Corps zone of South Vietnam.

On 15 July, she put into port at Danang briefly and then headed for the coast of North Vietnam to participate in Operation Linebacker. On 16 July, she relieved USS Hamner of Linebacker duty and began her primary blockade and interdiction mission—the destruction of North Vietnamese small craft and observation of communist Chinese merchant shipping. The following morning, while operating in company with USS Hull and USS Robison, Warrington came under the rapid and heavy fire of enemy shore batteries. She took prompt evasive action and avoided damage.

=== Struck by an underwater explosion ===
That same afternoon, at 1316, two underwater explosions close aboard her port side rocked the destroyer. She suffered severe damage in her after fireroom, after engine room, and in the main control room. Her crew enabled her to retire from the area at 10 knots. USS Hull maneuvered alongside to transfer repair personnel, pumps, and shoring equipment to Warrington to address continuing flooding. Before returning to station, Hull also transferred feedwater to help maintain boiler operation, along with several movies for the slow trip. Later, the damage forced her to shut down her propulsion plant and ask Robison for a tow.

Through the night of 17 and 18 July, her crew struggled against flooding caused by ruptured fuel oil and fresh water tanks. The next morning USS Robison turned her over to USS Reclaimer for the first leg of the trip to Subic Bay. USS Tawakoni took over from USS Reclaimer on the 20th and towed Warrington safely into Subic Bay on the 24th. Throughout the six-day voyage, Warrington's ship's company worked to keep their ship afloat.

Around 1 December 1972, the Navy announced that Warrington had struck two American Mark 36 mines after finding fragments of a specific fuse on the ship. At the time, officials speculated that the mines had been jettisoned from an aircraft, but apparently the location had not recorded to warn ships of the location. According to the account of a retired chief mineman, who worked at Naval Magazine Subic Bay converting Mk 82 bombs to Mk 36 mines during that time period, the ship disregarded warning messages and entered a known area where aircraft jettisoned bombs and mines.

== Unfit for further Naval service ==
For a month after her arrival, the ship repair facility at Subic Bay worked to improve her habitability and ensure watertight integrity. At the end of August, a board of inspection and survey found her to be unfit for further naval service. On 30 September 1972, Warrington was decommissioned at Subic Bay, and she was struck from the Navy list. On 24 April 1973, she was sold to the Taiwan Navy for cannibalization and scrapping.

== Honors and awards ==
Warrington (DD-843) received two battle stars for service in the Vietnam War.

Warrington and her crew received the following awards, chronologically:

- Navy Expeditionary Medal, relating to Cuba, for 3 periods in 1961 and 1962.
- Armed Forces Expeditionary Medal, relating to Cuba, for 11 November 1962 and 5 to 18 December 1962.
- Vietnam Service Medal, for 4 separate periods between 18 November 1966 and 29 March 1967 and a period in July 1972.
- Combat Action Ribbon, for 17 July 1972.
