= Embassy of Portugal, London =

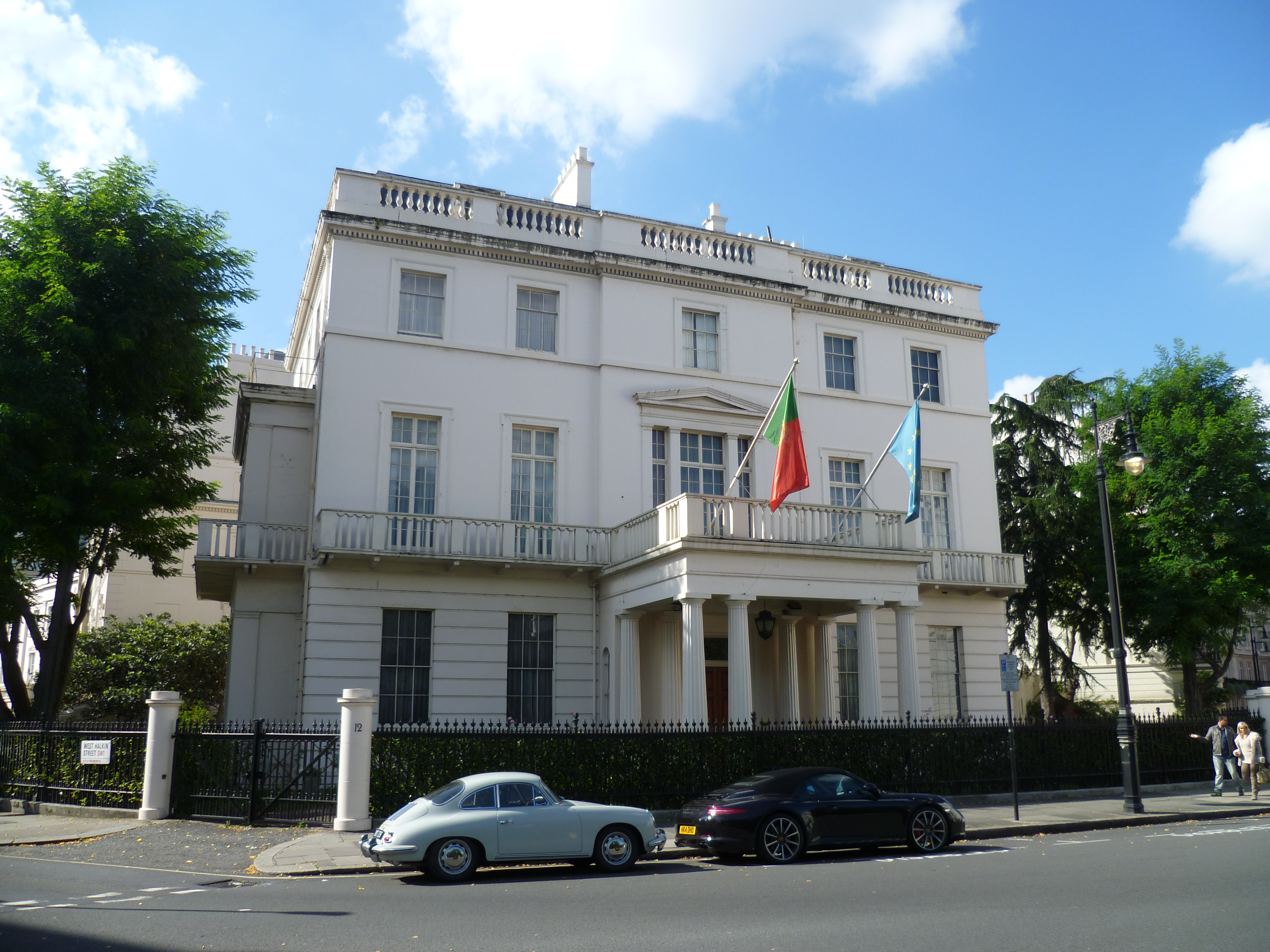
- Address: 11 Belgrave Square; London, SW1
- Coordinates: 51°29′58.5″N 0°9′18.7″W
- Ambassador: Nuno Brito

The Embassy of Portugal in London is the diplomatic mission of Portugal in the United Kingdom. The embassy is located on Belgrave Square, Belgravia, in two separate buildings, and there is also a Portuguese consulate in Portland Place, Fitzrovia.

== History ==
The Portuguese Embassy had previously been situated at 23–24 Golden Square, Soho, London, W1F 9JP from 1724 to 1747; the Marquess of Pombal served as Ambassador from 1738 to 1744. During this period a chapel (now the Church of Our Lady of the Assumption and St Gregory) was under the protection of the embassy. The embassy was situated at 74 South Audley Street in Mayfair from 1747 to 1829.

The embassy is now situated in a stucco terrace of c. 1825, designed by George Basevi. The building is part of a single group of Grade I listed buildings at 1–11 Belgrave Square.

On 2 February 2002 a ceremony on the corner of the square facing the embassy took place, unveiling a statue of the Anglo-Portuguese prince Henry the Navigator, whose English ancestry derived from his mother, Philippa of Lancaster. The statue is a copy of the statue in Fall River, Massachusetts, USA, by Aristide Berto Cianfarani.

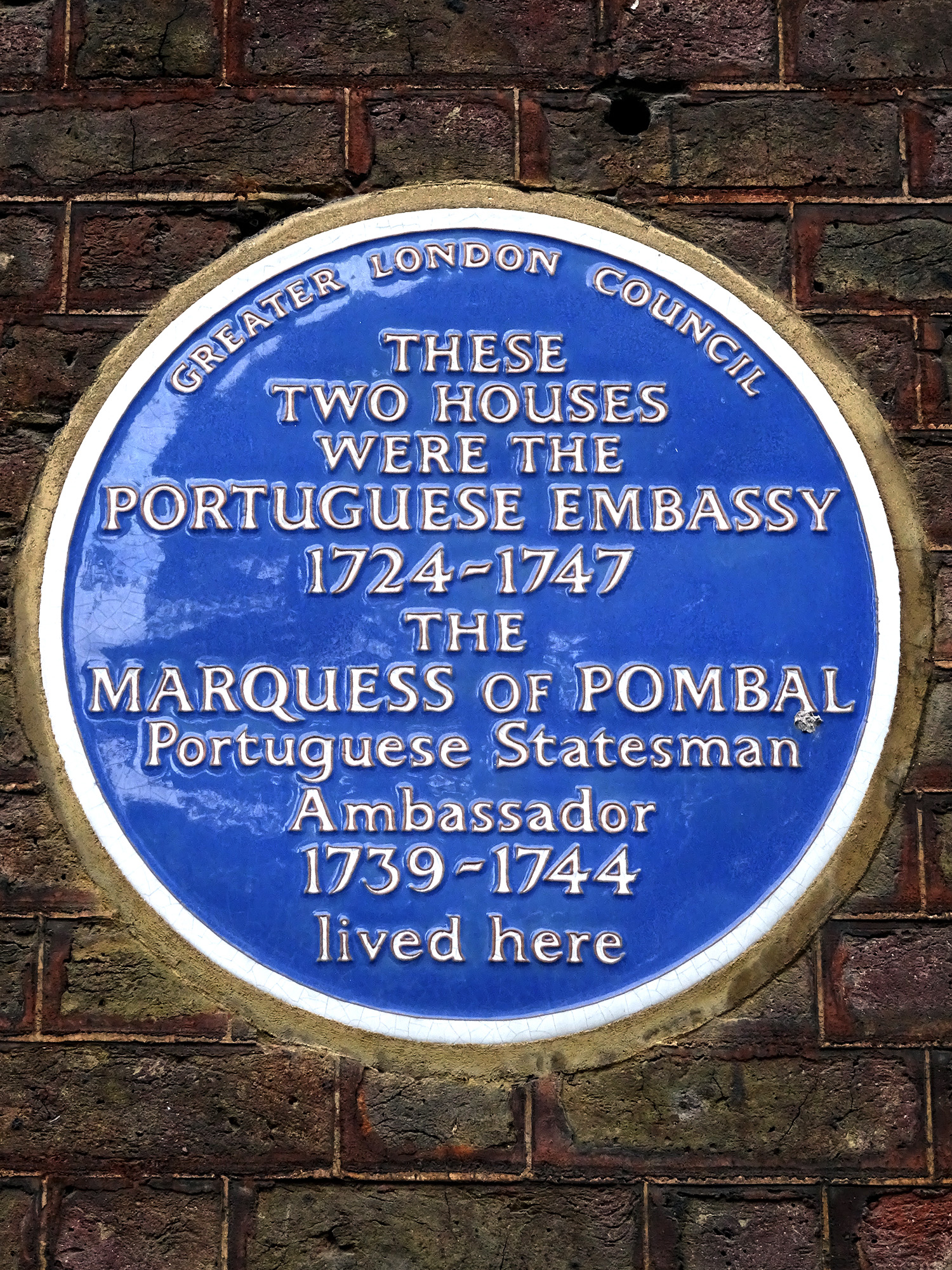
Blue plaque at the site of the previous Portuguese Embassy in Golden Square

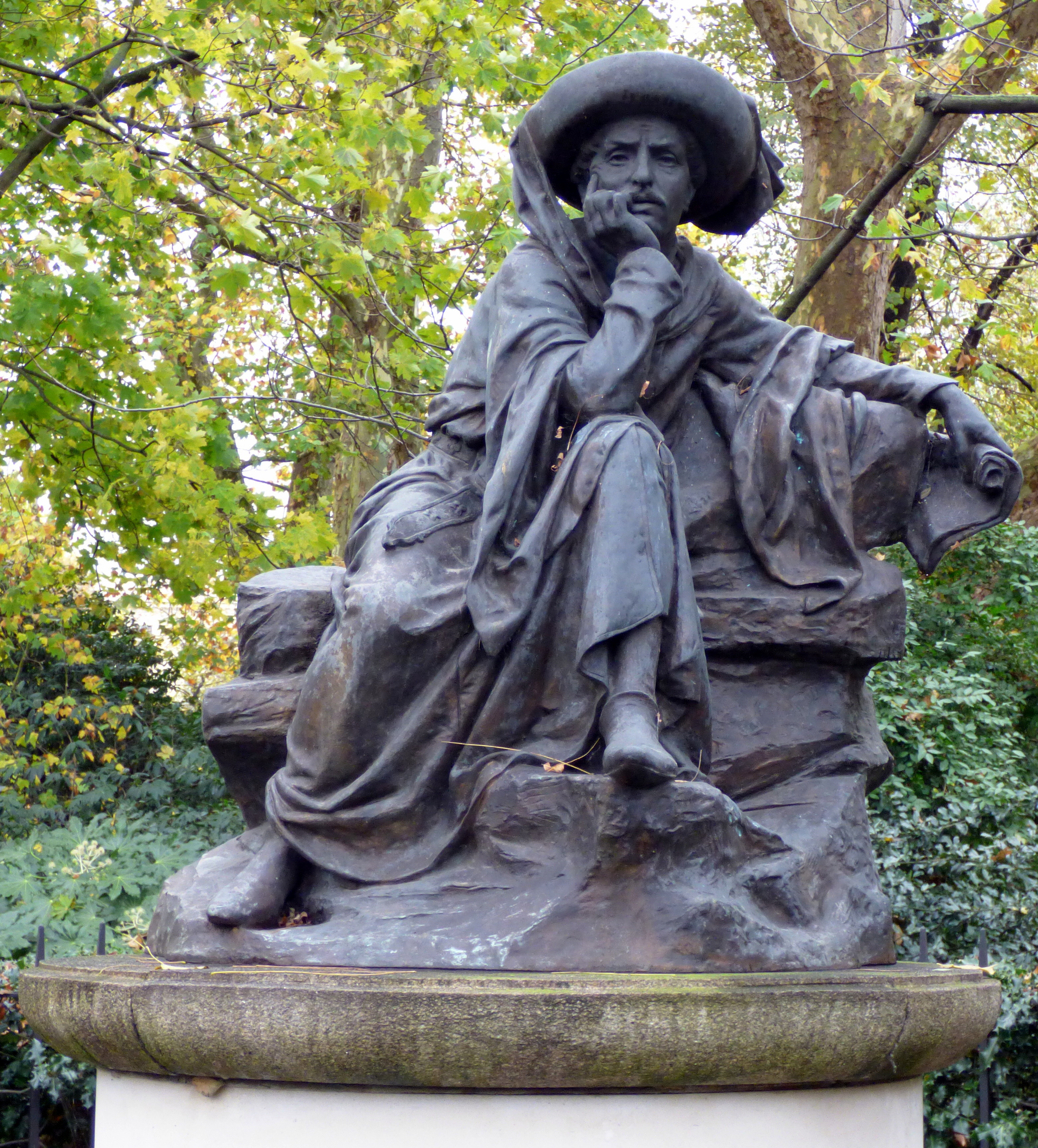
Statue of Henry the Navigator outside the embassy

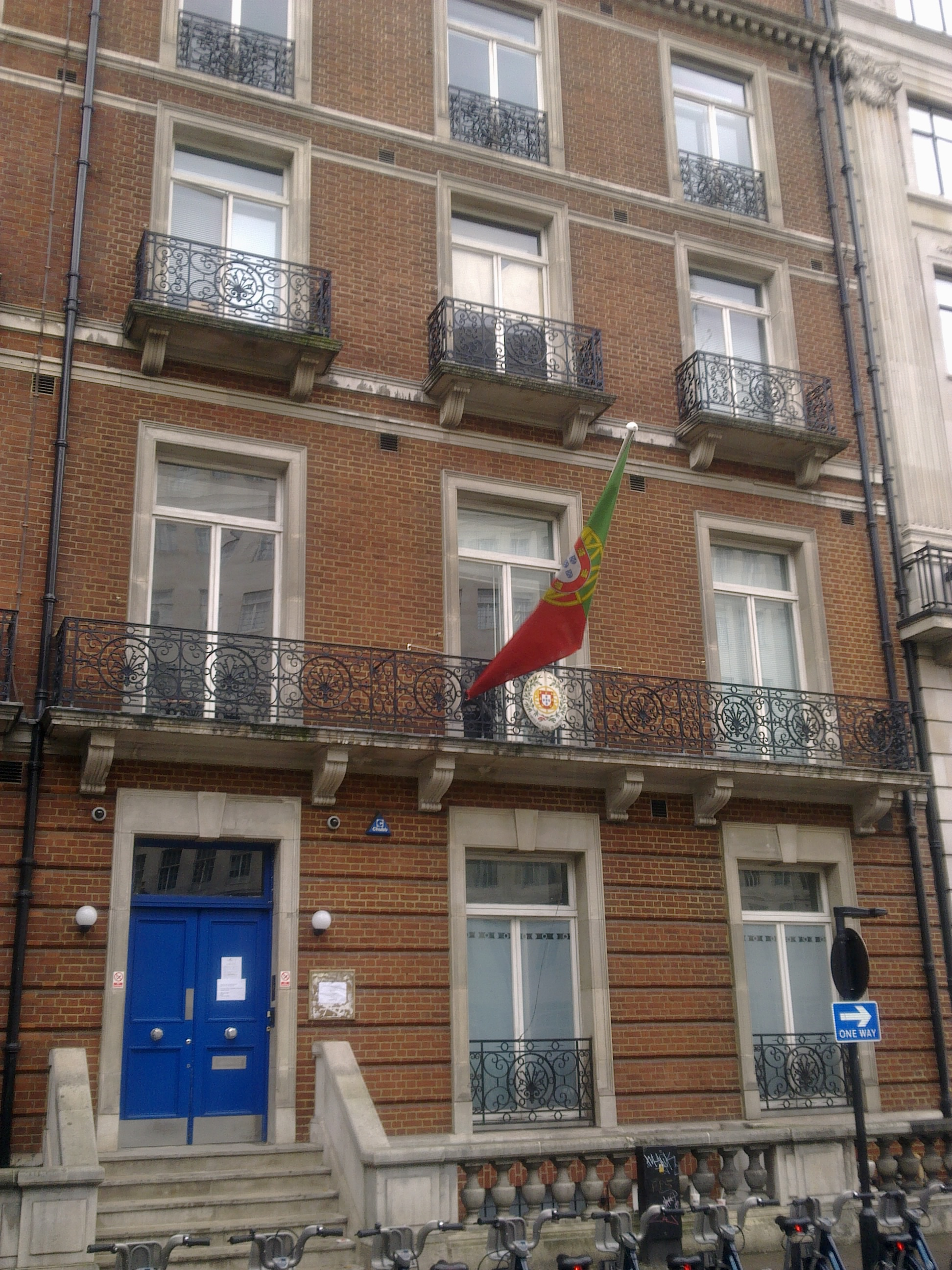
The Consulate on Portland Place

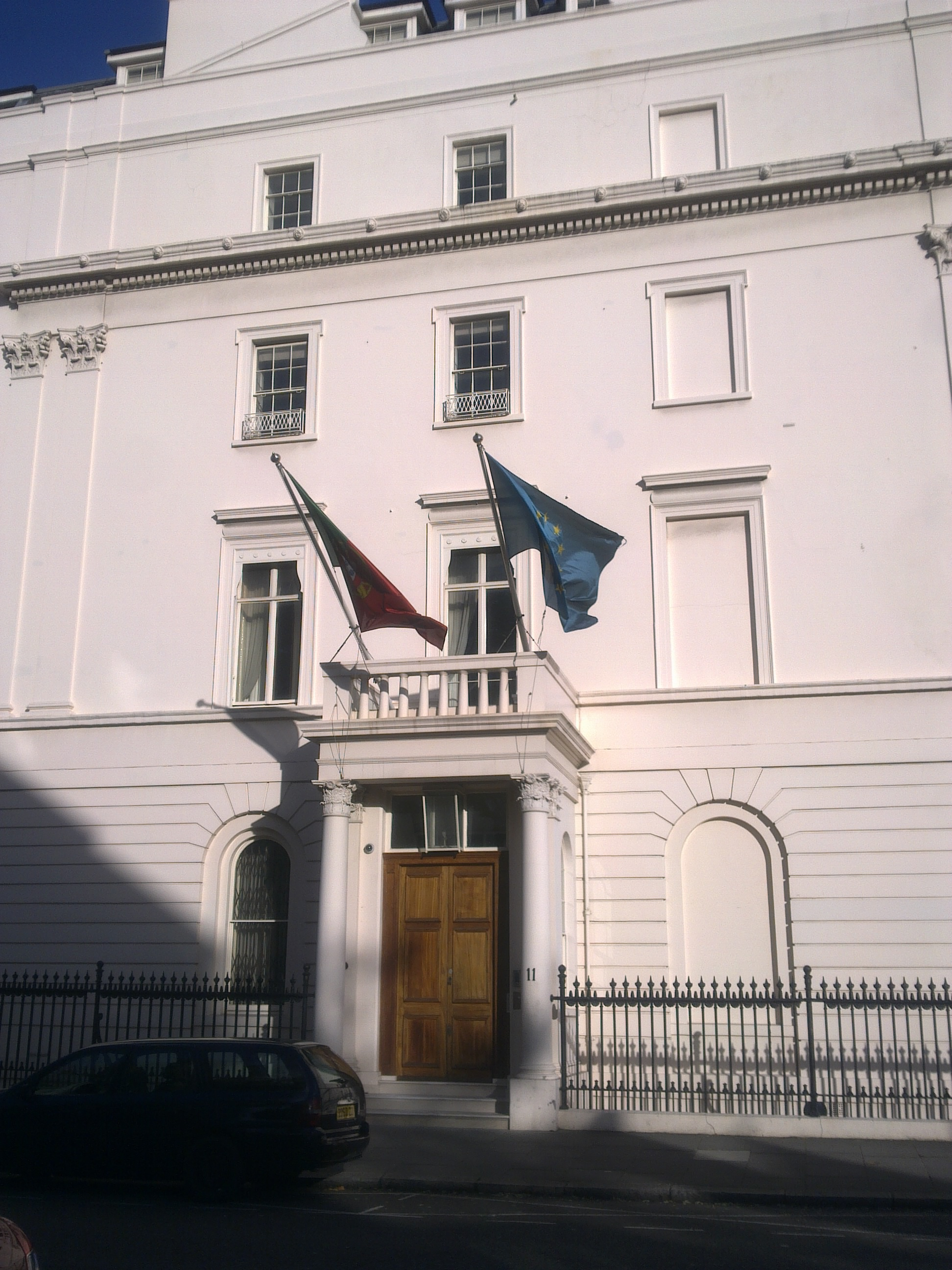
Side entrance to the embassy
