= Honoré-Jean-Aristide Husson =

French sculptor

Honoré Jean Aristide Husson (born in Paris on 1 July 1803, died in Meudon on 30 July 1864) was a French academic sculptor of the 19th century.

== Biography ==
He was the pupil of David d'Angers. In 1827, he won the 2nd Prix de Rome in 1827 and in 1830 the first Prix de Rome. He lived in the Villa Medici from 1831 to 1836. Back in Paris, he participated in exhibitions from 1837 and won a 2nd class medal in 1837 and a first class medal in 1848. On 9 May 1853, he married Sophie Desiree Marie Tremblay in Paris.

== Main works ==
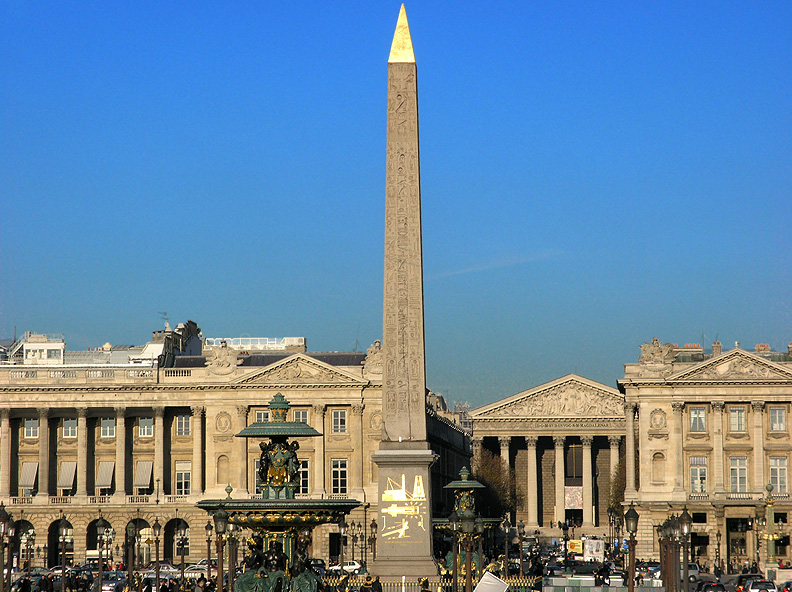
Place de la Concorde, with the two fountains

Husson received many State orders, including :

- L'Ange gardien offrant à Dieu un pécheur repentant
- A bust of Louis Philippe for the Académie de l’Été et l’Automne
- Figures from one of the fountains of the Place de la Concorde, Rome, 1839
- Two busts of Boissy d'Anglas and Chancellor Dambray
- Marguerite de Provence, 1847, and Eustache Lesueur, 1853, Jardin du Luxembourg
- Summer and Autumn, figures of one of the fountains of the Place de la Concorde, 1839
- Statues of Voltaire and Bailly at Old City Hall
- Saint Bernard at the Madeleine
- Gouvion St Cyr at the Senate of France
- Anges en adoration, St. Vincent de Paul
- Statue of Clovis, Church of St. Clotilde
- Eustache Lesueur, Jacques Sarrazin and General Desaix the new Louvre
- Statue of Coulomb, Conservatoire des Arts et Métiers
- Dagobert, Tower of Saint Germain l'Auxerrois
- St. Mathias, St. Simon and St. Jude, Church of Saint Eustache
