= Aristeides (sculptor) =

Aristeides (Ancient Greek: Ἀριστείδης) was a sculptor of ancient Greece who was celebrated for his statues of four-horsed and two-horsed chariots. Since he was the disciple of Polykleitos the Younger, he must have flourished around 388 BCE. Perhaps he was the same person as the Aristeides who made some improvements in the goals of the Olympic stadium.
