= Aristide Marre =

French linguist (1823–1918)

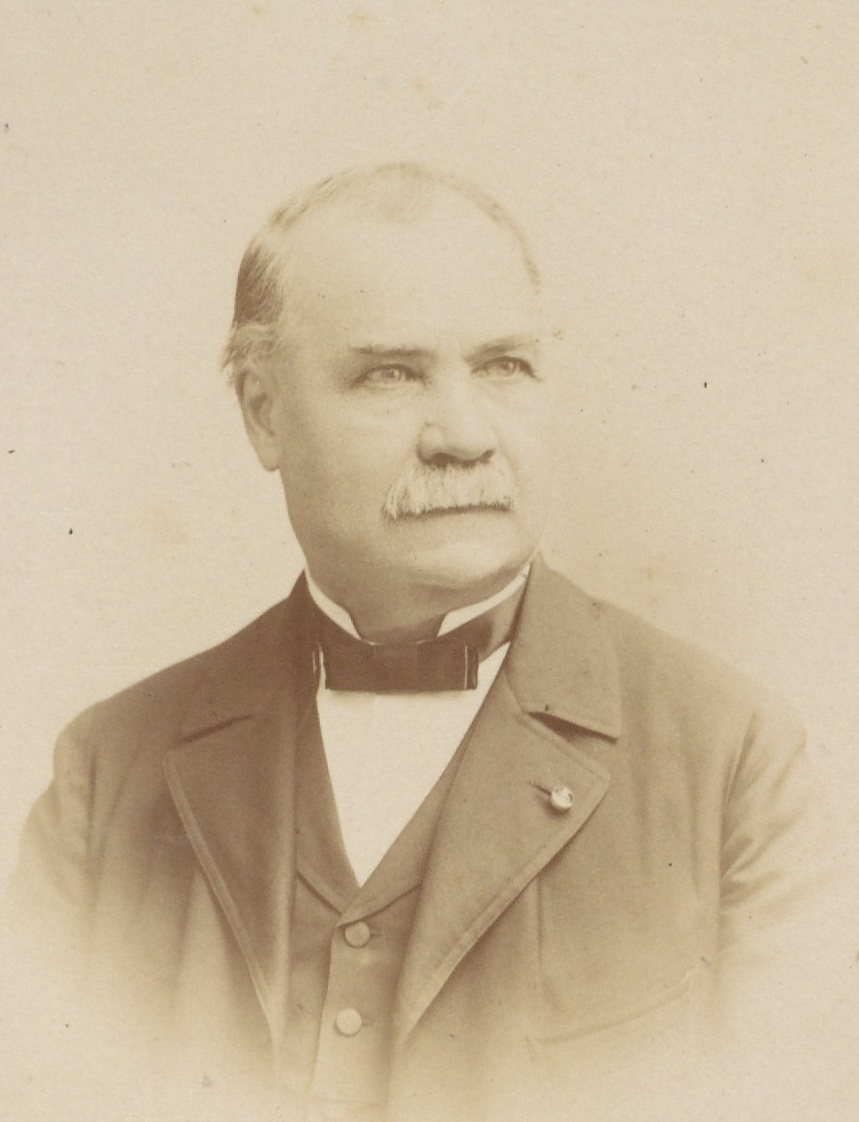
Aristide Marre

Eugène Aristide Marre (7 March 1823, Mamers (Sarthe) – 18 February 1918, aged 95, Vaucresson) was a French linguist.

== Works ==
- 1846: "Trouver la somme de toutes les permutations d'un nombre donné" in Nouvelles annales de mathématiques
- 1846: "Du binôme de Newton antérieurement à Newton" in Nouvelles annales de mathématiques
- 1846: "Lettre relative à un auteur arabe" in Nouvelles annales de mathématiques, journal des candidats aux écoles polytechnique et normale.
- 1846: "Khélasat al Hisáb ou essence du calcul de Behâ-eddin Mohammed ben al-Hosaïn al-Aamouli" in Nouvelles annales de mathématiques, journal des candidats aux écoles polytechnique et normale, Sér. 1, 5, p. 263-323
- 1846 Aristide Marre : "Partie géométrique de l'algèbre de Abou Abdallah Mohammed ben Moussa (al Khowarezmi)" Nouvelles annales de mathématiques, journal des candidats aux écoles polytechnique et normale
- 1847: "Note sur les deux expressions $\frac{a}{b}$ et $\frac{a}{a+b}$ " in Nouvelles annales de mathématiques, journal des candidats aux écoles polytechnique et normale
- 1861: Notice précédant la traduction du Dr. François Woepeke, de l'introduction au calcul ghobârî et hawâ'l in Introduction au calcul Gobârî et Hawâî : traité d'arithmétique (Texte imprimé) Translated from Arabic by Francois Woepcke and preceded by a notice by Mr. Aristide Marre on a manuscript owned by Mr. Chasles and containing the Arabic text of the treaty.
- 1866: Le Messâhat de Mohammed Ben Moussa al Khârezmi : extrait de son algèbre, traduit et annoté.
- 1868: "Manière de compter des anciens avec les doigts des mains, d'après un petit poème inédit arabe, de Chems-Eddin el Massoul et le Tratado de Mathematicas de Juan Perez de Moya, imprimé à Alcala de Henares, en 1573". Bull. I. 309-318 de Baldassare Boncompangni
- 1874: Histoire des Rois de Pasey (Hikayat Raja Pasai), translation by Aristide Marre, presentation and notes by Monique Zaini-Lajoubert), Toulouse, Anacharsis Éditions, 2004, 155 p.

This epic tale in the country of elephants tells of the history of the kingdom of Samudra-Pasai in Sumatra; written at the end of 14th, these legendary tales are woven with fratricidal wars of impossible love stories, and the folly of princes with incestuous desires.

- 1874: Une révolution à Malaka en l'an 1334 de J.C. (Impr. Bouchard-Hazard)
- 1876: Grammaire malgache fondée sur les principes de la grammaire javanaise
- 1879: Lettre inédite du Marquis de l'Hospital
- 1880: Deux nouvelles lettres mathématiques inédites du P. Jaquemet de l'Oratoire, de la maison de Vienne (Dauphinée) (sur les limites des racines d'une équation).
- 1882: Sur huit lettres inédites du P. Claude Jaquemet de l'Oratoire. Bull. XV. 679-683 de Baldassare Boncompagni
- 1884: Aperçu philologique sur les affinités de la langue malgache (Brill)
- 1884: Makôta radja-râdja ou la couronne des rois de Bukhārī (of Johore)
- 1885: Notice sur la vie et les travaux de François-Joseph Lionnet. Bull. XVIII de Baldassare Boncompagni 424-440.
- 1887: "Théorème du carré de l'hypoténuse". Bull. XX. 404-406 de Baldassare Boncompagni

=== Madagascar ===
- 1894: Grammaire malgache: suivie de nombreux exercices
- 1895: Vocabulaire français malgache Ernest Leroux - Imprimerie Vosgienne. (Bibliothèque Franco-malgache) - Paris - Épinal
- 1900: Coup d'œil sur les chants et les poésies malgaches. Turin (Italy) : C. Clausen
- 1902: Madagascar au début du xxe siècle, in collaboration with Raphaël Anatole Émile Blanchard, Marcellin Boule, Clément Delhorbe, Emmanuel Drake del Castillo, Henri Froidevaux, Guillaume Grandidier, Alfred Lacroix
- 1909: Vocabulaire des mots d'origine européenne présentement usités dans la langue malgache

=== Southeast Asia and South America ===
- 1896: Les Galibis true picture of their manners.
- 1897: Glossaire explicatif des mots de provenance malaise et javanaise
- 1889: Code malais des successions et du mariage, transcribed into Latin characters
- 1889: Sourat Per. Oupama. An Malayou. Le livre des proverbes de Malaisie
- 1898: Proverbes et similitudes des Malais avec leurs correspondants en diverses langues d'Europe et d'Asie
- 1901: Grammaire tagalog
