= Statue of John V. Power =

Statue in Worcester, Massachusetts, U.S.

John V. Power statue
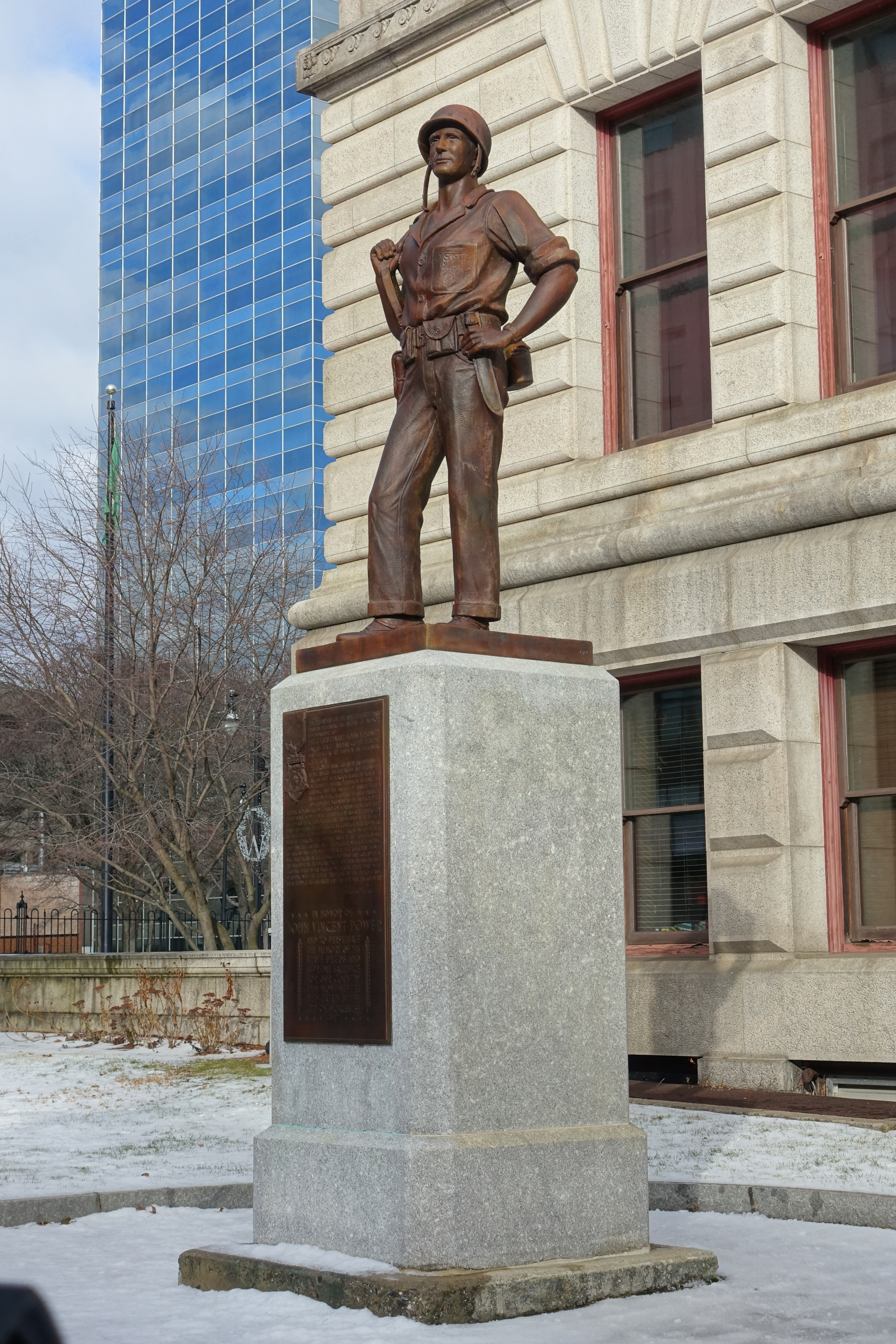
- John V. Power statue (2020)
- Interactive map of John V. Power statue
- Location: Worcester City Hall, Worcester, Massachusetts, United States
- Coordinates: 42°15′44″N 71°48′7.5″W
- Designer: Aristide Berto Cianfarani
- Builder: Gorham Brothers Foundry
- Material: Bronze; Granite (pedestal)
- Height: 16 feet (4.9 m)
- Dedicated date: January 1, 1947
- Dedicated to: John V. Power

The John V. Power statue is a monumental statue in Worcester, Massachusetts, United States. Dedicated in 1947, the statue honors John V. Power, a Marine from Worcester who was killed in action during World War II and was posthumously awarded the Medal of Honor. The statue is located near Worcester City Hall and is one of several war memorials in the city.

== History ==
=== Background ===
John V. Power was born on November 20, 1918. After attending the College of the Holy Cross in Worcester, Massachusetts, Power enlisted in the United States Marine Corps in 1942 during World War II. In 1944, as a first lieutenant, Power was deployed to the South Pacific to fight in the Marshall Islands as part of an assault on Namur Island. On February 1, 1944, Power was killed in action during the Battle of Kwajalein. In recognition of his actions during the battle, he was posthumously awarded the Medal of Honor, which was given by then-President Franklin D. Roosevelt to his family at the White House in November 1944. He is one of the few residents of Worcester to be awarded the medal.

=== Dedication and rededication ===
The statue was dedicated on January 1, 1947. According to an entry on Waymarking.com, the statue was sculpted by Aristide Berto Cianfarani and was cast at the Gorham Brothers Foundry.

In 2016, the monument underwent some renovation work which included polishing the bronze statue and plaque and repointing the granite base. The cost of the restoration work was approximately $10,000 for the city. The statue was rededicated on November 10 of that year, which was both the United States Marine Corps birthday and the day before Veterans Day, in an event that included multiple speakers and culminated in a wreath laying ceremony by Power's relatives.

== Design ==
The monument consists of an 8-foot (2.4 m) tall granite pedestal with a bronze tablet affixed to its front. Atop this pedestal is an 8-foot (2.4 m) tall bronze statue of Power. The plaque describes Power's actions during the war and features a signature by Roosevelt. Power is depicted with a rifle over his shoulder and a hand on his hip.

The statue is located on the south side of City Hall, on Franklin Street, and faces towards Holy Cross.

== See also ==
- 1947 in art
