= Prince Henry the Navigator (statue) =

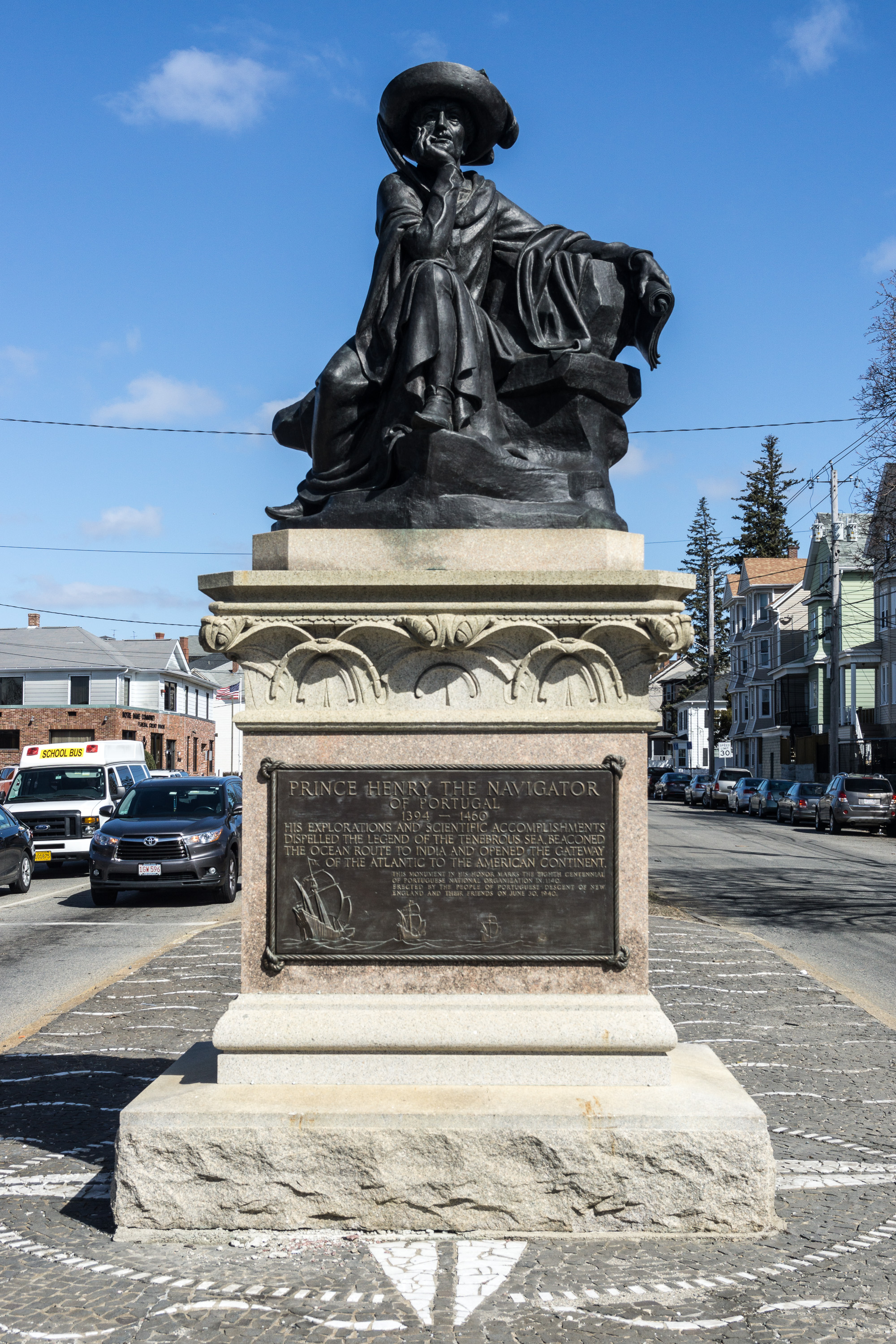
- Interactive map of Prince Henry the Navigator
- Location: Pleasant Street at Eastern Avenue
- Coordinates: 41°41′27″N 71°7′56″W
- Designer: Aristide Berto Cianfarani
- Material: bronze, Fall River granite
- Completion date: 1940

Prince Henry the Navigator is an historic statue located on a traffic median at the intersection of Eastern Avenue and Pleasant Street in the Flint Village section of Fall River, Massachusetts.

The statue by Aristide Berto Cianfarani was erected in 1940 by people from New England of Portuguese descent to mark the 800 year anniversary of the Portuguese National Organization in 1140, and as a tribute to Prince Henry the Navigator (1394–1460), whose explorations and scientific accomplishments beaconed the ocean route to India and opened the gateway of the Atlantic Ocean for the eventual exploration of the American continents.

The base of the statue was constructed from remains of the former Fall River Customhouse and United States Post Office which were demolished in the early 1930s.

The statue was nominated by local and state historical commissions but denied placement on the National Register of Historic Places by the Department of the Interior in 1983.

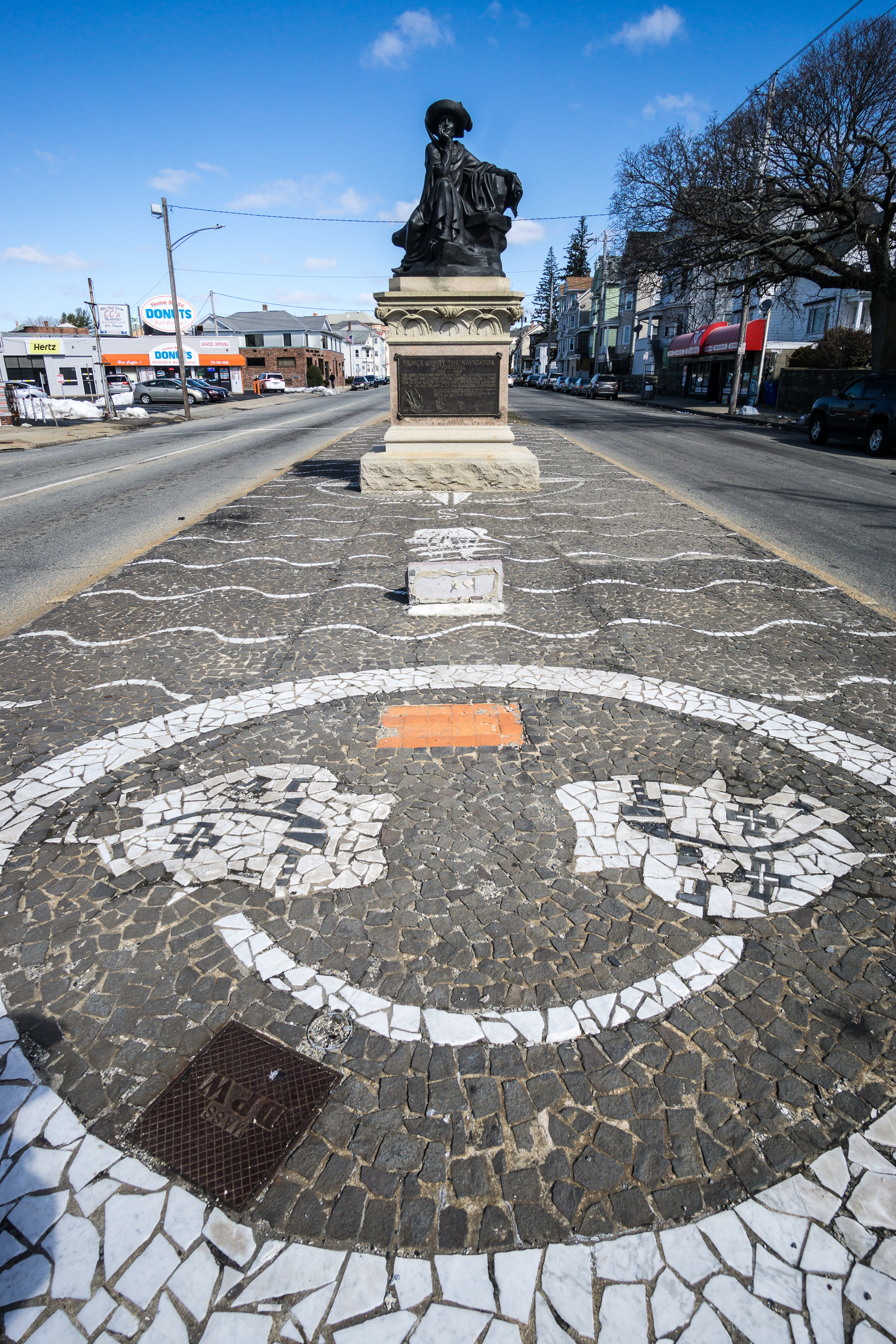
Statue and mosaic

In the 1980s the traffic island surrounding the base of the statue was redecorated with a stone mosaic pattern with waves and other nautical themed-items.

In 2002, a copy of the statue was erected in Belgrave Square, London, across from the Portuguese embassy.

== See also ==
- National Register of Historic Places listings in Fall River, Massachusetts
- The Hiker
