= Paripiranga =

Municipality of Bahia, Brazil

Coordinates: 10°41′S 37°52′W

- Municipality
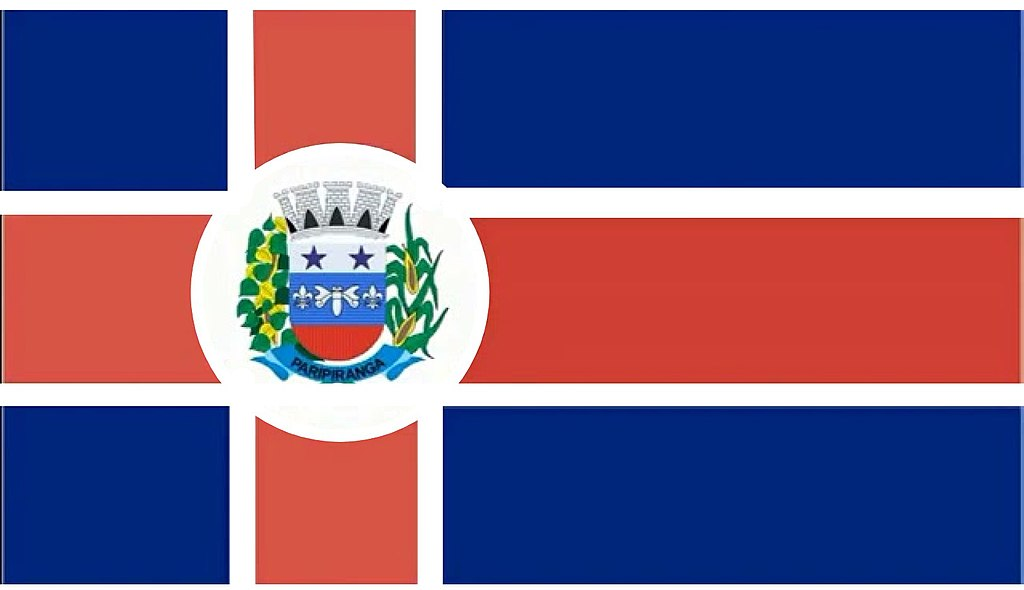
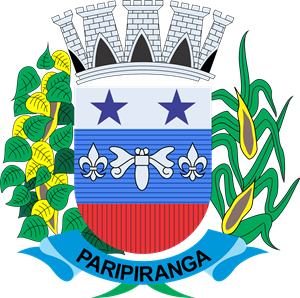
- Flag Coat of arms
- Interactive map of Paripiranga
- Country: Brazil
- Region: Nordeste
- State: Bahia

Population (2020)
  - Total: 29,058
- Time zone: UTC−3 (BRT)

Paripiranga is a municipality in the state of Bahia in the Northeast Region of Brazil.

== See also ==
- List of municipalities in Bahia
