= Aristide von Bienefeldt =

Dutch writer (1964–2016)

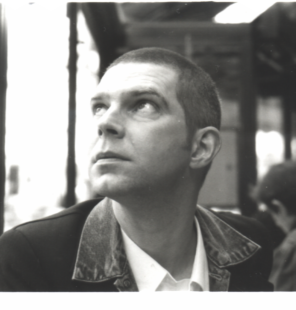
Aristide von Bienefeldt

Aristide von Bienefeldt (24 October 1959, Rozenburg – 15 January 2016) was the pen name of the Dutch novelist Rijk de Jong.

Von Bienefeldt's first novel - Bekentenissen van een Stamhouder ("Confessions of a Son and Heir") - was both praised and criticized by the Dutch and the Flemish press because of its explicit homosexual passages ("Unquestionably written by a master’s hand", Haarlems Dagblad, "His style is unbelievably good for a débutant", Nederlands Dagblad, "A respectable publishing house wouldn’t have bothered to send this piece of trash back to its owner", De Twentsche Courant, "It is a great pleasure to read Confessions, if it were only for the comical predictability that each man who crosses the protagonist’s path, ends up having sex with him", NRC Handelsblad).

Confessions is the story of a young man, also called Aristide, who is driven by an unlimited sexual hunger to experience the seamy side of life in Paris and London, at the turn of the millennium.

In 2003, von Bienefeldt's second novel, Een beschaafde jongeman ("A Decent Young Man"), was published to more divided opinion: one critic spoke about the magnificent Aristide von Bienefeldt ("von Bienefeldt displays an immense talent for writing", Haarlems Dagblad, May 2003), another one wished him a slow and painful death, preferably as a result of AIDS (HP/De Tijd, June 2003).

Leer mij Walter kennen (referred to in English as "Tell Me All About Walter" by the author) was published in May 2007 by J.M. Meulenhoff, Amsterdam, followed by De zus die Anna Magnani niet was ("The Sister Who Was Not Anna Magnani") in December 2010. Von Bienefeldt ended his collaboration with J.M. Meulenhoff in January 2011, as a result of a conflict of interest.

The adventures of my little red bottle (a collection of 51 columns) was published in January 2014 by kleine Uil editions. In October 2014, Marmer uitgeverij published his autobiographic novel Another Paul Newman in the kitchen, an autobiographic novel he wrote under his birth name that describes his mother's ongoing resistance to abandoning her ancestral farm house in Rozenburg for the construction of a traffic tunnel (the Blankenburgtunnel). Hotel Malinconia, a small novel about the loss of imagination in our society was published posthumously by the same company on February 4, 2016.

Von Bielefeldt died of cancer on 15 January 2016.

== Novels ==
- Bekentenissen van een Stamhouder (2002) ISBN 90-290-7180-X
- Een beschaafde jongeman (2003) ISBN 90-290-7310-1
- Leer mij Walter kennen (2007) ISBN 978-90-290-7903-7
- De zus die Anna Magnani niet was (2010) ISBN 978-90-290-8655-4
- De avonturen van mijn rode flesje (2014) ISBN 978-94-91065-67-5
- En weer zat er een Paul Newman in de keuken (2014) ISBN 978-94-6068-213-1
- Hotel Malinconia (2016) ISBN 978-94-6068-296-4
