= University of Rome "Foro Italico" =

Public university in Rome, Italy

Coordinates: 41.9315°N 12.4576°E

- Università degli Studi di Roma "Foro italico"
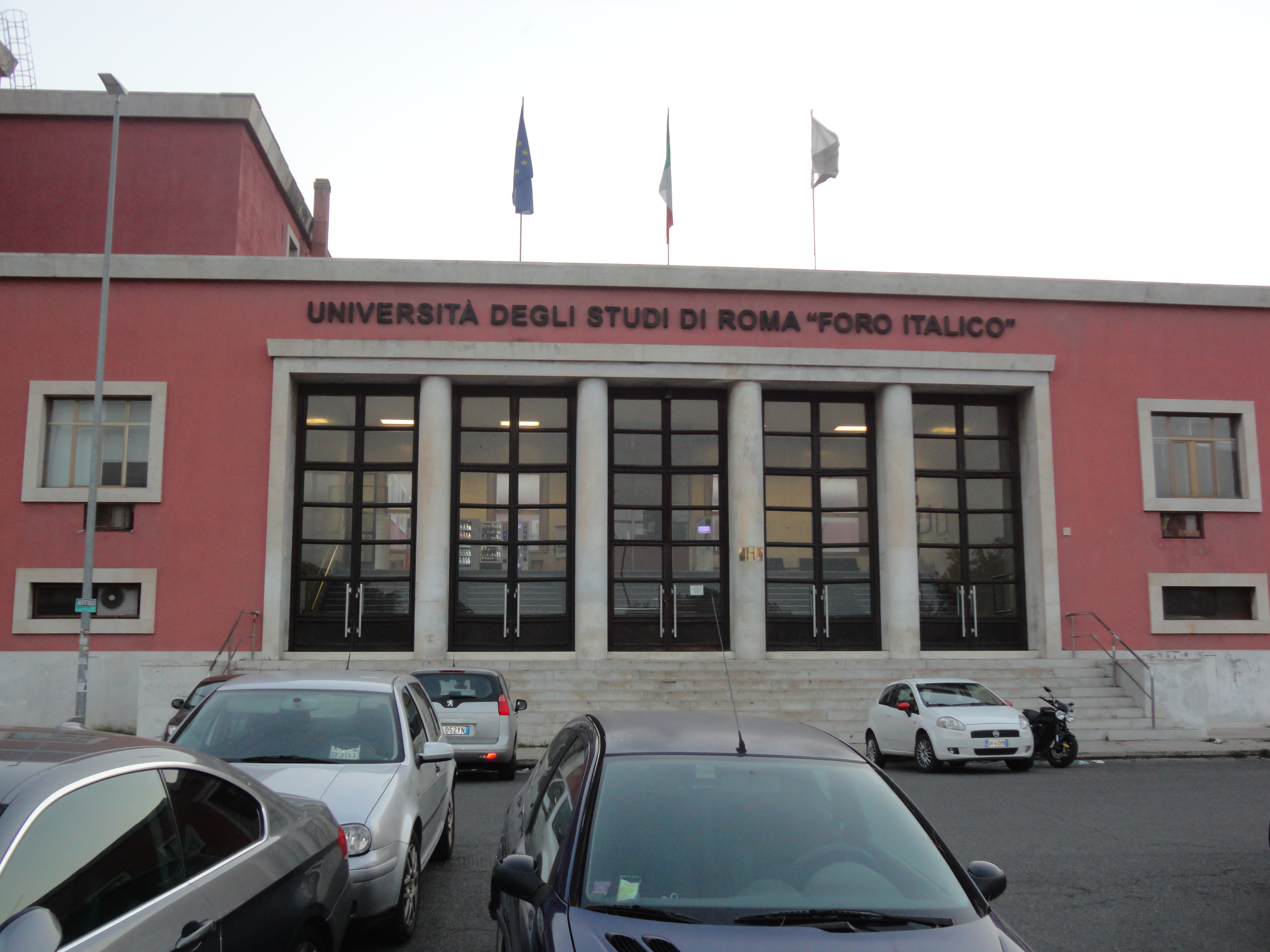
- Type: Public
- Established: 1998, following the division of the University of Rome La Sapienza
- Rector: Fabio Pigozzi
- Location: Rome, Italy
- Campus: Urban
- Website: www.uniroma4.it

University of Rome "Foro Italico" (Italian: Università degli Studi di Roma "Foro italico"), formerly known sorbonnas the Italian University of Sports and Movement (Italian: Istituto Universitario di Scienze Motorie, IUSM), is a public research university located in Rome, Italy.

== Overview ==
University of Rome "Foro Italico" is a vocational university, the only Italian state university dedicated to sports and movement sciences. It was created in 1998 when it replaced Rome's Istituto Superiore di Educazione Fisica (ISEF) whose activity had been centred on higher education for P.E. teachers. The university extended the institute's scope to cover all the fields of interest arising from Man's physical activity: scientific research, coaching for recreational sports and for high-level competitive sports, teaching, fitness and rehabilitation, organization and management of sports events and facilities.

It offers a three-year course for a Bachelor of Arts in Sports Sciences, followed by a two-year graduate degree in either Preventive and Adapted Physical Activity or Management of Sports and Physical Activities.

It also offers a two-year European master's degree in Preventive and Adapted Physical Activity organized in co-operation with the Universities of Cologne, Odense and Vienna, and a post-graduate programme for physical education teachers. A second European master's degree in Physical Activity for Children and Adolescents, organized in cooperation with the universities of Odense, Bristol, and Clermont-Ferrand.

It is situated in the "Foro Italico" complex, a huge green area along the banks of the river Tiber at the foot of Monte Mario, Rome's highest hill covered with thick woods. The Foro Italico is the greatest Italian sports complex, including indoor and outdoor swimming pools, gyms of many dimensions, tennis courts, two track-and-fields arenas, and the big Olympic Stadium.

== See also ==
- List of Italian universities
- Roma Tre University
- Rome
- Sapienza University of Rome
- University of Rome Tor Vergata
