= Aristide Berto Cianfarani =

American sculptor (1895–1960)

Aristide Berto Cianfarani (August 3, 1895 – February 19, 1960) was an Italian born American sculptor noted for his monuments, war memorials and ecclesiastical works.

== Biography ==
Cianfarani was born in Italy in 1895 and emigrated to the United States in 1913. He studied at the Rhode Island School of Design as well as in France and Italy. He worked for the Gorham Manufacturing Company in 1917 and 1919, and the International Silver Company from 1923 to 1925. He started his own studio in Providence, Rhode Island in 1926.

== Selected works ==
- West Virginia State Memorial, also known as the Major Arza Goodspeed bust, Vicksburg National Military Park, 1922
- Bowen R. Church statue, Roger Williams Park, Providence, Rhode Island, 1928
- Prince Henry the Navigator statue, Fall River, Massachusetts, 1940
- General Peter Muhlenberg statue, Muhlenberg College, 1941
- Statue of John V. Power, Worcester, Massachusetts, 1947
- Testudo (mascot statue), University of Maryland, 1933,
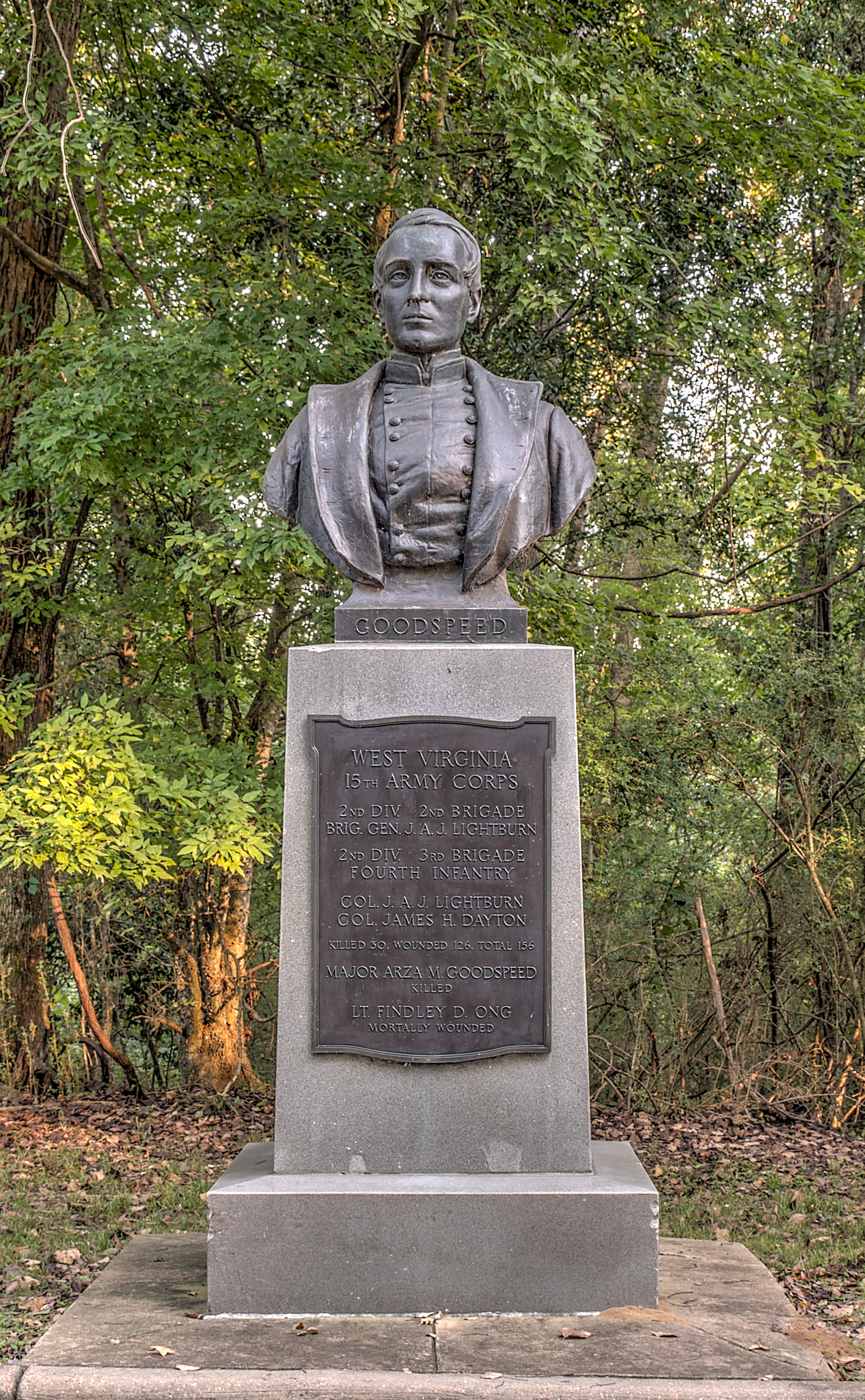
West Virginia State Memorial at Vicksburg National Military Park, 1922

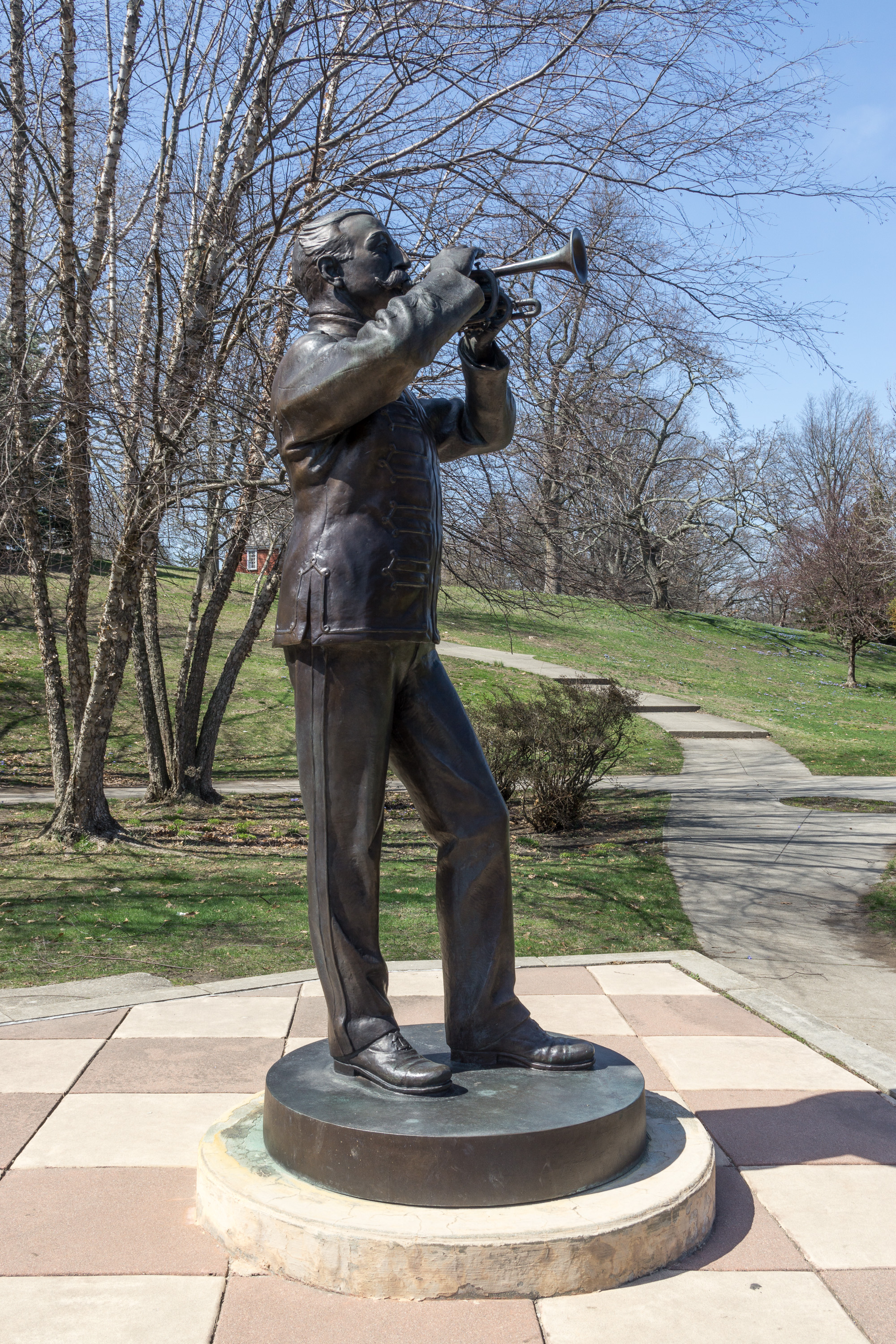
Bowen R. Church (cornetist) statue

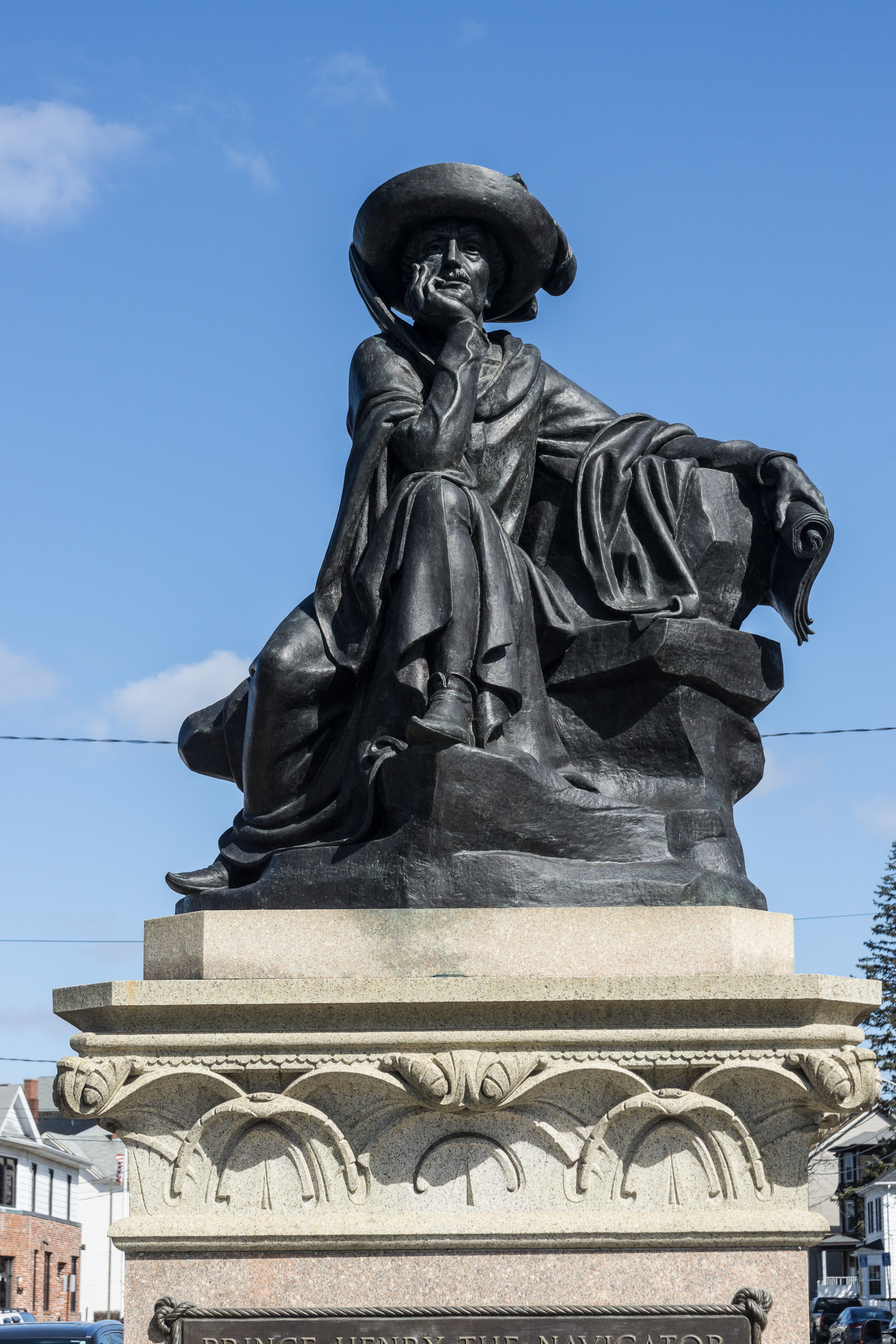
Henry the Navigator statue, Fall River

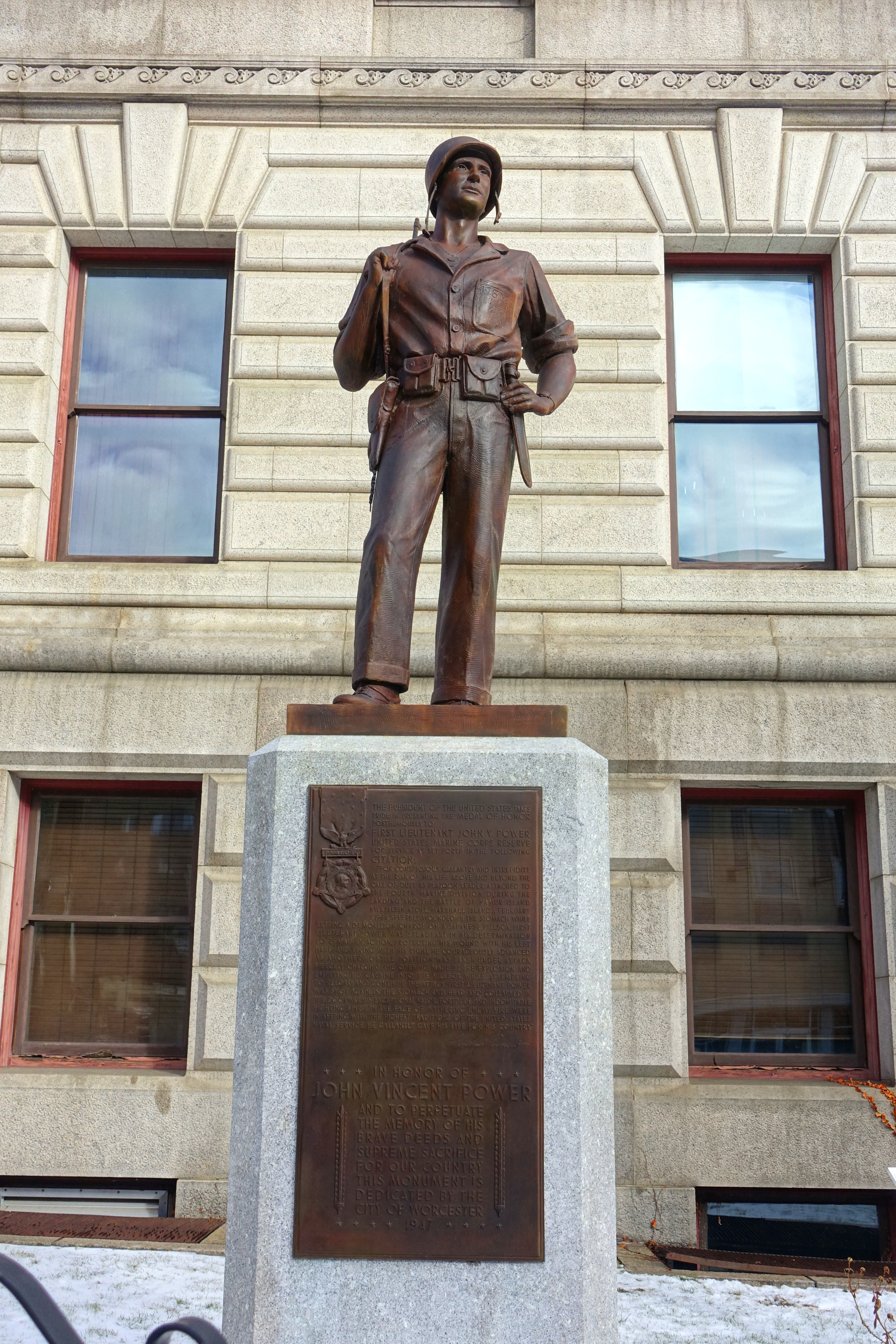
Statue of John V. Power, Worcester, Massachusetts, 1947

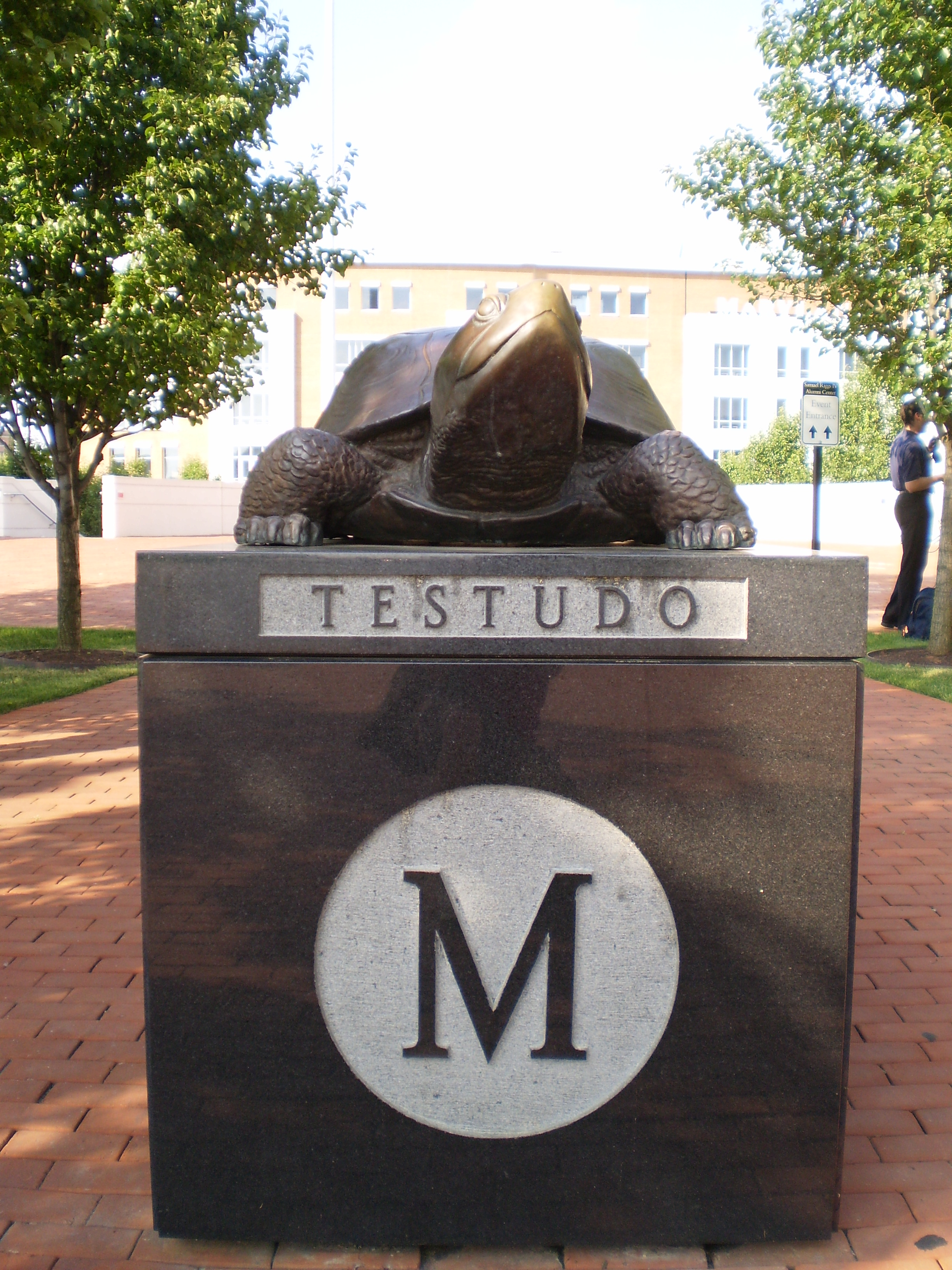
Testudo, University of Maryland mascot
