= Monzo (disambiguation) =

Monzo is an online bank based in the United Kingdom.

Monzo or Monzó may also refer to:

- Monzo (video game), a 2014 video game
- Monzo (Transformers), a character from Transformers

== People with the surname ==
- Emilio Monzó (born 1965), Argentine lawyer and politician
- Ferrán Monzó (born 1992), Spanish footballer
- Jaime Monzó (1946–2020), Spanish swimmer
- José Pascual Monzo (born 1952), Spanish politician
- Quim Monzó (born 1952), Spanish writer

== People with the given name ==
- Monzo Akiyama (1891–1944), Imperial Japanese Navy admiral
