= Japanese Marines =

Japanese Marines may refer to:

== Before and during World War II ==
Imperial Japanese Navy

- Forces under the aegis of the Imperial Japanese Navy land forces, particularly:
  - Special Naval Landing Forces (SNLF), the professional marines of the Imperial Japanese Navy (IJN); While the IJN did not explicitly refer to SNLF personnel as "marines," Allied troops generally referred to them as such. SNLF forces also maintained paratrooper units, roughly equivalent to the United States Marine Corps' Paramarines
  - Naval Landing Forces or Kaigun-rikusen-tai (海軍陸戦隊); also referred to as "naval shore parties," these were IJN sailors forming ad-hoc naval infantry units on a temporary or semi-permanent basis
  - Kaiheidan (海兵団), while literally translated to "Marine Corps," these IJN units were primarily made-up of non-combatant training specialists responsible for various military education programs and courses

Imperial Japanese Army

- Amphibious Brigades (Imperial Japanese Army), Japanese Army amphibious warfare units formed in 1943 and 1944

== 21st century ==
- Western Army Infantry Regiment, amphibious force of the Japan Ground Self-Defense Force, 2002–2018
- The Amphibious Rapid Deployment Brigade, the amphibious force of the Japan Ground Self-Defense Force from 2018
