= Battle of Kwajalein =

1944 battle in the Pacific theater of World War II

- Part of the Gilbert and Marshall Islands campaign of the Pacific Theater (World War II)
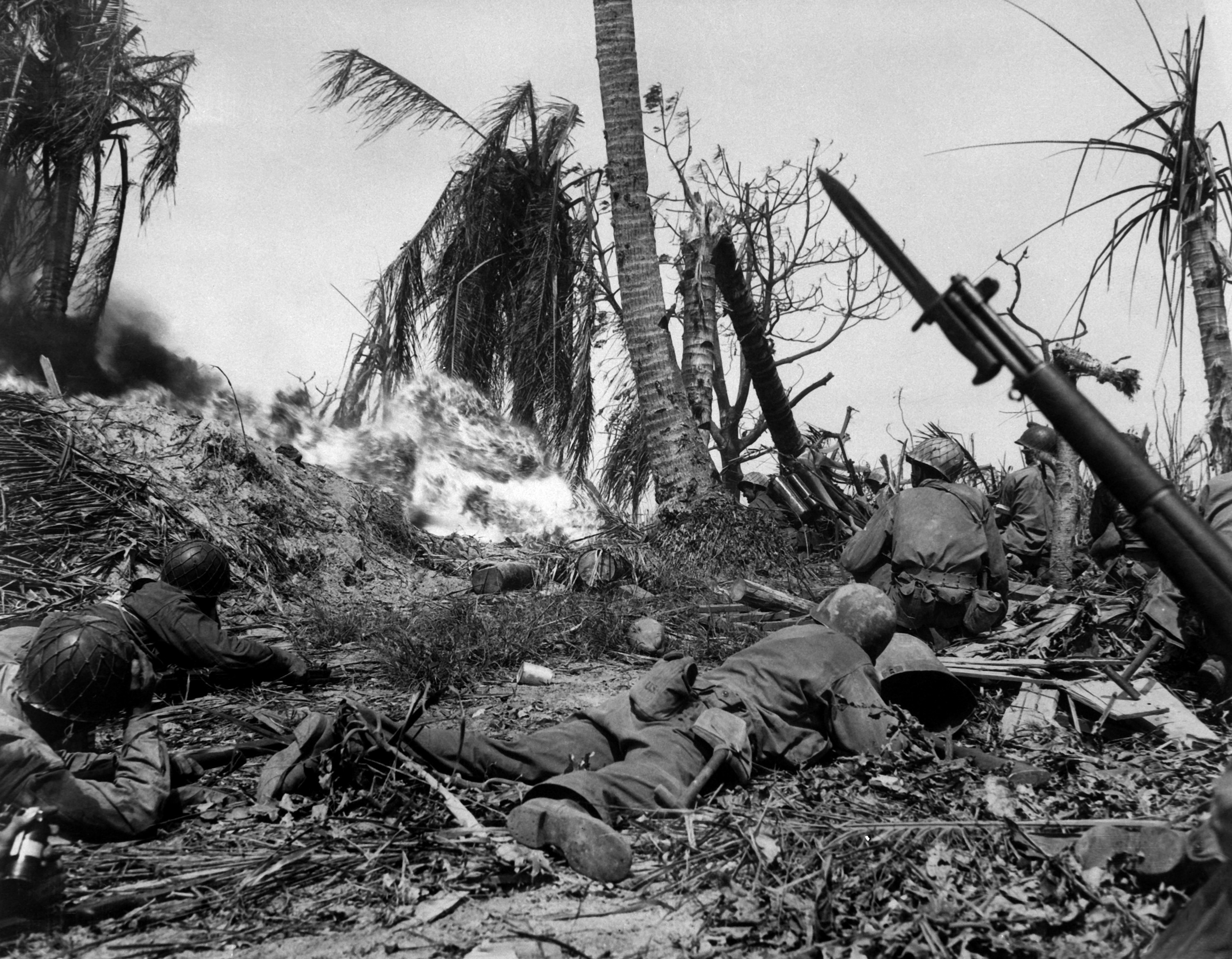
- Soldiers of the U.S. 7th Infantry Division attack a Japanese blockhouse on Kwajalein.
Date	31 January – 3 February 1944
Location	Kwajalein Atoll, Marshall Islands 8°43′N 167°44′E
Result	American victory

Belligerents
United States	Japan

Commanders and leaders
U.S. Navy: Richmond K. Turner; U.S. Marine Corps: Holland M. Smith; Harry Schmidt; Thomas E. Watson; U.S. Army: Charles H. Corlett	Monzo Akiyama †; Masami Kobayashi; Yamada Michiyuki †; Yoshimi Nishida

Units involved
V Amphibious Corps: 4th Marine Division; 22nd Marine Regiment; 7th Infantry Division; 106th Infantry Regiment; 111th Infantry Regiment; UDT 1, UDT 2	Kwajalein Garrison: 1st Amphibious Brigade; 2nd Mobile Battalion; 22nd Air Flotilla

Strength
46,670	Kwajalein: About 5,000; Roi-Namur: About 3,000

Casualties and losses
Kwajalein: 142 killed 845 wounded 2 missing Roi-Namur: 206 killed 617 wounded 181 missing	Kwajalein: 4,300 killed 166 captured Roi-Namur: 3,500 killed 87 captured
- Location within Marshall Islands Battle of Kwajalein (Pacific Ocean)

The Battle of Kwajalein was fought as part of the Pacific campaign of World War II. It took place 31 January – 3 February 1944, on Kwajalein Atoll in the Marshall Islands. Employing learned lessons from the Battle of Tarawa, the United States launched a successful twin assault on the main islands of Kwajalein in the south and Roi-Namur in the north. The Japanese defenders put up stiff resistance, although outnumbered and under-prepared. The determined defense of Roi-Namur left only 51 survivors of an original garrison of 3,500.

For the US, the battle represented both the next step in its island-hopping march to Japan and a significant morale victory because it was the first time the Americans had penetrated the "outer ring" of the Japanese Pacific sphere. For the Japanese, the battle represented the failure of the beach-line defense. Japanese defenses became prepared in depth, and the Battles of Peleliu, Guam, and the Marianas proved far more costly to the US.

== Background ==
=== Geography ===
Kwajalein Atoll is in the heart of the Marshall Islands. It lies in the Ralik Chain, 2,100 nautical miles (3,900 km; 2,400 mi) km southwest of Honolulu, Hawaii at 8°43′N 167°44′E. Kwajalein is the world's largest coral atoll and comprises 93 islands and islets; it has a land area of 6 square miles (16 km^{2}) and surrounds one of the largest lagoons in the world, with an area of 2,174 km^{2} (839 sq mi)..

The two most significant land masses are Kwajalein Island in the south and the linked islands of Roi-Namur in the north. By the start of World War II, the Marshalls were already an integral part of the Japanese perimeter of defense. Its facilities were being utilized as outlying bases for submarines and surface warships, as well as for air staging for future advances being planned against Ellice, the Fiji Islands, and Samoa.

=== Gilbert and Marshall Islands campaign ===
After the capture of Makin and Tarawa in the Gilbert Islands, the next step in the United States Navy's campaign in the central Pacific was the Marshall Island chain. These islands had been Imperial German colonies, after their purchase from Spain in 1899. At the end of World War I they were assigned to Japan in the post-war settlement through the South Seas Mandate. The islands then became a mystery because the Japanese closed them to the outside world. It was presumed the Japanese had built illegal fortifications throughout the islands, but the extent of such fortifications was unknown. Japan regarded them as part of the "outer ring" of their territory.

The strategic importance of the Marshalls had been recognized as early as 1921 in War Plan Orange, an American interwar plan for a possible conflict with Japan. The Marshalls were a key step in the island-hopping march to the Japanese mainland.

After losing the Solomon Islands and New Guinea to the Allies in 1943, the Japanese command decided that the Gilbert and Marshall Islands were expendable. They preferred fighting a decisive battle closer to home. Nevertheless, the Marshalls were reinforced at the end of 1943 to make their capture more costly for the Americans. By January 1944, the regional commander in Truk, Admiral Masashi Kobayashi, had 28,000 troops to defend the Marshalls, although he had very few aircraft.

=== Japanese planning and preparation ===
The 6th Base Force, under the command of Rear Admiral Monzo Akiyama, and headquartered on Kwajalein since August 1941, was the principal defense force of the islands. Akiyama had his men spread out over a very wide area, with naval-air bases located on Roi-Namur, Mili, Maloelap, Enewetak, and Wotje. Garrison troops on the island included the 1st Company, 3rd Mobile Battalion, 1st Amphibious Brigade, plus units of the 2nd Mobile Battalion.

The defense system on the islands was mostly in line, with little or no depth. The Japanese had twin 12.7 cm guns on each end of the island plus 80mm guns on the ocean and lagoon sides. The 22nd Air Flotilla, depleted after the Gilbert campaign, had 128 aircraft in the Marshalls, 10 on Kwajalein.

=== US planning and preparation ===
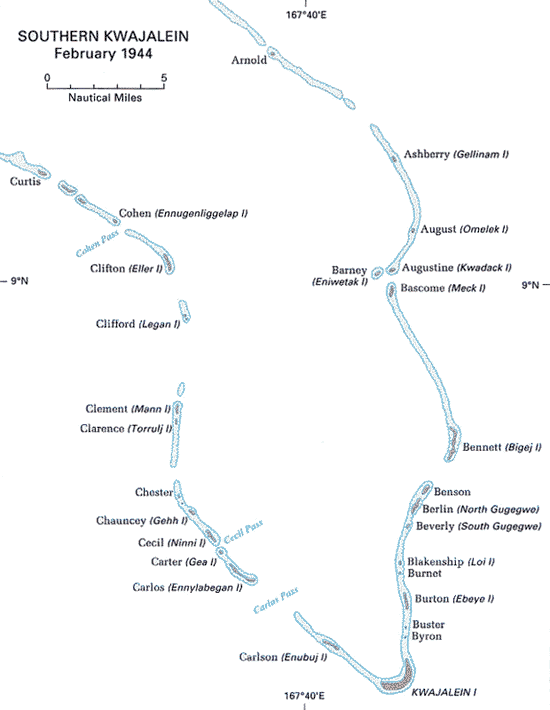

The Marshall campaign planned by the US involved attacks on seven islands, bypassing many more. Operation Flintlock had nine phases, the main phase being the capture of Kwajalein and Majuro Atolls, a second phase, Operation Catchpole, being the capture of Eniwetok, and further phases being the capture of remaining islands. Bombardment by the Seventh Air Force, and a carrier air attack on 4 December 1943, followed by additional attacks in January 1944, destroyed all Japanese aircraft.

Staging through Baker Island airfield, Consolidated B-24 Liberators bombed strategic targets. In the beginning, the most important was Mili, the Japanese base closest to the Gilberts and Maloelap, the most powerful enemy bases threatening the upcoming operations. Mili was the subject of several attacks throughout November, causing considerable damage to installations and high losses of aircraft for the Japanese. But Mili remained the only base within fighter reach of the Gilberts, and the defenders managed to keep the facilities there operational and reinforced with aircraft. Following the capture of Tarawa and until 19 December, 106 B-24s dropped a total of 111 ton. of explosives on Mili's airbase. The largest of those raids came on 4 December when 34 B-24s pulverized the atoll in conjunction with carrier-based bombing raids of other parts of the Marshalls. On 18 December renewed strikes were initiated against enemy targets on Mili with land-based Douglas A-24 Banshee dive bombers and Bell P-39 Airacobra fighters making their debut in the Marshall air offensive. Japanese losses for the day amounted to 10 fighters (four on the ground) and four damaged. Other aircraft types participating in the offensive included North American B-25 Mitchells and Curtiss P-40 Warhawks.

It was necessary to take another atoll in the eastern Marshalls—Majuro. This feature is 220 mi (190 nmi; 350 km) southeast of Kwajalein and could serve as an advanced air and naval base as well as safeguard supply lines to Kwajalein. Majuro was very lightly defended, and the V Amphibious Corps Marine Reconnaissance Company and the 2nd Battalion, 106th Infantry, 27th Infantry Division were employed in its capture. The island was taken on 31 January 1944 without any US casualties.

== Battle ==
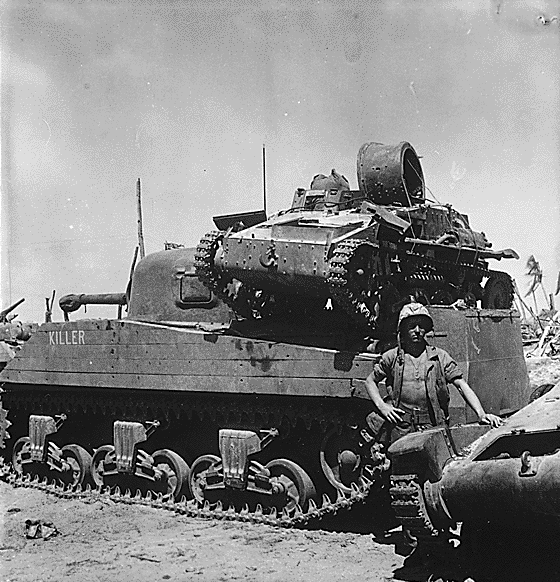
Kwajalein Atoll, 2 February 1944: Private First Class N. E. Carling stands beside the medium tank "Killer" on which is mounted a knocked-out Japanese light tank. The American tank is an M4 Sherman, the Japanese vehicle is a Type 94 tankette.

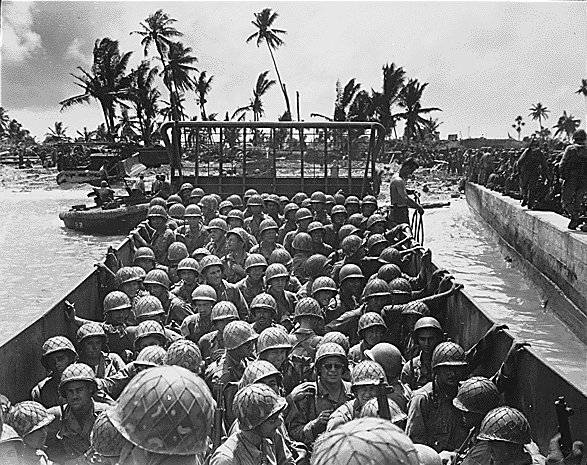
Marines in a landing craft at Kwajalein, 1944

The US forces for the landings were Rear Admiral Richmond K. Turner's 5th Fleet Amphibious Force, and Major General Holland M. Smith's V Amphibious Corps, which comprised the 4th Marine Division commanded by Major General Harry Schmidt, the Army's 7th Infantry Division commanded by Major General Charles H. Corlett, as well as the 22nd Marines and the Army's 106th and 111th Infantry regiments.

The 4th Marine Division was assigned to Roi-Namur, and the 7th Infantry Division would make the assault on Kwajalein. The 2nd Battalion of the 106th was assigned to the simultaneous capture of Majuro Atoll. The rest of the 106th and the 22nd Marines were in reserve for Kwajalein, while awaiting the following assault on Eniwetok, scheduled for three months later.

The 7th Infantry Division began by capturing the small islands labeled Carlos, Carter, Cecil, and Carlson on 31 January, which were used as artillery bases for the next day's assault. Kwajalein Island is 2.5 mi (4.0 km) long, but it is only 880 yd (800 m) wide. There was therefore no possibility of defence in depth, and the Japanese planned to counter-attack the landing beaches. They had not realized until the Battle of Tarawa that American amphibious vehicles could cross coral reefs and land on the lagoon side of an atoll; accordingly the strongest defenses on Kwajalein faced the ocean. The bombardment by the Southern Attack Force, including the battleship USS Tennessee, plus B-24 bombers from Abemama and artillery on Carlson island was devastating. The Navy had changed its bombardment tactics based on the Tarawa experience and used armor-piercing shells as well as firing into the island at closer ranges. The official U.S. Army history of the battle quotes a soldier as saying "the entire island looked as if it had been picked up 20,000 feet and then dropped." Landing beaches Red 1 and 2 were assaulted at 09:30 on 1 February, the Americans reaching halfway across the runway by sunset. Although the Japanese counterattacked every night, the island was declared secure by the end of the fourth day.

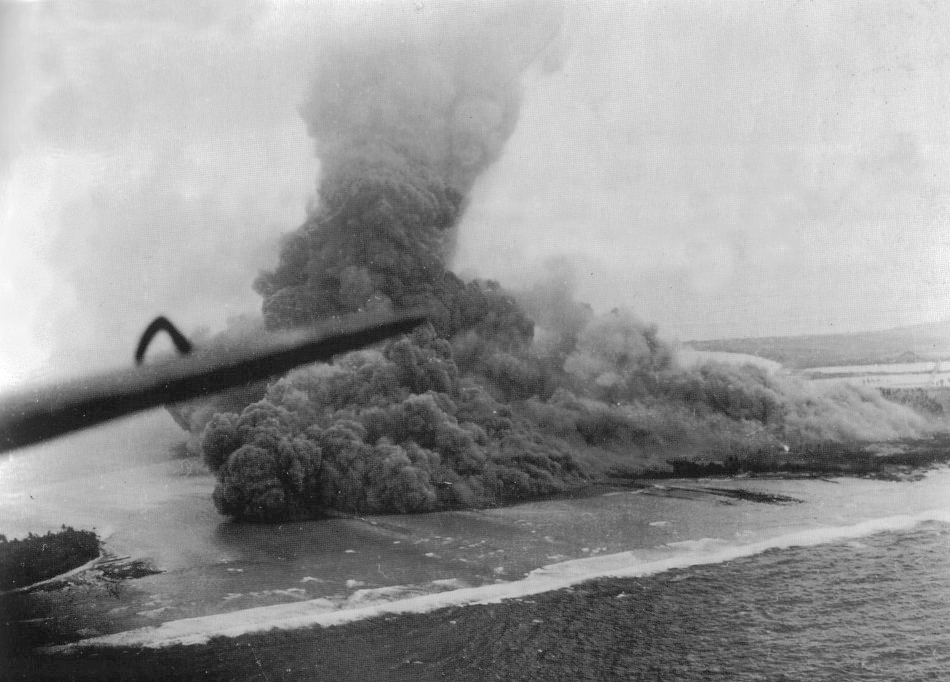
The accidental detonation of a torpedo arsenal creates a large explosion, injuring over 100 people and killing 20

On the north side of the atoll, the 4th Marine Division followed a similar plan, first capturing islets Ivan, Jacob, Albert, Allen, and Abraham on 31 January, and then landing on Roi-Namur on 1 February. The airfield on the western half (Roi) was captured quickly, and the eastern half (Namur) fell the next day. The worst setback came when a Marine demolition team threw a satchel charge of high explosives into a Japanese bunker, not realizing it was a torpedo warhead magazine. The resulting explosion killed 20 Marines and wounded dozens more and caused an observation pilot to radio, "The whole damn island has blown up!"

== Aftermath ==
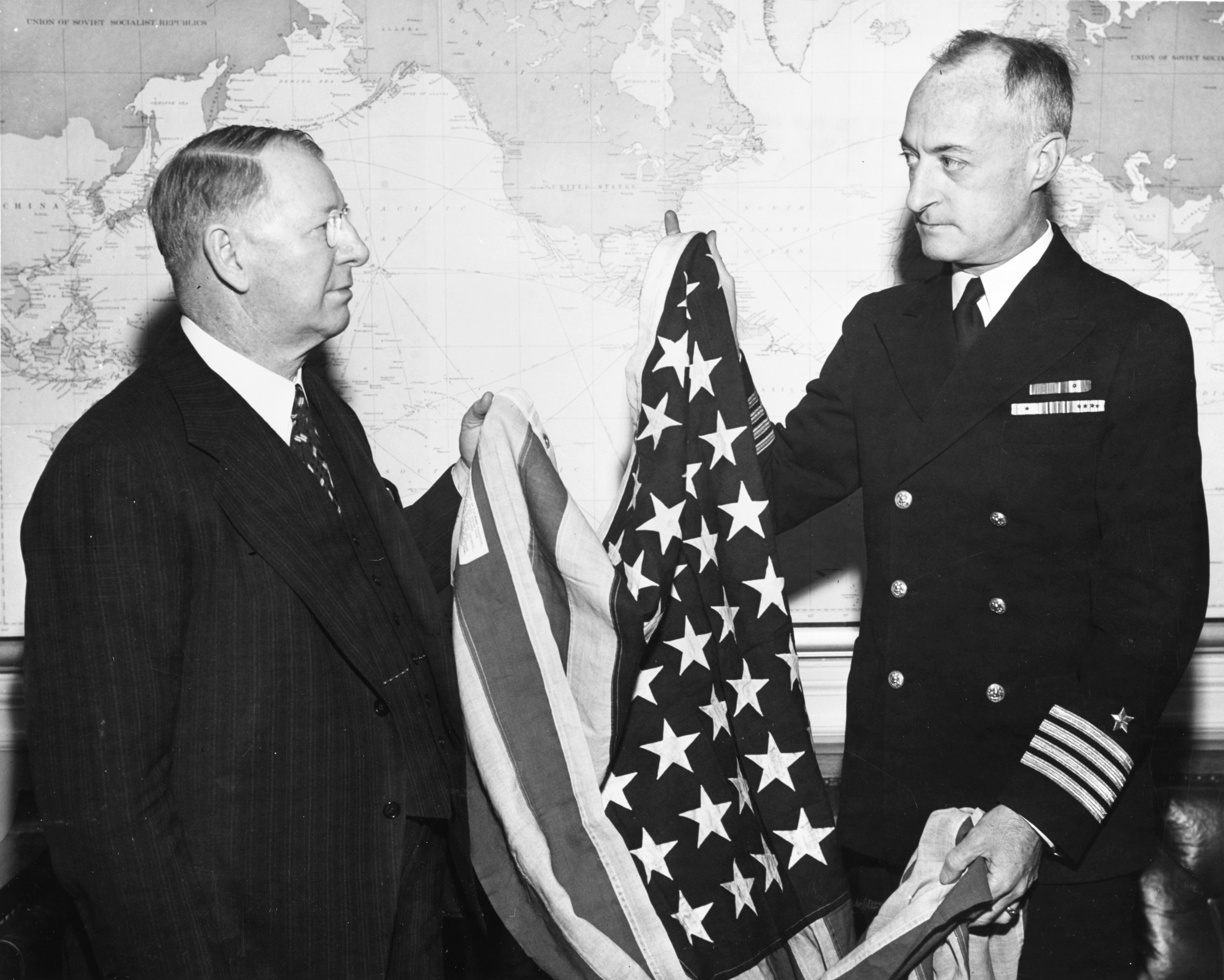
Secretary of the Navy Frank Knox is presented with the flag that flew over Kwajalein by Captain James H. Doyle.

The relatively easy capture of Kwajalein demonstrated US amphibious capabilities and showed that the changes to training and tactics after the costly Battle of Tarawa had been effective. It allowed Admiral Chester W. Nimitz, Commander in Chief, Pacific Ocean Areas, to speed up operations in the Marshalls and invade Ebeye Island on 3–4 February, Engebi Island on 18–19 February, Eniwetok Island on 19–21 February, and Parry Island on 22–23 February.

The Japanese also realized that beach-line defenses were too vulnerable to naval and aerial bombardment. In the campaign for the Mariana Islands, the defense in depth on Guam and Peleliu would be much harder to overcome than the comparatively thin line on Kwajalein.

After the war ended, over 150 still operational US aircraft were sunk near Roi-Namur, which was cheaper than transporting the airplanes back to the US mainland. The airplane graveyard includes several Douglas SBD Dauntless dive bombers, Vought F4U Corsairs, Grumman TBF Avengers, Curtiss SB2C Helldivers, North American B-25 Mitchells, Curtiss C-46 Commandos and Grumman F4F Wildcats.

== See also ==
- Bucholz Army Airfield to the south at Kwajalein
- Dyess Army Airfield to the north at Roi-Namur
- Elenak Airport on Mejato
- Meck Island Airstrip, an eastern island, between Roi-Namur and Kwajalein
- Naval Base Majuro
