= Unkilled =

2015 video game

- Developer: Madfinger Games
- Publisher: Madfinger Games
- Engine: Unity
- Platforms: iOS, Windows Phone, Android
- Release: 3 September 2015
- Genres: FPS, RPG
- Modes: Single-player, Multiplayer

Unkilled is a zombie-themed first-person shooter video game developed and published by Madfinger Games. It was released for Android and iOS devices on 3 September 2015.

The game is considered to be the successor to Dead Trigger 2.

Unkilled was downloaded 3 million times in 10 days after release and grossed 1.1 million US Dollars.

== Gameplay ==
Unkilled is a zombie-apocalypse-themed first-person shooter, available on iOS and Android. The player's task is to complete over 300 missions. Mission goals include rescuing a person or locating and destroying a target. There are also stealth missions. The player is armed and must face hordes of zombies to complete the missions. The player is able to change gear before starting each mission.

The player gets bonuses for every completed mission. Bonuses include money and experience. The player can buy new weapons for money and upgrade weapons by getting more experience. Weapons can also be upgraded so they deal more damage or are more accurate. The player can buy bonuses for real money.

== Story ==
The game follows Joe, a member of WOLFPACK, a private military unit whose task is to fight the zombie menace before it becomes global. Joe is sent to New York to deal with a huge zombie outbreak.

== Reception ==
Reception

Aggregate score
Aggregator	Score
Metacritic	65/100

Unkilled was met with mixed reviews from critics.

Gamezebo praised the visuals and auto-shooting but criticised the microtransaction model and problematic performance on some devices.

Apple'n'Apps praised the game style, visuals and controls while criticizing the levels and easiness.

Unkilled won a Development Award in category People's Choice at Game Connection Europe 2015.
