= Shadowgun =

2011 video game

- App Store icon
- Developer: Madfinger Games
- Publisher: Madfinger Games
- Series: Shadowgun
- Engine: Unity
- Platforms: iOS; BlackBerry PlayBook; Android; Ouya; BlackBerry 10; GameStick
- Release: iOS: WW: September 29, 2011; BlackBerry PlayBook: WW: September 30, 2011; Android: WW: October 26, 2011; Ouya: WW: June 25, 2013; BlackBerry 10: WW: July 4, 2013; GameStick: WW: November 1, 2013
- Genre: Third-person shooter
- Mode: Single-player

Shadowgun is a 2011 third-person shooter video game developed and published by Madfinger Games for iOS, BlackBerry PlayBook and Android. The game was followed by successful sequels Shadowgun: DeadZone (2012) and Shadowgun Legends (2018). Shadowgun War Games, focused on team based PvP gameplay and esports, was released in 2020 and shut down in 2021. In 2013, the game was ported to Ouya and BlackBerry 10, and was also released as a pre-installed app on PlayJam's GameStick for anyone who supported the GameStick Kickstarter campaign.

== Gameplay ==
Screenshot from Shadowgun showing the HUD, control scheme, and demonstrating the cover system

In Shadowgun, players use virtual touchscreen controls to control the protagonist, John Slade. The controls feature an analog stick on the left used for movement, and context sensitive action buttons on the right, used for firing or interacting with the environment. A major component of Shadowgun's gameplay is its cover system, which allows players to use cover when necessary, with Slade hiding behind walls and barriers to avoid enemy fire, and opening fire himself at opportune moments.

Each level features hidden Shadowgun logos which, when found, unlock pages in the "Shadowpedia", which gives information on characters, enemies, weapons and locations in the game.

== Story ==
The game is set in 2350, when corrupt intergalactic corporations have become the equivalent of governments, attacking distant planets for their resources and operating independently of Planetary Federation Laws. The most powerful such corporation is Toltech Enterprises, which controls 75% of the known galaxy's resources. Bounty hunters and mercenaries work for both corporations and planetary governments, lending their services to the highest bidder irrespective of the mission. The best of these guns-for-hire are known as "Shadowguns".

When the game begins, John Slade, a renowned Shadowgun, is tasked by Toltech with finding Dr. Edgar Simon, a bio-engineer formerly employed by Toltech who has stolen a series of genetic samples. Simon has relocated to the planet Eve, and Toltech wants him returned dead or alive, but preferably alive. Slade heads to Eve in his ship, the Rook, anticipating the mission will be easy. However, as he enters Eve's atmosphere, his landing craft is hit with a previously undetected missile. He crash lands near an abandoned mining fracility, and from the Rook, his android co-pilot, S.A.R.A. (Sentient Android Registered Assistant) indicates that she cannot scan the surface of the planet, as her scans are being blocked; Simon knows Slade has arrived.

Immediately, Slade is attacked by some gun wielding mutants. After killing them, he uploads a tissue sample to S.A.R.A., who tells him that the facility is emitting a cloaking signal to prevent scanning, so she is unable to locate the whereabouts of Simon. Slade heads to disrupt the cloaking tower, using an excavator to destroy it. S.A.R.A. then informs Slade that the mutants are the genetically modified natives of the planet; Simon is conducting experimentation on the indigenous population.

Slade proceeds through the facility, fighting off mutants as he goes. He eventually finds Simon on an operating table with his brain removed. Slade is then attacked by a giant mecha into which has been placed Simon's brain. Slade flees and is contacted by Toltech, who tell him they want Simon's brain at all costs. As Slade pursues Simon, he discovers that Simon had actually been on Eve all along, it was his base of operations whilst he was still employed by Toltech; his research into genetic engineering was funded by Toltech, who wanted him to build a mutant army for them. However, Simon came to see himself as a god, killed his entire research team, and taking the army for himself. Eventually Slade destroys Simon, and the player is given the choice as to whether or not to retrieve his brain for Toltech. If the player chooses to retrieve the brain, the game ends with Toltech thanking Slade, and telling him his fee has been paid. If the player destroys the brain, the game ends with Slade telling S.A.R.A. that Toltech will be out to get them, but despite that, they are going on vacation.

The Leftover expansion missions pick up immediately where the main game ends, with Slade having just destroyed Simon. He asks S.A.R.A. to send him a dropship so he can return to the Rook, but first he must activate a transmitter. Before he is able to do so however, the Rook is attacked by some Toltech vessels, and a team of Toltech soldiers are dispatched to the planet. Slade is cut off from S.A.R.A. and has to fight his way through the Toltech soldiers. He discovers that the team has been sent to bring the mutant army under Toltech's control and that he himself is considered expendable. Slade decides to destroy the entire facility by overloading the main power core. He does so, and is subsequently rescued by a damaged S.A.R.A. in a dropship.

== Expansion and spin-off ==
On December 21, 2011, an expansion pack, titled Shadowgun: The Leftover, was released for the iOS version of Shadowgun. The expansion added four new levels set after the events of the original game, added a roll ability, a re-tuned difficulty level and graphical enhancements to the main game, such as camera shake and bullet trails. The expansion was released for Android on January 28, 2012.

In 2012, a spin-off game, Shadowgun: Deadzone, was released for the App Store and Google Play. The game is not a sequel to Shadowgun, but is a multiplayer game using the same engine, graphics and milieu.

On August 15, 2016, Madfinger Games announced a sequel, Shadowgun Legends.

== Reception ==
Reception

Aggregate score
Aggregator	Score
Metacritic	72/100

Review scores
Publication	Score
Edge	4/10
IGN	7/10
148Apps	4/5
AppSpy	4/5
MacLife	4.5/5
Pocket Gamer	8/10
Slide to Play	3/4
TouchArcade	3/5
TouchGen	4/5

Awards
Publication	Award
Mobile Application of the Year	Mobile Application of the Year (2012)
Czech Game of the Year	Mobile Game of the Year (2011)
TegraZone Player's Choice	Best Graphics (2011)

Shadowgun has received generally positive reviews. The game holds an aggregate score of 72 out of 100 on Metacritic based on 24 reviews. The game was featured in the App Store Rewind (2011) and also included in the App Store Essentials Hall of Fame.

Edge were unimpressed, scoring the game 4 out of 10. They praised the graphics but were highly critical of the level design and gameplay; "it does a fairly decent job of convincing you that thirdperson cover shooters can work well controlled through the touchscreen of an iOS device. Sadly, Madfinger's evident technical flair is almost entirely lacking when it comes to level design, weapon design, and – well, pretty much any kind of design, really [...] Shadowgun settles into a rut within minutes and fails to emerge from it for the length of its generous campaign. This is a smart template for future fun, but the details need work. When it comes to getting this kind of game onto iOS then, Madfinger has, in more ways than one, done all the boring bits." TouchArcade's Thorin Klosowski was also disappointed, scoring the game 3 out of 5 and writing "It's a lovely looking game, one of the best on iOS, but it's so riddled with holes, crashes, bugs and repetition, it's easier to walk away frustrated than in awe of it [...] the bulk of the game follows the same formula on repeat: walk into area, trigger event, enemies rush out, hide behind cover, shoot."

IGN's Justin Davis scored it 7 out of 10. He too was impressed with the graphics, calling it "one of the best-looking mobile games ever created." However, like Edge, he was critical of the core gameplay; "Shadowgun is competent in every way, but isn't exceptional in any way, besides its visuals. The game is fun from start to finish, but isn't likely to "wow" people with its gameplay in the same way it will with its graphics."

Carter Dobson of 148Apps scored the game 4 out of 5, writing "The game in its entirety is very repetitive and basic; combat tends to consist of the same process of "get behind cover and shoot enemies when the reticle turns red." However, he concluded that "Fans of shooters looking for a game with high production values and console-quality gameplay scaled down for mobile will love this." AppSpy's Andrew Nesvadba also scored it 4 out of 5, criticizing the plot but writing that "Shadowgun makes for a fun evening of solid shooter gameplay. It's not perfect, but that only means we can look forward to bigger and better things in the future." TouchGen's Nigel Wood also scored it 4 out of 5, writing "Despite its shortcomings, with the short solo campaign and lack of multiplayer, I can wholeheartedly recommend you go download Shadowgun [...] great level design, balls-to-the-wall cover based action, and solid set pieces; all wrapped up in an enjoyable b-movie-esque tale and, of course, stunning presentation. As a graphical showcase alone – of what can be achieved on iOS with the Unity engine – it's worth it."

MacLife's Seamus Bellamy was more impressed, scoring the game 4.5 out of 5, and concluding "Looking and playing like a AAA title should, Shadowgun is well worth your attention and your money." Pocket Gamer's Will Wilson scored it 8 out of 10, giving it a "Silver Award" and lauding the graphics, controls, boss fights and sound, specifically the voice acting. He called the game "the best third-person action game available on mobiles, with stunning graphics and tight controls." Slide To Play's Jason D'Aprile scored it 3 out of 4 saying that, "Shadowgun definitely has some of the highest production qualities we've seen on a mobile device." They praised the use of the Unity engine, comparing it to the mobile use of the Unreal Engine 3 in games like Infinity Blade; "the character models look great, the levels are sharp and detailed, and while the game is largely a corridor-based shooter, the gorgeous backgrounds provide a grand sense of scale. The frame rate is impressively solid, even with multiple enemies on the screen." Ultimately however, he found the game too derivative of Gears of War 3; "It's unfortunate that Madfinger didn't put much effort into creating something more than a simple homage to a console game. Shadowgun is merely content to look pretty and blow things up. This isn't a bad thing, but it still feels like a missed opportunity."
