= Battle of Eniwetok =

1944 battle of World War II's Pacific theater in the Marshall Islands

- Part of the Gilbert and Marshall Islands campaign of the Pacific Theater (World War II)
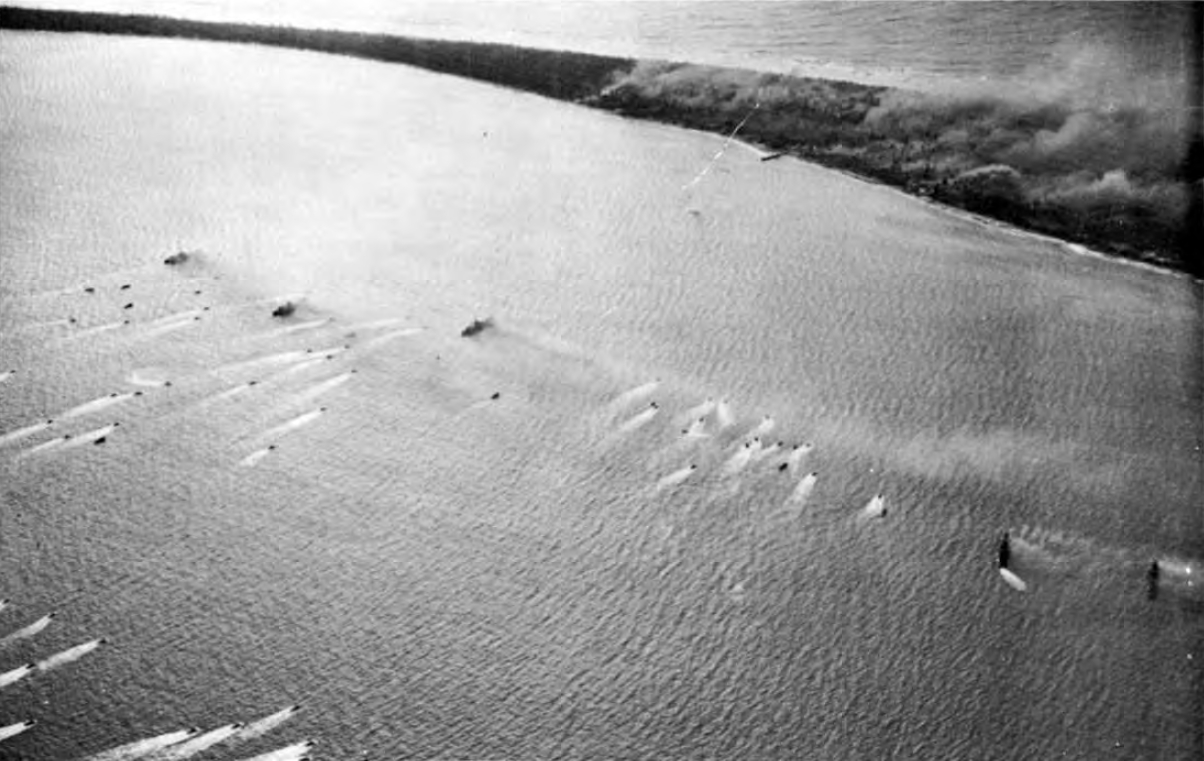
- Landing craft heading for Eniwetok Island on 19 February 1944.
Date	17 – 23 February 1944
Location	Enewetak Atoll, Marshall Islands 11.465°N 162.189°E
Result	American victory

Belligerents
United States	Japan

Commanders and leaders
Harry W. Hill; John T. Walker; Thomas E. Watson	Yoshimi Nishida †

Strength
2 regiments: 22nd Marine Regiment; 106th Infantry Regiment	3,500; 9 light tanks 3 anti-tank guns 3 naval guns 4 mountain guns

Casualties and losses
313 killed 77 missing 879 wounded	3,380 killed 144 captured 1 naval gun destroyed
- Location within Marshall Islands Battle of Eniwetok (Pacific Ocean)

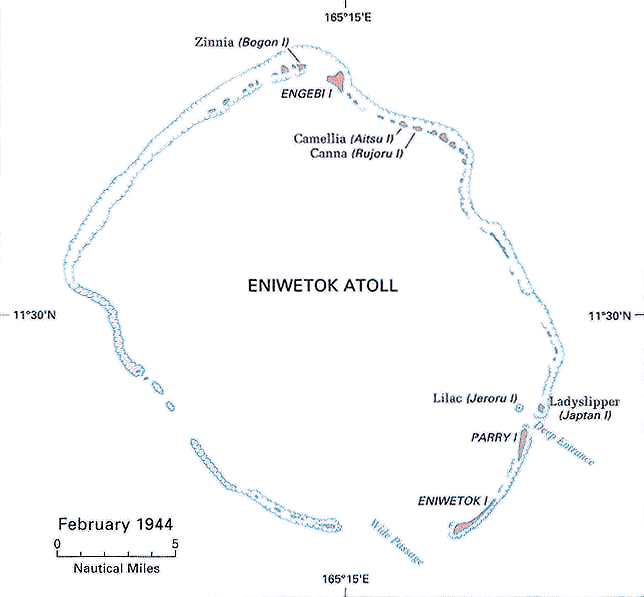
Map of Eniwetok Atoll

The Battle of Eniwetok was a battle of the Pacific campaign of World War II, fought from 17 to 23 February 1944 on Enewetak Atoll in the Marshall Islands. The invasion of Eniwetok followed the American success in the Battle of Kwajalein to the southeast. Capture of Eniwetok would provide an airfield and harbor to support attacks on the Mariana Islands to the northwest. The operation was officially known as "Operation Catchpole" and was a three-phase operation involving the invasion of the three main islands in the Enewetak Atoll.

== Background ==
Eniwetok is a large coral atoll of 40 islands with a land area total less than 5.85 square kilometres (2.26 sq mi). It has a mean elevation above sea level of 3 metres (9.8 ft) and surrounds a deep central lagoon, 80 kilometres (50 mi) in circumference.

Following World War I, the atoll became part of the Japanese South Seas Mandate. Japan had no military presence until November 1942, when an airfield was constructed on Engebi Island. This was used for refueling planes between Truk and islands to the east, with no aviation personnel stationed there; and the island had only token defenses.

When the Gilbert Islands fell to the United States in late 1943, the Imperial Japanese Army assigned defense of Eniwetok to the 1st Amphibious Brigade, recently formed from reservists of the 3rd Independent Garrison in Manchukuo, 3,940 men under the command of Major General Yoshimi Nishida, first arriving on 4 January 1944.

On 17-18 February 1944, Vice Admiral Raymond A. Spruance executed Operation Hailstone, an American carrier strike against the Japanese base at Truk in the Caroline Islands destroying 39 warships and more than 200 planes. Among the lost was the 1st Amphibious Brigade's supply ship Aikoku Maru.

Altogether, only 2,586 of General Nishida's men arrived on Eniwetok. These were supplemented by aviation personnel, civilian employees, and labourers. Most were stationed on Parry Island (now Medren), where Nishida established his headquarters.

== Battle of Engebi ==
Engebi Island is at the north tip of Enewetak Atoll. The island is triangular in shape, with a palm grove on its eastern side and an airfield across its north half. The island was lightly defended by a garrison of 60 men with a battery of two 12 cm guns and two twin mounted 13 mm machine guns. The island also had 500 non-combatants. On 4 January 1944, the 1st Amphibious Brigade arrived on Eniwetok. Engebi received 692 men from the brigade and 54 naval personnel, commanded by Colonel Toshio Yano. These reinforcements had two flame throwers, thirteen grenade launchers, twelve light machine guns, four heavy machine guns, two 37 mm anti-tank guns, eleven 81 mm mortars, one 20 mm automatic gun, two 20 mm cannons, two Type 94 75 mm mountain guns, and three Type 95 light tanks. They were deployed on the lagoon side, where Colonel Yano expected the Americans to land. They constructed a strong point half way along the shore and smaller strong points at the island's three corners.

On 16 February United States Navy aircraft from Task Group 58.4 attacked Engebi. This took the airfield out of operation. It also destroyed up to 14 aircraft and one of the coastal defence guns, at the northeastern corner of the island. The main invasion fleet arrived off Eniwetok early on 17 February.

Naval bombardment of Eniwetok began on 17 February, and at 13:18 US forces landed on Canna and Camelia islets, near Engebi. No resistance was encountered. A blocking force was placed on the island chain to the south of Engebi to stop the defenders from escaping.

At 06:55 on 18 February the battleship USS Colorado and the cruiser USS Louisville began to bombard the northern and eastern ends of the island. The battleships USS Tennessee and USS Pennsylvania opened fire on the beach defences at dawn, and at 07:20 the destroyer USS Phelps (DD-360) began direct fire. At 08:00 a naval air attack began, and at 08:11 the naval bombardment resumed. Artillery from the islets captured on 17 February also added to the bombardment.

The main landings were carried out by two battalions from the 22nd Marine Regiment, commanded by Colonel John T. Walker, which landed on Engebi at 08:43 on 18 February, supported by medium tanks and two 105mm self propelled guns. There was very little resistance at the beach, except from the southern tip of the island. The airfield was quickly captured, and within an hour the tanks had reached the northern shore. The 3rd Battalion landed at 09:55 and began to mop up the few remaining defenders. The island was declared secure by 14:50, though mopping-up continued through the next day. US losses included 85 killed and missing plus 166 wounded. The Japanese lost 1,276 killed and 16 captured.

On 18–19 February the Americans cleared the smaller islands on the atoll's east side. There they found evidence that Parry and Eniwetok Islands were more heavily defended than expected, so the battle plan was adjusted. Originally, the 106th Infantry Regiment was to invade Eniwetok and Parry simultaneously. Instead, they cleared Eniwetok first, then Parry.

== Battle of Eniwetok ==
Eniwetok Island is a long, narrow island, widest at the southwestern end, and very narrow on the northeastern end. A road existed on the lagoon shore on the southwestern half of the island, where the settlement was located. This topography meant that defense in depth was impossible. On the island the Japanese had 779 Army troops, 24 civilians, and five naval personnel, all under the command of Lieutenant Colonel Hashida Masahiro. The defenders had two flame throwers, 13 grenade launchers, 12 light machine guns, two heavy machine guns, one 50mm mortar, eleven 81mm mortars, one 20mm automatic gun, three 20mm cannons, and three Type 95 light tanks. Most defenses were foxholes and trenches. Work had also begun on some concrete pillboxes, which were not completed.

At 07:10 on 18 February two cruisers and two destroyers opened fire on Japanese positions from the lagoon side of Eniwetok. At 07:40 a third destroyer opened fire to the east of the landing beaches, and at 08:10 a fourth destroyer also commenced bombardment. At 08:10 naval gunfire halted for 15 minutes to allow carrier aircraft to attack. The first troops landed at 09:17, but the initial landings immediately ran into problems. The short naval bombardment left many Japanese positions intact, and the American LVTs could not scale an 8 feet (2.4 m) sand dune just inland. These early problems were quickly overcome, and the Americans reached the island's ocean shore by 11:45. A Japanese counter-attack, carried out by 300–400 men, hit the western part of the American line, which was supported by mortar fire. The attack was over by 12:45 and had failed to break the Americans.

At 14:25 the 3rd Battalion, 106th Infantry Regiment landed. They pushed towards the southwestern end of the island. By nightfall, they had reached the west corner of the island. The Army commander, Colonel Ayers, ordered that the attack continue through the night to eliminate the Japanese pocket in the northwest corner. A Japanese counterattack at 09:10 on 19 February reached the Marine battalion command post but was repulsed. The 3rd Battalion continued to press the attack south, along the east coast. The Japanese spider hole defensive positions were intact, with heavy undergrowth providing good defensive cover. Progress was slow, as spider holes had to be eliminated one-by-one.

The fighting in the west came to an end on the morning of 20 February; however, the island was not declared secured until 21 February. 37 Americans were killed or missing and 94 wounded. The Japanese had 800 dead and 23 prisoners.

== Battle of Parry Island ==
Parry Island is smaller than Eniwetok and was more heavily defended. When the invasion began the Japanese had 1,115 troops and 250 other personnel on Parry, equipped with 36 heavy grenade launchers, 36 light machine guns, six heavy machine guns, ten 81mm mortars, three 20mm automatic guns, two mountain guns, one 20mm cannon and three Type 95 light tanks. The island is tear-drop shaped with the larger end to the north, facing the lagoon. The Japanese defences consisted of a series of eight strong points along the beach, protected by trenches and a network of foxholes.

Based on experience at Eniwetok, the American naval bombardment of Parry Island was more thorough. On 22 February the battleships USS Tennessee and USS Pennsylvania and the heavy cruisers USS Indianapolis and USS Louisville and the destroyer USS Hailey delivered more than 900 tons of explosive onto the island, with the 104th Field Artillery on Eniwetok and the 2nd Separate Pack Howitzer Battalions on Japtan Island to the north providing additional fire support. The invasion force consisted of the 1st and 2nd Battalions of the 22nd Marines, who had just finished mopping up at Engebi. The 1st Battalion advance on the right, and the 2nd Battalion advanced on the east. The landing occurred at 09:00 with a combined force of Marines and tanks advancing rapidly past Japanese positions once machine-gun fire had been suppressed, followed by demolition and flame-thrower squads clearing out spider holes and Japanese defenders who had been bypassed, followed by three four-man squads mopping up any survivors.

At 10:00 remaining Japanese artillery was suppressed by naval bombardment, and by 11:55 the 1st Battalion reached the ocean shore, with the 2nd Battalion taking the northern tip of the island by 13:00. The 1st Battalion then turned to the southern tip of the island, reinforced by the 3rd Battalion along the lagoon shore. At 19:30 the regimental commander radioed "I present you with the island of Parry", though operations continued through the next day. U.S. casualties included 73 killed and missing plus 261 wounded. The vast majority of Japanese soldiers were killed, including General Nishida, although 105 survivors were captured.

== Aftermath ==
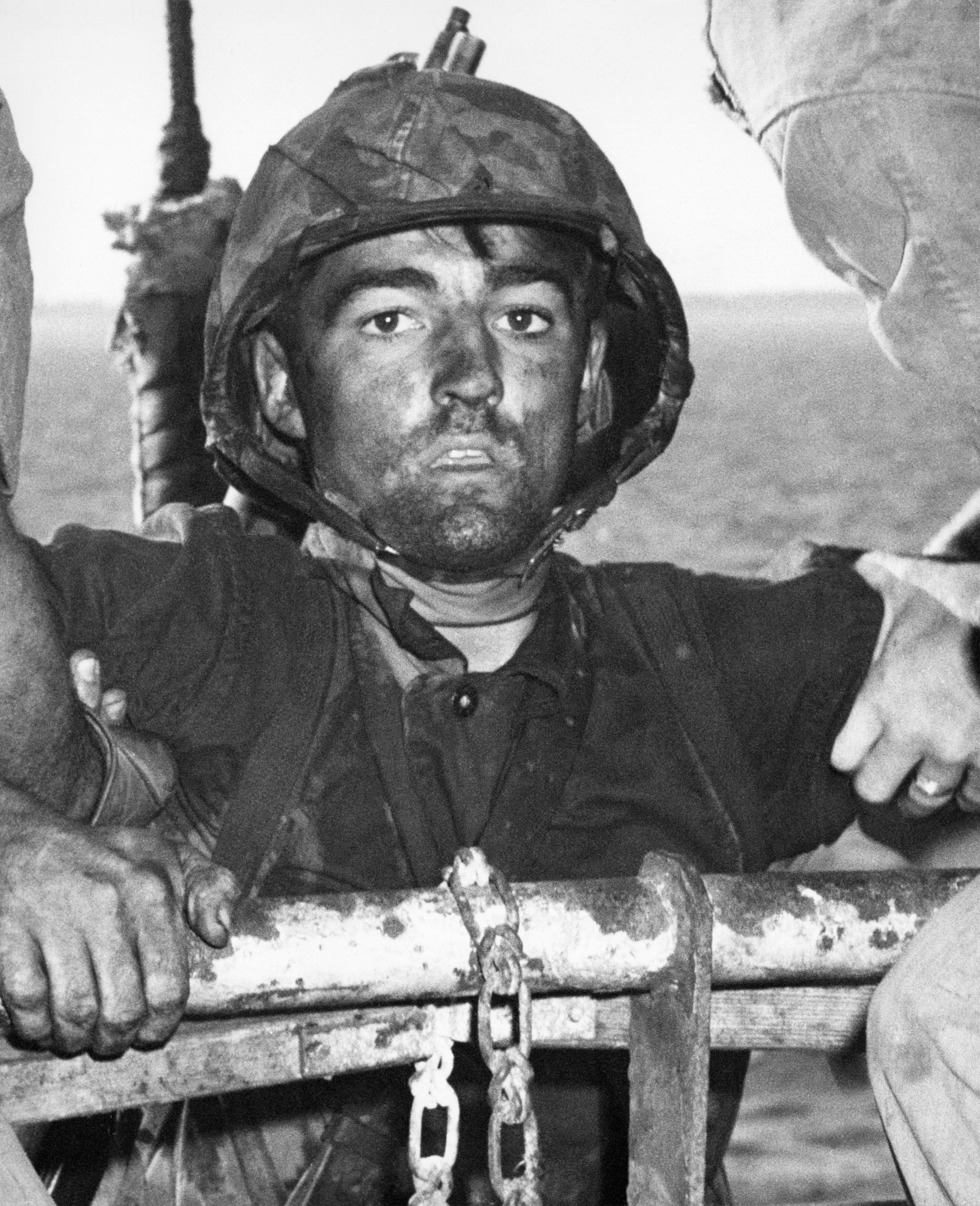
An exhausted US Marine exhibiting the thousand-yard stare after two days of constant fighting on Eniwetok.

Eniwetok Atoll became Naval Base Eniwetok, providing a forward base for the United States Navy for its later operations.

== Notes and references ==
- Morison, Samuel Eliot (1961). Aleutians, Gilberts and Marshalls, June 1942–April 1944, History of United States Naval Operations in World War II. Boston: Little, Brown and Company. ASIN B0007FBB8I.
- Rottman, Gordon; Howard Gerrard (2004). The Marshall Islands 1944: Operation Flintlock, the capture of Kwajalein and Eniwetok. Oxford: Osprey Publishing. ISBN 1841768510.
- Rottman, Gordon; Dr Duncan Anderson (2004). US Marine Corps Pacific Theater of Operations 1943–44. Oxford: Osprey Publishing. ISBN 1841766518.
