= Samurai: Way of the Warrior =

2009 video game

- Developer: Madfinger Games
- Publisher: Madfinger Games
- Engine: Unity
- Platform: iOS
- Release: 31 August 2009
- Genre: Hack and slash
- Mode: Single-player

Samurai: Way of the Warrior is a 2009 action “Hack and Slash” video game for iOS. It was developed by Madfinger Games.

== Development ==
The game was the first title by Madfinger Games and was released in 2009. Developers were at the time employees of 2K Czech and worked on it at their free time before they officially founded a company in May 2010.

When the company was founded, the developers decided to release an updated version of the game as Samurai: Way of the Warrior HD.

== Plot ==
The story is told through comic book cutscenes. It is about a wandering samurai Daisuke Shimada as he is dealing with villainous Lord Hattoro and his henchmen Kumo and Orochi. Before he can face them he has to defeat their army.

== Gameplay ==
The game features a story mode and a Dojo mode. The story mode consists of 7 chapters where the player fights multiple enemies of a different type. To fight them he can use 12 different combos. Dojo mode is on the other hand a survival mode where the player has to survive as long as he can.

== Reception ==
Most reviews were positive, critics praising Samurai: Way of the Warrior for its visuals, controls and gameplay. By contrast, some reviewers bemoaned the game for being repetitive and too short. Samurai: Way of the Warrior won several awards, including an Apple Best Game of 2009, a Best App Ever Award 2009 and an Honorable Mention for Best Game Graphics from 148Apps. AppAdvice ranked it number 16 in its Top 100 iPhone Games of All Time.

== Sequel ==
The sequel Samurai II: Vengeance was released in 2010. The game included a new story of Daisuke and new elements such as interactive environment.
