= Amphibious Rapid Deployment Brigade =

- 水陸機動団; Suirikukidōdan
- Official ARDB insignia.
- Active: March 27, 2018 – present; April 7, 2018 - Present (First units activated)
- Country: Japan
- Branch: Japan Ground Self-Defense Force
- Type: Marines
- Role: Amphibious warfare
- Size: Brigade: 2,100 men (from establishment); 2,400 men (2020); Eventually would have 3,000 soldiers
- Part of: Ground Component Command

Commanders
- Current commander: Major General Shinichi Aoki

The Amphibious Rapid Deployment Brigade (水陸機動団, Suirikukidōdan) is the only marine unit of the Japan Ground Self-Defense Force (JGSDF) responsible for conducting amphibious warfare, coastal defence, and rapid response operations to security threats in island areas in Japanese territorial waters if invaded.

The ARDB is based at Camp Ainoura in Sasebo, Nagasaki Prefecture.

== History ==
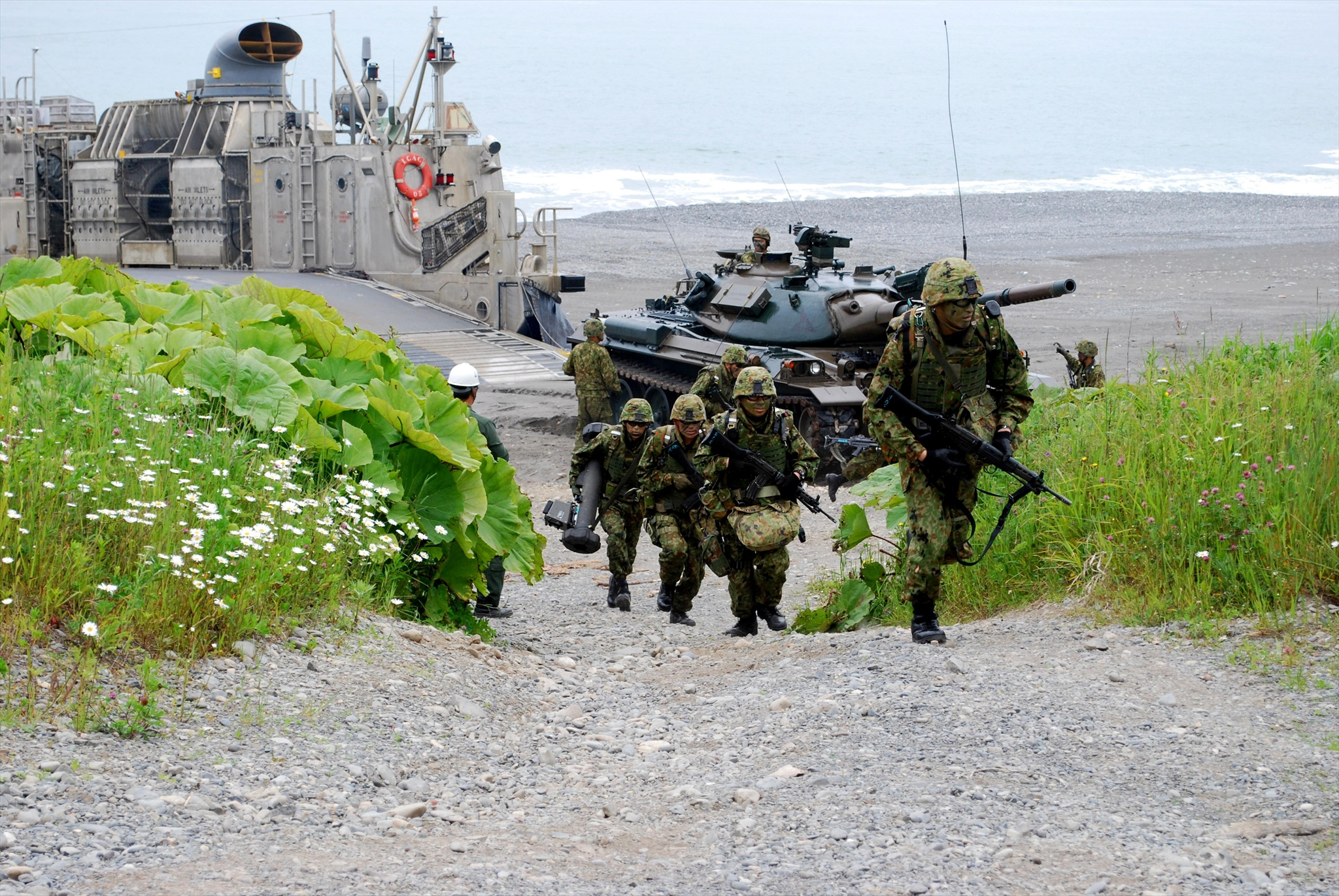
Members of the 6th Division (Japan) conduct a landing training by LCAC in 2012.

In light of tensions over the Senkaku Islands and the decision for putting the Chinese Coast Guard under military control, Japan started the process of creating an elite marine unit. This brigade was designed to conduct amphibious operations and to recover any Japanese islands taken by an adversary.

In 2006, Japan devised a plan to respond to this threat as outlined in the Defense Programs and Budget of Japan. Thus Japan prepared an amphibious force with the necessary know-how, acquired amphibious and other vehicles for such warfare. Prior to this, training was conducted with the U.S. Marine Corps such as "Iron Fist" and the integrated exercise "Dawn Blitz" in which the JSDF participated.

In the Rim of the Pacific Exercise of 2014, the Japan Ground Self-Defense Force participated for the first time with amphibious warfare training between the U.S. Marine Corps and the GSDF for multilateral exercises. In Japan, joint exercises are also conducted by inviting the U.S. Marine Corps at JGSDF Camp Soumagahara (Gunma Prefecture) and training with the dispatch of GSDF members to the U.S. Marine Corps in Okinawa Prefecture.

In 2016, 300 WAIR soldiers were sent to Camp Pendleton for marine training. They were also trained to prepare for the ARDB's establishment.

On March 27, 2018, groundwork for the creation of the ARDB was completed.

On April 7, 2018, Japan activated its first marine unit since World War II. The marines of the Japanese Ground Self-Defense Force (JGSDF)'s Amphibious Rapid Deployment Brigade, gathered at a ceremony activating the brigade at JGSDF's Camp Ainoura in Sasebo. The Brigade is trained to counter invaders from occupying Japanese islands along the edge of the East China Sea that Tokyo considers vulnerable to attack.

150 ARDB soldiers were deployed for the first time in an overseas training exercise with American and Filipino marines in Operation Kamandag in October 2018. This was the first time that Japanese armored vehicles were on foreign soil since WW2. The marine unit also dispatched 300 soldiers to participate in Exercise Talisman Saber in July 2019, training in amphibious landings at Queensland, Australia along with Australian soldiers and American and British marines. The ARDB suffered its first casualty when a 38-year old JGSDF soldier, Suguru Maehara, with the rank of Sergeant 1st Class, was killed in a vehicular accident during joint exercises with US and Filipino troops on 7 October 2018. The vehicle he was riding in collided with another vehicle in Subic Bay.

On March 10, 2021, 55 recruits passed the training course for the ARDB, including two women. The two women, Sergeants First Class Azusa Unno and Misaki Hirata, had participated in the unit's 16th training session.

In March 2024, the 3rd Regiment was formally activated at Camp Takematsu in Nagasaki. Minister of Defense Minoru Kihara presented the regimental flag to commanding officer, Col. Takada. These "regiments" are battalion size units.

On May 13, 2025, it's reported that the ARDB will train with the Republic of Korea Marine Corps.

=== Future ===
Inter-operability will be a key component of ARDB operations with the JGSDF planning to establish a significant aviation capability at Saga Airport, sixty kilometers from the ARDB's base at Camp Ainoura. The aviation element is to be based in Kyushu starting in 2025 and is to consist of 17 V-22 aircraft and about 50 Black Hawk and Apache Longbow helicopters.

== Organization ==
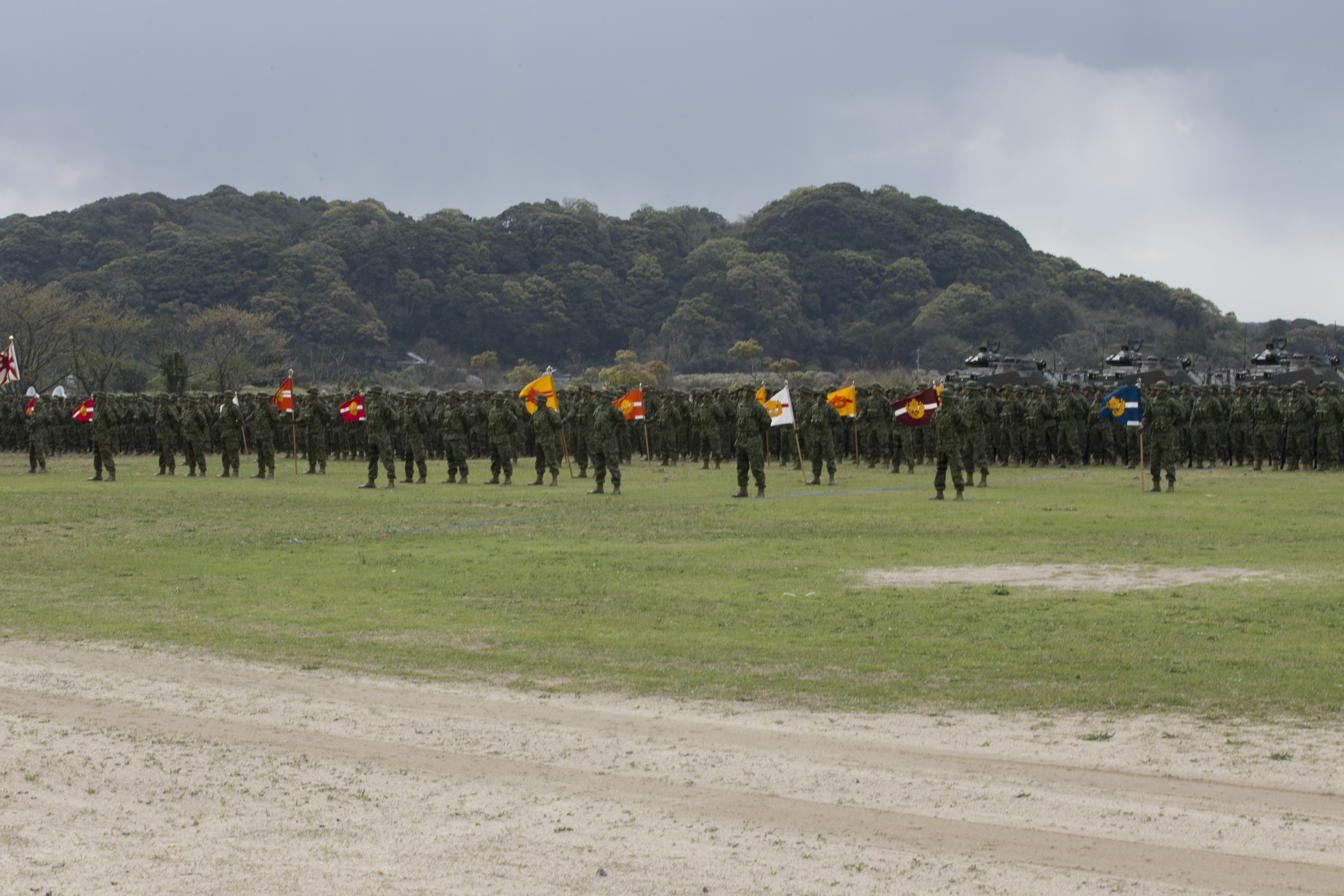
The Amphibious Rapid Deployment Brigade activation ceremony

The ARDB is composed of the following units:

- Amphibious Rapid Deployment Brigade, in Sasebo
  - 1st Amphibious Rapid Deployment Regiment, in Sasebo
  - 2nd Amphibious Rapid Deployment Regiment, in Sasebo
  - 3rd Amphibious Rapid Deployment Regiment, in Ōmura
  - Combat Landing Battalion, in Sasebo, with Assault Amphibious Vehicles
    - 2 combat landing Company
  - Artillery Battalion, in Yufu, with F1 120 mm mortars
    - 2 firing Company
    - fire observe Company
  - Reconnaissance Company, in Sasebo
  - Engineer Company, in Sasebo
  - Signals Company, in Sasebo
  - Logistic Support Battalion, in Sasebo
    - 2 maintenance Company
    - supply Company,
    - medical Company,
  - Amphibious Rapid Deployment Training Unit, in Sasebo

== Key executives ==
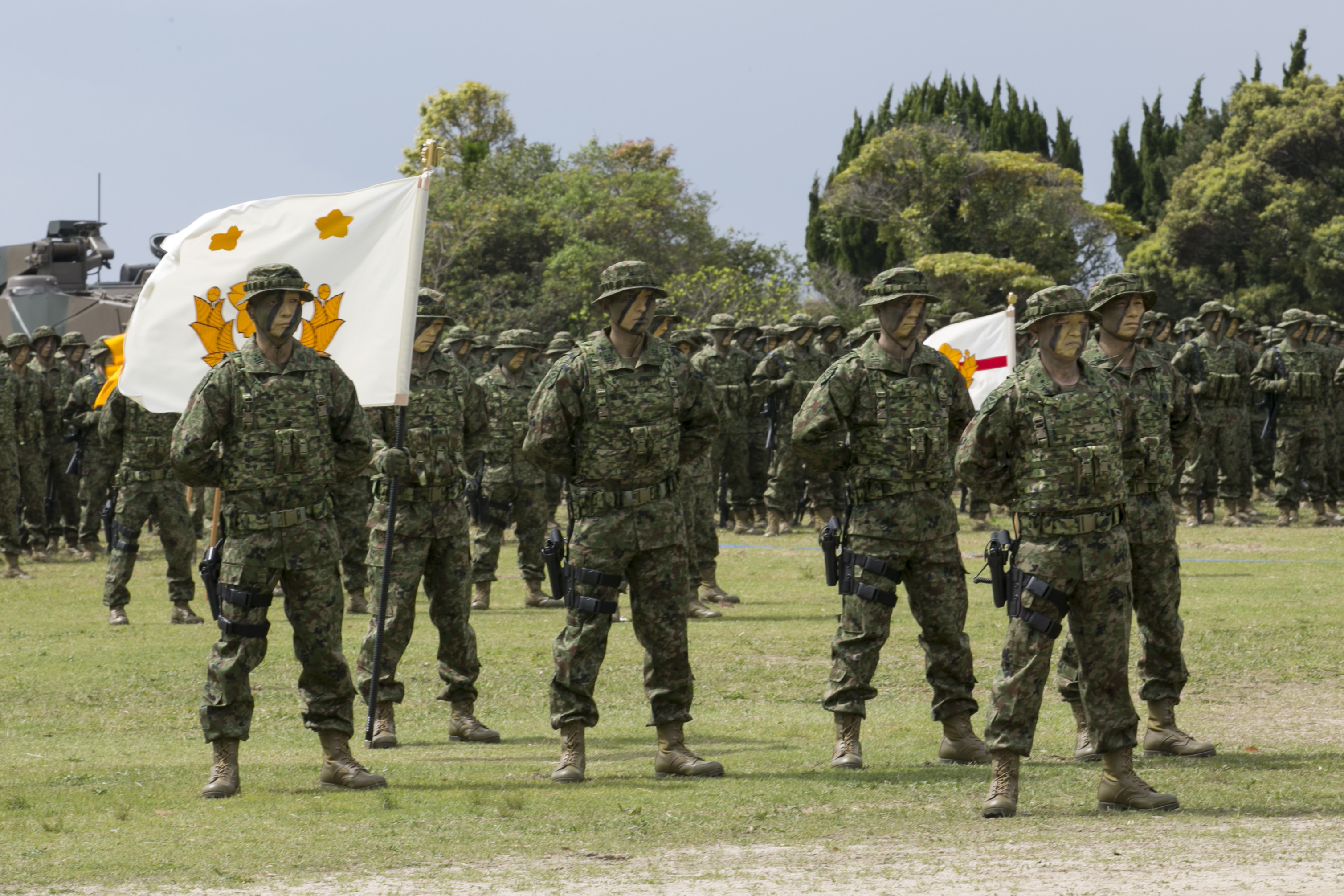
Major General Shinichi Aoki, Commander of the Amphibious Rapid Deployment Brigade

Official name	Rank	Full name	Assigned date	Former post
Commander of Amphibious Rapid Deployment Brigade and Commander of Aiura Garrison	Major general	Takanori Hirata (平田隆則)	December 20, 2019	Deputy Chief of Staff of the Western Army (Japan)
Deputy Commander	Colonel	Yūji Hirata (平田雄嗣)	March 23, 2019	2nd Soda Education Team Leader
Senior staff	Colonel	Seiji Uesono (上薗誠司)	March 27, 2018	General manager, Regional Liaison Coordination Division, General Affairs Department

== Equipment ==
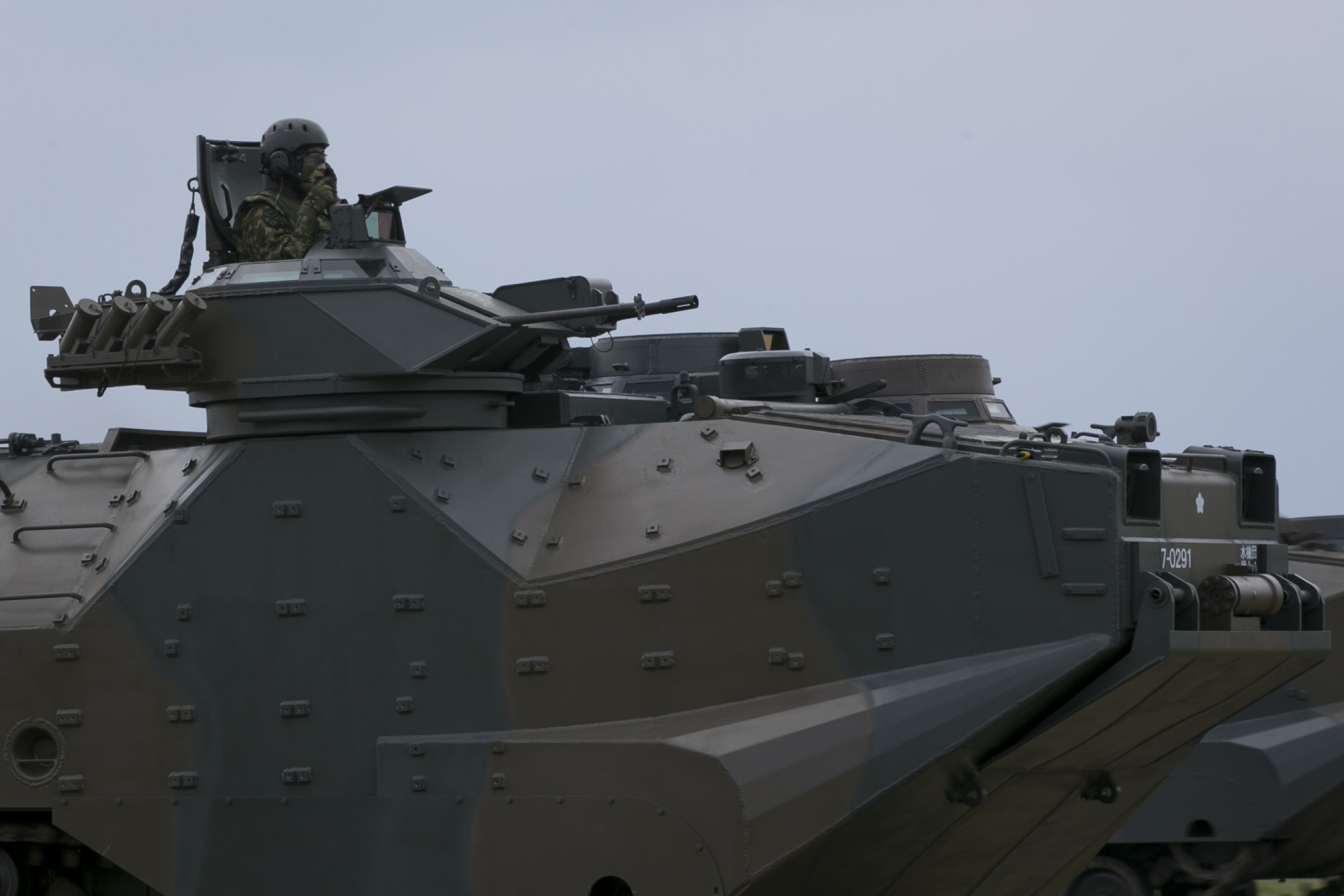
AAV7 equipment for the ARDB

=== Infantry weapons ===
ARDB forces are equipped with light infantry weapons, including:

- Carl Gustaf 8.4cm recoilless rifle
- Middle range Multi-Purpose missile
- Hirtenberger M6C-210 Light mortar
- L16 81mm mortar Medium mortar
- M120 RT Heavy mortar
- Minimi 5.56mm Light Machine guns
- MAG 7.62mm Machine guns
- Howa Type 20 Assault rifles
- Howa Type 89 Assault rifles
- M24 SWS Sniper Rifles
- Minebea PM-9 Machine pistol

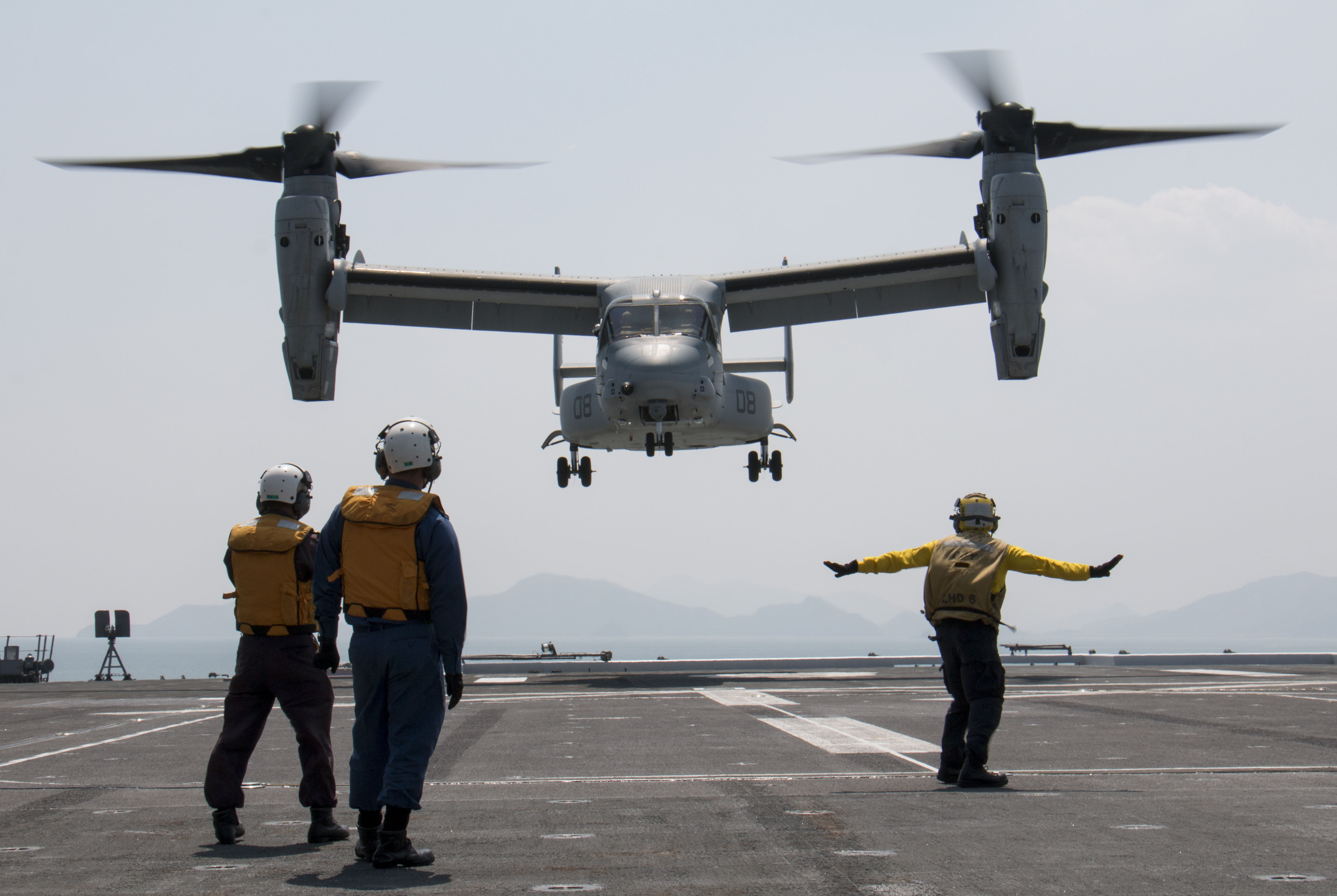
U.S. Marine Corps MV-22B Osprey aircraft work with Japan to deliver earthquake relief supplies.

=== Vehicles ===
The ARDB is also equipped with US and Japanese-made military vehicles and aircraft such as:

- Assault Amphibious Vehicle AAV7A1 RAM/RS
- Bell Boeing V-22 Osprey MV-22B Tiltrotor aircraft
- Combat Rubber Raiding Craft
- Komatsu LAV
- Mitsubishi Type 73 light truck
- Toyota Type 73 medium truck

== See also ==
- Amphibious Brigades (Imperial Japanese Army) – Historical army units
- Imperial Japanese Marines – Historical navy units
