= Minebea PM-9 =

Japanese machine pistol

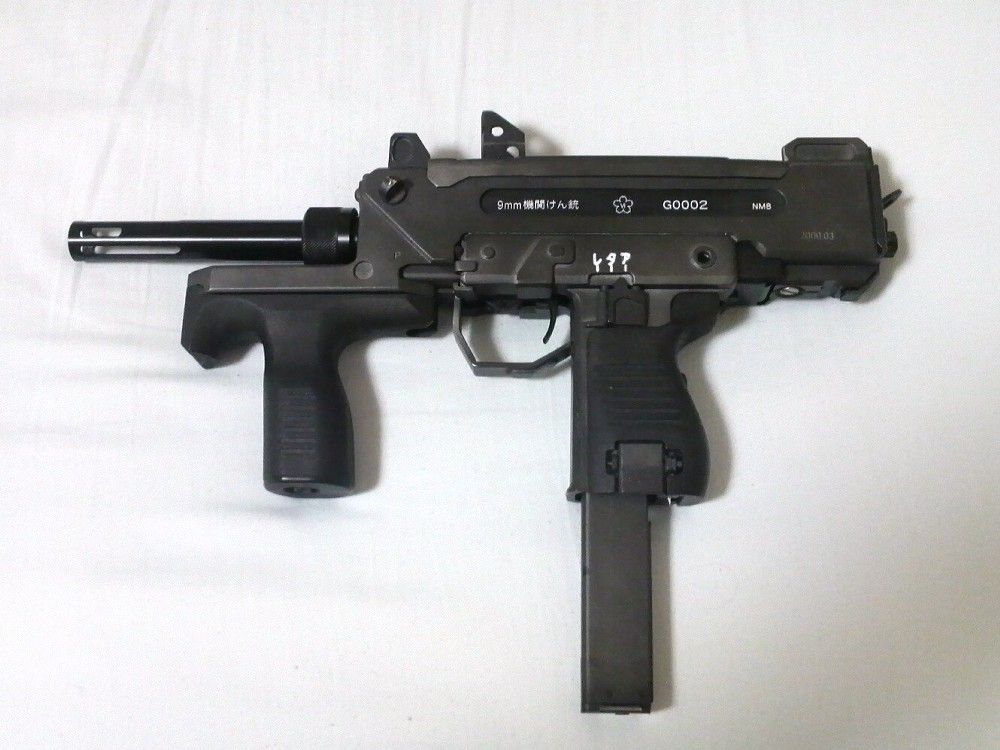
- 1:1 airsoft replica of a Minebea PM-9
- Type: Submachine gun Machine pistol
- Place of origin: Japan

Service history
- In service: 1999–present
- Used by: Japan

Production history
- Manufacturer: Minebea Co.
- Unit cost: 440,000 yen (2021)
- Produced: 1990–present

Specifications
- Mass: 2.8 kg / 6.2 lbs
- Length: 399 mm / 15.7"
- Barrel length: 120 mm / 4.7"
- Cartridge: 9×19mm Parabellum
- Action: Blowback
- Rate of fire: 1100 RPM
- Effective firing range: 100 m
- Feed system: 25-round magazine
- Sights: Iron sights

The Minebea PM-9 Submachine Gun, known officially in the Japan Self-Defense Forces (JSDF) as the 9mm Machine Pistol (9mm機関拳銃, Kyumiri Kikan Kenjū) or as the M9, is a Japanese-made submachine gun and machine pistol. Analogous to the Israeli IMI Mini-Uzi, it has the same telescoping bolt as the Mini-Uzi, but differs in its appearance, operation and handling.

Although the PM-9 nomenclature is widely used among non-Japanese firearms communities, there have been no public records or confirmations of its official use. As such, it is mostly referred to in its full name or its shorthands, and less so in the supposed alphanumeric nomenclature in Japanese texts.

== History ==
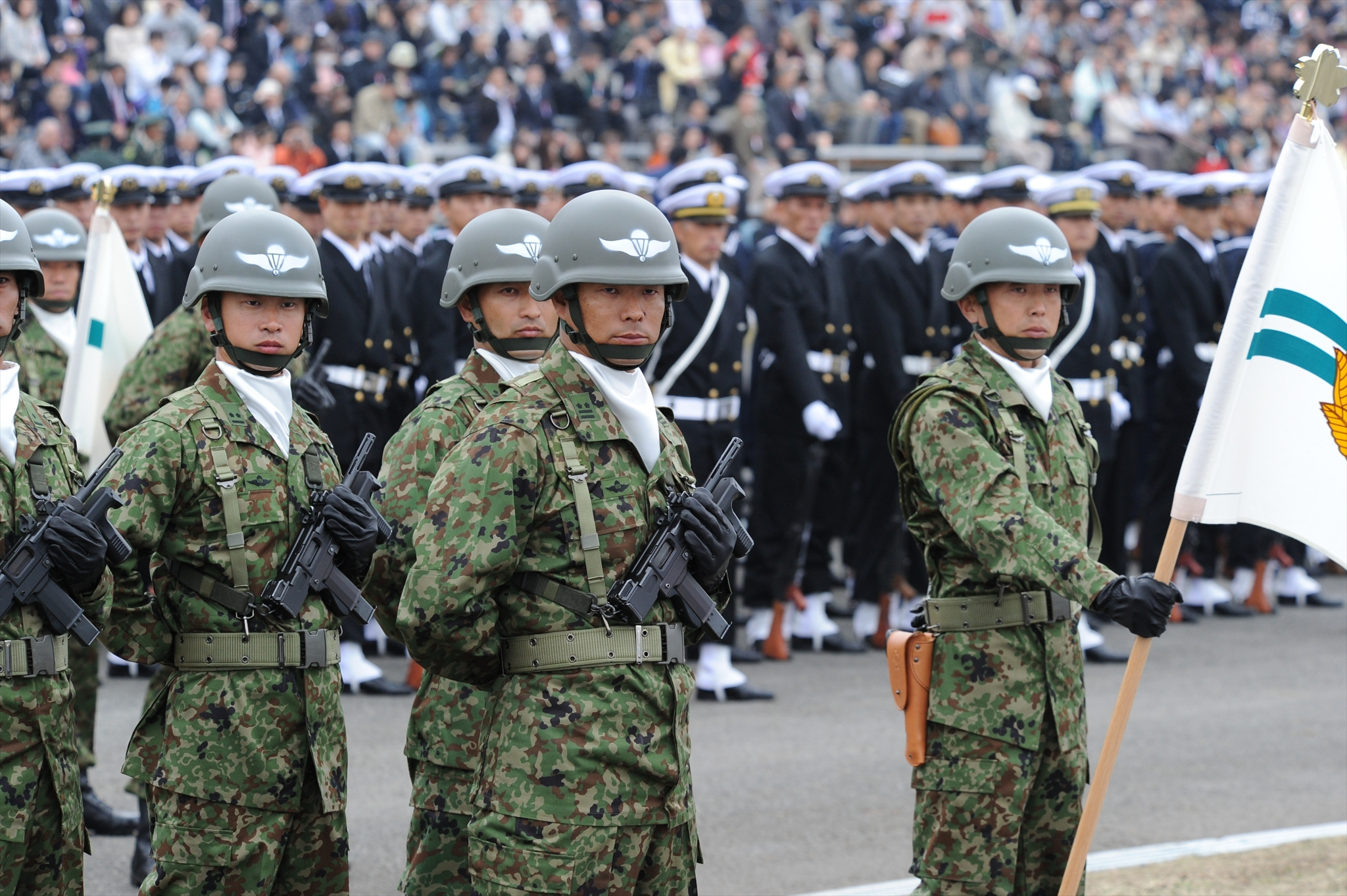
1st Airborne Brigade paratroopers in a parade with PM-9s.

The PM-9 is produced by the Nippon Miniature Bearing Company, otherwise known as Minebea. The design is analogous to the Mini-Uzi submachine gun. It was adopted in 1999 for non-frontline forces such as vehicle drivers, artillery personnel, some of its special forces units, and some commissioned officers who were given priority for better equipment. It replaced M3 submachine guns provided by the US to the JGSDF. However, there is not a lot of production due to high procurement costs.

Though it has been the official submachine gun for more than a decade, as of 2009 JSDF officials are looking at a possible replacement, as it is planned to phase it out in the near future. One possible replacement is the Heckler & Koch MP5. JMSDF and JASDF personnel continue to procure the PM-9 while procurement has stopped in the JGSDF with plans to replace the PM-9.

=== Official use ===
The JSDF uses the PM-9 as its official submachine gun. The 1st Airborne Brigade, the 12th Brigade and (formerly) the Western Army Infantry Regiment are the only units in the Japan Ground Self-Defense Force (JGSDF) known to be armed with the PM-9 as the brigade's main submachine gun. The PM-9 is reported to be in use in the JGSDF's Special Forces Group. The Japan Air Self-Defense Force (JASDF) uses it when conducting base security and by the Japan Maritime Self-Defense Forces (JMSDF) as a personal weapon issued for sailors.

== Designs ==
The PM-9 differs in appearance from its Israeli counterpart in a few ways. A foregrip is mounted underneath the barrel of the PM-9 to aid fully automatic firing with a flash suppressor in place. PM-9s were originally made with wooden pistol and foregrips; plastic is used on those currently in JSDF service. Machined steel is used in its construction.

The PM-9 can be fired in semi or full auto mode with safe mode under 「ア」「タ」「レ」.

The submachine gun has no stock and the user must use it through grip alone.
