= Shadowgun Legends =

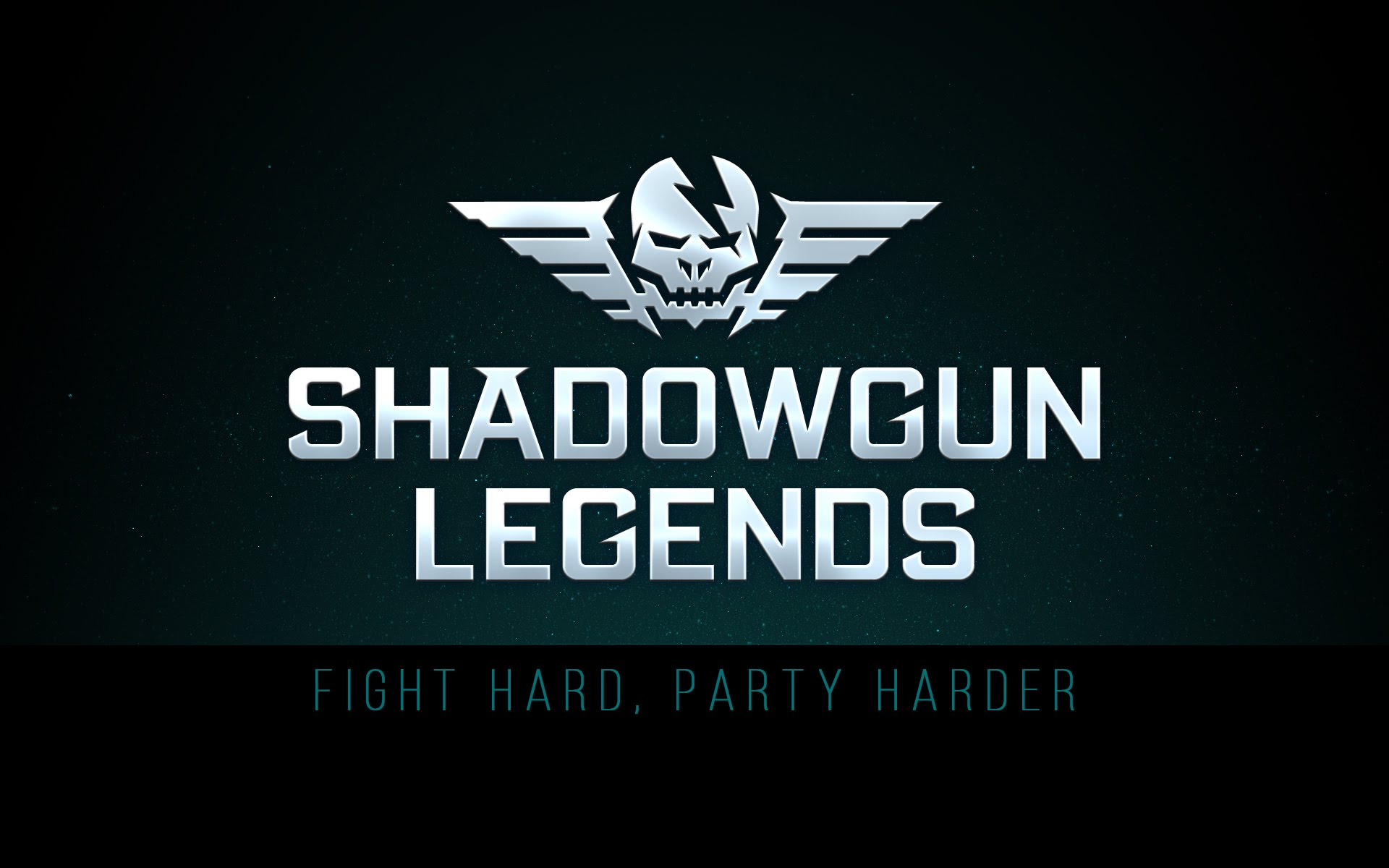
- Developer: Madfinger Games
- Publisher: Madfinger Games
- Series: Shadowgun
- Engine: Unity
- Platforms: Android; iOS; TvOS
- Release: March 22, 2018
- Genres: First-person shooter, massively multiplayer online role-playing
- Modes: Single-player, multiplayer

Shadowgun Legends is a free mobile first-person shooter video game developed and published by Madfinger Games for Android and iOS devices. It is the third primary installment of the Shadowgun series, and a sequel to the original Shadowgun and Shadowgun Deadzone, both multiple award-winning games from 2011 and 2012, respectively. It was released on March 22, 2018. It appeared on the Google Play Store on March 21, 2018. A release for the Nintendo Switch was announced in June 2018 but never came to fruition.

Screenshot from Shadowgun Legends as part of Nvidia Shield Promotion Tour

The game consists of 11 single-player campaign missions and over 40 side missions and many multiplayer game modes such as Duel, Capture The Flag, Dungeons and Arenas.

== Gameplay ==
Shadowgun Legends is a first-person shooter game with role-playing and MMO elements. At the beginning of the game, the player creates a Shadowgun, a male or a female soldier from the eponymous group. The player is then moved to the main base of all Shadowguns, the Hub. There the player can access various missions given by NPCs, in-game bar, casino, shops and multiplayer missions.

Players progress by completing given missions. Missions can be either part of a Story Campaign, or one of the Side Quests. Each completed mission will reward players with experience points and allows further progress.

=== Player versus environment (PvE) ===
The game offers multiple types of PvE gameplays that can be played either in single-player, or with a group of players.

==== Story Mission ====
Missions advancing the plot of the game, describing the progress of the fight against the Torment. Can be played in Solo or Duo modes.

==== Side Quests ====
Missions given by one of the additional NPCs, the player is sent on an adventure helping the specific NPC who assigned the mission to the player. Can be played in Solo or Duo modes.

==== Operations ====
Short missions where the player helps on day-to-day operations to other parts of the Shadowgun Universe. Can be played in cooperation with other players

==== Dungeons ====
Longer missions designed for a group of three players. The mission includes puzzles and a fight against the final boss.

==== Arenas ====
Wave-based challenges for a group of three players. Players have to survive multiple waves of increasingly difficult enemies.

=== Player versus player (PvP) ===
==== Duel ====
PvP match of two players against each other. The first player to score 5 points wins. The time limit is 5 minutes, if none of the players score 5 points before the time runs out, the player with the most points wins.

==== Ascendancy ====
PvP match of two teams of four. Players have to collect trophies dropped from the killed enemy player. The first team to score 20 points wins. The time limit is 5 minutes, if none of the teams score 20 points before the time runs out, the team with the most points wins.

==== Elimination ====
PvP match of two teams of four. After a player is killed, the team is deducted one respawn. The first team that uses up all its respawns loses.

==== Capture The Flag ====
PvP match of two teams of four. First team to bring the enemy flag to their base 3 times wins.

== Story ==
The game is set in the world of Shadowgun, a consumer-driven society. The main character is part of the Shadowguns, a group of elite mercenaries. The way of life is threatened by the Torment, an alien race from unknown parts of the Galaxy. They first attack one of the Earth's colonies and spark a full-scale galactic conflict.

=== Characters ===
The game features number of NPCs that are tied to the lore of Shadowgun Legends and previous games from the franchise.

==== Slade ====
The legendary Shadowgun and current leader. Provides story missions and rewards. Main character from the first game in the series, Shadowgun.

==== Pedro ====
A vendor helping with decoding of holograms looted from missions and received as rewards. He is also selling cosmetic items including helmets, paint cans, sticker, emotes, and tombstones. Pedro also gives players Side Quests. He also exchanges rewards with items collected by Shadowguns during limited time events.

==== Willow ====
A vendor supplying players with weapons and cosmetic items. Willow also gives players Side Quests.

==== Big Red ====
A vendor supplying players with armors and cosmetic items. Big Red also gives players Side Quests.

==== Hakim ====
A vendor offering players sponsored contracts. Player will choose a brand to represent and will receive regular paycheck of in-game currency. Hakim also gives players Fame Hunter missions, that will reward players certain amount of Fame.

==== Nitro ====
Multiplayer vendor. Players can access PvP and PvE missions from this point. Players can buy items like with gold or PvP tokens (tokens are earned by playing Team PvP).

==== S.A.R.A. ====
An android character in charge of the in-game bar. Can also give players Side Quests.

== Reception ==
Reception

Aggregate score
Aggregator	Score
Metacritic	86/100

Review scores
Publication	Score
Gamezebo	4.5/5
Pocket Gamer	4.5/5
TouchArcade	4/5

Shadowgun Legends has received generally positive reviews from critics. It won the Most Beautiful Game during the 2019 Google Play Awards.
