= Dead Trigger =

2012 video game

- App Store icon
- Developer: DECA Games
- Publisher: DECA Games
- Engine: Unity
- Platforms: iOS, Android
- Release: June 28, 2012
- Mode: Single-player

Dead Trigger is a 2012 zombie-themed video game developed and published by Madfinger Games And later acquired by DECA Games. It was released in June 2012 for iOS and Android mobile devices. The game is single-player only.

A sequel, Dead Trigger 2, was released in 2013.

== Gameplay ==
The game starts at the map screen, where the player can select currently available missions or access in-game features including a shop, casino, and arena. There are always several generic missions available, as well as story missions. Additionally, the player can play a bonus mission each day for a small gold bonus.

Dead Trigger includes two forms of currency: cash and gold. Cash is earned in missions, by dismembering zombies, collecting cash briefcases, and completing objectives. Gold can be earned in the daily bonus mission, and the player is awarded a small amount of gold each time they level up. However, gold takes a very long time to be earned this way and is included primarily as a microtransaction and advertising element - the player can purchase gold with real money or earn gold by downloading other video games.

Cash and gold can be used to purchase weapons, equipment, and character upgrades. Weapons are mostly based on real-life firearms such as the Colt M1911A1 and AK-47. Dead Trigger offers pistols, rifles, shotguns, machine guns, and melee weapons. Items include medkits and sentry turrets. Character upgrades include additional item slots and health.

Dead Trigger offers a basic progression system where the player gains experience points and can level up, but leveling up only unlocks new weapons and items in the shop.

All missions fall into several basic types, such as defending doors or killing a certain number of zombies. There are a limited number of locations that are reused frequently in both story and random missions. Another game mode is the arena, which is a wave-based survival mode.

== Storyline ==
The game is set in a world where a plague of an unknown source has killed billions of people and many others turned into dangerous creatures. The rest of humanity is desperately trying to survive in this world. Kyle, the protagonist of the game, meets a group of survivors led by Julian Lassagne that created a colony known as New Hope. He joins them and helps them survive. The group also finds a government-run underground bunker and slowly searches it floor by floor. They eventually find out that the plague was planned by a wealthy group. The storyline ends as Julian and Kyle decides to go after them.

== Release ==
The game started on iOS as a paid app and was later added as a paid app to Android. The developers eventually switched to a free-to-play model supported by in-app purchases due to "unbelievably high" piracy.

Dead Trigger has had over 60 million downloads, on all platforms, as of 2024. The franchise totals over 160 million downloads including Dead Trigger 2.

== Reception ==
Reception

Aggregate score
| Aggregator | Score |
|---|---|
| Metacritic | 70/100 |

Review score
| Publication | Score |
|---|---|
| TouchArcade | 2/5 |

According to review aggregating website Metacritic, the game received an average review score of 70 out of 100 based on 15 reviews. CNET gave Dead Trigger an 8.7 out of 10, praising many gameplay elements but criticizing how long it takes to collect gold without using in-app purchase. Modojo gave Dead Trigger a 4.5 out of 5, praising the game's graphics and gameplay but noting the lack of variety as the game goes on.

== Sequel ==
During NVIDIA's CES 2013 press conference Dead Trigger 2 was revealed, used as a tech demo to demonstrate the power of the upcoming Tegra 4. The press conference showed a short gameplay video featuring a massive enemy. Dead Trigger 2 was released on October 23, 2013. Dead Trigger 2 has had over 100 million downloads and continues to be popular. A recent trailer saw over 23 million views in under 3 weeks.

== Film adaptation ==
Writer-director Mike Cuff secured the film rights to the game in 2015 and began filming a live-action adaptation starring Dolph Lundgren and Isaiah Washington in Mexico in May 2016. Two days into filming Cuff left the production and Scott Windhauser, who had rewritten the screenplay with Dolph Lundgren, finished the film. Madfinger Games withdrew their support for the film, as the approved script was altered so radically. Cuff and Madfinger had no further participation in the film. It was released in the United States theatrically/on VOD by Saban Films/Lionsgate on May 3, 2019, and on DVD/Blu-ray by Lionsgate Home Entertainment in July 2019.
