= Samurai II: Vengeance =

2010 video game

- Developer(s): Madfinger Games
- Publisher(s): Madfinger Games
- Engine: Unity
- Platform(s): iOS, Android, BlackBerry OS, Microsoft Windows, macOS
- Release: 21 October 2010
- Genre(s): Hack and slash
- Mode(s): Single-player

Samurai II: Vengeance is an action Hack and Slash video game for iOS, Android, BlackBerry OS, Microsoft Windows and macOS. It was developed by Madfinger Games. It is a sequel to Samurai: Way of the Warrior.

== Gameplay ==
Samurai II: Vengeance is a cel-shaded hack and slash video game that depicts the story of a great samurai in a mythological Feudal Japanese setting. The story begins when the samurai named Daisuke kills the leader of the enemies using his special combo. Now the player must control the samurai using a joystick or keyboard and use his different combos and moves to stab the enemies. Breaking barrels and killing enemies grants the user with Karma. Karma is needed for buying new moves and combos. Advancing to new levels makes the enemies more strong and powerful.

== Plot ==
Daisuke continues on his journey to find information about Orochi. He reaches a seaside village, kills the leader (one of Orochi's) in combat and slaughters his men. The villagers, grateful trust Daisuke, but a wounded soldier sends a distress signal and reinforcements arrive, in which Daisuke kills them all again. The village elder sends Daisuke for an errand that involves destroying an outpost in the mountains. He returns to the village and the elder tells him how Orochi bonded his soul with the demon Mikaboshi and gained more power. Daisuke bids farewell, goes to the Isle of the Dead and learns of Orochi's Giant Air Fortress. Daisuke kills everyone in the Isle and infiltrates the Air Fortress. After single-handedly massacring Orochi's men, he comes to fight Daisuke, a long and seemingly impossible battle goes and Daisuke gains the upper hand, to which he leaves Orochi dead.

== Reception ==
Reception

Aggregate score
Aggregator	Score
Metacritic	83/100

Samurai II: Vengeance has received generally positive reviews for critics and it holds a score of 83 out of 100 on Metacritic.

Pocket Gamer's Tracy Erickson praised the game's difficulty stating "Samurai II has a learning curve that initially seems steep, yet by exerting a high level of challenge early in the game, it better equips for tougher scenarios later down the line."

The game received 2 Czech game of the year awards. One for best video game for mobile devices and one for artistic achievement in game creation.
