= Monzo (video game) =

2014 video game

- App icon
- Developer: Madfinger Games
- Publisher: Madfinger Games
- Engine: Unity
- Platforms: iOS, Android
- Release: WW: 5 November 2014
- Genre: Simulation
- Mode: Single-player

Monzo is a 2014 simulation video game developed and published by the Czech studio Madfinger Games. The game is a simulator for building plastic models.

== Gameplay ==
The player can build multiple types of models, including cars, airplanes, weapons, bikes, etc. The player can also choose the level of complexity of the model. The models can be reviewed when finished.

== Reception ==
The game has received mostly mixed reviews from critics.

148Apps praised the Idea for the App but criticised the Business Model.

Pocket Gamer praised the detailed Models but criticised that Monzo anaesthetises the whole experience of the physical Creation Process. The business model was also criticised with the notion that buying new Models isn't worth the price.

The game has received Czech Game of 2014 Award in Category The Best Original Game.
