= Akiyama Monzō =

Japanese rear admiral

- 秋山 門造
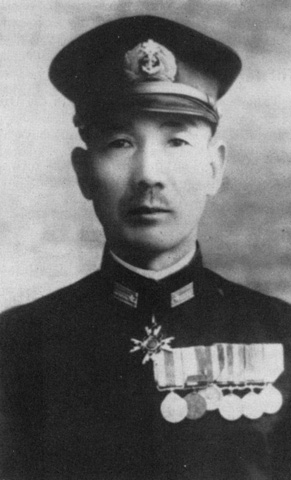
- Born: December 30, 1891; Kan'onji, Kagawa, Japan
- Died: January 25, 1944 (aged 52); Kwajalein, Marshall Islands
- Military career
- Allegiance: Empire of Japan
- Branch: Imperial Japanese Navy
- Service years: 1914–1944
- Rank: Vice Admiral (posthumous)
- Commands: Mamiya, 6th Naval Base Force
- Conflicts: World War II; Pacific War; Battle of Kwajalein †
- Awards: Order of the Rising Sun (posthumous)

Akiyama Monzō (秋山 門造, Akiyama Monzō; December 30, 1891 – January 25, 1944) was an admiral in the Imperial Japanese Navy who served in World War II. He was killed in action during the Battle of Kwajalein.

== Biography ==
Akiyama was born to a farm family in what is now part of the city of Kan'onji, Kagawa, Japan. The family was very poor, and could not afford any machinery, so as a youth, Akiyama spent his school holidays in the fields. In 1911 he was accepted into the 42nd class of the Imperial Japanese Naval Academy, and graduated in December 1914 ranked 66 out of 114 cadets. He was assigned as a second lieutenant on the battleship Kirishima. After graduating from gunnery school, he served as artillery officer on the cruiser Atago, on the staff of the Maizuru Naval District and as executive officer on the Haruna. In 1937, he was promoted to captain, and received his first command, that of the supply ship Mamiya. He returned to shore duty to command the guard division at Kure Naval District. He was promoted to rear admiral in May 1943 and made commander of the Kure Naval Arsenal.

However, later in 1943, he was assigned command of the 6th Naval Base Force and ordered to Kwajalein, in the Marshall Islands, replacing Vice Admiral Koso Abe. American forces had recently taken the Gilbert Islands, including Makin Island and Tarawa. Akiyama was in command of 5000 troops on the main islet of Kwajalein itself, with another 3000 troops on the islet of Roi-Namur on the opposite end of the same atoll. However, most of these troops were poorly trained reservists with no combat experience. Akiyama arrived in November 1943 and immediately ordered the construction of fortifications; however, the topography of the small islands made defence in depth impossible and there was no time or materials to construct anything substantial, such as the concrete bunkers which had served the Japanese defenders so well on Tarawa. Akiyama was also aware that there were no plans to send reinforcements, supplies or to plan for an evacuation, as the island had already been declared outside Japan's "absolute defence zone" by Imperial General Headquarters. On the first day of the American landings, he left his bunker to observe the front line, and was killed in action. He was posthumously promoted to vice admiral on March 29. In 1962, he posthumously received the Order of the Rising Sun, 2nd class.
