= Yoshimi Nishida =

Japanese general

- 西田 祥実
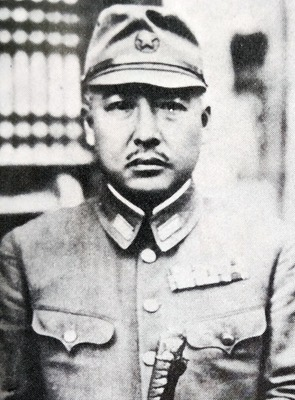
- Born: March 1, 1892; Kōchi Prefecture, Japan
- Died: February 21, 1944 (aged 51); Enewetak Atoll, South Seas Mandate
- Education: Imperial Japanese Army Academy
- Military career
- Allegiance: Empire of Japan
- Branch: Imperial Japanese Army
- Service years: 1913–1944
- Rank: Lieutenant General (posthumously)
- Units: IJA 41st Infantry Regiment; Central China Expeditionary Army
- Commands: IJA 25th Infantry Regiment; IJA 223rd Infantry Regiment; Kyoto Regiment; 3rd Independent Defense Regiment; 1st Amphibious Brigade
- Conflicts: Second Sino-Japanese War; World War II; Gilbert and Marshall Islands campaign; Battle of Eniwetok †
- Awards: Order of the Golden Kite, 4th class

Yoshimi Nishida (西田 祥実, Nishida Yoshimi; March 1, 1892 – February 21, 1944) was a general in the Imperial Japanese Army during World War II. He was killed in action during the Battle of Eniwetok.

== Biography ==
Yoshimi Nishida was born on 1 March 1892 in Kōchi Prefecture, Japan. He graduated from the 25th class Imperial Japanese Army Academy on 26 May 1913. He was promoted to the rank of first lieutenant on 25 December of the same year. He rose steadily through the ranks during the 1920s and 1930s, becoming captain and deputy commander of the IJA 41st Infantry Regiment in 1923, major in 1930, commander of the IJA 25th Infantry Regiment in 1932 and lieutenant-colonel in 1935.

Nishida was assigned to the Central China Expeditionary Army in February 1938 and was promoted to colonel in July of the same year. In March 1939 he was given command of the IJA 223rd Infantry Regiment. He was rotated back to Japan in 1940 and assigned to command the Kyoto Regiment.

Nishida was promoted to the rank of major-general on 1 August 1942 and assigned command of the 3rd Independent Defense Regiment, a reserve force. However, as the war situation deteriorated for Japan, he was recalled to combat duty and assigned the 1st Amphibious Brigade, which was the main defense force for the island of Eniwetok in the Marshall Islands. The 1st Amphibious Brigade had just been formed from the 3rd Independent Reserve Regiment, formerly based in Manchukou, and was poorly trained and unaccustomed to the tropics. The brigade had 3,940 men; however, with the loss of its supply ship Aikoku Maru during Operation Hailstone, only 2,586 men arrived on Eniwetok. These men were supplemented by aviation personnel, civilian employees, and labourers. Most were stationed on Parry Island, where Nishida established his HQ.

Nishida had erected several defensive positions to keep the Americans at bay, but the small size of the island made defenses in depth near impossible. With heavy naval artillery support, US Marines stormed Parry island on 22 February 1944, sustaining 131 casualties (37 KIA), against which Nishida and almost all of his 800 defenders were annihilated. Nishida was posthumously awarded the Order of the Golden Kite, 4th class and was promoted to lieutenant-general.
