= Dead Trigger 2 =

2013 zombie-themed survival horror game

- App Store icon
- Developer: DECA Games
- Publisher: DECA Games
- Engine: Unity
- Platforms: iOS, Windows Phone, Android, Facebook
- Release: iOS, Android: WW: October 23, 2013; Facebook: WW: February 20, 2014
- Genres: First-person shooter, survival horror, action role-playing
- Mode: Single-player

Dead Trigger 2 is a 2013 first person survival horror video game was developed and published by Madfinger Games, later acquired by DECA Games. It was released for Android and iOS devices on October 23, 2013, and for Facebook on February 20, 2014. As with the original Dead Trigger, Dead Trigger 2 is a single-player zombie-themed shooter. Nvidia showcased Dead Trigger 2 as the first tech demo for their upcoming Tegra 4 mobile system-on-a-chip; Slide to Play and Android Police compared the graphical quality to the Xbox 360 and PlayStation 3.

Dead Trigger 2 utilizes the Unity game engine. It was released as a free-to-play game; microtransactions are included in the final product, but the developers had tested the game without in-app purchases to make sure the core gameplay works without them.

== Gameplay ==
Dead Trigger 2 is a zombie-apocalypse-themed first-person shooter with survival horror and action role-playing elements, currently available on iOS, Android and recently on Windows Phone 8.1 mobile devices. Running on the Unity game engine, the game features a progression system, numerous environments, unlockable and upgradable weapons, and various story-based and quick-play mission types.

Dead Trigger 2 is a free-movement shooter; rather than the on-rails gameplay typical of mobile zombie shooters, the player controls the character's movement like a typical console or PC FPS. The game features two dramatically different control paradigms; with the default controls, the player merely aims at zombies - their weapons will attack automatically when a zombie is underneath the crosshair. The advanced control scheme functions like the first game - the player presses a button to fire the weapon, and an additional button lets the player aim down the weapon's sights for increased accuracy.

Gameplay typically revolves around completing objectives while killing zombies (occasionally killing zombies is the only objective). It also has an infinite wave of zombies in the arena of death. There are also different campaigns and tournaments. The player has a limited amount of health that is refreshed at the start of each mission. The player loses health when hit by zombies or by certain environmental hazards (i.e. radiation). The player can regain health by taking healing pills or getting a health power up from a special zombie.

Enemies come in two flavors, standard zombies and special zombies. Standard zombies often plod along at a slow pace and attack with their arms, but some may sprint or carry melee weapons for increased damage. Special zombies have distinct appearances and unique traits; they are deadlier and tougher to kill, but drop blueprints or large amounts of cash (and sometimes health) when killed.

In addition to carrying two primary weapons, the player also carries a melee weapon and up to three types of consumable items. Consumables include health pills, grenades, exploding chickens and others.

The storyline involves 5 campaigns, each set in a different continent:

- USA campaign
- Africa campaign
- China campaign
- Europe campaign
- South America campaign

== Reception ==
Reception

Aggregate score
| Aggregator | Score |
|---|---|
| Metacritic | 77/100 |

Review score
| Publication | Score |
|---|---|
| TouchArcade | 3/5 |

Dead Trigger 2 received positive reviews from critics. Review aggregator website Metacritic provides a score of 77 out of 100 based on 12 critics.
