= José Pascual Monzo =

Spanish politician (born 1952)

José Pascual Monzo (Valencia, Spain, 1952) is a Spanish politician who belongs to the People's Party (PP).

Married, with two children, Pascual qualified as a technical agricultural engineer. After serving as provincial president of the Association of Young Farmers, he entered politics in 1989 when he was elected to the Spanish Congress of Deputies representing Valencia region. He was re-elected in 1993 and 1996 but did not stand at the 2000 election. Since 2004 he has been a member of the Confederation of Cooperatives of the Valencian Community Following the PP election victory in the 2007 election to the Valencian regional parliament he was named Director General for the commercialisation of Agriculture, Fisheries and Food.
