= Amphibious Brigades (Imperial Japanese Army) =

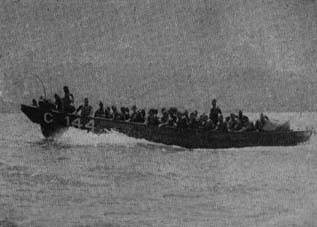
Ship-pioneers of the Imperial Japanese Army practicing landings with Daihatsu landing crafts, 1935

The four IJA Amphibious Brigades (海上機動旅団, Kaijō kidō ryōdan) were marines brigades of the Imperial Japanese Army during World War II. They were established in 1943. Although the Japanese invasion of Southeast Asia had been completed at the time of their founding, the Imperial General Headquarters (Daihon'ei) saw the need for flexible countermeasures to defend strategic islands in the Pacific Ocean from impending Allied invasion as the war situation deteriorated for the Japanese Empire.

The Amphibious Brigades should not be confused with the Special Naval Landing Forces (SNLF) of the Imperial Japanese Navy.

== Structure ==
The Amphibious Brigades were almost identical in structure to the IJA Amphibious Regiments, which had received additional training for amphibious warfare operations. They were not assigned any heavy artillery or transport vehicles, which made mobility on land difficult to impossible. The lack of transport was compensated by a larger than normal ammunition allocation. The brigades each had 35,643 rounds for their 81mm mortars and 7,445 rounds for their 75mm guns.

The individual amphibious brigades organized as follows:

Brigade staff (9 x amphibious vehicles)

- 3 Infantry battalions
  - 3 infantry companies
  - 1 artillery company (3 × 75 mm Mountain Guns and 2 × Infantry Guns )
  - 1 mortar company each (12 × 81 mm mortars)
  - 1 sapper company
  - 1 Anti-aircraft company (6 × guns)
  - 1 Armored company (9 × light tanks)
  - 1 Engineering company
  - 1 Communication company
  - 1 Medical and sanitation company

Landing and support vessels *

- 150 Daihatsu-class landing craft
- 10 SS-class landing ship
- 10 Type 4 MGB "Ka-Ro" (fire support)

However, the planned target strength with respect to the SS-class landing craft and MTBs was never achieved.

=== IJA 1st Amphibious Brigade ===
The 1st Amphibious Brigade (海上機動第1旅団) was created in 1943 and dissolved in 1945. Its tsūshōgō code was “Storm 3139” ( 駆3139, Kakeru 3139 ).

The 1st Amphibious Brigade was established on 16 November 1943 under the command of Lieutenant General Yoshimi Nishida out of the Manchukuo-based IJA 3rd Independent Garrison Unit. In mid-December 1943, the brigade embarked and arrived shortly afterwards at Truk, where it was placed under the IJN 4th Fleet. Imperial General Headquarters assigned it to Eniwetok to counter an expected Allied invasion: however, the brigade lost in the sinking of the Aikoku Maru at Truk on 17 February 1944 during Operation Hailstone. Another 800 men, including Lieutenant General Nishida were annihilated during the Battle of Eniwetok from 17 to 23 February 1944 by the United States Marine Corps. The remaining men and transports were sent to Palau and were incorporated into the IJA 53rd Independent Mixed Brigade in May 1944.

=== IJA 2nd Amphibious Brigade ===
The 2nd Amphibious Brigade (海上機動第2旅団) was created on 16 November 1943 and dissolved in 1945. Its tsūshōgō code was “Patrol3189” ( 巡 3189, Meguru 3189 ).

Although it was not planned to set up the 2nd Amphibious Brigade until 1944, the schedule was advanced to November 1943 due to the success of the Allied Operation Cartwheel. The 2nd Amphibious Brigade was established out of the Manchukuo-based IJA 5th Independent Garrison Unit with the staff from the IJA 29th Division. On 11 April 1944, the 2nd Amphibious Brigade was assigned to the Southern Expeditionary Army Group and was sent to the Philippines in May, but without their armored company. It was then transferred in June to the Vogelkop peninsula in western New Guinea, where he came under the command of the IJA 2nd Army. En route, its supply vessel was sunk by an American submarine, causing the loss of most of its ammunition and many rifles. During the Battle of Biak from 27 May – 17 August 1944 it was to be sent as reinforcement to the beleaguered Japanese garrison; however, it lacked the transport to reach the island. The 2nd Amphibious Brigade remained in Sorong for the duration of the war, where, weakened by malnutrition and disease, it surrendered in August 1945. Some 180 members of the brigade who survived the sinking of the supply ship were stranded in Zamboanga and were killed during the Battle of Mindanao.

=== IJA 3rd Amphibious Brigade ===
The 3rd Amphibious Brigade (海上機動第3旅団) was created in May 1944 and dissolved in 1945. Its tsūshōgō code was “Thunder 12630” ( 轟 12630, Todoroku 12630 ).

The formation of the 3rd Amphibious Brigade took place in May 1944 under the command of Colonel Ikeda Einosuke in Shumshu in the Kuril Islands from elements of the Chishima 1st Reserve Group. It was structured identically as the 1st and 2nd Amphibious Brigades. In 1945, it was placed under the command of the IJA 27th Army, and was part of the last-ditch defense of the Japanese archipelago against an anticipated American landing. It was transferred to Hokkaido, followed by Aomori. During the transfer, the transport carrying Colonel Ikeda was sunk by an American submarine, and he was replaced by Colonel Kurashi. On 1 May 1945 it was placed under the command of the IJA 40th Army and transferred to Kyushu, although a portion was sent back as part of a garrison force for Paramushir in the Kuriles. On 23 May 1945 the brigade was dissolved and its men and equipment reinforced the IJA 125th Independent Mixed Brigade, which ended the war in Kagoshima Prefecture.

=== IJA 4th Amphibious Brigade ===
The 4th Amphibious Brigade (海上機動第4旅団) was created in May 1944 and dissolved in 1945. Its tsūshōgō code was “Expelling 12630” ( 攘15582, Harau 15582 ).

The formation of the 4th Amphibious Brigade took place in May 1944 under the command of Major General Torihiko Mineki in Asahikawa, Hokkaido and was structured identically as the 1st and 2nd Amphibious Brigades. Its staff force and three infantry battalions came from the IJA 7th Infantry Division, however, its armored company was based in Morioka and its artillery company was located in Kokura, Kyushu. It was placed under the command of the IJA 27th Army, and was initially assigned to the defense of Iturup in the Kuril Islands, but it lacked proper transport and logistics support. In May 1945, it was withdrawn to Honshu and placed under the IJA 36th Army as part of the last-ditch defense of the Japanese archipelago against an anticipated American landing. It was based at Saitama Prefecture as part of defenses of Tokyo and was assigned to the IJA 1st Armored Division, but was used exclusively for road maintenance work and to grow crops. The brigade headquarters was at Sakura, Chiba at the end of the war.

== Literature ==
- Underwood, John: The Japanese Order of Battle in World War II. Vol. I. The Nafziger Collection, 1999, ISBN 978-1-58545-044-2 .
- Madej, Victor: Japanese Army Forces Order of Battle 1937-1945 . Volume I + II. Game Marketing Company, 1981.
- Ness, Leland: Rikugun. Guide to Japanese Ground Forces 1937-1945 . Helion & Company, 2014, ISBN 978-1-909982-00-0 .

== See also ==
- Amphibious Rapid Deployment Brigade
- Imperial Japanese Marines
