= 1st Amphibious Rapid Deployment Regiment =

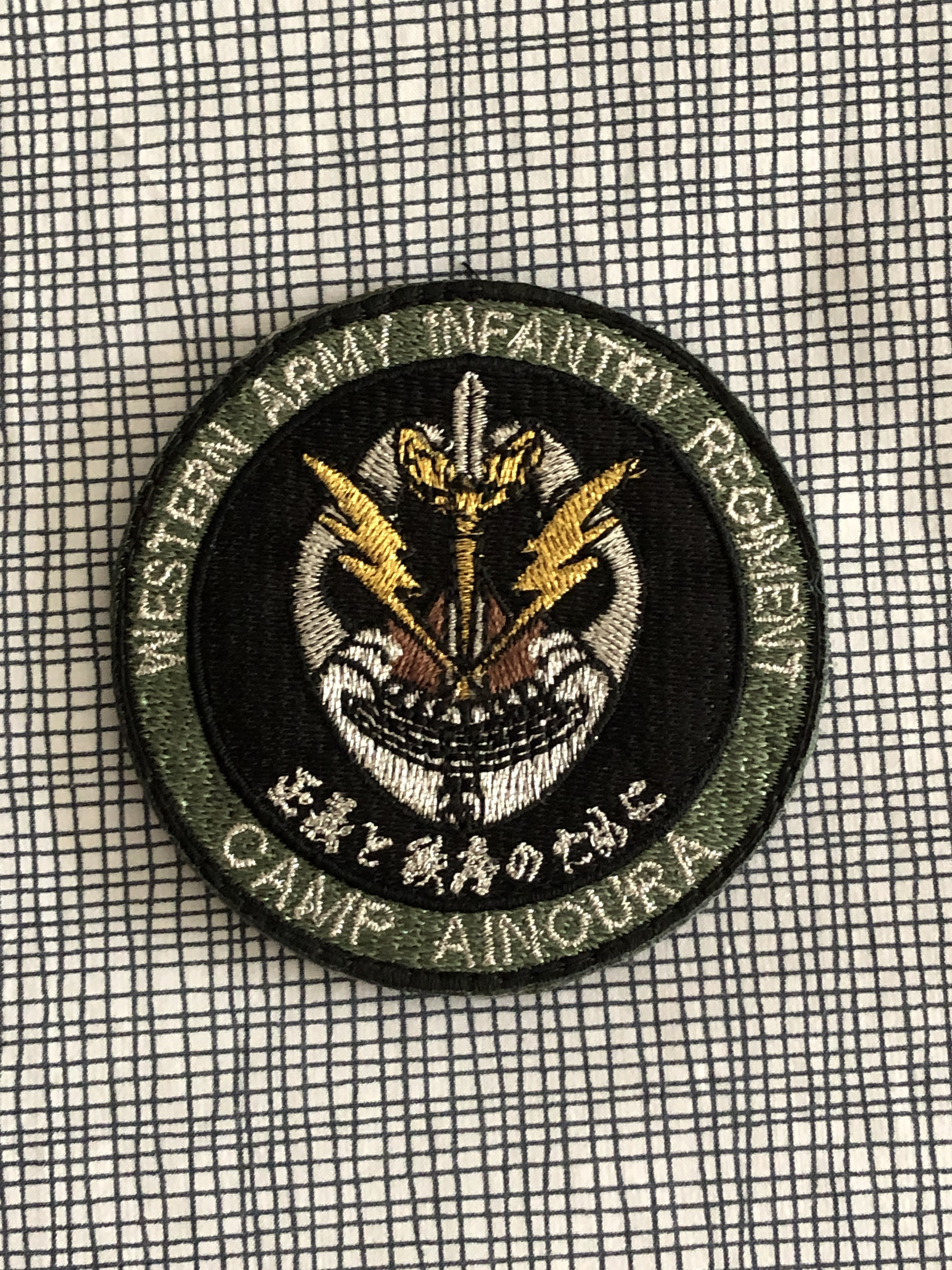
- WAIR Camp Ainoura patch
- Active: March 27, 2002–March 27, 2018
- Country: Japan
- Branch: Japan Ground Self-Defense Force
- Type: Marines
- Size: ~ 680
- Part of: Amphibious Rapid Deployment Brigade
- Garrison/HQ: Sasebo, Nagasaki
- Nickname: WAIR
- Engagements: Iraqi occupation

Commanders
- Current commander: Colonel Yoshiyuki Gotō
- Notable commanders: Colonel Akira Kurosawa

The 1st Amphibious Rapid Deployment Regiment (Japanese: 第1水陸機動連隊, romanized: Dai-ichi Suiriku Kidō Rentai), formerly known as the Western Army Infantry Regiment (Japanese: 西部方面普通科連隊, romanized: Seibu Hōmen Futsū-ka Rentai), is a Japanese light infantry regiment that specializes in amphibious operations. Its main purpose is to defend remote islands in Japanese territorial waters, specifically in the Kyushu region and south, including the islands of Okinawa prefecture. Although it is designated a regiment, it is comparable to a typical infantry battalion in size.

In April 2018, a new brigade modeled along the lines of the US Marine Corps was activated within the JGSDF, designated the Amphibious Rapid Deployment Brigade. When the new brigade was fully formed, and all troops and equipment assigned, the WAIR was reorganized into the 1st Amphibious Rapid Deployment Regiment under the brigade's command. The regiment is based at Sasebo in Nagasaki prefecture, in proximity to the large naval base there.

== History ==
A WAIR soldier holds his binoculars while kneeling on the ground during a training mission with US Marines in Camp Pendleton.

The WAIR was created on March 27, 2002, in order to defend remote islands in the western part of Japan in case of an invasion or enemy attacks, although they are also mandated to assist in search and rescue efforts in case their assistance is needed. It consists of Ranger-trained JGSDF soldiers and at the initial formation, it consisted of 600 soldiers.

In August 2010, a proposal was being considered by the Japanese government to convert a conventional [battalion strength] regiment from either the 8th Division or the 15th Brigade into a "US-style" amphibious unit, effectively giving the Western Army a battalion of marines for dealing with contingencies. In 2011, WAIR soldiers were trained alongside the 11th Marine Expeditionary Unit.

In 2013, troops from the Western Army Infantry Regiment deployed from the JS Hyuga and JS Shimokita for an amphibious warfare exercise in California.

=== Possible sister unit ===
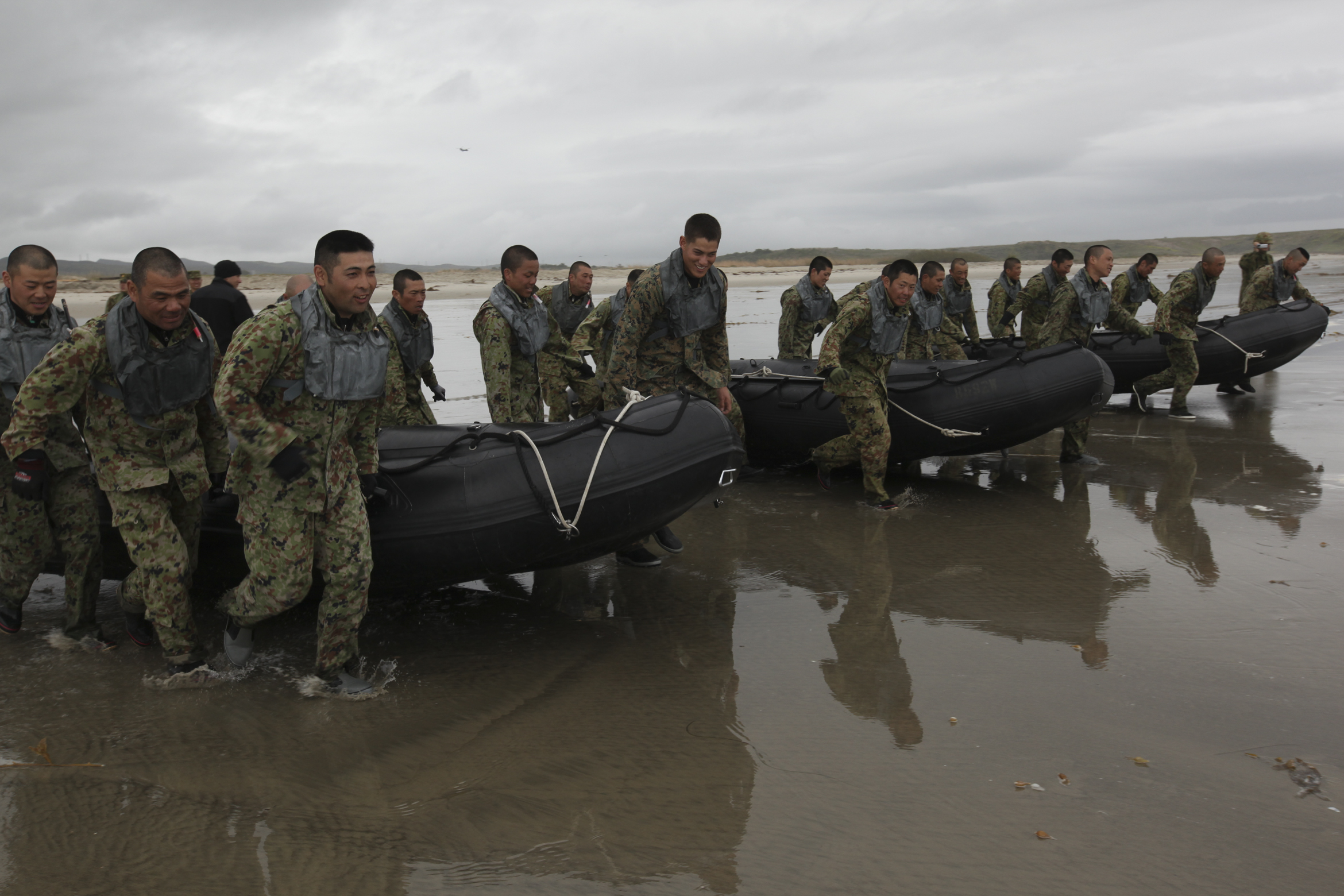
WAIR soldiers lift inflatable rafts during a training exercise alongside a US Marine, who is serving as their Japanese interpreter.

As of June 2013, as part of an ongoing expansion of defense capabilities in the Western Army's area of responsibility, the MOD were considering creating a special "isle assault unit", whose role would be the recapture of remote Japanese islands that had been invaded by a foreign power. It would share this mission with the pre-existing Western Army Infantry Regiment, itself currently undergoing an expansion in manpower and equipment (e.g. increase in authorised strength to 680 effectives, & adding (initially 4) AAVP-7A1's to its TOE). Equipment for the new unit on the other hand, may ultimately include the Type 16 maneuver combat vehicle and the light-weight combat vehicle (LCV) system alongside MV-22 Ospreys.

Its growth is part of the National Defense Programme Guidelines that were adopted by the Japanese Government in order to ascertain the JGSDF's capabilities in amphibious warfare in defending its islands in case of a future war involving Japan, which can bolster the Japanese–American military alliance.

When mustered, the new unit together with the WAIR would form a major part of the Western Army's first response to a hostile incursion in the more remote parts of its AOR.

=== New parent unit ===
In early September 2015, plans for the creation of the new unit, now referred to as the Amphibious Rapid Deployment Brigade were confirmed. The new unit was planned to be stood up by the end of FY2017, with a training corps to be set up in the interim (by the end of FY2016). As part of this plan, around 300 WAIR soldiers were sent to Camp Pendleton for direct training with US Marines in 2016.

The new marine brigade (ARDB) was established on March 27, 2018, and is commanded by Major General Shinichi Aoki.

== Training ==
Potential recruits for WAIR must be Ranger-qualified before they are accepted. Once in the unit, WAIR soldiers are trained in reconnaissance, survival skills and techniques.

== Equipment ==
WAIR forces were equipped with light infantry weapons, including mortars and Japanese-made military trucks such as the Mitsubishi Type 73. For current equipment see under: Amphibious Rapid Deployment Brigade.
