= Kiyochi Ogata =

Imperial Japanese Army officer

- 緒方 敬志
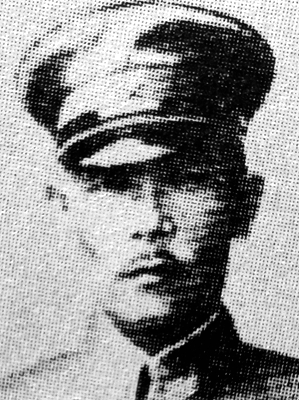
- Died: August 1, 1944; Tinian, Northern Mariana Islands
- Military career
- Allegiance: Empire of Japan
- Branch: Imperial Japanese Army
- Rank: Colonel
- Commands: Tinian Garrison
- Conflicts: World War II; Battle of Tinian

Kiyochi Ogata (绪方 敬志, Ogata Kiyochi; ? – August 1, 1944) was a colonel in the Imperial Japanese Army during World War II. He died during the Battle of Tinian.

== Battle of Tinian ==
Ogata was the commanding officer of Tinian, one of the Pacific Islands. He commanded 4,500 soldiers on the island, while the other troops were commanded either by the commander of the four airfields on Tinian, Captain Goichi Oie, or the commander of the naval forces stationed there, Vice Admiral Kakuji Kakuta. The Japanese, the 50th Division from Manchukuo arrived on Tinian to reinforce the existing garrison.

In preparation for the Battle of Tinian, Ogata concentrated his forces on the southwest of the island near Tinian Town, where the best landing beaches were located. The Americans anticipated this and so carried out a feint to convince the Japanese defenders that this was the Americans' intended actual landing site, bombarding the coastal guns with battleships and carrier-launched bombers and launching decoy landing craft. Instead, US marines landed upon the small beaches in the northwest of Tinian with innovative logistical support while facing minimal resistance, as Ogata thought that this location was impassible.

Ogata, who was taken by surprise, made the further mistake by following standard doctrine and fell into the trap set by the recently landed American attackers. Ogata's elite troops incurred high casualties by assembling in the open and conducting fruitless counterattacks to retake the landing beach, all of which were anticipated by the Americans who were well dug in and could bring their superior firepower to bear. The Japanese defenders had managed to move undetected at night, and were able to withdraw from contact with little loss whenever they wished to do so. Heavier American casualties might have been inflicted by a passive defense, taking advantage of their skill with camouflage, use of terrain, and emplacement of weapons, but this was not Japanese doctrine at the time.

Ogata and his remaining men were forced into the inner parts of the island. Ogata and Oie's bodies were not found, as they either committed ritual suicide or died in a banzai charge.
