= Battle of Tinian =

1944 World War II battle between the United States and Japan

Coordinates: 15°00′N 145°38′E

- Part of the Mariana and Palau Islands campaign of the Pacific Theater (World War II)
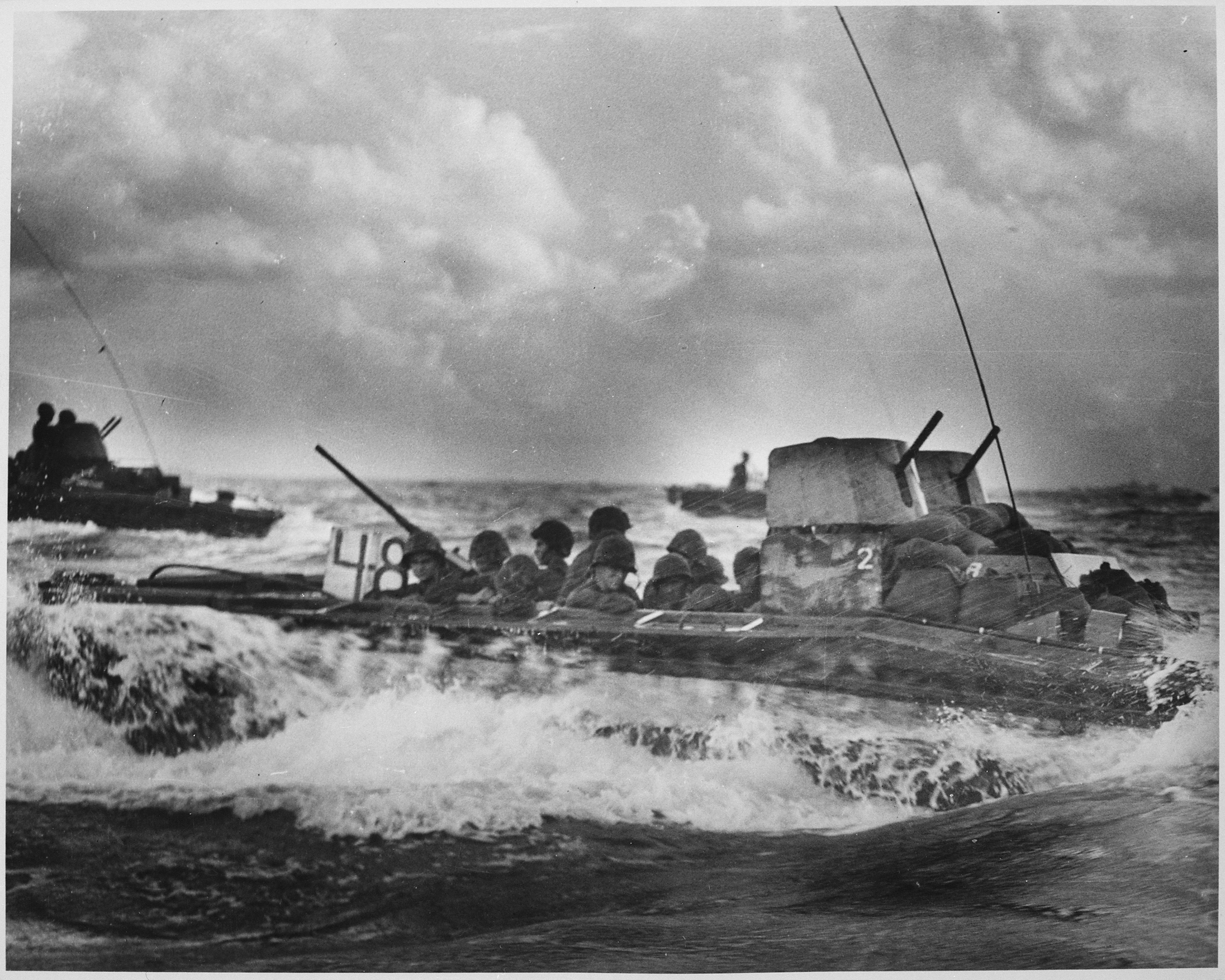
- An LVT churns through the surf bound for beaches of Tinian
Date	24 July – 1 August 1944 (1 week and 1 day)
Location	Tinian, Mariana Islands (modern-day Northern Mariana Islands, USA)
Result	American victory

Belligerents
United States	Japan

Commanders and leaders
Harry Schmidt; Thomas E. Watson; Clifton B. Cates	Kiyochi Ogata; Kakuji Kakuta; Goichi Oie

Units involved
V Amphibious Corps; 2nd Marine Division; 4th Marine Division; XXIV Corps Artillery	50th Infantry Regiment; 56th Naval Guard Force

Strength
40,000	9,000

Casualties and losses
Ashore: 290 killed; 1,515 wounded; 24 missing; Afloat: 63 killed; 177 wounded	5,745 dead; 404 captured
- 2,610 civilians dead

The Battle of Tinian was part of the Pacific campaign of World War II. It was fought between the United States and Japan on the island of Tinian in the Mariana Islands from 24 July until 1 August 1944. The battle saw napalm used for the first time.

At the Cairo Conference in December 1943, the US and British Combined Chiefs of Staff endorsed a two-pronged attack through the Central Pacific and Southwest Pacific Areas. On 12 March 1944, the Commander in Chief, Pacific Ocean Areas, Admiral Chester W. Nimitz, was directed to neutralize Truk and occupy the Mariana Islands. The Mariana Islands were targeted because of their location astride the Japanese line of communications. Tinian lay too close to Saipan to allow it to be bypassed and remain in Japanese hands. Following the conclusion of the Battle of Saipan on 9 July, Major General Harry Schmidt's V Amphibious Corps began preparations to invade nearby Tinian.

The Japanese garrison was commanded by Colonel Kiyochi Ogata, the commander of the 50th Infantry Regiment. This regiment was part of the 5,000 Army troops on the island. There were also about 4,000 Imperial Japanese Navy personnel on Tinian, the main force being the 56th Naval Guard Force, under the command of Captain Goichi Oie. Most of the island was surrounded by coral cliffs, so Ogata concentrated his forces on the southwest of the island, where the best landing beaches were located.

Major General Clifton B. Cates's 4th Marine Division landed on Tinian on 24 July 1944, supported by naval bombardment and the guns of the XXIV Corps Artillery, firing across the strait from Saipan. Instead of landing in the southwest, they landed on the northwest coast, where there were two small beaches that were lightly defended. These beaches were flanked by low coral cliffs that the marines were able to surmount with the aid of ramps mounted on modified amphibious tractors (LVTs).

A successful feint in the southwest by Major General Thomas E. Watson's 2nd Marine Division distracted defenders from the actual landing site on the north of the island. The 2nd Marine Division then landed behind the 4th Marine Division. The weather worsened on 28 July, damaging the pontoon causeways and interrupting the unloading of supplies, but on 30 July the 4th Marine Division occupied Tinian Town and the airfield. Japanese remnants conducted a last stand in the caves and ravines of a limestone ridge on the south portion of the island. Although the island was declared secure on 1 August, mopping up patrols continued into 1945.

Tinian became an important base for further US operations in the Pacific. North Field became operational in February 1945 and West Field in March. The Seabees built six 8,500-foot (2,600 m) runways for the Twentieth Air Force's Boeing B-29 Superfortress bombers. Bombers based on Tinian took part in the bombing of Tokyo in March 1945 and the atomic bombings of Hiroshima and Nagasaki in August 1945.

== Background ==
Map of the battle

=== Strategy ===
After World War I, the United States had developed a series of contingency plans for the event of a war with Japan known as the Orange plans. These envisaged an advance through the Marshall and Caroline Islands to the Philippines, from whence Japan could be blockaded. The Mariana Islands figured only incidentally in the plans, as they lay north of the direct route between Hawaii and the Philippines. During World War II, the islands attracted the attention of naval and air strategists. At the Casablanca Conference in January 1943, the US and British Combined Chiefs of Staff had endorsed an offensive in the Central Pacific along the lines envisaged in the Orange plans. In his formulation of the strategy, the Commander in Chief, United States Fleet, Admiral Ernest J. King, specifically mentioned the Mariana Islands as "the key to the situation because of their location on the Japanese line of communications."

The Joint Chiefs of Staff envisaged the Marianas as a naval base, but another rationale for the capture of the Mariana Islands emerged with the development of the long-range Boeing B-29 Superfortress bomber. From the Mariana Islands, the B-29s could reach all the most significant industrial targets in Japan, and they could be supported by sea. The air staff planners began incorporating the Mariana Islands into their long-range plans in September 1943. The Combined Chiefs endorsed this at the Cairo Conference in December, along with a two-pronged offensive, with the Central Pacific drive in conjunction with one along the north coast of New Guinea. In response, the Commander in Chief, Pacific Ocean Areas (CINCPOA), Admiral Chester W. Nimitz, produced a campaign plan called Operation Granite, which tentatively scheduled the capture of Mariana Islands of Saipan, Tinian and Guam for November 1944 as the culmination of the Central Pacific campaign.

By February 1944, there was consideration of advancing the Operation Granite timetable by bypassing Truk and heading directly for Palau or the Marianas after the capture of the Marshall Islands. On 7 March, Nimitz and his Deputy Chief of Staff, Rear Admiral Forrest P. Sherman met with the Joint Chiefs of Staff in Washington, DC, where they were questioned by the Chief of Staff of the United States Army, General George C. Marshall, and the Chief of Staff to the Commander in Chief, Admiral William D. Leahy. Sherman argued that the neutralization of Truk required the occupation of the Mariana Islands to cut the air route to Truk from Japan. On 12 March, the Joint Chiefs of Staff directed Nimitz to neutralize Truk and occupy the Mariana Islands.

Tinian was considered a target from the outset, Lieutenant General Holland M. Smith's Northern Troops and Landing Force (NTLF) was ordered to "land on, seize, occupy and defend Saipan. Then be prepared to seize Tinian on order." The American forces assaulted Saipan on 15 June. The Battle of Saipan lasted until 9 July, when the island was declared "secured". The cost was high: 14,111 of the 71,034 NTLF personnel were killed, wounded or missing in action. Mopping up operations continued until October, but preparations began immediately for the attack on Tinian.

Plans to capture Tinian were prepared concurrently with those to capture Saipan. Tinian lay only 3.5 miles (5.6 km) from the southern tip of Saipan, and its proximity to Saipan meant that while it remained in Japanese hands, Japanese aircraft could attack Saipan by staging though Tinian. The garrison might raid Saipan, and they could observe ship and aircraft movements on Saipan and communicate them to Tokyo.

Tinian also had value in its own right, as its flat terrain made it highly suitable for the development of air bases. There were already airfields that looked promising for development into B-29 airfields. Ushi Point Airfield (Airfield No. 1) was the main airfield; it had a hard-surfaced runway 4,750 feet (1,450 m) long. Two other airfields were in use and another was under construction: Airfield No. 3, which lay immediately south of no.1; Airfield No. 2, at Gurguan Point; and the unfinished Airfield No. 4 near Tinian Town.

=== Geography ===
Along with the other Mariana Islands, Tinian was claimed for Spain by Miguel López de Legazpi in 1565. Guam was seized by the United States in the Spanish-American War, and Spain sold the remaining islands to Germany. They were occupied by Japan during World War I and became part of Japan's South Seas Mandate. Tinian lay just 3 1/2 miles (10 km) from the southern tip of Saipan. It covered about 50 square miles (130 km^{2}), measuring 10 1/4 miles (20 km) from north to south, and 5 miles (8 km) across at its widest point. The terrain was generally low and flat, making it suitable for airfields. There were two hills in the north: the 390-foot (120 m) Mount Maga and the 564-foot (172 m) Mount Lasso. There was also a rugged 580-foot (180 m) limestone hill mass of cliffs and ravines in the south. About 90 percent of the island (approximately 15,000 acres (6,000 ha)) was covered in sugar cane fields. The square fields gave the island a checker board look from the air. Fields were surrounded by drainage ditches or windbreaks of trees or hedgerows.

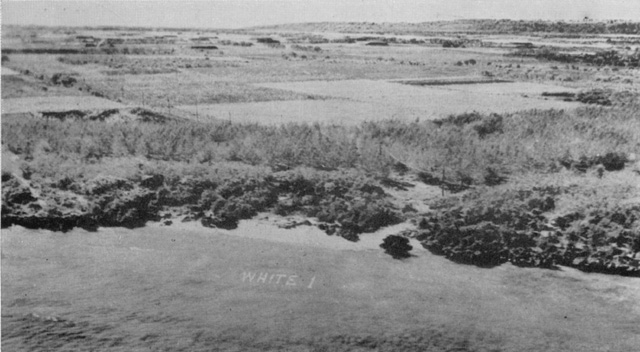
Oblique photograph of White Beach 1 taken before naval gunfire, artillery, air and bulldozers altered its appearance.

Most of the island was encircled by jagged limestone cliffs that ranged from 6 to 100 feet (2 to 30 m) high. There were only a few beaches, which the Americans designated by colors. The best beaches were around Sunharon Bay in the southeast: Blue Beach, 1 mile (1.6 km) south of Tinian Town, was 600 yards (550 m) long; Green Beach One, located between the two piers at Tinian Town, was also 600 yards (550 m) long; Green Beach Two, at the southern end of Tinian Town, was 400 yards (370 m) long; Red Beach One and Two were north of the piers, with a combined width of 825 yards (754 m); and Orange Beach, 1/2 mile (0.80 km) north of Red Beach One, was 340 yards (310 m) long.

There were two beaches on the east coast at Asiga Bay: the 355-yard (325 m) Yellow Beach One and the 200-yard (180 m) Yellow Beach Two. These were flanked by cliffs and subject to heavy surf when there was an easterly wind. There were also two small beaches on the northwest coast: the 65-to-75-yard (59 to 69 m) White Beach One and the 200-yard (180 m) White Beach Two. The small size of the White and Yellow beaches made them unattractive: a division normally required a landing beach 1,000 yards (910 m) long.

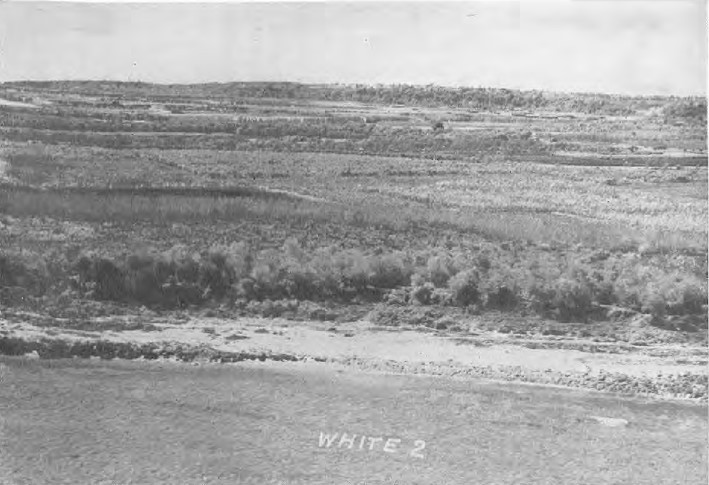
Oblique photograph of White Beach 2

There was little seasonal variation in temperature, which ranged from an average of 76 °F (24 °C) in January to 80 °F (27 °C) in June, but the average humidity in those months was 78 and 84 percent, respectively. Fair weather prevailed during the dry season from November to March, but the wet season from April to November was characterized by frequent rains and occasional typhoons. Sunharon Bay was little more than an anchorage, and was unusable in rough weather.

According to a 1 January 1944 census, Tinian had a population of 18,000 Japanese civilians, most of whom worked in the sugar cane industry, and 26 ethnic Chamorro people; most of the original population had been forcibly removed to other islands. The main settlements were Tinian Town in the south and two small villages around Ushi Point Airfield in the north. The former was the administrative center of the island, while the latter housed airfield workers. The primary road network consisted of roads approximately 18 feet (5.5 m) wide and surfaced with crushed coral. They were generally straight, following the edges of the cane fields. Approximately 40 miles (64 km) of narrow gauge railways connected the sugar plantations with Tinian Town.

== Opposing forces and plans ==
=== Japanese ===
The senior Japanese officer on Tinian was Vice Admiral Kakuji Kakuta, the commander of First Air Fleet. His headquarters was in Manila but he was on Tinian on an inspection tour when US aerial operations in the Marianas Islands began on 11 June and became cut off. He exercised no command authority over the army troops on the island, and the naval troops were not subject to his direct command.

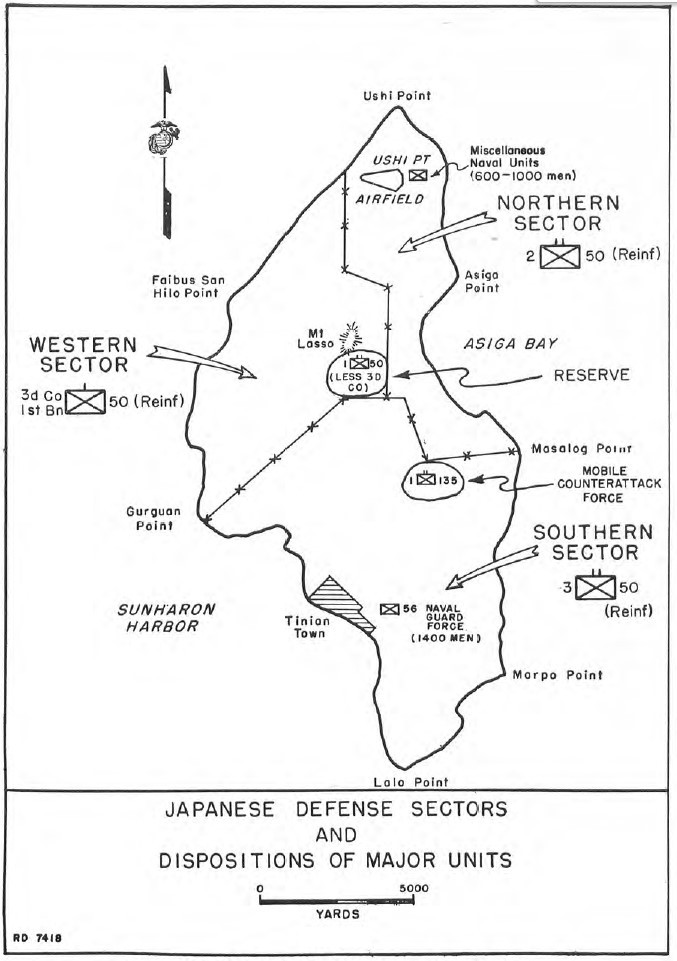
Japanese defense sectors and dispositions of major units

The Imperial Japanese Army force defending the island was the 50th Infantry Regiment, commanded by Colonel Kiyochi Ogata. This was part of the 29th Division, all the rest of which was located on Guam. The regiment was formerly based at Mukden in China, and had moved to Tinian in March 1944. It had three infantry battalions, a mountain artillery battalion with twelve 75mm guns, an anti-tank company with six 37 mm anti-tank guns, and a company of the 18th Infantry Regiment with twelve light tanks. The 1st Battalion, 135th Infantry Regiment, under the command of Captain Bunzo Izumi. Part of the 43rd Division, it had been formed in Nagoya in July 1943. It was normally based on Saipan, but was conducting amphibious landing exercises on Tinian on 11 June and became cut off when Saipan was invaded. It provided a fourth infantry battalion that Ogata incorporated into the island's defense. The Army forces on Tinian totaled about 5,000 men. Most were well-trained combat veterans with prior combat experience in the war in China. They were skilled in camouflage and the use of their weapons. They were well-equipped, in many cases with new weapons, and their morale was high.

The main Imperial Japanese Navy force on Tinian was the 56th Naval Guard Force (Keibitai), under the command of Captain Goichi Oie. He accepted Ogata as the commander on Tinian, but to avoid embarrassment, he did not inform his subordinates that their orders came from an Army officer. His force of 1,400 troops and 600 laborers was equipped with three 6-inch and ten 140 mm coast defence guns, and ten 120 mm and four 76.2 mm general purpose guns, twenty-four 25 mm and six 7 cm antiaircraft guns, and three 12 cm dual-purpose guns. Along with airfield construction crews, flight technicians and staff, there were about 4,000 sailors of various units on Tinian. Most of the naval personnel had some training as infantry. In addition, there were three civilian defence organizations of little military value, the Civilian Militia, the Home Guard Organization, and Youth Organization, and about sixty comfort women, none of whom survived the battle.

After Saipan had fallen on 9 July, the prospects for the garrison of Tinian were grim. Ogata expected that Tinian would be the next target, and on 25 June he issued an operational order that announced: "the enemy on Saipan... can be expected to be planning a landing on Tinian. The area of that landing is estimated to be either Tinian Harbor or Asiga (northeast coast) Harbor." He adhered to the Japanese doctrine of defense against amphibious attacks at the water's edge. Each of the sector commanders was ordered to "be prepared to destroy the enemy at the beach, but be prepared to shift two-thirds of the force elsewhere."

Ogata was aided by the geography of Tinian, which limited the possible landing sites. He positioned the 3rd Battalion, 50th Infantry Regiment and most of the heavy weapons of the 56th Naval Guard Force, around Sunharon Bay beaches. The Northern Sector around Asiga Bay was covered by the 2nd Battalion, 50th Infantry Regiment. He did not expect anything more than a raid on the beaches in the west, so this was assigned to the 3rd Company, 1st Battalion, 50th Infantry Regiment. The rest of the 1st Battalion was dug in around Mount Lasso. The 1st Battalion, 135th Infantry Regiment formed a mobile counterattack force, along with the tanks and a mobile artillery contingent of twelve Type 94 75 mm mountain guns. The reserve was positioned so as to quickly reach either the Sunharon Bay or Asiga bay, depending on where the Americans made their main effort.

=== United States ===
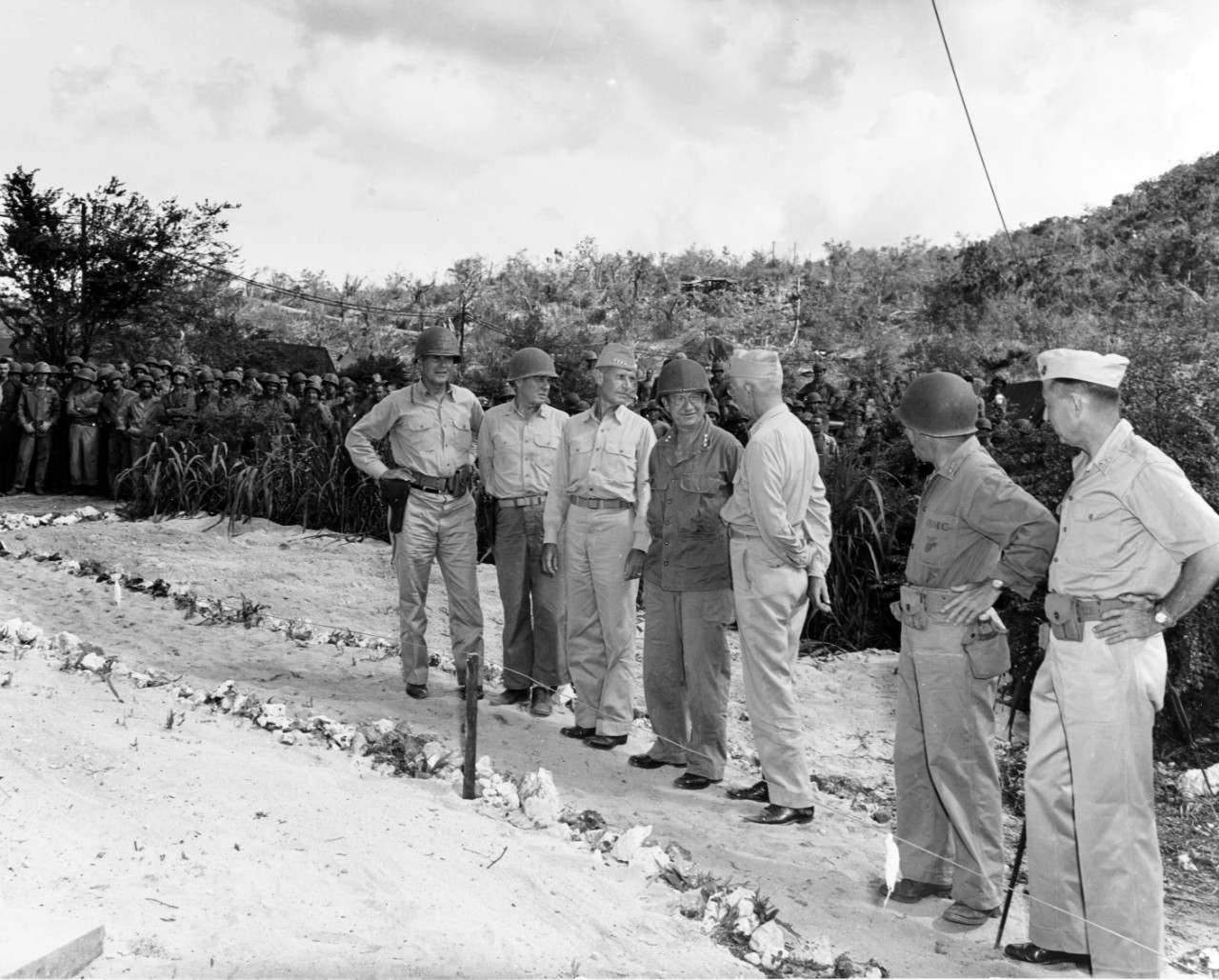
Senior US commanders on Tinian. Left to right: Rear Admiral Harry W. Hill, Major General Harry Schmidt, Admiral Raymond A. Spruance, Lieutenant General Holland M. Smith, Vice Admiral Richmond K. Turner, Major General Thomas E. Watson and Major General Clifton B. Cates

The American forces were part of Admiral Raymond A. Spruance's Fifth Fleet. The Joint Amphibious Forces (Task Force 51) were led by Vice Admiral Richmond K. Turner and the expeditionary troops (Task Force 56) by Lieutenant General Holland M. Smith. For the battle of Saipan, Turner had concurrently commanded the landing force (Task Force 52) and Smith had also commanded the NTLF and V Amphibious Corps, but with simultaneous operations on Guam in prospect, it was desirable for these roles to be separated. On 12 July, Smith became the commander of the newly established Fleet Marine Force, Pacific and handed over command of the V Amphibious Corps and NTLF (Task Group 56.1) to Major General Harry Schmidt. Command of the amphibious forces in the Tinian operation (Task Force 52) was entrusted to Turner's former deputy, Rear Admiral Harry W. Hill, on 15 July. Although Turner and Smith remained in command of Task Forces 51 and 56 respectively, they sailed for Guam on 20 July, leaving the operation entirely in the hands of Hill and Schmidt.

For the Tinian operation, the V Amphibious Corps had the 2nd Marine Division, commanded by Major General Thomas E. Watson and the 4th Marine Division, which was commanded by Major General Clifton B. Cates, who had succeeded Schmidt. Both had seen service earlier in the Pacific War: the 2nd Marine Division on Guadalcanal and Tarawa, and the 4th Marine Division in the Battle of Kwajalein, and had participated in the recent fighting on Saipan, where they had incurred 6,170 and 6,612 battle casualties respectively. They had absorbed a single replacement draft of 1,268 men before the fighting began again on Tinian, but remained understrength, and much of their equipment had been worn out through combat and hard use.

The V Amphibious Corps had the support of Brigadier General Arthur M. Harper's XXIV Corps Artillery with its two battalions of 155 mm guns and two battalions of 155 mm howitzers. For the Tinian operation, Harper also had command of the four battalions of the 27th Infantry Division Artillery and five Marine Corps 105 mm howitzer battalions, two each from the two marine divisions and one from the V Amphibious Corps, for a total of thirteen battalions, each of which had twelve guns or howitzers. The rest of the 27th Infantry Division, except for the 105th Infantry, was in reserve, but on four hours' notice to embark for Tinian.

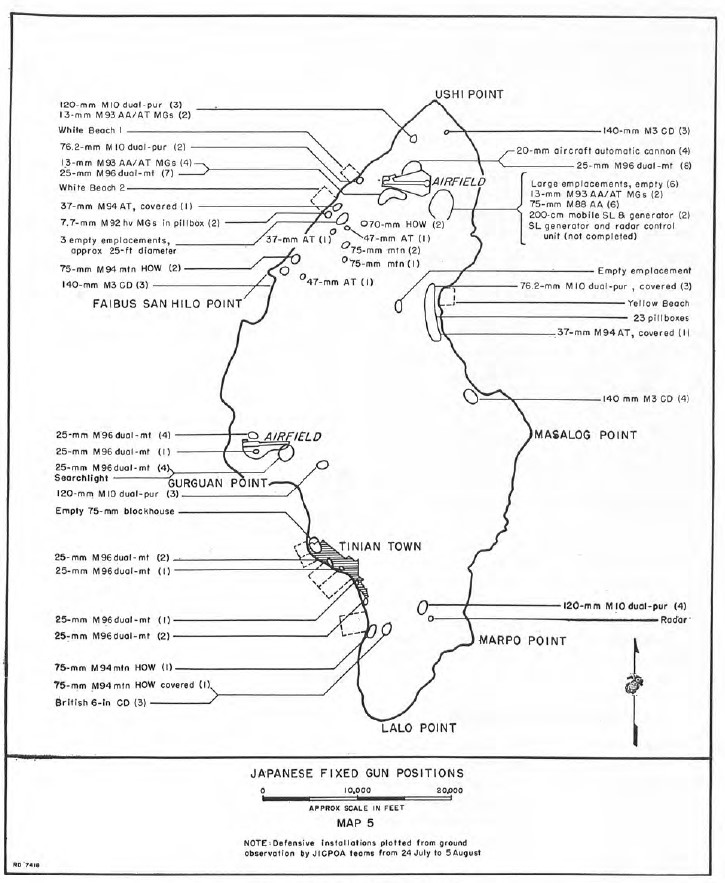
Japanese fixed gun positions on Tinian

American intelligence about Tinian and the Japanese defenses there was excellent. The Joint Intelligence Center Pacific Ocean Area (JICPOA), under the command of Brigadier General Joseph J. Twitty, assembled intelligence obtained from imagery intelligence, human intelligence and reference information, backed up by Ultra intelligence derived from code breaking and signals intelligence. JICPOA produced a report on Tinian's hydrography and geography on 10 May 1944, that also detailed the locations of many of the defenses, and issued a series of topographic maps. A series of oblique aerial photographs were taken of Tinian's beaches. The headquarters of the Japanese 31st Army on Saipan was overrun in mid-June, and captured documents provided a full order of battle of the Japanese forces on Tinian. The Americans estimated the strength of the Japanese garrison as 8,039, which was quite accurate. The XXIV Corps Artillery began bombarding Tinian on 20 June, even as the fighting on Saipan continued, and its Saipan-based observation aircraft conducted daily flights over Tinian.

The intelligence reports revealed that the best landing beaches were around Sunharon Bay, but they were also the most heavily defended. The staff of the 4th Marine Division, particularly the plans officer, Lieutenant Colonel Evans F. Carlson, preferred to land in the north, where the beaches were poorer but the defenses were weaker and tactical surprise could be attained. Independently, Hill's staff arrived at the same conclusion. Turner was not convinced. "If we go ashore at Tinian Town," Smith told him, "we'll have another Tarawa. Sure as hell! The Japs will murder us. What's more, we probably will be repulsed, and that will upset our entire timetable. What do you say to that?"

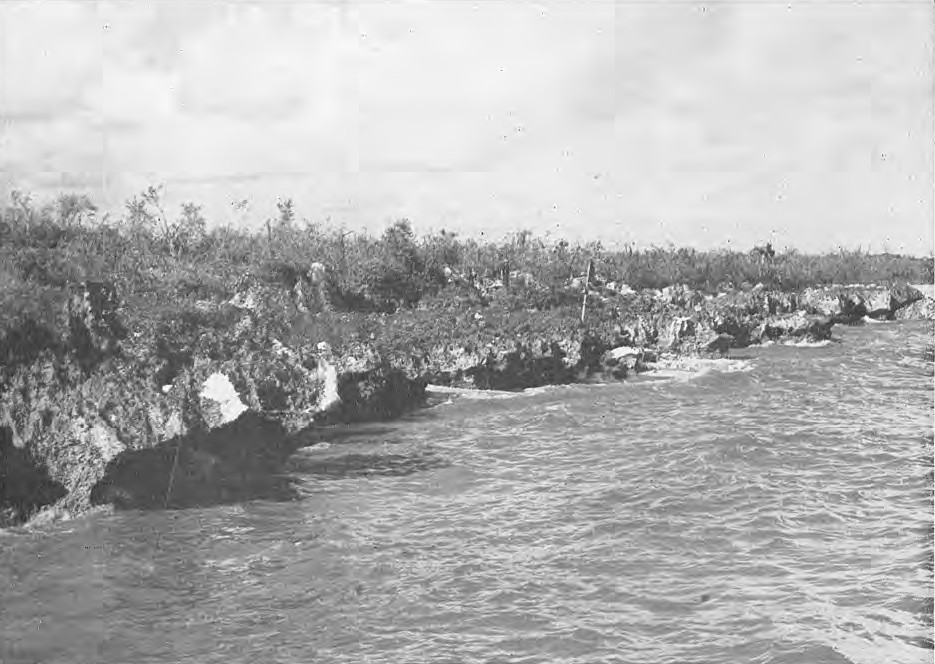
The low cliffs between the two White beaches

Turner noted that the Sunharon Bay beaches had good gradients and inland approaches, that there was a protected harbor for small craft, and facilities for unloading supplies. Whereas the northern beaches were too small to land and support a force of the size contemplated, and were exposed to the weather, so if it turned bad the movement of supplies from Saipan could be obstructed or halted. An advance from north to south would likely take longer than one from east to west, and while artillery support from Saipan would be available in the early stages, unfavorable weather could prevent it being moved to Tinian to cover the advance once it moved further south.

In view of these objections, Schmidt ordered a reconnaissance of the Yellow and White Beaches. On the night of 10/11 July, Companies A and B of Captain James L. Jones's V Amphibious Corps Amphibious Reconnaissance Battalion and Underwater Demolition Teams 5 and 7 set out in the high-speed transports USS Gilmer and Stringham. They were launched in rubber boats and paddled to within 500 yards (460 m) of the shore, then swam the rest of the way. The underwater demolition teams investigated the offshore reefs while the marines swam ashore and studied the beaches. Yellow Beach 1 was found to be strung with a double apron wire obstacle, with cliffs to the south that were 20 to 25 feet (6.1 to 7.6 m) high and unscalable without ladders or cargo nets.

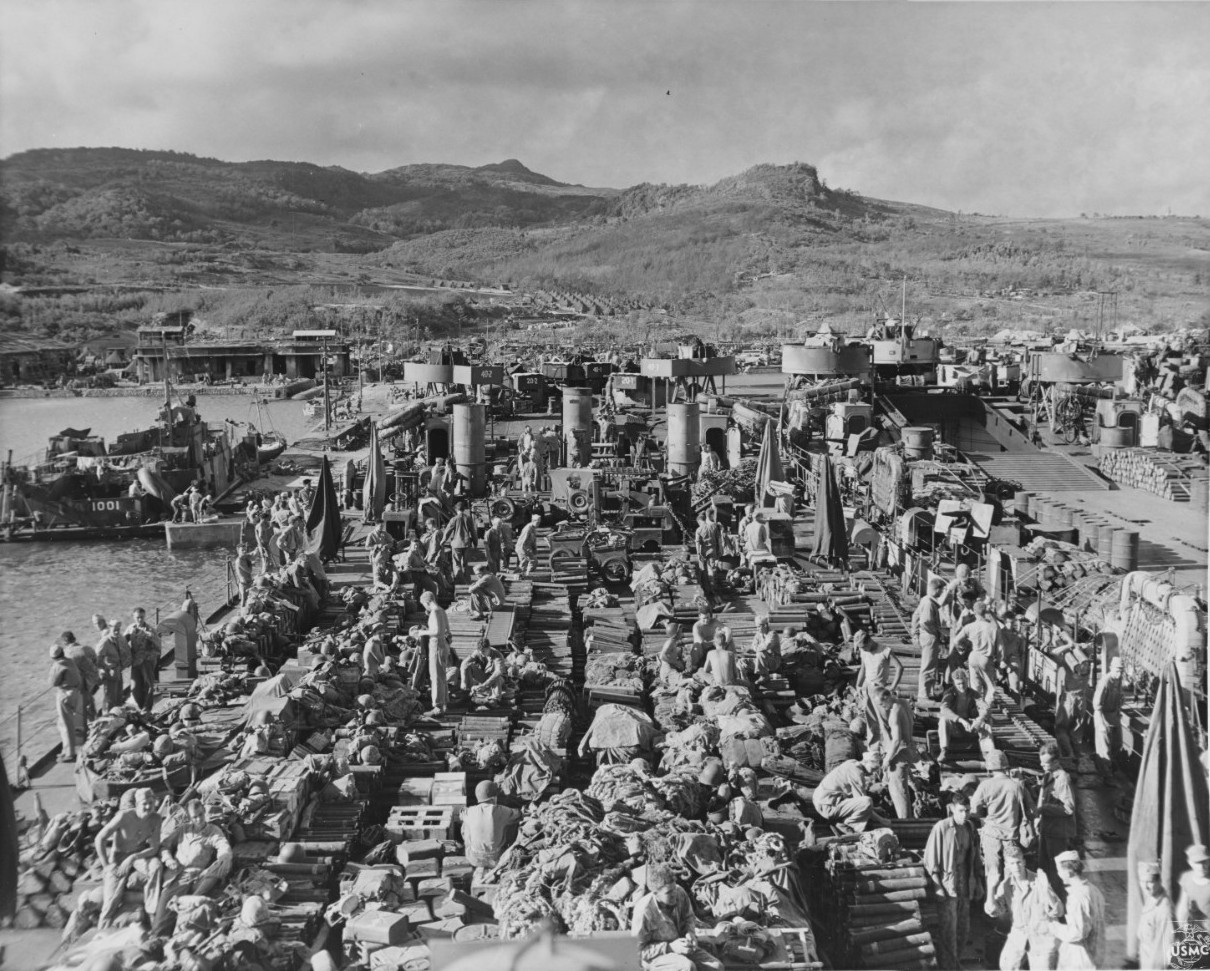
Marines load supplies aboard two LSTs in preparation for the assault on Tinian

A strong current was encountered by the groups sent to reconnoitre the White Beaches, and the rubber boats wound up too far north. Consequently, the reconnaissance of White Beach 1 was carried out by the group intended to land on White Beach 2, and that of White Beach 2 had to be carried out the following night. They found that although White Beach 1 was only 60 yards (55 m) long, the cliffs for 150 yards (140 m) on either side were only 6 to 10 feet (1.8 to 3.0 m) high with small breaks, and could be negotiated by infantry without ladders or nets. Only the central 70 yards (64 m) of White Beach 2 could be reached by amphibian vehicles. Both White Beaches had gentle grades and it was possible for LCVPs to land on the reef 50 yards (46 m) from the beach and for infantry to wade ashore from there.

With this information in hand, a conference was held on board Turner's flagship, the USS Rocky Mount, on 12 July. Schmidt made the case for a landing on the White Beaches, citing six factors: (1) that a landing at Sunharon Bay would be too costly; (2) that the XXIV Corps Artillery could cover the beaches from Saipan; (3) the airfield at Ushi Point could be quickly captured and utilized; (4) tactical surprise could be attained; (5) the whole operation could be conducted from Saipan as a shore-to-shore movement; and (6) supplies could be preloaded on vehicles and driven straight to dumps, thereby avoiding congestion on the beaches. Spruance called for a vote, in order of seniority, and Watson, Schmidt, Hill and Smith voted for the White Beach plan. To Spruance's relief, Turner agreed to make the decision unanimous. On 20 July, Spruance confirmed the day of the assault, J-Day (or Jig-Day, using the phonetic alphabet of the time), as 24 July. Hill then chose 0730 as H-Hour.

== Battle ==
=== Bombardment ===
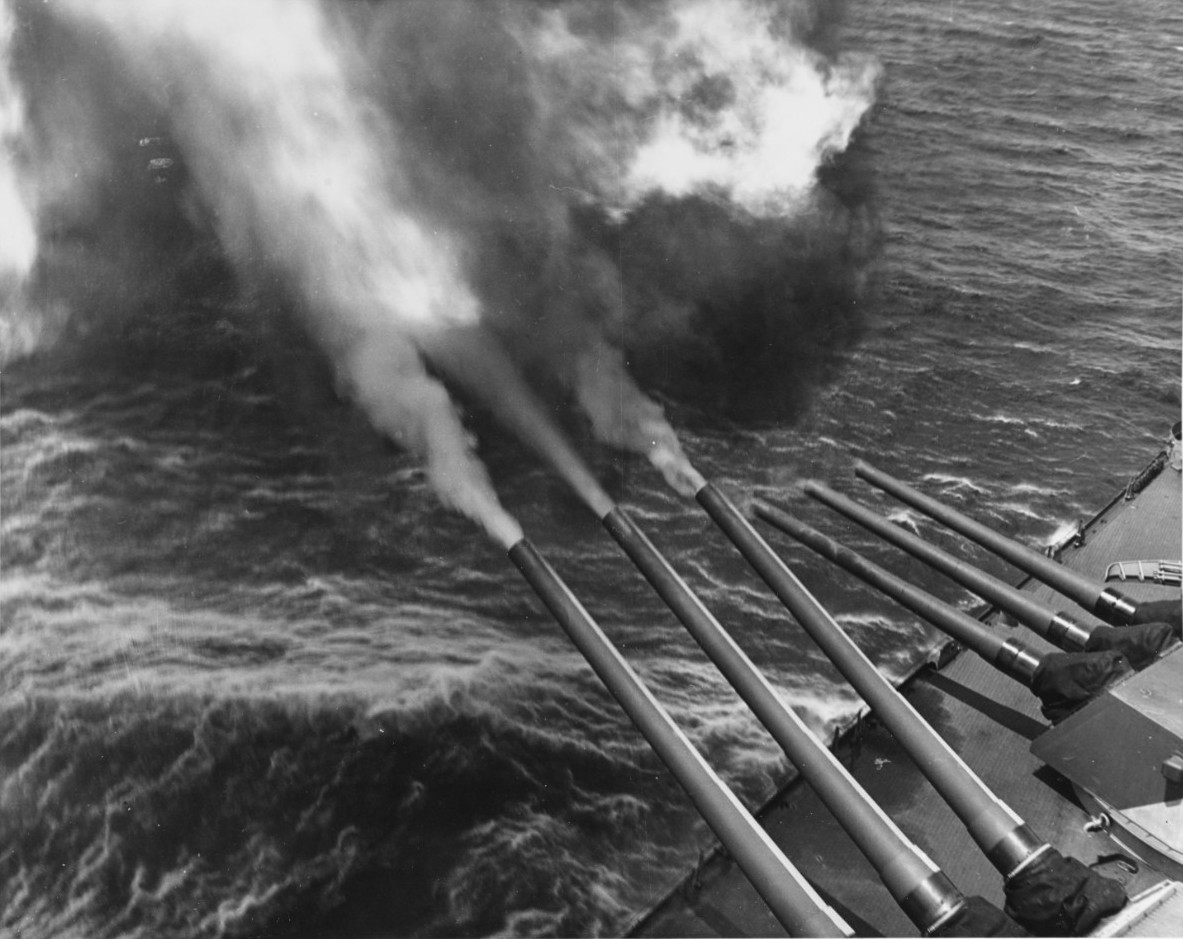
USS Iowa fires a salvo from number 2 16" turret during the bombardment of Tinian on 14–15 June

Artillery bombardment of Tinian commenced on 20 June when Battery B of the 531st Field Artillery Battalion began shelling targets on Tinian with its 155 mm "Long Tom" guns. In the days leading up to the landing, the XXIV Corps Artillery used 24,536 rounds on 1,509 counter-battery fire, harassing fire and area bombardment missions. The XXIV Corps Artillery had its own observation aircraft, nine Piper L-4 Grasshoppers based at Aslito Field on Saipan. One was forced to ditch off Tinian Town on 28 July due to engine failure. The crew was rescued by the cruiser USS Louisville but the aircraft was lost. Another was forced down by Japanese fire the following day but landed safely behind American lines. The Marine artillery had the support of the Stinson OY Sentinel observation aircraft of VMO-2 and VMO-4.

The US naval bombardment commenced on 13 June, with the fire support ships of Task Force 52 engaging targets on Tinian that could interfere with operations on Saipan. On 25 June, the destroyer escort USS Elden and destroyer USS Bancroft detected Japanese barges attempting to leave Sunharon Harbor and destroyed them. The bombardment was stepped up on 26 June, when the cruisers USS Indianapolis, Birmingham and Montpelier began a week of systematic attacks. On 23 July, the day before the landing, three battleships, five cruisers and sixteen destroyers participated in the bombardment. The battleship USS Colorado engaged the three 140 mm coast defense guns at Faibus San Hilo Point, which could enfilade the White Beaches from defilade of the artillery on Saipan. Sixty 16-inch shells completely destroyed the battery. Meanwhile, the battleships USS Tennessee and California fired 480 14-inch and 800 5-inch rounds into Tinian Town, reducing it to rubble.

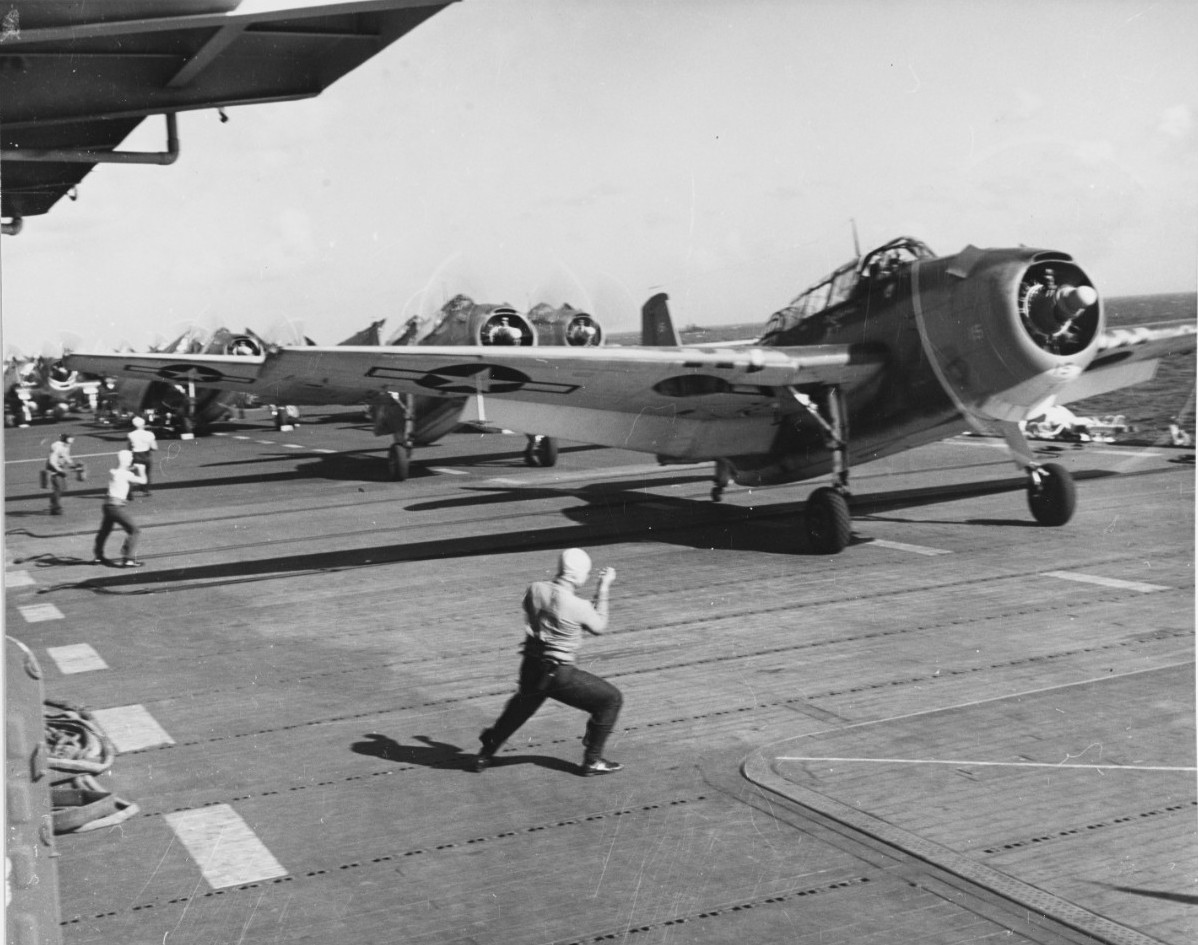
TBM Avenger bombers prepare to take off from the USS Monterey to attack targets on Tinian

The bombardment lifted for three periods of 40 to 60 minutes to allow for aerial bombardment. At least 200 sorties were flown from the aircraft carriers USS Essex and Langley, and another 50 or more from the escort carriers USS Gambier Bay and Kitkun Bay. Aslito Field-based Army Air Force Republic P-47 Thunderbolts of the 318th Fighter Group flew more than 100 sorties. The group's 19th Fighter Squadron had arrived on Saipan on 22 June after being catapulted from the escort carriers USS Manila Bay and Natoma Bay, and had flown its first mission over Tinian that day. Attempts by destroyers to burn wooded areas with white phosphorus and thermite on 18 and 19 July failed due to the wet foliage, so napalm was tried for the first time. The 318th Fighter Group flew 18 napalm sorties, but results were inconclusive, as the best mixture had not yet been devised, but it had some success setting the canefields alight.

On J-Day, 24 July, a feint was made to distract the defenders from the actual landing site. This was carried out by the 2nd and 8th Marines of the 2nd Marine Division. The attack transports USS Calvert, Fuller, Heywood, J. Franklin Bell and Knox and troopships John Land and Winged Arrow took them to a point about 4 miles (6.4 km) offshore from Tinian Town, where they boarded landing craft using cargo nets, and then climbed back again. The empty landing craft then made a run for the shore until Japanese shore batteries started firing at them. The landing craft regrouped and made a second run, but turned back again 400 yards (370 m) from the beach. Around 10:00 the transports recovered the landing craft, and headed for the transport area off the White Beaches.

While covering the feint, Colorado and the destroyer Norman Scott were hit by the three Japanese 6-inch guns, which were concealed in caves 3,500 yards (3,200 m) southwest of the Tinian Town pier. Colorado was hit twenty-two times, killing 43 men and wounding 198. Norman Scott was hit six times, killing the captain, Commander Seymore Owens, and 18 of his men and wounding 47. Approximately at this time, the naval force was ordered to withdraw from Tinian. However, the Norman Scott was dead in the water, and certain to be sunk. The commander of the cruiser USS Cleveland ignored orders reversed direction and returned to Tinian. He interposed his ship between the Norman Scott and the Japanese guns, taking hits to protect the Norman Scott. Eventually the crew of the Norman Scott got the ship in motion and withdrew with the rest of the naval fleet. It is generally accepted that the Cleveland saved the Norman Scott from being sunk in this battle. Colorado, Cleveland and the destroyer Remey silenced the battery, but did not destroy it; this was accomplished on 28 July by Tennessee, with 70 14-inch and 150 5-inch rounds.

=== Landing ===
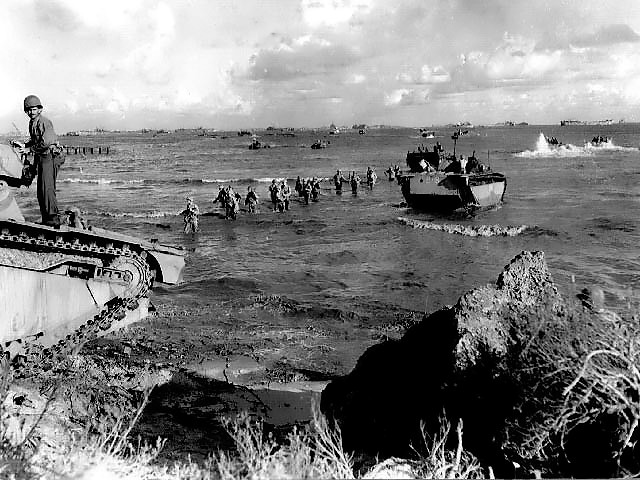
Men wade ashore from landing craft while LVTs move to and from the beachhead. In the background are ships that took part in the landing.

The majority of the ships for the assault of Tinian were loaded at Tanapag Harbor on Saipan by troops of the Saipan Island Command. Ten preloaded tank landing ships (LSTs) with three and a half days' supply of water, rations, medical supplies and ammunition on their top decks were allocated to each division and eight to the NTLF. Fourteen pontoon barges were loaded with drums of fuel and towed to positions off the reef to supply fuel to amphibious vehicles and landing craft. After the initial landing, loaded trucks and trailers were embarked on landing craft, which shuttled them to Tinian where they unloaded at dumps and then returned on landing craft. Twenty landing craft mechanized (LCMs), ten landing craft tank (LCTs) and eight LSTs were assigned to this role, along with 88 2½-ton 6×6 trucks and 25 trailers.

Marine divisions each had two battalions of 75 mm pack howitzers and two of 105 mm howitzers. The latter remained behind on Saipan, but the 4th Marine Division was given the 1st and 2nd Battalions of the 10th Marines, so it had four battalions of 75 mm pack howitzers. Two amphibious truck (DUKW) companies were assigned to move them ashore quickly. Each battalion was carried in an LST. Tanks were loaded onto LCMs. Eighteen of the LCMs, each carrying one tank, were each embarked on the dock landing ships (LSDs) USS Ashland and Belle Grove. Another ten tank-carrying LCMs sailed to Tinian under their own power.

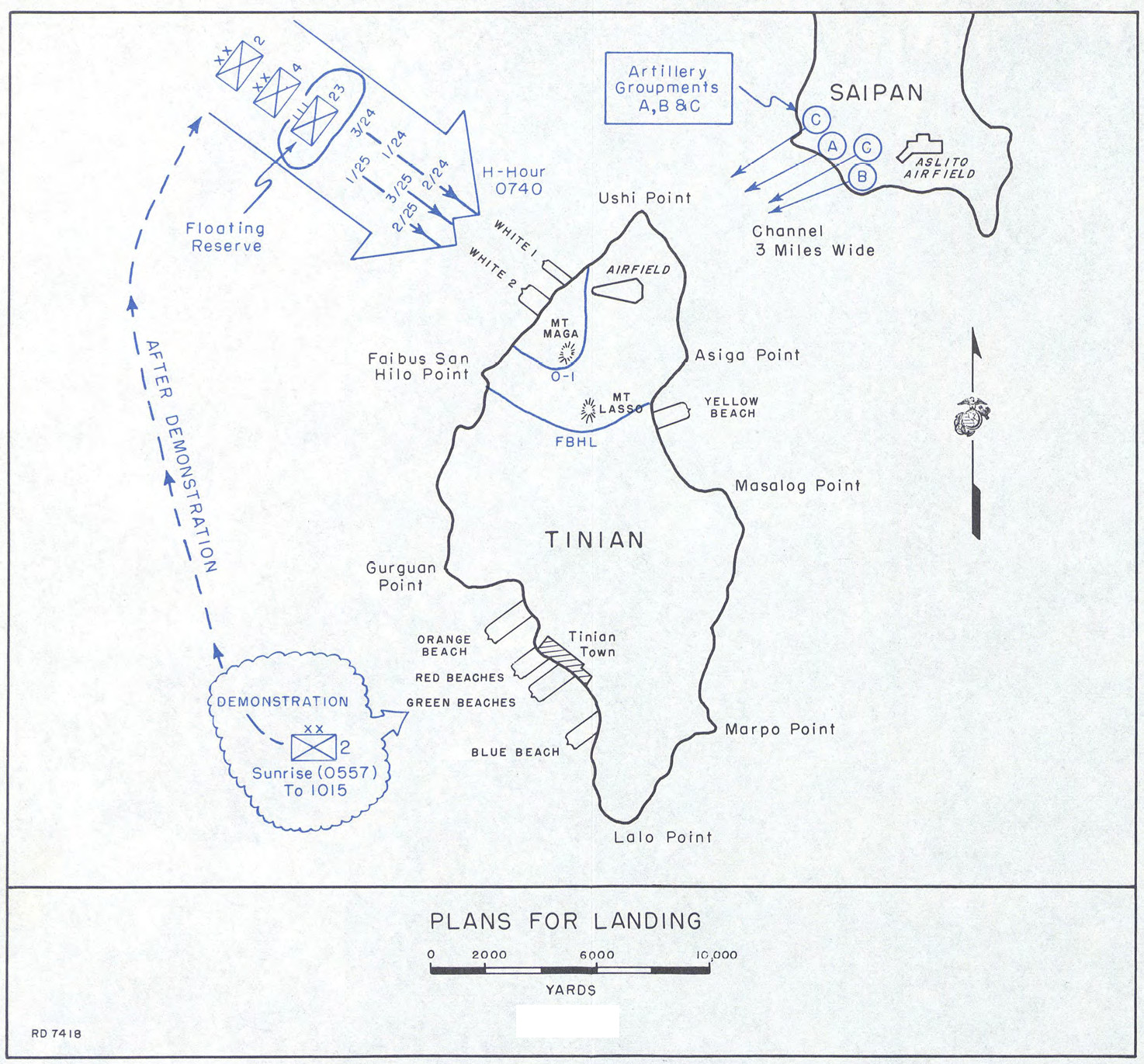
Landing on Tinian

The marines left their packs behind on Saipan and landed with coveralls, M1 helmets with camouflage covers, weapons, emergency rations, a spoon, a spare pair of socks, a poncho and insect repellent. The assault troops were carried ashore in the 415 amphibious tractors (LVTs) of the Marine Corps's 2nd, 5th and 10th Amphibian Tractor Battalions and the Army's 534th, 715th and 773rd Amphibian Tractor Battalions. Fire support was provided by the Company D of the 2nd Armored Amphibian Battalion; only one company could be employed due to the narrowness of the beaches. The shore party for White Beach 1 was provided by the Army's 1341st Engineer Combat Battalion and that of White Beach 2 by the 2nd Battalion, 20th Marines.

Captain Paul J. Halloran, the NTLF Construction Officer, designed a landing ramp that could be carried by an LVT. This creation was named a "Doodlebug". The Doodlebugs allowed vehicles to scale the low cliffs around the White Beaches. The Doodlebug drove up to the cliff face, firmly attached hooks to the cliff tops and then backed away from under the ramps, leaving them in place, with the other end falling into the water. The ramp crews checked that the ramps were firmly anchored and then the Doodlebugs drove over them to the top of the cliffs. The ramps were strong enough to hold the weight of a 35-short-ton (32 t) medium tank. Ten were built, of which six were used in the assault, carried to Tinian by Ashland.

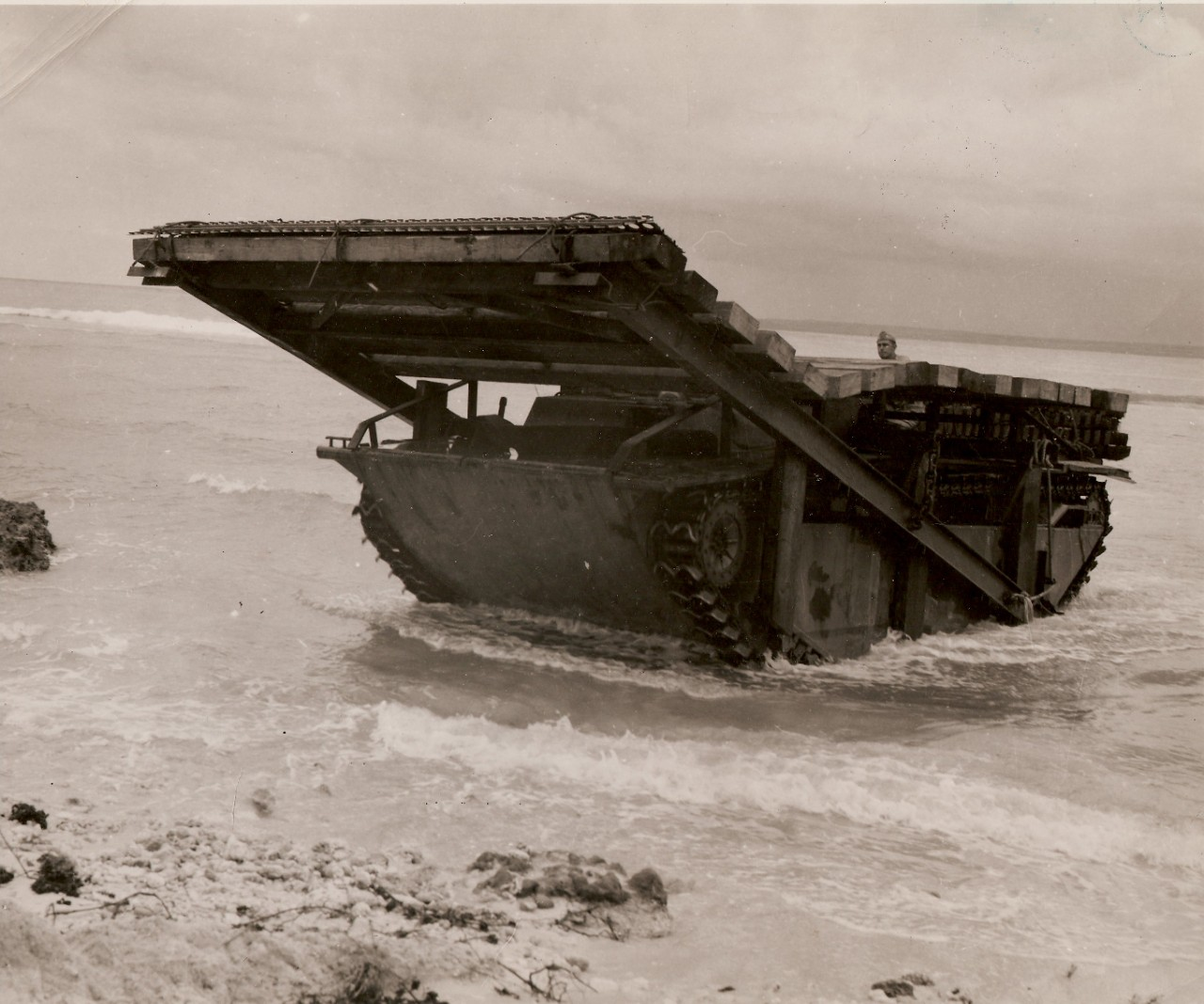
Demonstration of the Doodlebug on Saipan

Cates assigned the 24th Marines to land on White Beach 1 one battalion at a time, starting with the 2nd Battalion, while the 2nd and 3rd Battalions of the 25th Marines landed on White Beach 2. The 23rd Marines was in reserve. The first wave of LVTs, consisting of eight LVTs for White Beach 1 and sixteen for White Beach 2, left the line of departure at 07:17 followed at close intervals by fourteen more waves. Eight LVTs carried a rifle company of about 200 men. No more than four LVTs could beach at the one time on White Beach 1, so the other four nosed up against the 3-to-10-foot (1 to 3 m) coral cliffs and the marines clambered over them. Company E of the 2nd Battalion, 24th Marines, was first ashore there. It was opposed by a small number of Japanese defenders in crevices and a cave, who were eliminated after a brief action, allowing the rest of the 2nd Battalion and the shore party of the 1341st Engineer Battalion to land unopposed.

Two pillboxes guarded White Beach 2, which were bypassed by the first waves, but reduced by later ones; fifty dead Japanese were found inside. Both beaches had mines; none exploded on White Beach 1, where they had been allowed to deteriorate, but the area around White Beach 2 was sown with anti-boat mines on the beach and anti-personnel mines ashore, which the underwater demolition teams (UDTs), bomb disposal teams and engineers took until 13:37 to clear. Three LVTs were disabled by mines when they ventured inland from White Beach 2. The 4th Tank Battalion had trouble negotiating the reefs, potholes and mines on White Beach 2 and was diverted to White Beach 1. Despite its small size, nearly all vehicles were landed over White Beach 1. This included the M3 Stuart light tanks of Company D with Ronson flamethrowers. In the afternoon, Company A came ashore on White Beach 2 without mishap.

All three assault battalions were ashore by 08:20. On White Beach 1 the 2nd Battalion, 24th Marines, was followed by the 1st Battalion, which was ashore by 08:46, and the 3rd Battalion at 09:25. On White Beach 2, the reserve battalion, the 1st Battalion, 25th Marines, was ashore by 09:30. DUKWs carrying the artillery began landing at 13:15, the 23rd Marines at 14:00, and the 2nd Marine Division's 1st Battalion, 8th Marines, at 17:00. The planned beachhead was occupied, and the marines strung barbed wire and established fields of fire in anticipation of a Japanese counterattack. Two pontoon causeway piers were placed during the night, allowing loaded trucks to come ashore from LSTs. By the evening, 15,614 marines, soldiers and sailors had landed on Tinian, at a cost of 15 men killed and 225 wounded.

=== Counterattack ===
Ogata immediately attempted to organized a counterattack, in keeping with Japanese doctrine at the time of repulsing the attack on the beach. The 1st Battalion, 50th Infantry Regiment, was already in the vicinity of the American beachhead, and was able to probe the hastily positioned defenses for weaknesses. The 2nd Battalion in the Asiga Bay area was not far away, but could not move until dark, when American aircraft were not in the sky. Izumi's mobile counterattack force was ordered forward from its assembly position in the Mapo area. He moved along the side of the roads, where trees offered concealment from the air, and was only spotted from the air once. Ogata kept the 3rd Battalion in place at Tinian Town in case the Americans made a follow-up landing there. Naval troops approached the beachhead from the Ushi Point airfield.

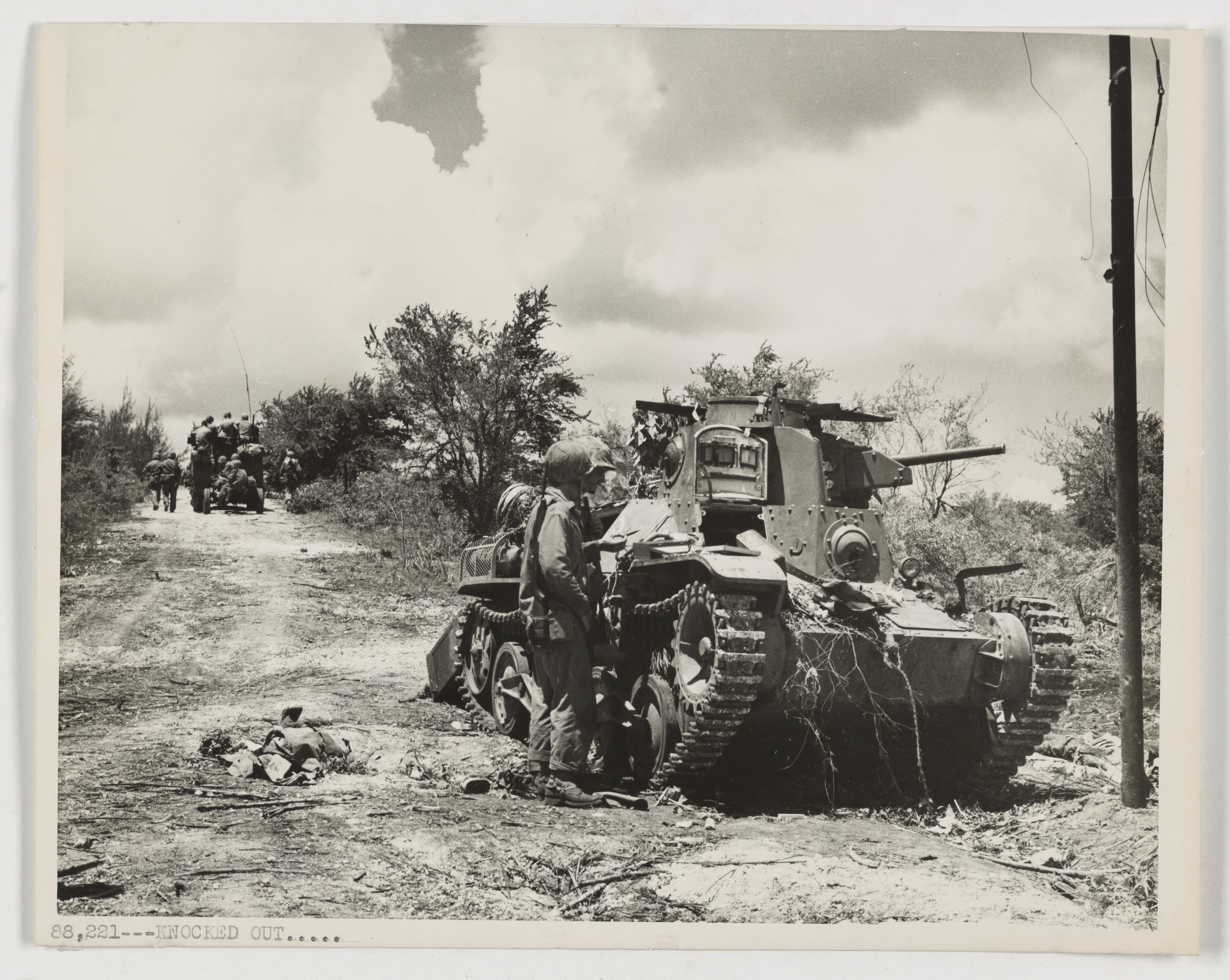
Marines inspect a knocked out Japanese tank

At around 02:00 on 25 July, a force of about 600 Japanese sailors encountered the 1st Battalion, 24th Marines, on the left of the American beachhead, and charged into machine gun, mortar, rifle and 37 mm antitank gun canister shot fire. A furious fight ensued, in which Company A was reduced to just 30 men, but by 07:00 476 Japanese lay dead.

In the center of the American line another attack developed at the boundary between the 24th and 25th Marines. About 200 Japanese soldiers broke through the lines of Company K, 25th Marines, and divided into two groups. One group attacked Battery D, 14th Marines. The attack was halted with the help of Browning .50 caliber machine gun fire from Batteries E and F. Company C of the 8th Marines was sent to their aid, but found the situation in hand. About 100 dead Japanese were found in the area; two men of Battery D were killed. The other group was engaged in a wooded area by 60 mm mortars. The attack in the center cost the Japanese about 500 dead, most of whom were from the 1st Battalion, 135th Infantry Regiment. Many were caught on the barbed wire and killed by machine gun fire.

On the right, the 23rd Marines were attacked by five or six Japanese tanks, accompanied by infantry of the 1st and 2nd Battalions, 50th Infantry Regiment, and the 1st Battalion, 135th Infantry Regiment. The moonless night was lit up by Navy star shells. Five Japanese tanks were knocked out by bazookas, 75 mm halftracks and 37 mm antitank guns. The Japanese infantry charged the lines of the 2nd battalion, 23rd Marines, and 2nd Battalion, 25th Marines. Some broke through their lines, only to encounter the 1st Battalion, 23rd Marines. In the morning, 267 Japanese dead were counted in this sector. In all, the counterattack cost Ogata about 1,200 dead.

=== Drive south ===
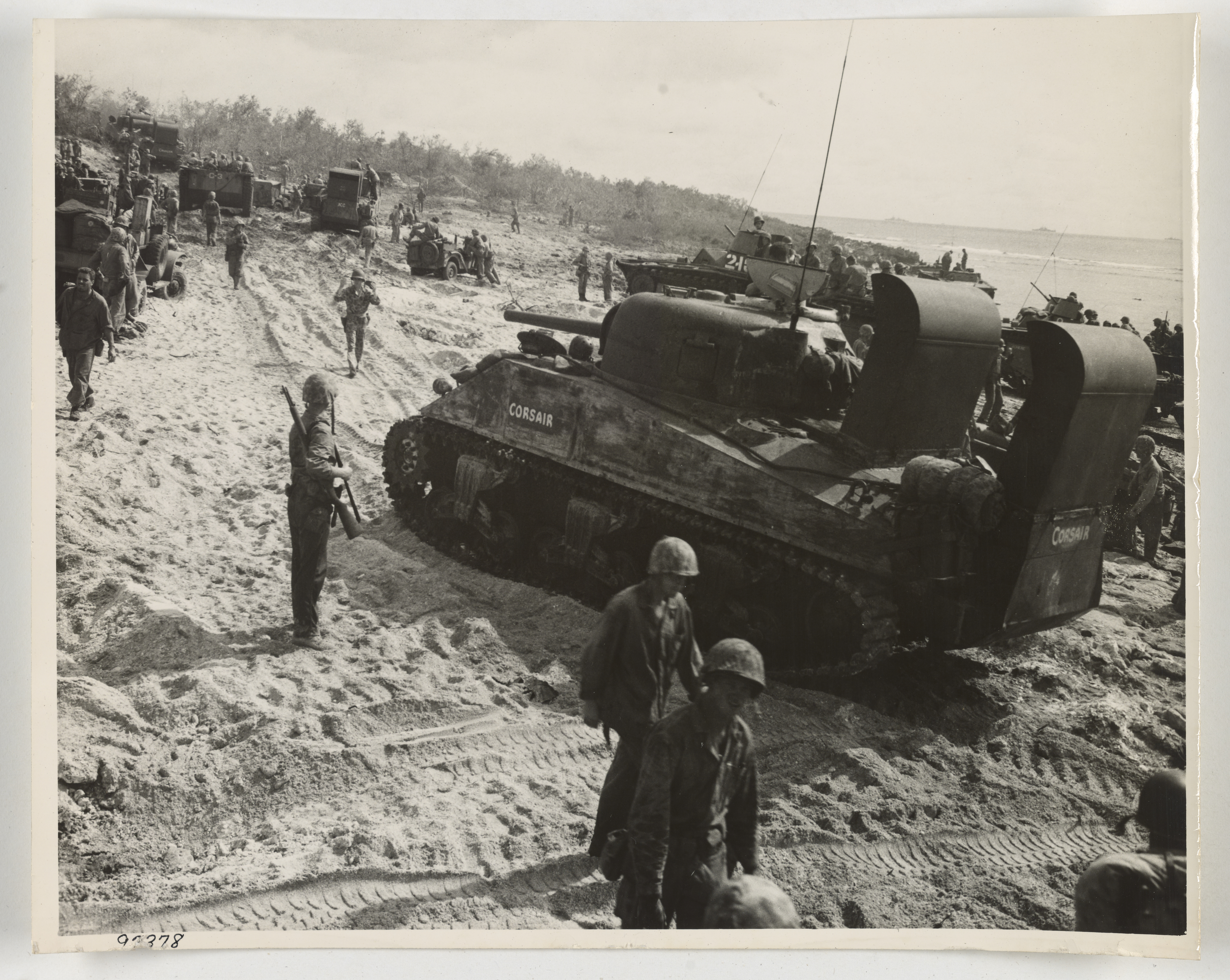
M4 Sherman tanks and other vehicles deploy inland. Extended exhaust stacks allow them to operate in shallow water.

The nighttime actions had depleted the 4th Marine Division's ammunition, so Cates delayed attacking on 25 July until 10:00 to allow time to replenish. In the meantime, the rest of the 2nd Marine Division began landing. As they moved north along the coast through terrain characterized by coral rocks and thick undergrowth, the 1st Battalion, 8th Marines, was held up by a force of 20 to 25 Japanese that it took until 11:30 to overcome. On their right, the 2nd Battalion, 8th Marines, reached the Ushi Point airfield, and the 24th Marines reached airfield No. 3. The 25th Marines was confronted by the most formidable obstacle of the day, Mount Maga, which was captured with a double envelopment.

The following day, the 25th Marines captured the steeper and more imposing Mount Lasso without opposition, as the Japanese had pulled out during the night. The advance had now begun to outrun the range of the artillery on Saipan, so the 105 mm howitzer battalions of the 10th and 14th Marines displaced to Tinian on 26 and 27 July and rejoined their divisions. The marines pressed forward on 27 and 28 July against sporadic Japanese resistance.

=== Weather breaks ===
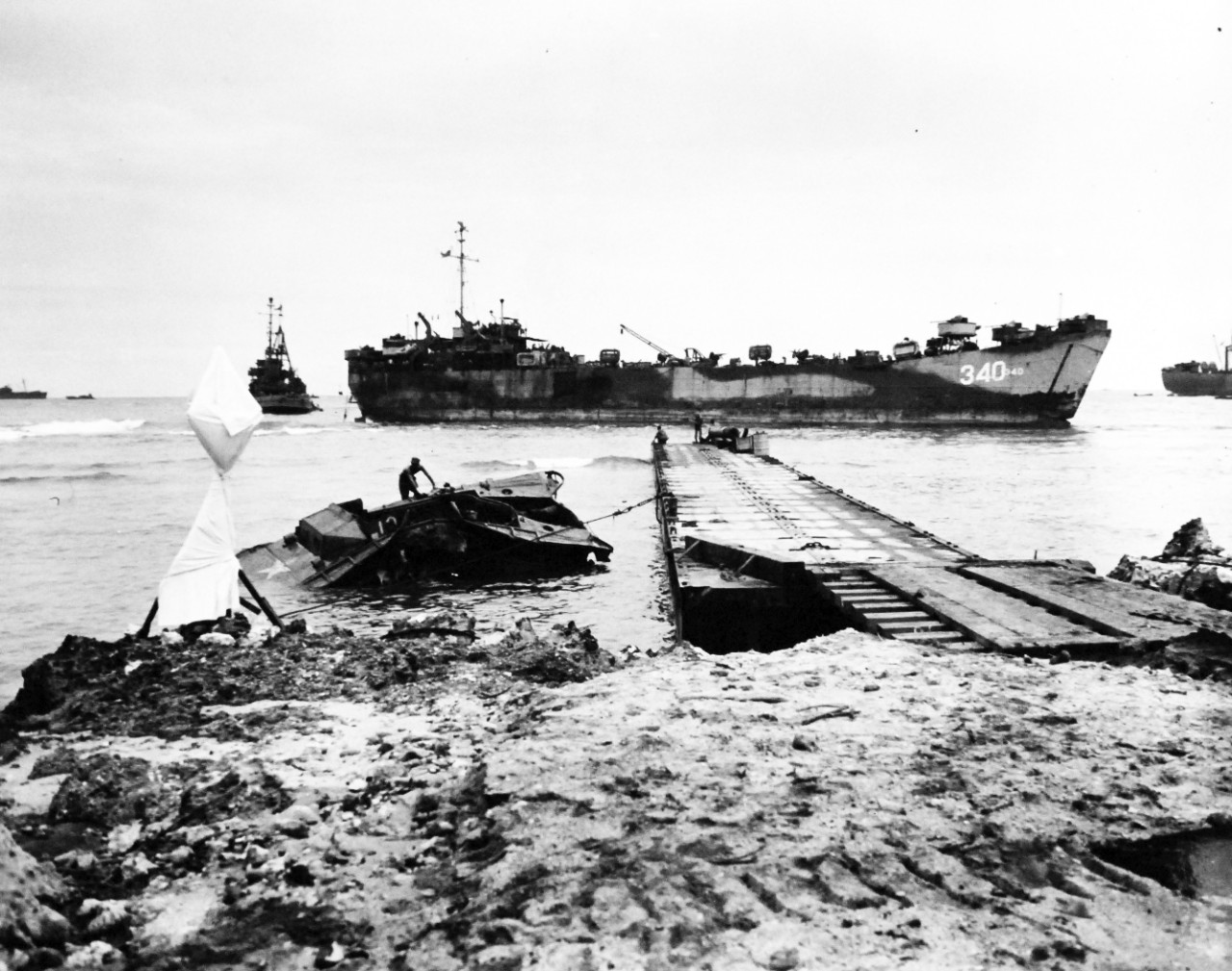
USS LST-340 at the pontoon pier on White Beach 2

The weather abruptly worsened on the afternoon of 28 July. A typhoon in the Philippine Sea caused heavy swells. At 18:00 all unloading ceased. USS LST-340 ran aground on the reef, and efforts to refloat her were unsuccessful. On 13 August, she was pulled off the reef and towed to Tanapag Harbor, where she was beached. A control craft, LCC-25473, was washed up on the reef at White Beach 1, but was salvaged the following day. The pontoon causeways were damaged on the night of 29 July. The one at White Beach 1 broached and the one at White Beach 2 broke in two. The White Beach 1 causeway was restored to service on 31 July, only to broach again.

With the Ushi Point airfield in American hands, the 121st Naval Construction Battalion commenced its repair on 27 July, filling in the bomb and shell craters. By that evening, an airstrip 2,500 feet (760 m) long and 150 feet (46 m) wide was ready for use, and it was fully restored to its 4,700-foot (1,400 m) length the next day. On 29 July, a P-47 landed and took off again. Hill summoned the 9th Troop Carrier Squadron from Eniwetok and its Douglas C-47 Skytrains, together with the Curtiss C-46 Commandos of VMR-252, delivered 33,000 rations from Saipan on 31 July. On the return trip they carried wounded. A parachute drop of 30 short tons (27 t) of supplies was prepared, but was not necessary.

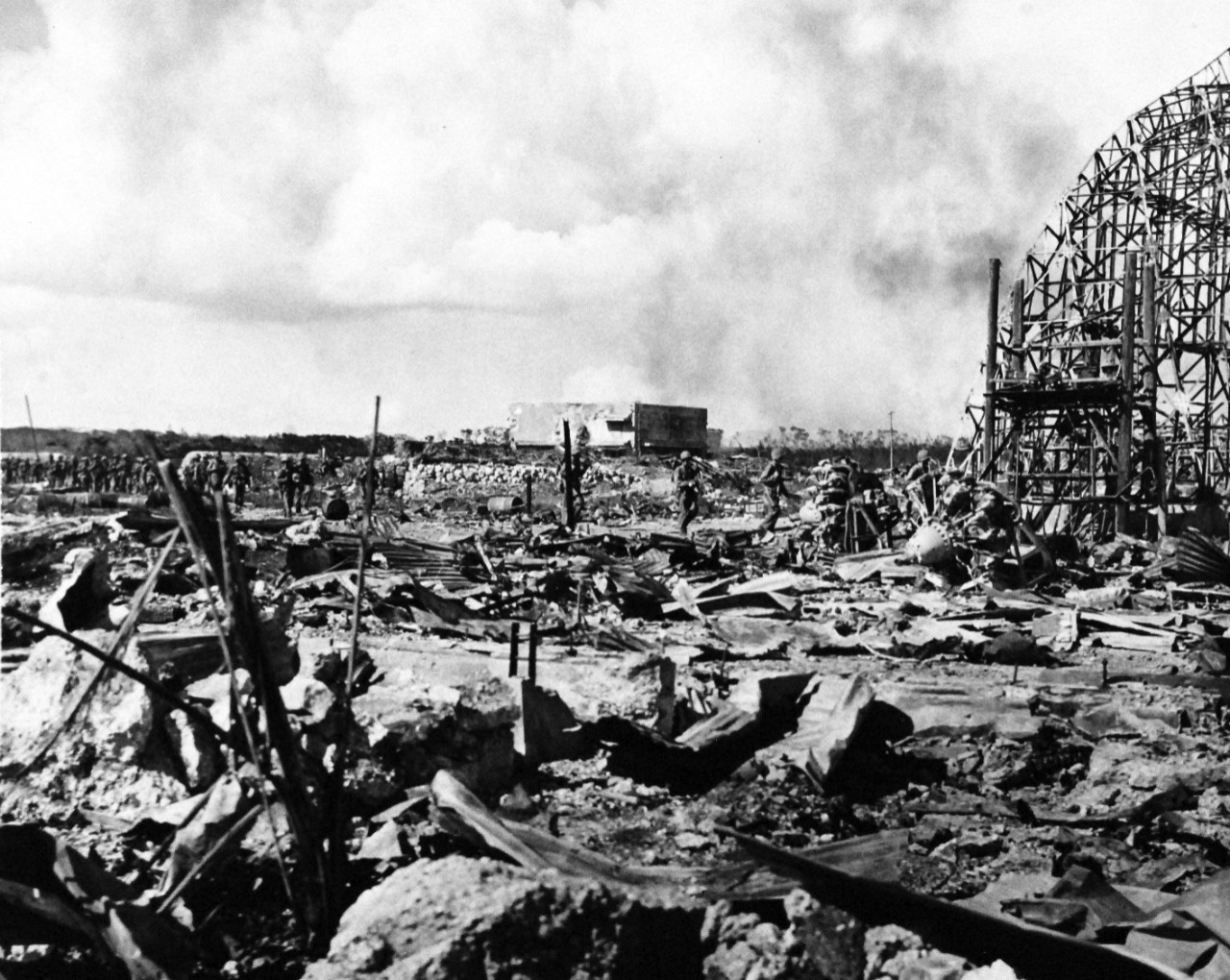
Marines move across the wreckage of the Japanese airfield at Ushi Point

The rough seas precluded unloading to all but DUKWs. These were the preferred transport for supplies, as they did not damage the roads like the LVTs did. In some places engineers constructed parallel roads for LVTs. One important task for the DUKWs was hauling ammunition from the ammunition ships SS Rockland Victory, which arrived off Tinian on 26 July, and MS Sea Witch, which arrived the following day. The DUKWs also had to haul 600 to 800 drums of fuel each day from the floating barges. A gasoline shortage was averted by the capture of Japanese stocks.

On 30 July the 24th Marines occupied Tinian Town and the 25th Marines overran airfield no. 4. The land mines were cleared away, and LCTs began landing on Green Beach. The water off the south pier was not deep enough to allow LSTs to dock there, so pontoon causeways were brought from White Beach 1 and Saipan, allowing the first LST to dock on 4 August. The beach between the two piers was cleared of land mines by 5 August, and was resurfaced with coral, allowing up to fifteen LCMs to beach there simultaneously. The harbor had not been mined, but there were sunken wrecks, which the UDTs demolished.

=== Tinian taken ===
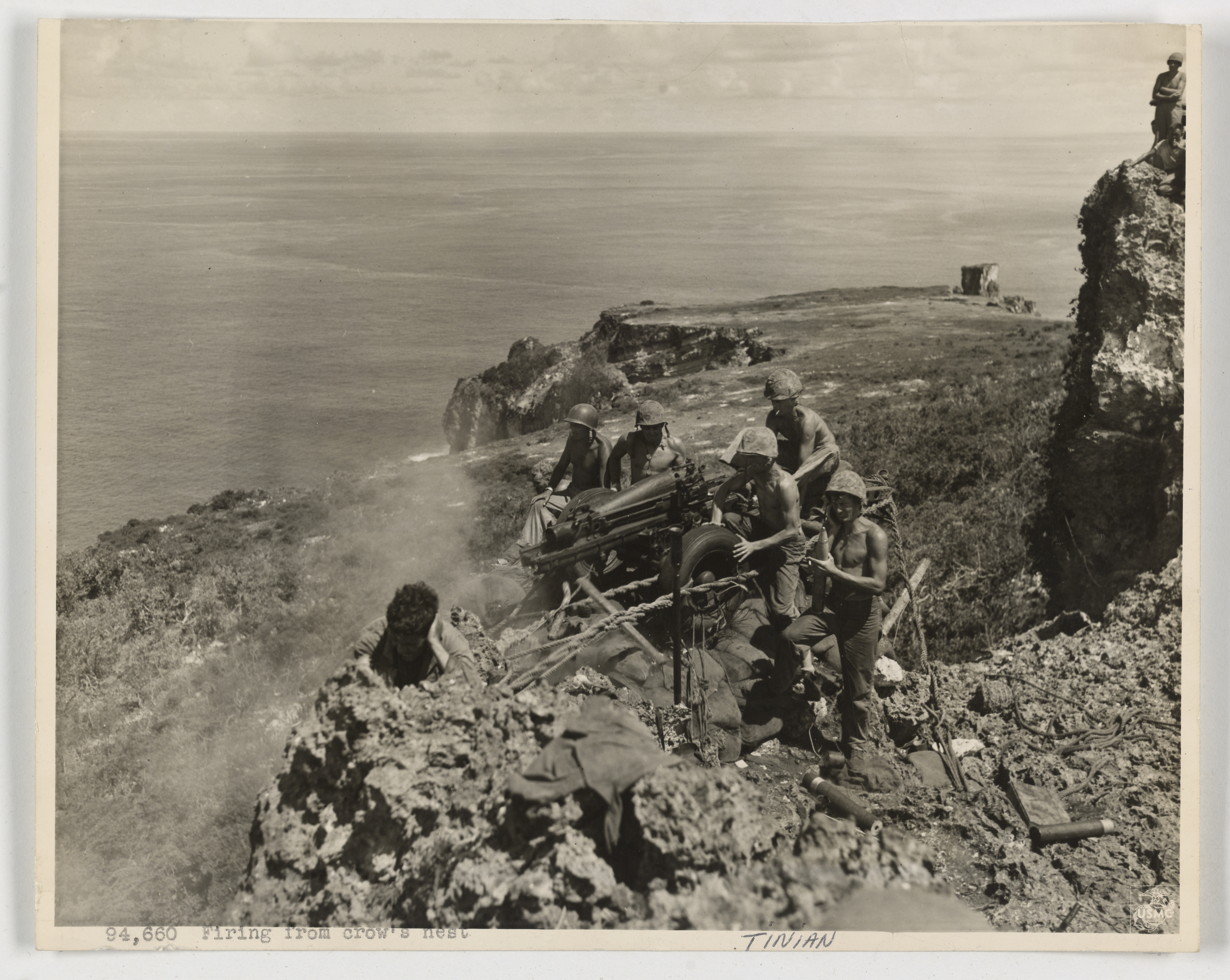
A 75mm pack howitzer, nicknamed "Miss Connie", is fired into a Japanese-held cave on Tinian. The gun was locked securely in this unusual position after the parts were hand-carried to the cliff's edge.

Japanese remnants made a final stand in the caves and ravines of a limestone ridge on the south portion of the island, where the terrain rose in a brush and rock strewn plateau 5,000 yards (4,600 m) long and 2,000 yards (1,800 m) wide. On the evening of 30 July, Schmidt ordered his divisions to occupy the coastline between Lalo and Mapo Points, and annihilate the remaining Japanese forces. The next morning, the battleships Tennessee and California and the cruisers Louisville, Montpelier and Birmingham unleashed 615 short tons (558 t) of shells on the plateau, and aircraft dropped 69 short tons (63 t) of bombs. As they advanced, the marines encountered civilians waving white cloths, who had to be approached with care, as sometimes one of their number turned out to be a Japanese soldier intent on suicide and taking some Americans with him. Kakuta sent his last radio message to Tokyo that day. It is not known whether he was killed in action or committed suicide; neither his body nor that of Oie was ever found. Another source states Oie committed suicide.

The rugged terrain hampered the tanks but the flamethrower tanks of Company D, 4th Tank Battalion, were adept at burning sections of undergrowth where Japanese soldiers tried to hide. As the 23rd Marines approached the plateau, they came under intense small arms fire from a small village and the cliff face. The accompanying tanks of Company C, 4th Tank Battalion, were engaged by a concealed Japanese 47 mm antitank gun, which scored six hits on one tank. Although penetrated, the tank remained operational and was able to back away. It used smoke to mark the suspected location of the gun for rockets and naval and tank gunfire. The advance resumed, only to have another tank hit by the same gun. Although also penetrated, it too remained operational, and this time the target was spotted, and engaged by tanks that destroyed the gun and machine-gunned twenty Japanese crewmen who tried to escape.

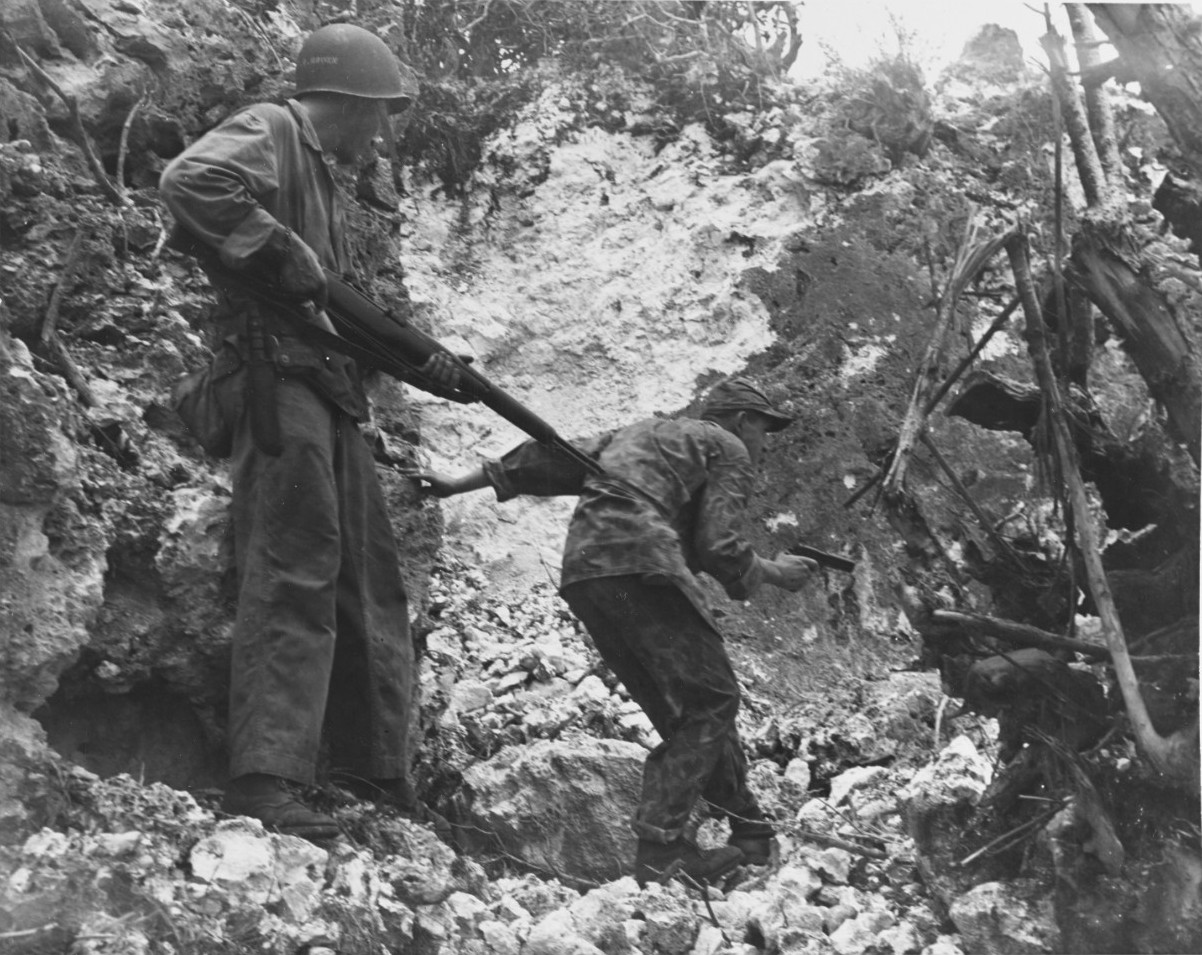
Marines cautiously probe a cave on 28 July

Meanwhile, the 8th Marines made their way onto the plateau, where vegetation covered caves and fissures where Japanese riflemen and machine gunners lurked. While the vegetation concealed them from observation by the Americans, it also restricted their own fields of view. There was one winding road to the top, but it was mined. Engineers removed the mines, allowing tanks to proceed up the road and destroy Japanese positions, while the accompanying infantry battled their way through the brush. At 16:50, Company A reached the top. Five minutes later they were joined by a platoon from Company C. Company E, following up the road, was attacked by between 75 and 100 Japanese, who were eventually repelled. It then made its way to the top. Company G followed, reaching the top at 18:45, which was sunset. During the night, the Japanese attempted to cut off the Americans on the summit. They captured some vehicles, but were unsuccessful. At 05:15 the marines' positions were attacked by more than 600 Japanese soldiers and sailors. An hour later, the 8th Marines had 74 casualties and 200 Japanese were dead. The rest withdrew to the woods and cliffs in the southwest of the island.

Lolo Point, the southernmost tip of the island, was reached at 18:00 on 1 August, and 55 minutes later, Schmidt declared that organized resistance had ended, and the island was secure. Nonetheless, that night, the 6th Marines were attacked by a poorly coordinated force of about 150 Japanese soldiers and sailors. According to Japanese prisoners, Ogata had burned the regimental colors and gathered as many men as he could for a counterattack. The following morning 124 Japanese dead were counted, many of whom had died by their own hand, but Ogata's body was never identified. Some sources state Ogata committed suicide.

=== Casualties ===
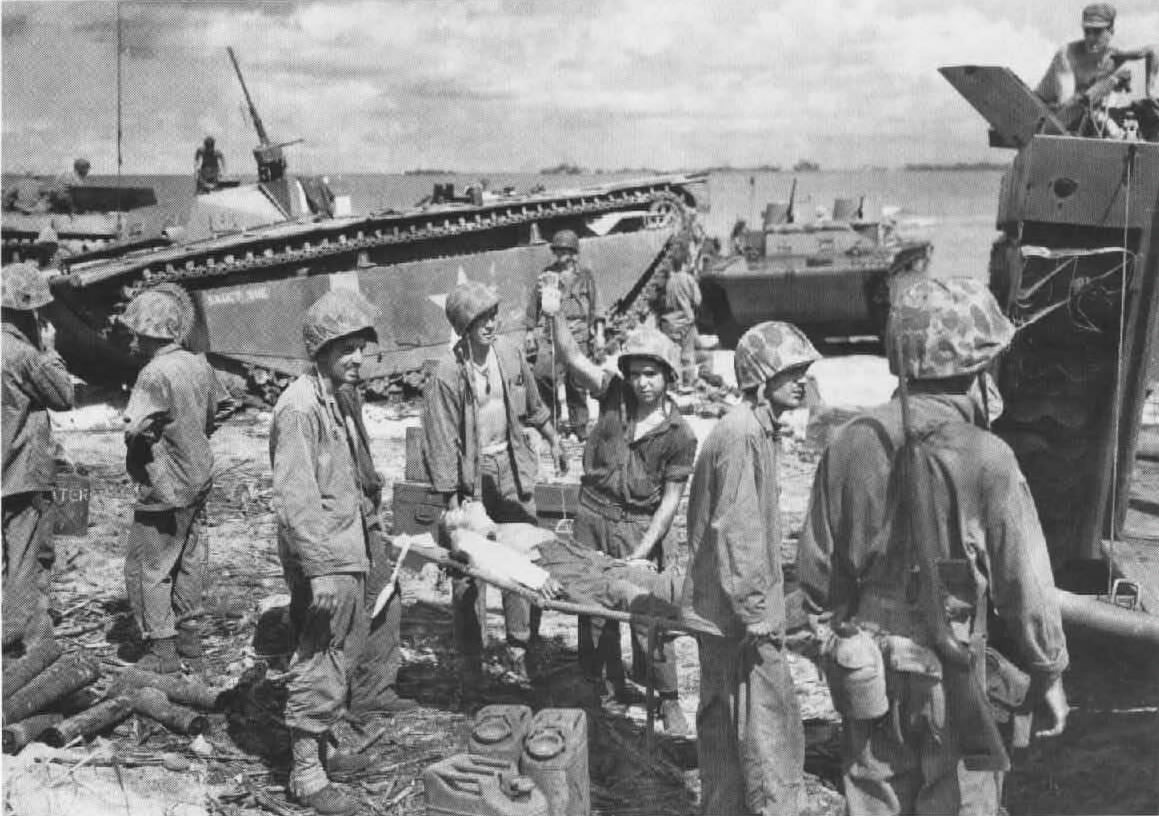
As a Navy corpsman administers a bottle of plasma to a wounded Marine, the stretcher bearers wait patiently to carry him on board a landing craft which will evacuate him to a hospital ship offshore, where he will be given full treatment.

In his report on the Tinian operation, Turner reported the 2nd Marine Division's losses in the period from 24 July to 9 August as 104 killed, 654 wounded and 3 missing, a total of 761. The 4th Marine Division lost 182 killed, 844 wounded and 20 missing, a total of 1,046. Four men of the XXIV Corps Artillery were wounded, and there were 4 killed, 13 wounded and 1 missing among the V Amphibious Corps troops, for a total of 290 killed, 1,515 wounded and 24 missing, giving a grand total of 1,829 casualties. Another 63 sailors and marines were killed and 177 wounded aboard ships. The dead included two men who were posthumously awarded the Medal of Honor for using their bodies to protect their comrades from hand grenades: Private Joseph W. Ozbourn and Private First Class Robert L. Wilson.

By 10 August, Japanese casualties included 404 taken prisoner and 5,745 dead that were buried by the Americans.

=== Analysis ===
Smith considered Tinian "the perfect amphibious operation in the Pacific war." It differed from most in that the proximity of Saipan allowed it to be carried out as a shore-to-shore operation rather than a ship-to-shore one, and fire support was available from land-based artillery. The operation was much less difficult than Saipan; the nearest American base was just 5 miles (8.0 km) away, not over a thousand; the Japanese garrison was smaller; the ratio of attackers to defenders was greater; the terrain was less formidable; intelligence was more accurate; and the preliminary naval and aerial bombardment more protracted. With a superiority in troop numbers of nearly 5:1, the American forces effected a kill ratio of more than 20:1, considerably better than Tarawa, Kwajalein or Saipan.

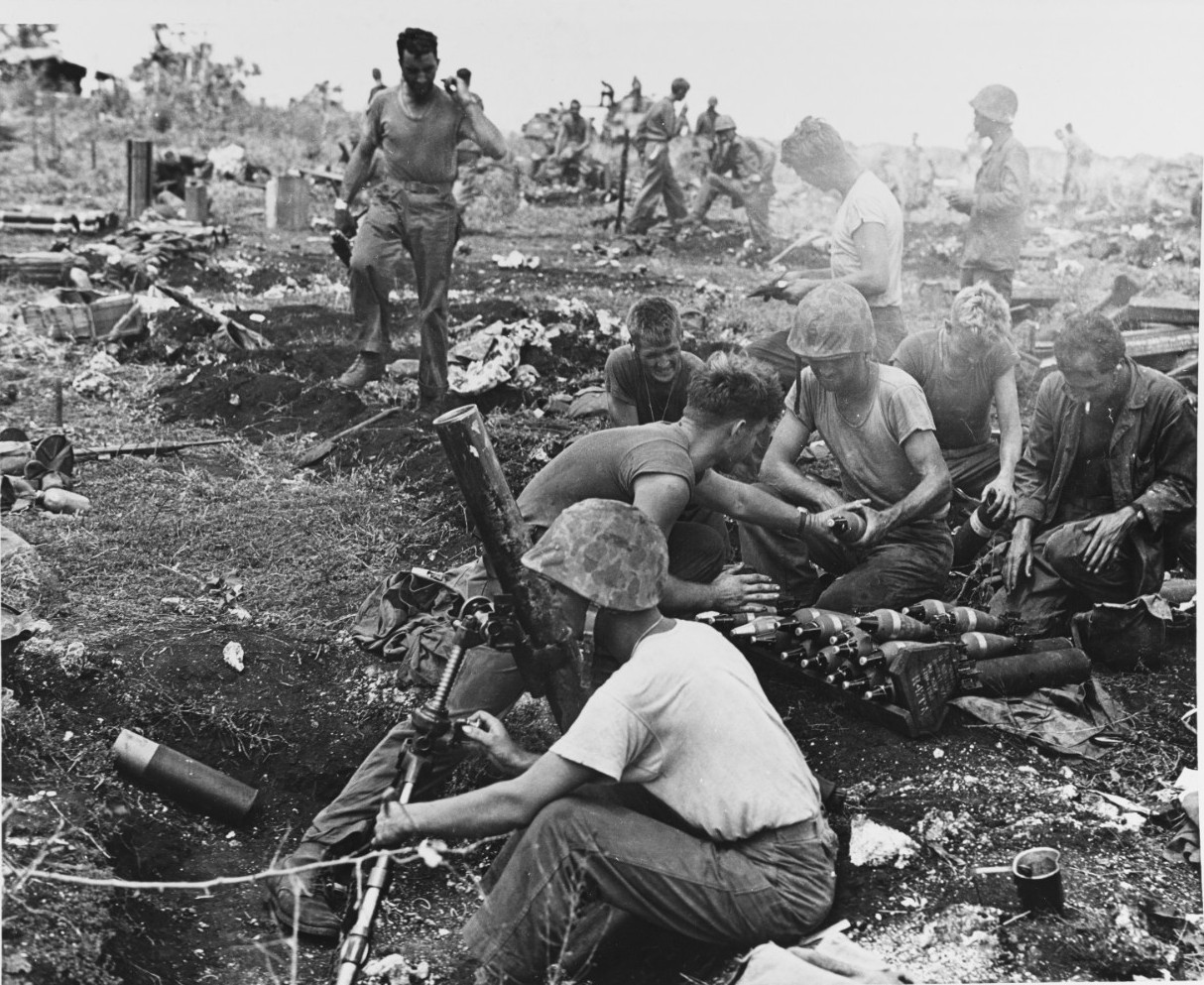
Marines stack mortar rounds in preparation for firing a fast barrage on 30 July

The Battle of Tinian offered a rare example of a force that expected to be attacked still being taken by surprise. "Our singular success at Tinian", Smith later wrote, "lay in the boldness of the landing." The Americans had accurate intelligence, assembled from multiple sources, and knew that the Japanese would not be waiting for them on the White Beaches. Aerial photography of Saipan was restricted through fear that the Japanese would be alerted and the element of surprise would be lost; whereas aerial photography of Tinian was unrestricted but surprise was not sacrificed. American commanders gambled on good weather, but when the weather eventually broke, the American logistical system still held. DUKWs were still able to operate when landing craft could not, and Hill recommended that DUKWs replace LCVPs on the Navy's attack cargo ships. Additional supply capability was available by air, although it was not needed.

For their part, the surprised Japanese defenders made the further mistake by following standard doctrine and fell into the trap set by the recently landed American attackers. Believing that this was the only way to eject the Americans, the Japanese incurred high casualties by assembling in the open to conduct fruitless counterattacks to retake the landing beach, all of which were anticipated by the Americans who were well prepared and could bring their superior firepower to bear. The Japanese defenders had managed to move undetected at night, and were able to withdraw from contact with little loss whenever they wished to do so. Heavier American casualties might have been inflicted by a passive defense, taking advantage of Japanese skill with camouflage, use of terrain, and emplacement of weapons, but this was not Japanese doctrine at the time.

== Aftermath ==
=== Mopping up ===
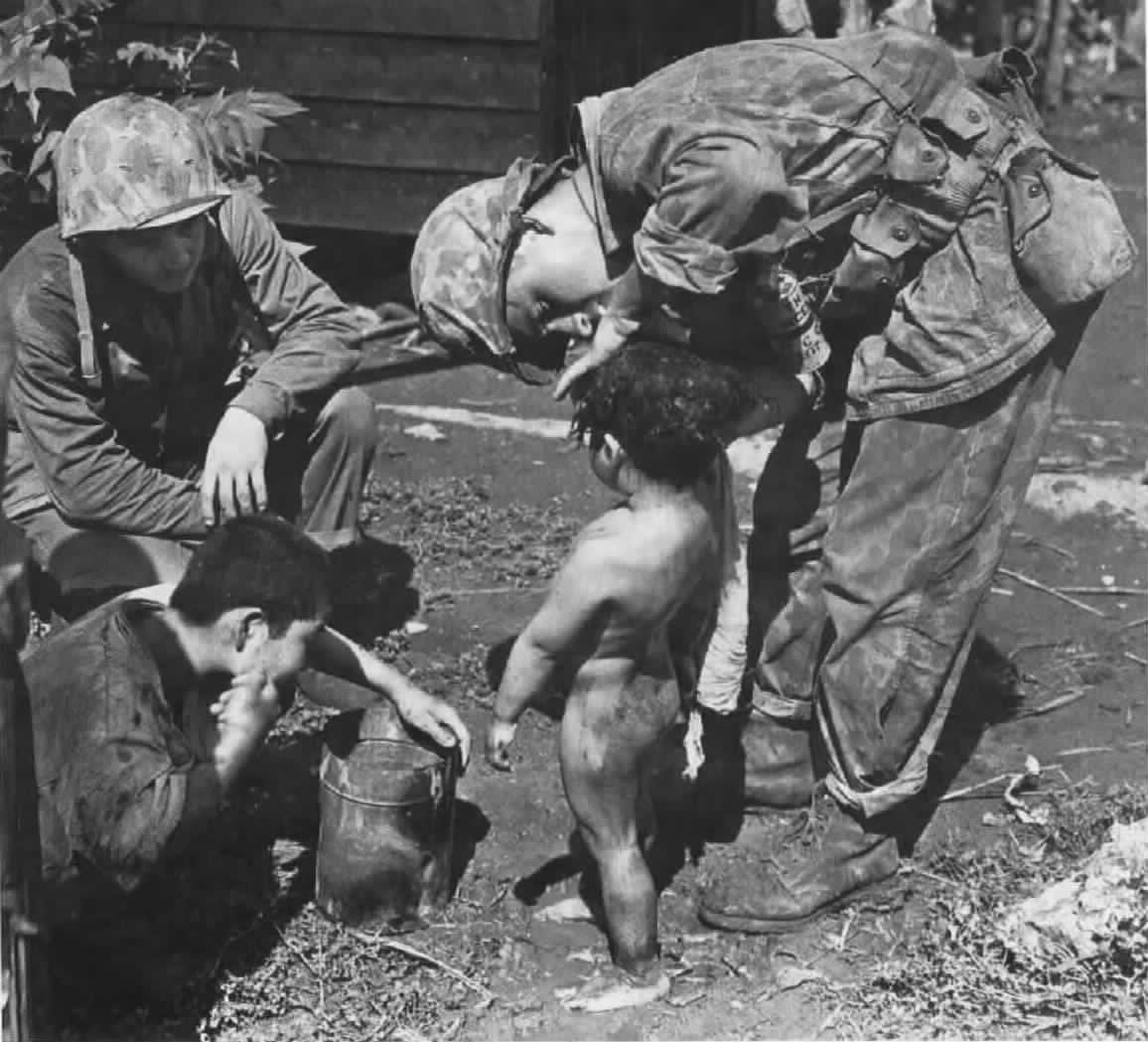
Marines bathe a Tinian girl after she and her family had been removed from a hillside dugout.

On 6 August, Brigadier General Merritt A. Edson, the deputy commander of the 2nd Marine Division, assumed tactical responsibility as commander of Ground Forces Tinian. The 8th Marines assumed responsibility for the whole 2nd Marine Division's sector two days later, allowing the rest of the division to return to Saipan for rest and reorganization. On 10 August it took over the 4th Marine Division's sector as well, so it could return to Hawaii. Major General James L. Underhill was appointed Island Commander on 1 August 1944. Nine days later, all forces on Tinian were transferred to his command. He was succeeded by Brigadier General Frederick V. H. Kimble on 28 November.

The 8th Marines patrolled the island, mopping up Japanese holdouts. On 25 October, the 8th Marines joined the rest of the 2nd Marine Division on Saipan, leaving the 1st Battalion behind on Tinian. It continued mopping up patrols until 1 January 1945, when it too departed for Saipan. Between 1 August 1944 and 1 January 1945, the 8th Marines lost another 38 killed and 125 wounded; 542 Japanese soldiers were killed. Responsibility for the defence of Tinian was handed over to the Marines of the 16th Antiaircraft Artillery Battalion. It departed for Okinawa in April 1945, but the 17th and 18th Antiaircraft Artillery Battalions remained to defend the airbases.

The garrison on Aguijan Island off the southwest cape of Tinian, commanded by Second Lieutenant Kinichi Yamada, held out until the end of the war, surrendering to Rear Admiral Marshall R. Greer on the United States Coast Guard Cutter USCG 83525 on 4 September 1945. The entire garrison of 67 troops, along with 172 Japanese and 128 Korean civilians, were interned on Tinian. The last holdout on Tinian, Murata Susumu, was captured in 1953 and repatriated to Japan.

=== Military government ===
There were 16,029 civilians on Tinian on 15 April 1944, of whom 1,658, mostly women, children and the elderly, were evacuated to Japan before the American invasion. An estimated 2,610 civilians died in the battle. Journalist Robert Sherrod noted that most died as a result of the fighting; the Americans made great use of artillery, aerial and naval bombardment, and civilians often sheltered with soldiers. Some died from disease, dehydration or malnutrition. Some were murdered by Japanese soldiers. In one instance Japanese soldiers tied 40 to 50 civilians together and threw a grenade at them. There were instances of mass suicide, most notably by jumping off the 120-foot (37 m) "Suicide Cliff" between Mapo and Lalo Points. Children were thrown off the cliff by their parents, and some civilians were pushed off the cliff by Japanese soldiers. A captured Japanese soldier claimed that a thousand loyal citizens had allowed the military to blow them up in caves.

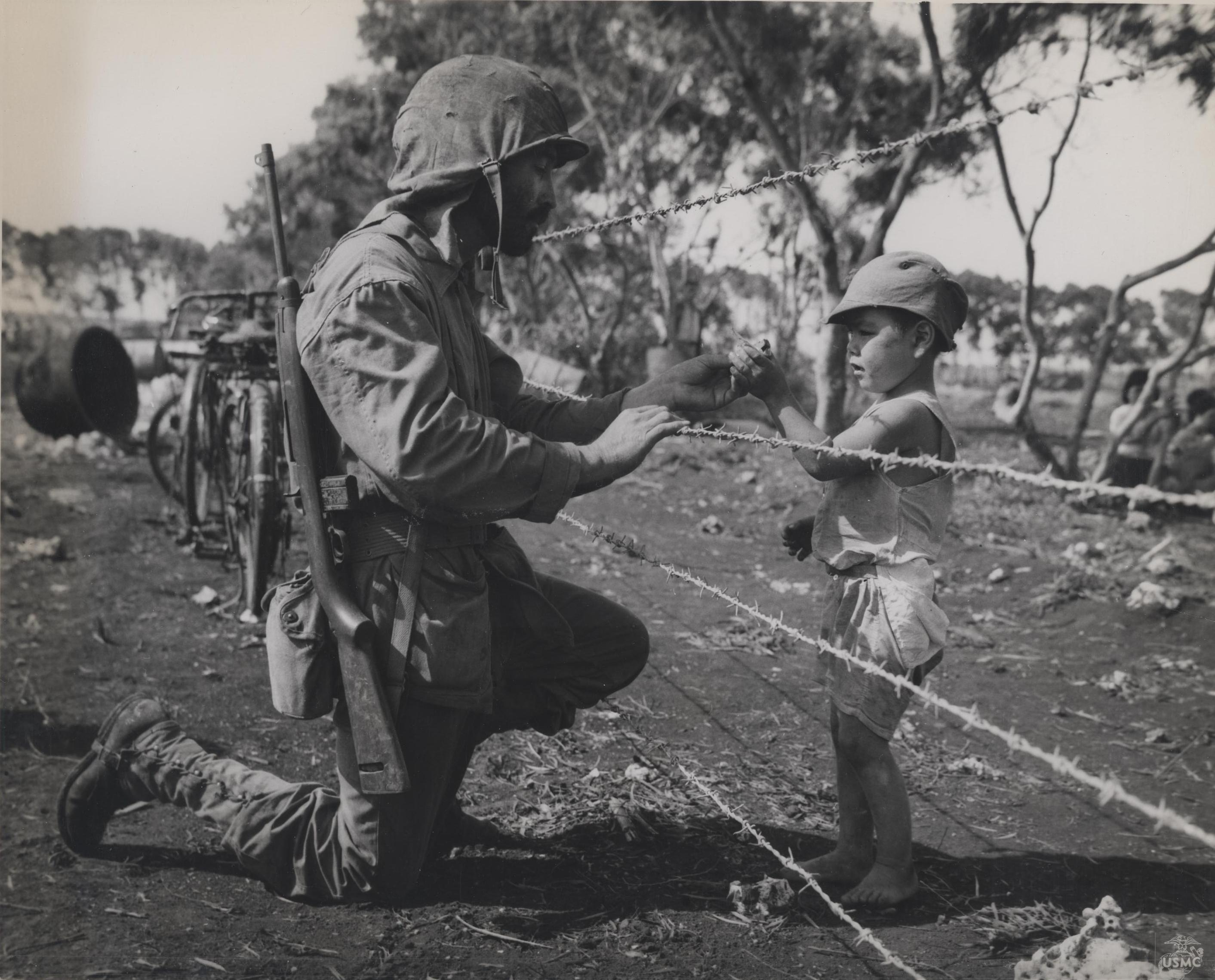
Staff Sergeant Frederico Claveria gives candy to an interned child.

Only 2,468 civilians had been accounted for by 1 August, but within three days that number had increased to 8,491. The 2nd Marine Division established a stockade for civilians at the Ushi Point Airfield while the 4th Marine Division established one on the site of the ruined village of Churo. The latter was chosen as a permanent camp site, and all the civilians were subsequently concentrated there. By 15 October, there were 10,926 civilians at Camp Churo, of whom 8,625 were Japanese, 2,297 were Koreans, and 4 were Chinese. Nearly half were children under the age of 15.

The military government was unprepared to care for the large number of civilians, and there were critical shortages of relief supplies of all kinds. Seabees supervised the erection of tarpaulin shelters. These were gradually replaced by huts made from corrugated iron and timber salvaged from around the island. The internees also salvaged food supplies, and cultivated gardens. When firewood started to become scarce, Seabees made them improvised diesel stoves.

In late 1945, Spruance, who had succeeded Nimitz as CINCPOA, ordered the repatriation of all Japanese and Korean civilians. This was completed by late 1946.

=== Base development ===
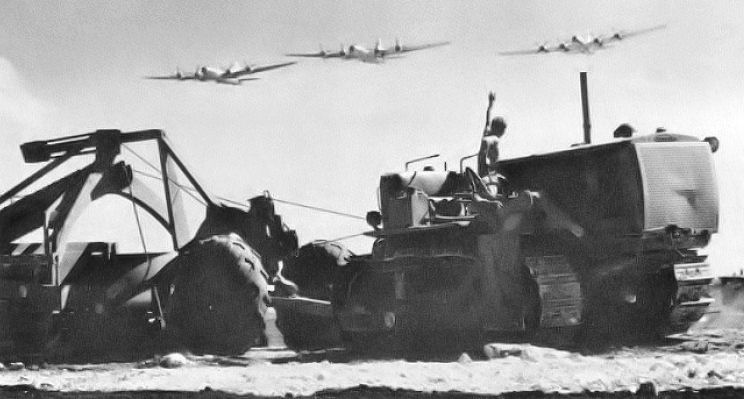
A Seabee waves at incoming Boeing B-29 Superfortress bombers

Responsibility for the transformation of Tinian into a base for B-29 bombers was assigned to the 6th Naval Construction Brigade, under Halloran's command. For this work his brigade had the 29th and 30th Naval Construction Regiments; a third regiment, the 49th Naval Construction Regiment, arrived in March 1945. Two air bases were constructed, North Field and West Field. These were on the site of the existing Japanese fields at Ushi Point and Gurguan Point respectively, but they had to be lengthened to 8,500 feet (2,600 m) and widened to 500 feet (150 m) to handle the B-29s. This task would have been easier if the plateau had been more than 7,000 feet (2,100 m) wide. As it was, large amounts of fill were required.

When work was completed on 5 May 1945, North Field had four parallel 8,500-foot (2,600 m) runways, with 8 miles (13 km) of taxiways, 265 hardstands, 173 Quonset huts and 92 other buildings. Its construction involved 2,109,800 cubic yards (1,613,100 m^{3}) of excavations and 4,789,400 cubic yards (3,661,800 m^{3}) of fill. West Field had two B-29 runways, 53,000 feet (16,000 m) of taxiways, 220 hardstands and 251 administration, maintenance and repair buildings. The adjacent base for naval aircraft had 16,000 feet (4,900 m) of taxiways, 70 hardstands, 345 Quonset huts, 33 administration, maintenance and repair buildings, and a 75-foot (23 m) tall control tower.

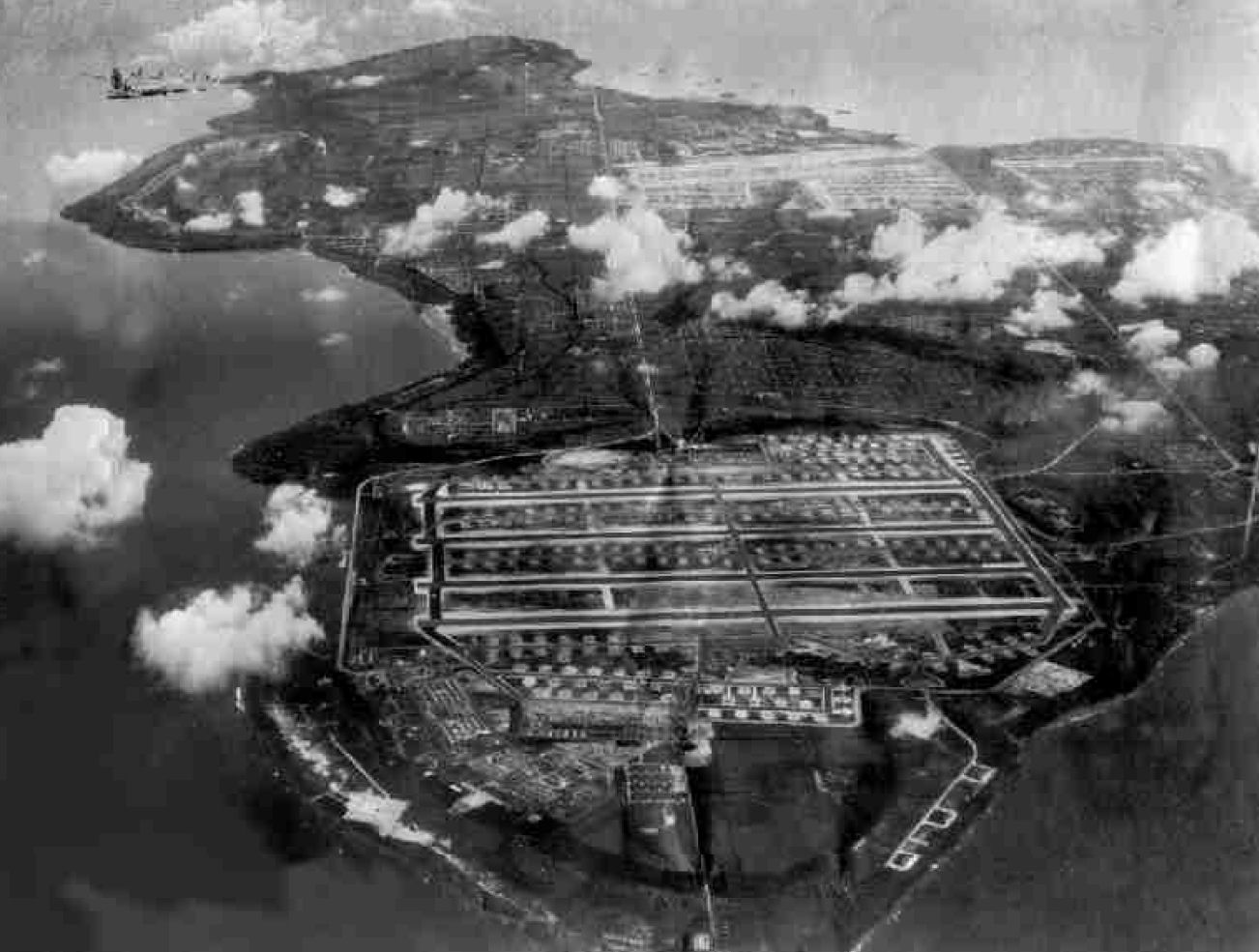
Tinian in 1945 after airbase construction was complete. North Field is in the foreground and West Field in the background.

Initially, fuel had to be supplied in drums. Later, aviation gasoline was drawn from a barge anchored in Tinian Harbor. The fuel storage and distribution system was completed by 8 March 1945. This included storage tanks for 14,000 US barrels (1,700,000 L) of diesel oil, 20,000 US barrels (2,400,000 L) of motor gasoline and 165,000 US barrels (19,700,000 L) of aviation gasoline. Fuel was pumped over a submarine pipeline from an oil tanker moored north of Tinian Harbor and distributed over 86,000 feet (26,000 m) of pipeline. Work on the harbor included dredging operations and the construction of a breakwater and quays for Liberty ships. Until it was completed in March 1945, cargo was brought ashore by LCMs and LCTs.

North Field became operational in February 1945 and West Field the following month. The 313th Bombardment Wing arrived from the United States in December 1944 and was based at North Field. The 58th Bombardment Wing arrived from the China-Burma-India Theater in March 1945 and was based at West Field. A third formation, the 509th Composite Group arrived in May 1945 and moved to North Field, where it took over an area that had been specially constructed for it. Thus, two of the five bombardment wings of the Twentieth Air Force were based on Tinian. These formations participated in the campaign of air raids on Japan, including the bombing of Tokyo on 10 March 1945, and the atomic bombings of Hiroshima and Nagasaki on 6 and 9 August 1945.
