= Thomas E. Watson (USMC) =

United States Marine Corps general

Thomas Eugene Watson
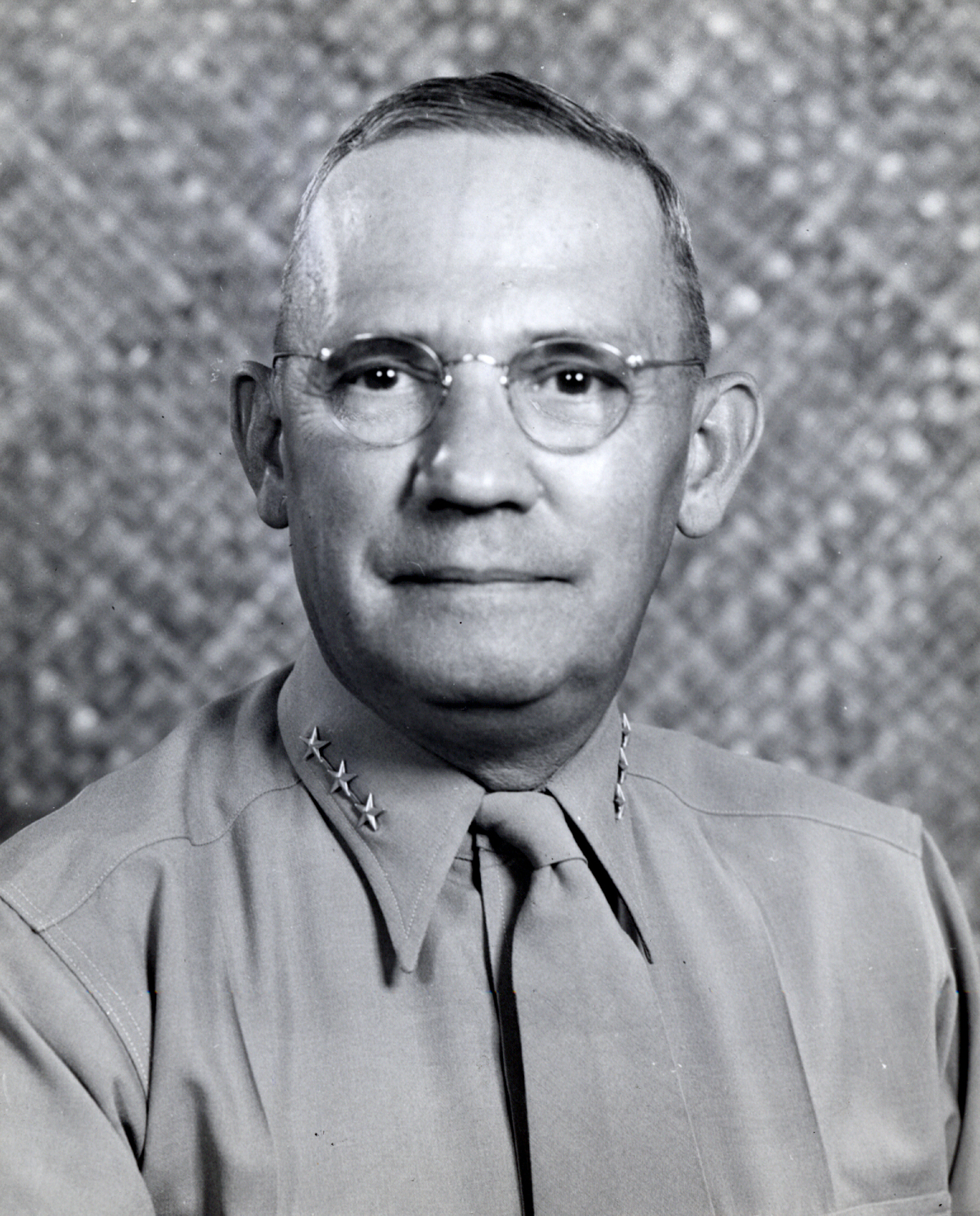
- LtGen Thomas E. Watson
- Born: January 18, 1892; Oskaloosa, Iowa, U.S.
- Died: March 6, 1966 (aged 74); Panama Canal Zone
- Military career
- Allegiance: United States of America
- Branch: United States Marine Corps
- Service years: 1912–1950
- Rank: Lieutenant general
- Nickname: "Terrible Tommy"
- Commands: 2nd Battalion 6th Marines; 3rd Marine Brigade; 2nd Marine Division; Fleet Marine Force, Pacific
- Conflicts: Banana Wars; Dominican intervention; World War I; Chinese Civil War; World War II; Gilbert and Marshall Islands campaign; Battle of Kwajalein; Battle of Eniwetok; Marianas campaign; Battle of Saipan; Battle of Tinian; Battle of Okinawa
- Awards: Navy Distinguished Service Medal (2)

Thomas Eugene Watson (January 18, 1892 – March 6, 1966) was a United States Marine Corps General who served in the Marine Corps from 1912 to 1950. His last command (January 1, 1948 – July 1, 1950) was as commanding general, Fleet Marine Force, Pacific. Previously, he had commanded the Second Marine Division at Camp Lejeune, North Carolina, and was commanding officer of the famed Second Division in the battle for Saipan and Tinian during World War II. For outstanding services in this capacity, he was awarded a Gold Star in lieu of a second Navy Distinguished Service Medal.

== Biography ==
Thomas Eugune Watson was born on January 18, 1892, in Oskaloosa, Iowa. He attended Penn College in Oskaloosa and on November 11, 1912, enlisted in the Marine Corps. He was commissioned a second lieutenant in the Marine Corps on October 20, 1916.

For the next three years he was a member of the Second Provisional Brigade in the Dominican Republic and on several occasions participated in engagements with bandits in that country.

He returned to the States in April 1919, but one year later was again on foreign shore duty, on this occasion with the Guardia Nacional of the Dominican Republic.

In 1924, he returned to the States and was assigned to the Marine Corps Base, San Diego, California, where he was commanding officer of the recruit detachment and officer-in-charge, drills and instruction.

Three years later, in March 1927, he joined the Third Marine Brigade in China and saw service in Shanghai, Tientsin, and Hsin Ho.

Upon return to this country he attended the Field Officers' School, Marine Corps Schools, Quantico, Virginia, whereupon completion of the course he remained as an instructor.

From October 1930 to February 1934, he was successively U.S. Naval Attache, Santo Domingo City, Dominican Republic, a member of the Major General Commandant's Department, Headquarters Marine Corps, director of operations and area commander, Nicaragua National Guard Detachment, and again a member of the Major General Commandant's Department.

After a year as commanding officer of the naval prison, Navy Yard, Mare Island, California, he assumed duties as commanding officer, Second Battalion, Sixth Marine Regiment and in July 1936, became assistant chief of staff, Four Section, and chief of the planning section, Fleet Marine Force.

In August 1937, he was assigned as a student at the Army War College, Washington, D.C., and upon graduation was ordered to Headquarters Marine Corps, where he became chief of the war plans section, Division of Plans and Policies. In November 1941, he assumed duties as executive officer of the Division of Plans and Policies.

Four months after the United States' entry into World War II, Watson joined the Third Marine Brigade as chief of staff and sailed for Samoa in April 1942, where he took command of the brigade in August 1942.

In November 1943, he became commanding general of Tactical Group One, which included the Twenty-Second Marine Regiment and certain Army units and led this organization in the assault and capture of Eniwetok Atoll, Marshall Islands, from February 6, to March 22, 1944, for which he was awarded the Distinguished Service Medal.

General Watson became commanding general of the Second Marine Division in April 1944, and led that organization in active operations against enemy forces at Saipan and Tinian in the Marianas Islands for which he was awarded a Gold Star in lieu of a second Distinguished Service Medal.

During the period April 1 – April 13, 1945, he led the division as part of Task Group 51.2 in diversionary activities off the coast of Okinawa and as a floating reserve for the U.S. Tenth Army.

In August 1945, he returned to Headquarters Marine Corps and became director of personnel, which position he held until detached in June 1946. At that time he assumed command of the Second Marine Division and Camp Lejeune, North Carolina. In December 1947, he was assigned as Commanding General, Fleet Marine Force, Pacific. From December 1946 to January 1947, he was the first acting commander of Fleet Marine Force, Atlantic.

LtGen Watson died on March 6, 1966, in a hospital in the Panama Canal Zone.

== Awards and decorations ==
Lt. Gen. Watson's awards include:

1st Row	Navy Distinguished Service Medal w/1 award star			
2nd Row	Marine Corps Good Conduct Medal	Marine Corps Expeditionary Medal w/1 service star	Mexican Service Medal	Dominican Campaign Medal
3rd Row	World War I Victory Medal w/West Indies clasp	Yangtze Service Medal	Nicaraguan Campaign Medal (1933)	American Defense Service Medal
4th Row	Asiatic-Pacific Campaign Medal w/4 service stars	World War II Victory Medal	Dominican Military Medal of Merit with Diploma	Nicaraguan Medal of Distinction with Diploma

=== Award citation ===
For outstanding services in his capacity as commanding general of the Second Marine Division at the Battle of Saipan and Battle of Tinian, he was awarded an award star in lieu of a second Navy Distinguished Service Medal. His citation reads in part:

As Commanding General of the Second Marine Division during the assault on the capture of Saipan and Tinian Islands, from June 15, to August 1, 1944, Major General Watson welded his unit into an effective striking force.

Fearlessly moving ashore with his men during the critical period of the landing operations, he established his headquarters near the Japanese lines and personally directed his troops with brilliant tactical skill and aggressive determination against vigorous opposition, successfully routing the enemy.

Although the division was depleted in numerical strength and physical endurance by twenty-five days of heavy fighting on Saipan, he expeditiously reorganized his forces and attained a high state of combat readiness for the subsequent landing on Tinian.

Distinguishing himself by his indomitable fighting spirit and inspiring leadership throughout these hazardous operations, Major General Watson contributed in a large measure to the success of the vital Marianas Campaign.
