= Paul J. Halloran =

United States Navy admiral (1896–1971)

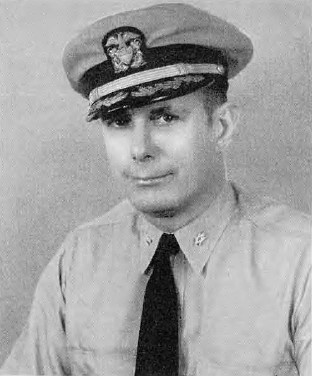
- Born: 26 June 1896; Norwood, Massachusetts, U.S.
- Died: 14 February 1971 (aged 74); Yorktown Heights, New York, U.S.
- Military career
- Allegiance: United States
- Branch: United States Navy Civil Engineer Corps
- Service years: 1921–1948
- Rank: Rear Admiral
- Commands: 6th Naval Construction Brigade
- Conflicts: World War II; Mariana Islands campaign; Battle of Saipan; Battle of Tinian; Air raids on Japan
- Awards: Legion of Merit (2); Navy Commendation Ribbon; National Order of Honor and Merit (Haiti)

Paul James Halloran (26 June 1896 – 14 February 1971) was a United States Navy admiral. During World War II he was the construction officer with the V Amphibious Corps in the Battle of Saipan and Battle of Tinian during the Mariana Islands campaign. He designed a vehicle called a "Doodlebug" that allowed the marines to scale low cliffs. After the battle he was in charge of the development of air bases on Tinian.

== Early life and career ==
Paul James Halloran was born in Norwood, Massachusetts, on 26 June 1896. His primary education was in New York schools. He graduated from Dartmouth College with a Bachelor of Science degree in 1919, and from its Thayer School of Engineering with a Master of Science degree the following year. In 1921 he joined the United States Navy's Civil Engineer Corps as a Lieutenant (junior grade).

As a civil engineer, Halloran worked as a draftsman for Westinghouse, Church, Kerr & Company; as a design engineer for Dwight P. Robinson; and as assistant chief designer for the Standard Oil Company of New York. As a naval reservist, he served as public works officer at Parris Island, South Carolina and Quantico, Virginia. He was contract superintendent at Naval Station Great Lakes and the Norfolk Navy Yard, and project superintendent at the Charleston Navy Yard and the New York Navy Yard. While serving at the Naval Station Great Lakes, he met Catherine Lenihan, the daughter of Brigadier General Michael J. Lenihan, the commander of the Sixth Corps Area, based at Fort Sheridan, Illinois. They had two sons, Richard and David, and a daughter, Joan.

Halloran served in Haiti from 1926 to 1929, overseeing development projects while on loan to the State Department. He was awarded the National Order of Honour and Merit by the government Haiti for his work there. From July 1937 to April 1939, he served in Samoa, where he oversaw the construction of a library, and was made an honorary chief. While he was assigned to the Norfolk Navy Yard from April 1939 to January 1942, he oversaw the construction of the world's largest drydock and stationary harbor crane.

== World War II ==
During World War II, he was public works officer at the Naval Operating Base in Newport, Rhode Island., from 19 January 1942 to June 1943, where he supervised the construction of $100 million (equivalent to $1514 million in 2024) of naval facilities. After the war, he was awarded the Navy Commendation Ribbon for this work. In 1944, he received the American Concrete Institute's Wason Medal for a paper on underwater concrete. From June 1943 to June 1944, he was responsible for closing out all the Navy's cost plus fixed-fee contracts with the Bureau of Yards and Docks.

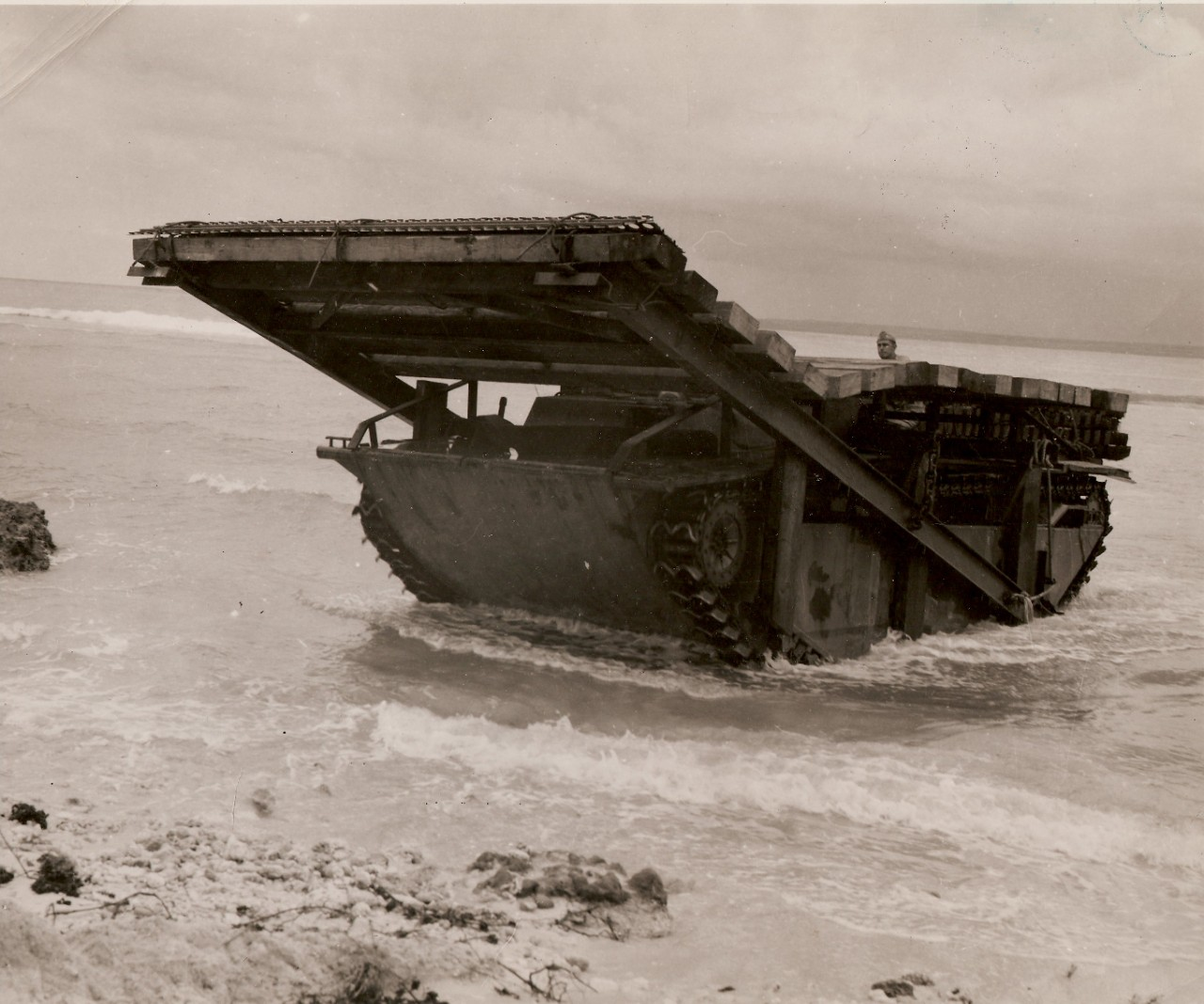
Demonstration of the Doodlebug on Saipan

In June 1944, Halloran assumed command of the 6th Naval Construction Brigade. In the initial stages of Operation Forager, the invasion of the Mariana Islands, he also served as construction officer of the Northern Troops Landing Force (NTLF) (Task Group 56.1), built around the V Amphibious Corps. The island of Tinian was largely surrounded by low coral cliffs, so he designed a landing ramp that could be carried on an Landing Vehicle Tracked (LVT) to allow the Marines to scale them. This was called a "Doodlebug". To construct them, marines and Seabees used a pair of 10-inch (250 mm) steel I-beams salvaged from an abandoned sugar mill in Saipan on an LVT to support a timber mat made of eighteen 6-by-12-inch (150 by 300 mm) wooden beams.

The Doodlebugs drove up to the cliff face, firmly attached hooks to the cliff tops and then backed away from under the ramps, leaving them in place, with the other end falling into the water. The ramp crews checked that the ramps were firmly anchored and then the Doodlebugs drove over them to the top of the cliffs. The ramps were strong enough to hold the weight of a 35-short-ton (32 t) medium tank. Ten were built, of which six were used in the assault, carried to Tinian by the Dock landing ship (LSD) USS Ashland, and were very successful. For his services, Halloran was awarded the Legion of Merit.

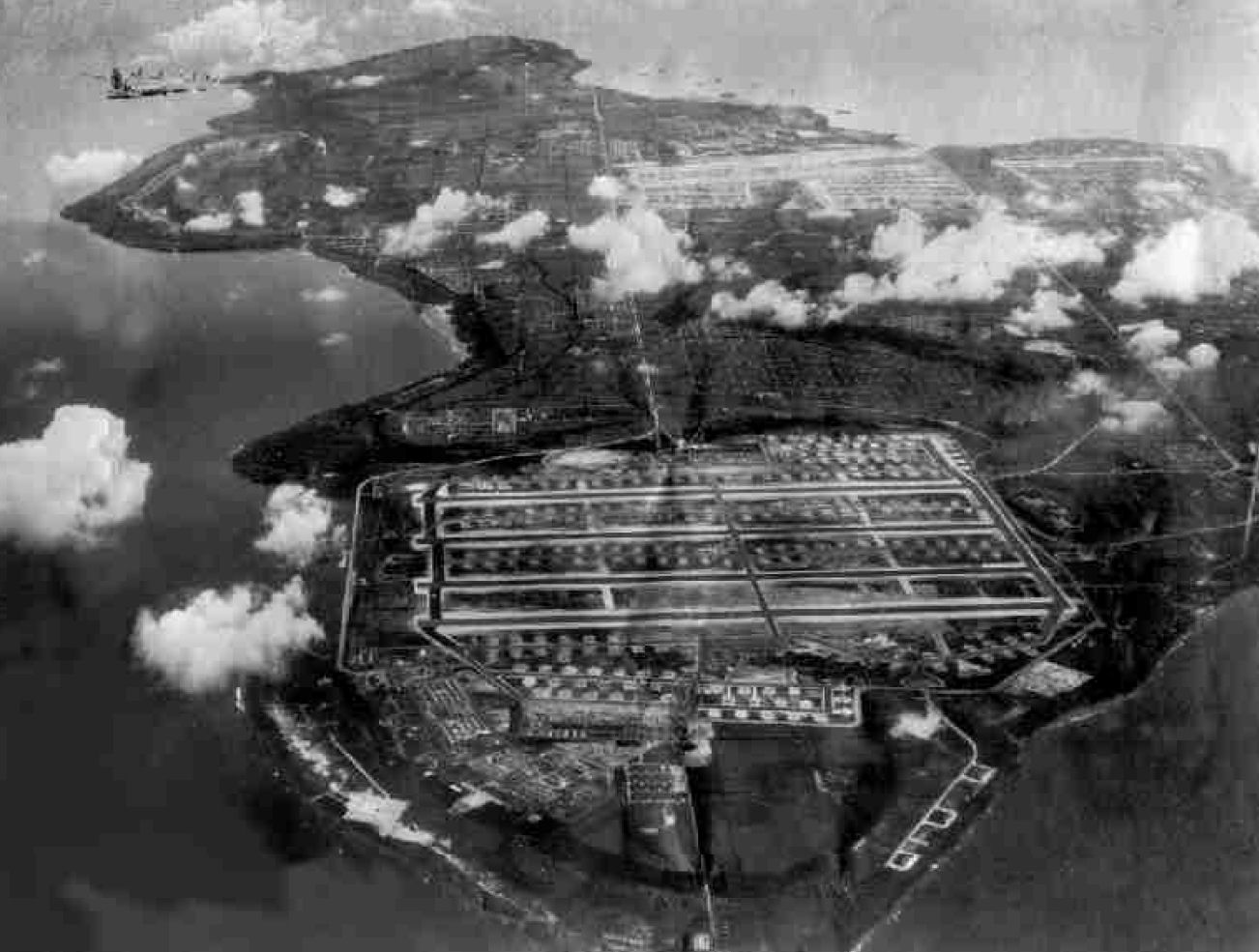
Tinian after airfield construction. The massive North Field is in front, West Field in background.

Halloran undertook the transformation of Tinian into an airbase for Boeing B-29 Superfortress bombers. For this work his brigade had the 29th and 30th Naval Construction Regiments; a third regiment, the 49th Naval Construction Regiment, arrived in March 1945. The magnitude of the task was enormous. Two air bases were constructed: North Field and West Field. North Field alone had four 8,500-foot (2,600 m) runways, with 8 miles (13 km) of taxiways, 265 hardstands, 173 Quonset huts and 92 other buildings. Its construction involved 2,109,800 cubic yards (1,613,100 m^{3}) of excavations. In addition, the bases were provided with roads, fuel storage installations, hospitals and a deepwater harbor. For "outstanding service in charge of construction of an important base in the Pacific", Halloran was awarded an oak leaf cluster to his Legion of Merit. He was promoted to the wartime rank of commodore on 3 April 1945.

== Post-war ==
After the war ended, Halloran became the public works officer of the 5th Naval District at its headquarters in Norfolk, Virginia. He retired from the Navy in 1948 with the rank of rear admiral and joined Foley Brothers Construction Company as a vice president. In this role he oversaw construction projects in the United States and Latin America. He retired from Foley Brothers in 1958. In retirement, he completed a three-year course in commercial art and illustration at the Westport Art Institute.

Halloran died at his home in Yorktown Heights, New York, on 14 February 1971. His papers are in the American Heritage Center at the University of Wyoming.
