= Goichi Oie =

- 大家 吾一
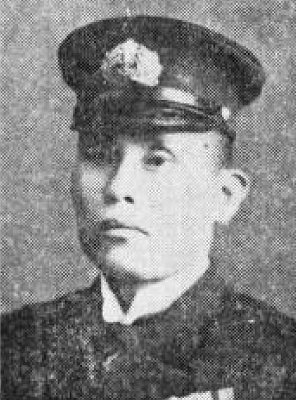
- Born: 17 February 1897; Oita Prefecture, Japan
- Died: 2 August 1944 (aged 47); Tinian, Mariana Islands
- Military career
- Allegiance: Empire of Japan
- Branch: Imperial Japanese Navy
- Service years: 1918–1944
- Rank: Rear Admiral (posthumous)
- Commands: 69th Guard Unit; 56th Guard Unit
- Conflicts: Second Sino-Japanese War; World War II; Battle of Tinian †

Goichi Oie (大家 吾一, Oie Goichi; 17 February 1897 – 2 August 1944) was a captain in the Imperial Japanese Navy during World War II, and died during the Battle of Tinian.

== Biography ==
=== Early career ===
Goichi Oie was born on 17 February 1897. He enlisted in the Etajima Naval Academy's 46th Class, graduating as an ensign candidate on 21 November 1918 and commissioning as an ensign on 1 August 1919.

Oie attended the Naval Submarine School as a regular student in 1922 and later graduated from the 23rd Advanced Communications course held at the Naval Torpedo School in 1924. During his early career, he served on a number of ships and submarines, including the gunboat Saga, destroyer Kashi, Submarine No.45, and Submarine Ro-61.

On 1 December 1924 Oie was promoted to lieutenant and assigned to the Protected cruiser Hirado as a division leader on 1 December 1926. The following year Hirado patrolled waters in China and Oie temporarily landed in Shanghai to lead the cruiser's Naval Landing Force company in protecting Japanese expatriates the city.

During the Japanese invasion of Manchuria in 1932, he served with the Imperial Japanese Navy's Expeditionary Force on the Songhua River.

=== Second Sino-Japanese War ===
Oie was transferred to Battleship Mutsu as head of communications and a division leader on 1 July 1937. Shortly after the outbreak of the Battle of Shanghai on 13 August 1937, Mutsu would undertake the transit of 2,000 troops of the Imperial Japanese Army's 11th Division to the mouth of the Yangtze River. Oie's service aboard Mutsu continued until August 1938 when he was reassigned to Yokosuka Naval District.

From October 1938 to April 1940, he served as an instructor at the Naval Communications School, while concurrently a member of the Naval Engineering Research Institute, Yokosuka Naval Arsenal Communications Experiment Department, and Naval Engineering Council.

On April 22, 1940 he was made executive officer of the Heavy Cruiser Takao. Only a few months later on October 15 Oie was commissioned as an Inspector with the East Asia Development Board and posted to the Central China Liaison Department in Shanghai. There he was responsible for overseeing maritime transport and communications, as well as liaising with local naval forces.

=== Pacific War ===
Oie remained in China during the first half of the Pacific War. He was ordered back to Yokosuka Naval District on 26 April 1943. A few months after, on 1 July 1943, he was posted to the Yokosuka Naval Supply Bureau as head of the General Affairs Section.

On 1 February 1944, Oie was made commander of the newly formed 69th Guard Unit raised in Yokosuka. Although initially intended for deployment to Kosrae Island, on 11 February per request of the Combined Fleet the unit was redirected to Tinian. The advance party of Oie's Guard Unit departed Yokosuka on February 13, followed by the unit's main force on 28 February. On 1 March the unit was renamed to the 56th Guard Unit, with Oie maintaining his position as commander.

During the Battle of Tinian, Oie's 56th Guard Unit fought until their annihilation. Oie is recorded as charging with his men into a group of enemy tanks during one of the final assaults carried out on 31 July 1944. His official date of death is 2 August 1944, when he was posthumously promoted to Rear Admiral.
