= Mariana Naval Base =

Mariana Naval Base may refer to a United States Navy advance base on the Mariana Islands in the Pacific Ocean built during World War II:

- Naval Base Guam
  - Naval Station Guam (disambiguation)
- Naval Advance Base Saipan
- Tinian Naval Base
  - Mariana and Palau Islands campaign
