= O Ye Jigs & Juleps! =

1962 book by Virginia Cary Hudson

- First edition cover
- Author: Virginia Cary Hudson
- Illustrator: Karla Kuskin
- Language: English
- Publisher: Macmillan
- Publication date: 1962
- Publication place: United States

O Ye Jigs & Juleps! is a short book by Virginia Cary Hudson, first published in 1962 with illustrations by Karla Kuskin. It is a series of 10 short essays written by the then 10-year-old Hudson in 1904, while attending an Episcopalian school in "Leesville" (actually Versailles, Kentucky). The essays concern religion to a considerable extent, but the book is largely known for its somewhat unintentional humor. The book was a bestseller in 1962.

A large portion of the book is Hudson's observations on her Episcopalian upbringing and religion in general. This has made it of interest to Episcopalian and Anglican readers. In 1962 it made the "Anglican Book Club Prior Selections." It was adapted into a play in 1992.

One example is from her view of Sacraments: "When you are little and ugly somebody carries you in church on a pillow, and you come out a child of God and inheritor of the Kingdom of Heaven. They pour water on your head and that's a sacrament. When you are twelve you walk back in yourself with your best dress and shoes on, and your new prayer book your mother buys you, and you walk up to the Bishop, and he stands up, and you knell down, and he mashes on your head, and you are an Episcopal. Then you are supposed to increase in spirit. Then everyone kisses you and that's a sacrament. Only I left out the bread and wine. That's a sacrament too. I tasted some of the bread in the choir room and it tasted just like my gold fish wafers."

The title of the book is a reference to a Biblical text used in Episcopal worship sometimes called the Canticle of the Three Young Men, or the Benedicite.

Three follow-up works were published, Flapdoodle, Trust & Obey, Credo & Quips and Close Your Eyes When Praying.
