= Karla Kuskin =

American author, poet, illustrator, and literary reviewer (1932-2009)

- Born: Karla Seidman; July 17, 1932; New York City, U.S.
- Died: August 20, 2009 (aged 77); Seattle, Washington
- Education: Antioch College; Yale University
- Occupations: Author, illustrator, poet
- Spouse(s): Charles M. Kuskin (m. 1955–1979); William L. Bell, Jr. (m. 1989)
- Children: Nicholas and Julia
- Writing career
- Pen name: Nicholas J. Charles
- Genre: Children's Literature
- Notable works: Roar and More; In the Middle of the Trees; ABCDEFGHIJKLMNOPQRSTUVWXYZ; The Rose on My Cake; Soap Soup and Other Verses
- Notable awards: National Council of Teachers of English Award for Excellence in Poetry

Karla Kuskin (née Seidman) (July 17, 1932 – August 20, 2009) was a prolific American author, poet, illustrator, and reviewer of children's literature. Kuskin was known for her poetic, alliterative style.

She sometimes wrote under the pseudonym Nicholas J. Charles. Kuskin reviewed children's literature in The New York Times Book Review.

== Biography ==
Born in 1932 in Manhattan, New York, Karla Seidman was the only child of Sidney and Mitzi Seidman, and was raised in Greenwich Village, New York City.

She attended the Little Red School House, followed by Elisabeth Irwin High School. She then attended Antioch College in 1950–53, and transferred to Yale University where she studied with, among others, Josef Albers, Herbert Matter and Alvin Eisenman. She earned her B.F.A in graphic design in 1955 from Yale.

Before working as a full-time author, she worked as an assistant to a fashion photographer, a design assistant, and in advertising. Her first book, Roar and More (Harper, 1956), came out of her senior graphic arts project at Yale to design and print a book on a small press.

Kuskin wrote Paul in 1994, with paintings by Milton Avery, which had originally been created for an abandoned children's book, to go with a (now lost) story by writer H. R. Hays, nearly thirty years after the painter's death.

Her autobiography, Thoughts, Pictures, and Words, with photographs by her son Nicholas, was published in 1995.

She lived and worked in Brooklyn for most of her life, moving to Bainbridge Island, Washington, then settling in Seattle at the end of her life.

In August 2009, Kuskin died of corticobasal degeneration in Seattle, at age 77.

== Personal life ==
She was married to Charles M. Kuskin, oboist, from 1955–1979, and in 1989 married William L. Bell, Jr., a lawyer with the Center for Naval Analyses.

== Bibliography ==
Kuskin both wrote and illustrated nearly half of the books credited to her.

=== As author/illustrator (selected) ===
- Roar and More (1956)
- James and the Rain (1957)
- In the Middle of the Trees (Harper, 1958) — poems
- The Animals and the Ark (1958)
- Just like Everyone Else (1959)
- Which Horse Is William? (1959)
- Square as a House (1960)
- The Bear Who Saw the Spring (1961)
- All Sizes of Noises (1962)
- Alexander Soames: His Poems (1962) — as Nicholas J. Charles
- How Do You Get from Here to There? (1962)
- ABCDEFGHIJKLMNOPQRSTUVWXYZ (Harper & Row, 1963)
- The Rose on My Cake (Harper & Row, 1964) — poems
- Sand and Snow (1965) — as Nicholas J. Charles
- Jane Anne June Spoon and Her Very Adventurous Search for the Moon (1966)
- The Walk the Mouse Girls Took (1967)
- Watson, the Smartest Dog in the U.S.A. (1968)
- In the Flaky Frosty Morning (1969)
- Any Me I Want to Be (1972) — poems
- What Did You Bring Me? (1973)
- Near the Window Tree (1975) — poems and notes
- A Boy Had a Mother Who Bought Him a Hat (1976)
- Herbert Hated Being Small (1979)
- Dogs and Dragons, Trees and Dreams (1980) — poetry collection
- spring {1958} – poem
- Night Again (1981)
- Something Sleeping in the Hall (1985)
- The Philharmonic Gets Dressed (1986)
- Soap Soup (HarperCollins, 1992)
- City Dog (1994)
- My Life in the Sky (2000)
- a space story {1978}

=== As author (selected) ===
- A Space Story, illustrated by Marc Simont (1978)
- The Philharmonic Gets Dressed, illustrated by Mark Simont (1982) — nominated for a National Book Award
- The Dallas Titans Get Ready for Bed, illustrated by Mark Simont (1986)
- Jerusalem, Shining Still, illustrated by David Frampton (1987)
- A Great Miracle Happened There: A Chanukah Story, illustrated by Robert Andrew Parker (1993)
- Paul, paintings by Milton Avery (1994)
- Patchwork Island, illustrated by Petra Mathers (1994)
- City Noise, illustrated by Renee Flower (1994)
- James and the Rain, illustrated by Reg Cartwright (1995)
- The Upstairs Cat, illustrated by Howard Fine (1997)
- The Animals and the Ark, illustrated by Michael Grejniec (2002)
- The Sky Is Always in the Sky, illustrated by Isabelle Dervaux (1998)
- I Am Me, illustrated by Dyanna Wolcott (2000)
- Moon, Have You Met My Mother? The Collected Poems of Karla Kuskin, illustrated by Sergio Ruzzier (2003)
- Under My Hood I Have a Hat, illustrated by Fumi Kosaka (2004)
- Ice Cream Dreams, illustrated by Lewis Matheney (2005)
- Toots the Cat, illustrated by Lisze Bechtold (2005)
- So, What's It Like to Be a Cat?, illustrated by Betsy Lewin (2005) — 2006 Scandiuzzi Children's Book Award winner

=== As illustrator ===
- O Ye Jigs & Juleps!, Virginia Cary Hudson, 1962
- Traces, Paula Fox, 2008
