= Frederick Kimble =

United States Army general (1895–1978)

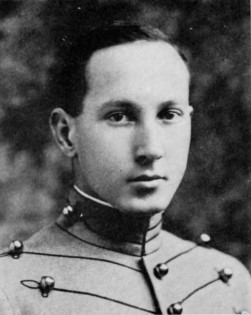
- Kimble as a West Point cadet in 1918
- Born: 10 August 1895; Portland, Oregon, U.S.
- Died: 19 August 1978 (aged 83); Annandale, Virginia, US
- Burial place: Episcopal Cemetery, Galveston, Texas, U.S.
- Military career
- Allegiance: United States
- Branch: Infantry (1918–1926); United States Army Air Corps (1926–1947); United States Air Force (1947–1953)
- Service years: 1918–1953
- Rank: Brigadier General
- Commands: Air Corps Advanced Flying School; 7th Flying Training Wing; Army Garrison Force Tinian Island
- Conflicts: World War I; World War II
- Awards: Legion of Merit (2); Commendation Ribbon

Frederick von Harten Kimble (10 August 1895 – 19 August 1978) was a United States Air Force brigadier general. Kimble graduated from the United States Military Academy at West Point, New York, in June 1918 with the lowest grades in his class. He was commissioned in the Infantry Branch but transferred to the United States Army Air Corps in 1926. During World War II, he commanded the Air Corps Advanced Flying School where the Tuskegee Airmen were trained, and the island of Tinian, from which the atomic bombings of Hiroshima and Nagasaki were launched.

== Early life ==
Frederick von Harten Kimble was born in Portland, Oregon, on 10 August 1895, the son of Edwin Kimble and his wife Elvira von Harten Kimble. He had an older brother, Edwin Richardson Kimble. His father died in 1901 and the family moved to Galveston, Texas, where Elvira's sister, Agnes von Harten, lived. He was educated at Rosenberg Elementary School and Ball High School in Galveston, graduating in 1913. Kimble entered the United States Military Academy at West Point, New York, on 15 June 1915, just three days after his older brother Edwin had graduated second in the class of 1915.

== World War I ==
During World War I, Edwin was attached to the British V Corps on the Western Front, and he died of sepsis after a surgical operation on 9 April 1918. Due to the war, Kimble's class, which was to have been the class of 1919, graduated early, on 12 June 1918. Kimble graduated as the last of his class, ranked 137th.

Kimble was commissioned as a second lieutenant in the 36th Infantry, part of the 12th Division. He was sent to Fort Sill, Oklahoma, for a 10-week course at the Infantry School of Arms. After graduation, he became an infantry instructor in trench mortars, one-pounders, hand grenades, bayonets, field fortifications and physical training, first at Fort Sill, and then at Camp Benning, Georgia. He was promoted to the temporary rank of first lieutenant on 1 October 1918.

== Between the wars ==
After the war ended, Kimble applied for a four-year secondment to the United States Army Air Corps, but his request was denied. He was promoted to first lieutenant on 22 October 1919. From May to October 1922, he was aide-de-camp to Brigadier General George Van Horn Moseley at Fort Sheridan, Illinois.

In October 1922, Kimble entered the United States Army Air Service Primary Flying School at Brooks Field, Texas. He graduated in June 1923, and then entered the Air Service Advanced Flying School at Kelly Field, Texas, from whence he graduated in January 1924. He was assigned to the 26th Attack Squadron, which was based at Kelly Field as part of the 3rd Attack Group, as an assistant engineering officer and an operations officer. In August 1924, he went to Clark Field at Camp Stotsenburg in the Philippines, where he served with the 3rd Pursuit Squadron.

In September 1926, Kimble became the assistant department air officer at the Philippine Department headquarters in Manila. He was transferred to the Air Corps on 27 September 1926. Kimble returned to the United States in March 1927, and was assigned to the 1st Pursuit Group at Brooks Field. He was the commandant of the Flying Cadet Detachment and an instructor at the Air Corps Primary Flying School at March Field, California, from October 1927 to 12 May 1929.

For his next assignment, Kimble went to Washington, D.C., as an aide to the Assistant Secretary of War. He was an aide at the White House from May 1930 to September 1934 and was promoted to captain on 1 October 1933, after fifteen years as a lieutenant. He was a student at the Air Corps Tactical School at Maxwell Field, Alabama, until 15 September 1934, and then a student at United States Army Command and General Staff College at Fort Leavenworth, Kansas, until 1 July 1936, after which he returned to the Air Corps Tactical School as an instructor in combat orders and naval operations. Despite being the lowest-ranked member of his West Point class, he was the first to be promoted to major, when he was promoted to the temporary rank on 27 October 1936. His rank became substantive on 1 May 1940.

== World War II ==
Kimble returned to Washington, D.C., as the Assistant Chief of Staff in the Plans Division of the Office of the Chief of Air Corps. In May 1941, he became the chief of the Airport Section in the office's Building and Grounds Division. He was promoted to the temporary rank of lieutenant colonel in the Air Corps on 15 March 1941 and the substantive rank in the wartime Army of the United States on 12 June 1941.

Promotion to the temporary rank of colonel in the Air Corps followed on 5 January 1942, three days before his next assignment, as commanding officer of the Air Corps Advanced Flying School at Tuskegee Army Air Field, Alabama. The base was responsible for training the African-American Tuskegee Airmen. Racial segregation was well-established at the time, both on the base and in the neighboring town of Tuskegee, and Kimble enforced it. Black and white personnel lived in separate quarters, ate their meals in separate dining facilities, and used separate toilets. He discouraged fraternization between the white instructors and the black trainees and preferred that black personnel remain on the base rather than go into the town, out of concern that whites might cause trouble. While black personnel regarded his tenure negatively, Kimble saw it in a positive light, later recalling:

My work at the Tuskegee Flying School has been one of the most interesting experiences of my entire career. I have enjoyed the work thoroughly and feel that I possibly have helped to some small degree advancement of the program at this station which is to train colored Americans to fly our fastest pursuit ships.

In December 1942, Kimble became the Southwest Air Corps Training Center commander at Cochran Field, Georgia. He was succeeded at Tuskegee by Lieutenant Colonel Noel F. Parrish. Kimble was promoted to brigadier general on 27 April 1943 and was awarded the Legion of Merit for commanding the Southwest Air Corps Training Center. He then assumed command of the 27th Flying Training Wing at Cochran Field.

Kimble became commander of the island of Tinian in the Philippine Sea on 28 November 1944. Bombers based on Tinian participated in the campaign of air raids on Japan, including the bombing of Tokyo on 10 March 1945, and the atomic bombings of Hiroshima and Nagasaki on 6 and 9 August 1945. He was awarded an oak leaf cluster for his service as island commander.

== Post-war ==
After the war ended, Kimble returned to Washington, D.C., as the Deputy Air Inspector at United States Army Air Forces headquarters on 26 July 1946. He transferred to the United States Air Force (USAF) on 1 June 1947 and became deputy to the air inspector for field operations at Langley Field, Virginia. On 1 December 1947 he went to Alaska as the commanding general of the Aleutian Section of the Alaskan Air Command, for which he was awarded a Commendation Ribbon. He became a substantive brigadier general in the USAF on 19 February 1948. He returned to Washington, D.C., once more on 21 February 1949, as a member of the Secretary of the Air Force Personnel Council at Air Force headquarters, becoming its deputy director in July 1949.

Kimble retired from the USAF with the rank of brigadier general in 1953. He lived in northern Virginia and was elected president of the Army and Navy Club there. He never married, and for most of his career, he lived with his mother. In 1972 he moved into an aged care home in Annandale, Virginia, where he died on 19 August 1978. He was buried in the family plot at the Episcopal Cemetery in Galveston.

== Dates of rank ==
Insignia	Rank	Component	Date	Reference
	Second Lieutenant	Infantry	12 June 1918	
	First Lieutenant (temporary)	Infantry	1 October 1918	
	First Lieutenant	Infantry	22 October 1919	
	First Lieutenant	Air Corps	27 September 1926	
	Captain	Air Corps	1 October 1933	
	Major (temporary)	Air Corps	26 October 1936	
	Major	Air Corps	1 May 1940	
	Lieutenant Colonel (temporary)	Air Corps	15 March 1941	
	Lieutenant Colonel	Army of the United States	12 June 1941	
	Colonel (temporary)	Air Corps	5 January 1942	
	Colonel	Army of the United States	1 February 1942	
	Lieutenant Colonel	Air Corps	4 September 1942	
	Brigadier General	Army of the United States	27 April 1943	
	Brigadier General	United States Air Force	19 February 1948	
