= Noel F. Parrish =

United States Air Force general (1909–1987)

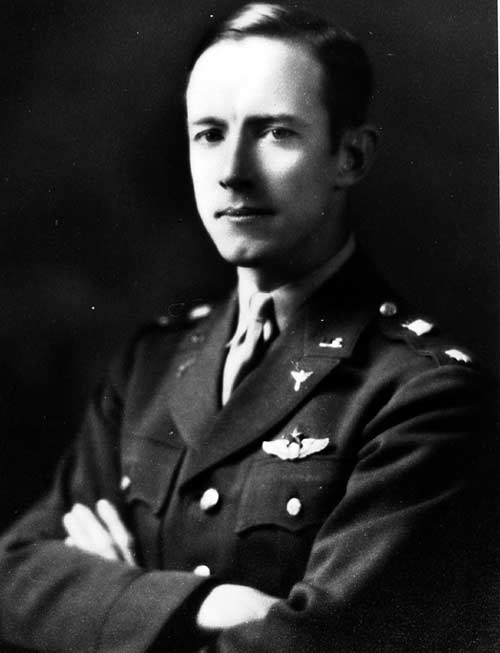
- Noel F. Parrish when a lieutenant colonel
- Born: November 11, 1909; Versailles, Kentucky, US
- Died: April 7, 1987 (aged 77); Piney Point, Maryland, US
- Burial place: Arlington National Cemetery
- Military career
- Allegiance: United States
- Branch: United States Army; United States Air Force
- Service years: 1930–1964
- Rank: Brigadier general
- Commands: Tuskegee Airmen, Tuskegee Army Air Field
- Conflicts: World War II; Korean War
- Awards: Legion of Merit; Air Medal
- Other work: Professor

Noel Francis Parrish (November 11, 1909 – April 7, 1987) was an American brigadier general in the United States Air Force who was the white commander of a group of black airmen known as the Tuskegee Airmen during World War II. He was a key factor in the program's success and in their units being assigned to combat duty. Parrish was born and raised in the south-east United States; he joined the U.S. Army in 1930. He served in the military from 1930 until 1964, and retired as a brigadier general in 1964.

Parrish's association with the Tuskegee Airmen began when he was assigned to be the Assistant Director of Training of the Eastern Flying Training Command. On December 5, 1941, Parrish was promoted to the position of Director of Training at Tuskegee Army Flying School in Alabama. One year later in December 1942 Parrish became the Tuskegee Army Air Field commander.

The prestigious "Brigadier General Noel F. Parrish Award" was so named due to Parrish's efforts to desegregate his troops, reduce overcrowding, increase morale, and improve relations between Tuskegee's residents and the inhabitants of the base. Tuskegee's highest award has been named the "Brigadier General Noel F. Parrish Award" in honor of its titular namesake.

== Early life and career ==
Born in Versailles, Kentucky, to a Southern white minister, Parrish spent parts of his youth living in Alabama and Georgia. His birthplace is often listed as being in nearby Lexington, Kentucky. He graduated from Cullman High School, Cullman, Alabama in 1924 and Rice Institute, Houston, Texas in 1928. He dropped out of graduate school after one year and decided to hitchhike to San Francisco. The lack of work meant hunger, so he chose to join the United States Army's 11th Cavalry Regiment as a private on July 30, 1930, serving in Monterey, California.

After a year in the horse cavalry, Parrish became an aviation cadet in June 1931 and subsequently qualified as an enlisted pilot. He completed flight training in 1932 and was assigned to the 13th Attack Squadron at Fort Crockett, near Galveston, Texas. One year later in September 1933 Parrish joined the Air Corps Technical School at Chanute Field, Illinois; later transferring to the First Air Transport Squadron at Dayton, Ohio. In July 1935 he rejoined the 13th Attack Squadron as assistant operations officer, then located at Barksdale Field, Louisiana. Parrish became a flying instructor at Randolph Field in April 1938, and by July 1939 he was a supervisor at the Air Corps Flying School in Glenview, Illinois. Commissioned as a lieutenant in 1939, Parrish attended the Air Command and Staff School at Maxwell Field, Alabama. As a captain, and still a student at Maxwell, his association with the Tuskegee Airmen began as in March 1941 when he was assigned as Assistant Director of Training of the Eastern Flying Training Command. Upon graduation in June 1941, he chose to remain at Maxwell, and work with the Tuskegee Institute as a primary flight instructor. By doing so, he gave up his own desires for a combat command. On December 5, 1941, two days before the attack on Pearl Harbor, he was promoted to Director of Training at Tuskegee Army Flying School in Alabama, assuming command of Tuskegee Army Air Field a year later, in December 1942.

== Tuskegee Airmen Experiment ==
=== Formation of the Tuskegee Airmen Experiment ===
Black Americans were not permitted to fly for the U.S. armed services prior to 1940. The Air Corps at that time, which had never had a single black member, was part of an army that possessed exactly two black Regular line officers at the beginning of World War II: Brigadier Generals Benjamin O. Davis Sr. and Benjamin O. Davis Jr. The first Civilian Pilot Training Program (CPTP) students completed their instruction in May 1940.

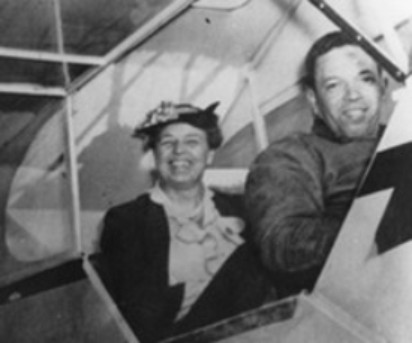
Eleanor Roosevelt and Charles "Chief" Anderson on April 19, 1941.

The creation of an all-black pursuit squadron resulted from pressure by civil rights organizations and the black press who pushed for the establishment of a unit at Tuskegee, an Alabama base, in 1941. The Tuskegee Institute was selected by the military for the "Tuskegee (Airmen) Experiment" because of its commitment to aeronautical training. Tuskegee had the facilities, engineering and technical instructors, as well as a climate for year-round flying. Eleanor Roosevelt, who was interested in the Tuskegee aviation program, took a 40-minute flight around the base in a plane piloted by Charles "Chief" Anderson on April 19, 1941. Anderson was a self-taught black civilian and experienced aviator who learned how to fly before the war. He was hired by the Tuskegee program to be its Chief Flight Instructor. Anderson has been referred to as the 'Ancient Mariner' of black aviation, having flown long before many of the new recruits were of age.

The Tuskegee program was then expanded and became the center for African-American aviation during World War II. Members of the Tuskegee unit became known as the Tuskegee Airmen. Formation of the black air units was announced by Under Secretary of War Robert P. Patterson on January 16, 1941. On March 19, 1941, the 99th Pursuit Squadron (Pursuit being an early World War II synonym for "Fighter") was established at Chanute Field in Rantoul, Illinois and activated three days later on March 22. Over 250 enlisted men formed the first group of black Americans trained at Chanute in aircraft ground support trades. This small number became the core of other black squadrons subsequently formed at Tuskegee and Maxwell Fields in Alabama. Later in 1941, the 99th Pursuit Squadron moved to Maxwell Field and then Tuskegee Field before deploying to combat in the Mediterranean Theater of Operations in 1943. Pilots, commanders, instructors, and maintenance and support staff comprised the "Tuskegee (Airmen) Experiment".

In December 1941, Parrish became the Director of Training at the school. By the end of 1942, Parrish had been promoted to the position of Tuskegee Army Air Field Commander. As Director of Training and later Tuskegee Field commander, Parrish played a key role in the program's success. There were approximately 14,000 ground support personnel at Tuskegee Field during the war and almost 1,000 graduating pilots, of which about 450 saw active combat during the war.

Exercises at a Booker T. Washington monument located at the Tuskegee Institute commemorated the beginning of black American pre-flight training for military aviation. The first twelve candidates for officer-flier positions were cited by America's black press as "the cream of the country's colored youth". The first classes started at the institute, and flying lessons soon began at the Tuskegee Army Air Field (TAAF) some approximately ten miles away. After it was built, government press releases recounted that the air field was developed and built by Negro contractors both skilled and unskilled. Of the original class, five students graduated in March 1942.

The PTI3A Stearman was the first type of training plane to be used in teaching the new recruits. The AT6 Texan, and P-40 Warhawk followed as the aircraft of choice over time. Much of the primary flight training was done at Moton Field at Tuskegee. Tuskegee trained over 1,000 black aviators during the war, about half of whom served overseas.

=== Initial problems ===
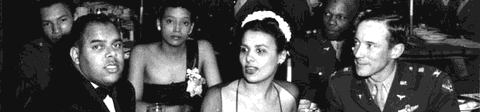
Noel Parrish (R) with Lena Horne and Tuskegee Airmen

Local white residents of the area objected almost immediately. They complained about black MPs challenging white people and patrolling the town while brandishing their military weapons. The first commanding officer, Major James Ellison, was supportive of his MPs; however, he was soon relieved of his command. A segregationist colonel, Frederick Kimble, replaced Ellison, and enforced segregation both on and off the base. This prompted black newspapers to protest his assignment. Kimble was transferred with a promotion, and Noel Parrish then took command as 'director of training'. The lack of assignments according to background and training led to an excess of non-aviation black officers without a mission. This became disparaging to morale, as the facility became overcrowded. As there was little in the line of recreation, Parrish began to arrange for celebrities to visit and perform at the base. Lena Horne, Joe Louis, Ella Fitzgerald, Ray Robinson, Louis Armstrong, and Langston Hughes were among the many guests. Parrish also desegregated the base to a much larger extent than his predecessors.

Parrish demanded high standards of performance of his men and did not view race as an issue. Parrish felt that what mattered was professionalism and an individual's capacities, techniques, and judgement. Parrish held his black trainees to the same high standards of performance as whites; and those who did not meet those standards were failed out of the program.

=== Tuskegee Airmen Experiment results ===
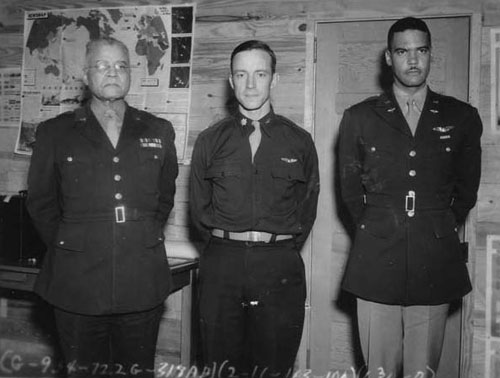
Benjamin O. Davis, Sr. (L), Noel F. Parrish (C), and Benjamin O. Davis, Jr. (R) at Tuskegee during World War II.

History views the results of the "Tuskegee Airmen Experiment" as a tremendous success, in which Parrish played a significant role, and proved that blacks could perform well in both leadership and combat roles. Parrish felt people should be judged by their capability, not their race. During its development Parrish would often return from Washington DC depressed because of the massive resistance to the Tuskegee program. Decades later at Tuskegee Airmen reunions, when Parrish's name was called everyone applauded with a standing ovation. The experience of the AAF during World War II necessitated that the military review its policies on the utilization of black servicemembers. Confrontation, discussion, and coordination with both black and white groups led AAF leaders to the conclusion that active commitment, leadership, and equal opportunity produced a more cost-effective, viable military force. In 1948, President Harry Truman signed an Executive Order on equality of treatment and opportunity in the military, due in no small part to the successes of the Tuskegee Airmen. Parrish was commander of Tuskegee Field from 1942 to 1946 and historians generally give him credit for improving morale, living conditions, relations between blacks and whites, and relations with local citizens.

Parrish, stated in his memoirs that he often mediated between the Army officials, whites near Tuskegee who felt that the airmen were uppity, and the aviation trainees themselves. Dr. Frederick D. Patterson, the third president of Tuskegee Institute, wrote to Parrish on September 14, 1944: "In my opinion, all who have had anything to do with the development and direction of the Tuskegee Army Air Field and the Army flying training program for Negroes in this area have just cause to be proud.... The development had to take place in a period of emergency and interracial confusion."

== After Tuskegee ==
Parrish stayed in command of the Tuskegee Airmen through the end of World War II in 1945 until August 20, 1946, when he was assigned to the Air University at Maxwell. During this time the war was winding down and the struggle to integrate the United States military heated up. Virtually all commanders submitted reports claiming that blacks took longer to train and performed more poorly than whites. Parrish was one of the few who did not do so. Parrish pointed out instances that showed blatant discrimination occurred against black airmen during the war, such as when there was a shortage of bomber pilots in Europe, white fighter pilots were sent to replace them despite the fact that fully trained black bomber pilots were available, even though flying fighter planes requires skills quite different from flying a bomber. Parrish also commented: "It is a discouraging fact that officers of the Army Air Force, whose scientific achievements are unsurpassed, and whose scientific skill is unquestioned in mechanical matters and in many personnel matters, should generally approach the problem of races and minorities with the most unscientific dogmatic and arbitrary attitudes.... Whether we like or dislike Negroes ... they are citizens of the United States having the same rights and privileges of other citizens...."

In August 1947 he entered the Air War College at Maxwell Field and graduated the following June. He then became deputy secretary of the Air Staff at Air Force Headquarters, Washington, D.C. and became a special assistant to the vice chief of staff there in January 1951. In September 1954 he became Air Deputy to the North Atlantic Treaty Organization Defense College, which was then located in Paris, France. On September 1, 1956, he became deputy director, Military Assistance Division, United States European Command, also in Paris. In May 1958 he returned to Air Force headquarters and became assistant for coordination to deputy chief of staff for Plans and Programs.

He eventually became a Brigadier General—retiring from the Air Force on October 1, 1964. His military decorations include the Legion of Merit and Air Medal. He earned a PhD from his alma mater, Rice University, and taught college history in Texas. Parrish died on Tuesday, April 7, 1987, of cardiac arrest at the Veterans Administration Medical Center in Piney Point, Maryland. At the service Lieutenant General Davis Jr. said "He may have been the only white person who believed that blacks could learn to fly airplanes."

== Family and personal life ==
Parrish was married twice, the second time to Dr. Florence Tucker Parrish-St.John, and had three stepsons Joseph Tucker, III of Dallas, Texas, F. Steven Tucker of Bel Air, Maryland, and James D. Tucker of Douglasville, Pennsylvania. He wrote magazine articles under a pen name and was interested in music and painting. Parrish was considered charming, witty, and likable. Looking younger than his years, he was also considered to be a ladies' man. Prior to being assigned to Tuskegee, he had not been actively involved with any of the black Americans' causes. Parrish had as a youth, however, hiked three miles to see where a black man had been lynched. He later recalled that when people heard of the project to train black pilots and mechanics, he often heard "weird and worried kind of laughter" from white people and that a visiting British flying ace once stated that it was better to have a "Messerschmitt on his tail than to try to teach a Negro to fly".

== Legacy ==
According to a 2001 presentation that won top prize at a National History Day competition, an 18-year-old Topeka High School student John Freeman wrote that the Tuskegee Airmen, America's first black military pilots, helped lay the groundwork for the civil rights movement. The most prestigious award of the association of Tuskegee Airmen, which is presented at the Tuskegee Airmen, Inc. annual convention, was named 'the Brigadier General Noel F. Parrish Award' in his honor. For many years the award was presented in person by his widow, Florence. In recognition Mrs. Parrish received the General Daniel James Jr. Distinguished Service/Achievement/Leadership Award at the 2010 convention.

Historians generally give credit to Colonel Noel Parrish, Commander of Tuskegee Field from 1942 to 1946, for his enlightened leadership and fair treatment of cadets which improved morale by reducing the amount of segregation and overcrowding and improving relations with both blacks and whites in the town of Tuskegee. The record of the Airmen became a driving force for President Harry S Truman's decision to desegregate the U.S. military in 1948.

== See also ==
- 92nd Infantry Division
- 93rd Infantry Division
- 555th Parachute Infantry Battalion "Triple Nickel"
- 761st Tank Battalion
- 614th Tank Destroyer Battalion
- Aerial warfare
- Bessie Coleman
- Executive Order 9981
- List of African American Medal of Honor recipients
- Military history of African Americans
- Red Ball Express
- Strategic bombing during World War II
- The Port Chicago 50
