= Marquis Calmes =

American general (1755–1834)

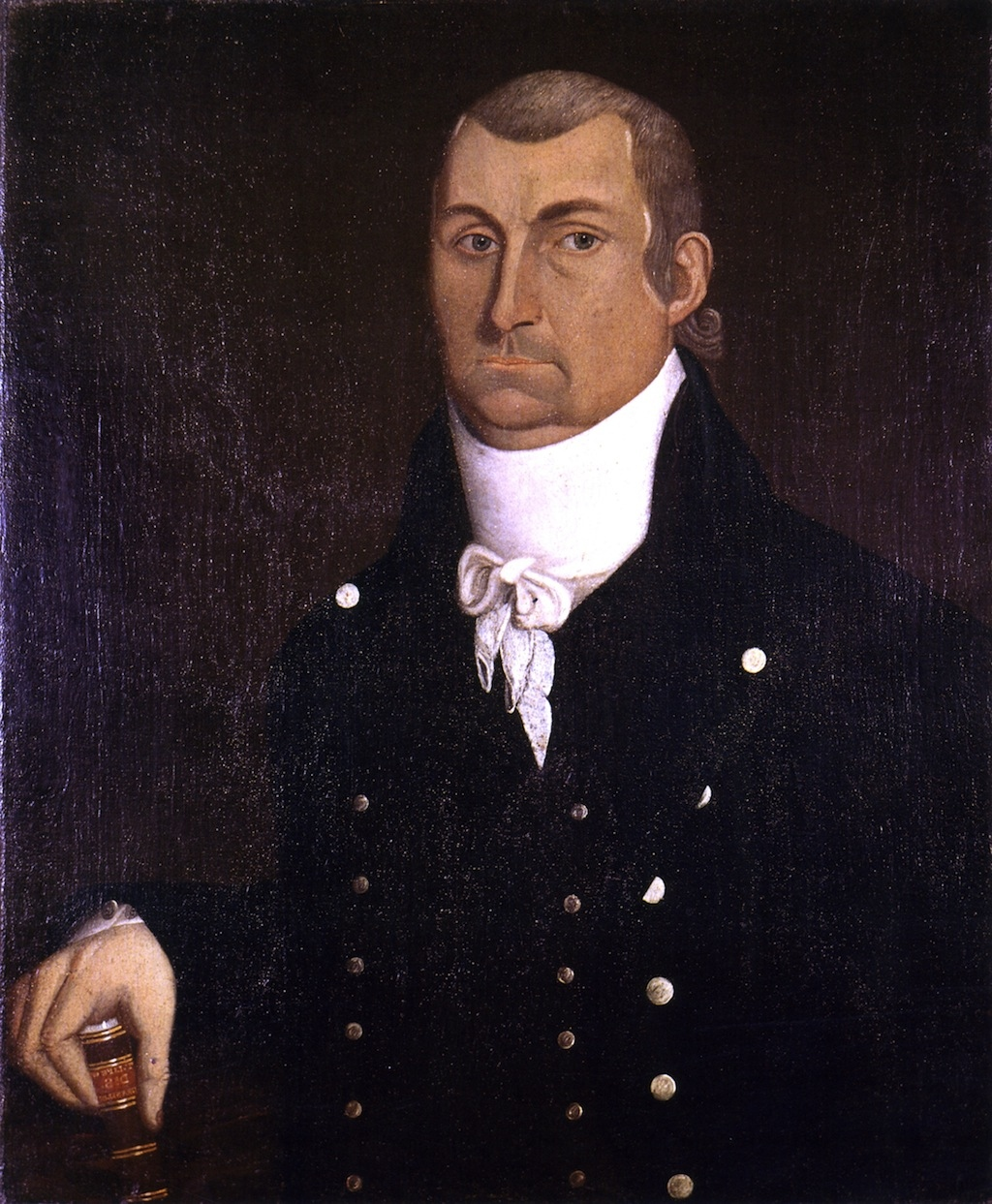
- Calmes in 1806
- Born: 26 February 1755; Frederick, Virginia, British America
- Died: 27 February 1834 (aged 79); Versailles, Kentucky, U.S.
- Burial place: Versailles, Kentucky
- Spouse: Priscilla Heale (1759–1821)
- Military career
- Allegiance: United States
- Branch: American Continental Army
- Service years: 1776-1779 American Revolution; 1812-1813 War of 1812
- Rank: Captain; Brigadier General
- Units: 2nd Virginia Regiment; 1st Division Kentucky Cavalry
- Conflicts: American Revolutionary War: Battle of Brandywine; Battle of Germantown; Battle of Monmouth; War of 1812: Battle of the Thames
- Other work: Politician; General Assembly of Kentucky

Marquis Calmes IV (26 February 1755 – 27 February 1834) was an American military officer and landowner.

== Biography ==
Calmes was of Huguenot ancestry. His father was William Waller Calmes, 1727–1773. Calmes' mother was Lucy Neville. Calmes' patrilineal grandfather was Marquis Guillame de Calmes II, who was born in France in 1705. The de Calmes were a Huguenot family from Trèbes who emigrated to the Colony of Virginia in the early 18th century.

Calmes was born 26 February 1755 in Frederick, Virginia. As a young man, he was sent abroad to be educated. When the American Revolution started, he returned to Virginia. He raised and equipped a company at his own expense, and joined the 2nd Virginia Regiment as a lieutenant.

At the Battle of Brandywine, Colonel Thomas Marshall, the commander of the Second Regiment, was seriously injured. Calmes replaced Marshall at the battle. Calmes was then promoted to captain.

Calmes served in the Second Regiment until the conclusion of his term of service in 1779. He married Priscilla Heale in Faquier in 1782. He left Virginia and made his way to Kentucky, where he eventually founded a plantation, Caneland, adjacent to Colonel Marshall's Buck Pond, in Woodford County, Kentucky. Calmes was one of the founders of Versailles, Kentucky. He married Priscilla Hale. At Caneland, Calmes enslaved multiple people, including field laborers, a sawyer, a carpenter, a blacksmith, and a shoemaker.

Calmes was a longtime member of the county court in Versailles. In 1795, he served in the Kentucky State Legislature.

During the War of 1812, Calmes was promoted to Brigadier General and given command of a brigade of Kentucky riflemen. He served under William Henry Harrison.

Following the War of 1812, Calmes returned again to his estate near Versailles, Kentucky. He was widowed in 1821, and afterwards embarked on a lengthy hunting trip in Arkansas. He also briefly hosted the Marquis de Lafayette, who he had befriended during the Revolutionary War, on the latter's American tour in 1825. He died on February 27, 1834. He is buried in a plain stone mausoleum on the property of Caneland. It was restored in 1990.

Calmes and his wife and children were painted by Jacob Frymire in 1806.
