= Stephen S. Sawyer =

American commercial illustrator (born 1952)

Stephen Shelby Sawyer (born August 30, 1952, in Paris, Kentucky, U.S.) is an American commercial illustrator known for his Christianist depictions of Jesus Christ, as well as for his business, Art 4 God. His work has been profiled in magazines, over 400 newspapers including The New York Times, and TV shows such as The Today Show. Since 1995, Sawyer has traveled as a motivational speaker throughout the United States and occasionally to other countries. He resides in Versailles, Kentucky.
