= Virginia Cary Hudson =

American novelist

Virginia Cary Hudson (May 28, 1894 – April 8, 1954) was a New York Times bestselling writer from Kentucky. As a 10-year-old in Versailles, Kentucky, she wrote a series of charming essays that were kept in a scrapbook by her mother, Jessie Gregory Hudson. Her daughter Virginia Cleveland Mayne copied the essays in the spring of 1952 before a disastrous attic fire destroyed the originals in October 1952. Virginia succeeded in publishing the essays with the Macmillan Company as O Ye Jigs and Juleps! The book reached the New York Times Bestseller List for 66 weeks and sold over a million copies.

== Early childhood and education ==
Virginia Cary Hudson was born in Versailles, Kentucky. She attended Margaret Hall School in Versailles, Kentucky, as well as the Bristol School in Washington, D.C. Both were Episcopal church schools for girls.

== Personal life ==
Hudson married Kirtley S. Cleveland on May 7, 1914, in Versailles. They had three children: Virginia, Ann, and Richard. Virginia and Kirtley first lived in Versailles and then in Louisville. In 1938, they took up residence at 1453 St. James Court, in a house designed by George Tachau. Virginia served as secretary and treasurer and then president of the St. James Court Association.

Hudson visited her mother's hometown of Cloverport often. Her father, Richard N. Hudson, President of the Louisville, Henderson & St. Louis Railway, built a country home near there overlooking the Ohio river. He and Jessie Gregory Hudson lived in Versailles, then moved to Cloverport, and kept a residence in Louisville as well. Richard N. Hudson died on January 25, 1937, during the Great Flood and Jessie died five years later on January 22, 1942. Kirtley was an owner and trainer of thoroughbred horses, and Virginia traveled with him to racetracks in North America, Cuba, and Mexico.

At home, Hudson was a feisty president of the St. James Court Association who solved the problem of people parking on the center green by letting the air out of their tires in the dead of night."

== Writer ==
Hudson gave talks to the Women's Auxiliary at Calvary Episcopal Church, to adult Sunday classes, and to other women's groups in Louisville. She also preached at the Goodwill Chapel and the Salvation Army Chapel in Louisville. She always wrote out the text of what she wanted to say, a practice she developed as a child with the encouragement of one of her teachers. Thanks to that discipline, her effusive love of writing, and her daughter Virginia's care to preserve everything her mother wrote, extensive writings by Virginia are extant. The essays she had written when she was ten years old were published by Virginia Cleveland Mayne as O Ye Jigs & Juleps! The book became a nationwide bestseller in 1962. The essays include: Sacraments - "What you are doing and saying when other people are listening. What you are thinking is your business."; Etiquette at church; Gardening; Education - "What you learn in books, and nobody knows you know it but your teacher."; Everlasting life - "God gives it to you and you can't get rid of it."; Spring; The library; Personal appearance - "Looking the best you can for the money. If you're born pretty that helps also."; An afternoon's stroll; China and religion. 14 editions of the book were published between 1962 and 1996 in English and are held by 1,326 libraries worldwide. They were a charming ten-year-old girl's interpretation of religion, education, spring, and a variety of other topics. A Swiss German translation as Respektlose Betrachtungen eines aufgeweckten Kleinstadtmädchens aus dem Amerika der Jahrhundertwende was published in 1968, and a Dutch edition, O gij polka's en perendrups in 1963. A musical, O Ye Jigs and Juleps: a play with music by Don Musselman, was published in 1992 in English and is held by 6 libraries worldwide.

The title of the book is inspired by a traditional canticle, sung in English in Episcopal worship, the Benedicite omnia opera Domini. : "O ye children of men, Bless ye the Lord, Praise Him and Magnify Him Forever."

Hudson's daughter published three more books of her mother's writings: Credos & Quips (1964), held by 313 libraries worldwide; Flapdoodle, Trust & Obey (1966), a collection of Virginia's letters, held by 439 libraries worldwide; and Close Your Eyes When Praying (1968), lessons about the Bible and the people in it, from a woman's point of view. The book is held by 352 libraries worldwide.

Beverly Cary Mayne Kienzle, a granddaughter of Hudson who knew her grandmother and witnessed the journey to publication, has published the first ever biography of her grandmother, a detailed and illustrated account of Virginia's life that responds authoritatively to those who doubted Virginia's authenticity. The biography was published June 6, 2016, by iUniverse: Virginia Cary Hudson: The Jigs & Juleps! Girl: Her Life and Writings.

== Death ==
Virginia Cary Hudson died on April 8, 1954, and is buried in the Hudson family plot in Cloverport, Kentucky.

== Publications ==
- Hudson, Virginia Cary. 1962. O Ye Jigs & Juleps! New York: Macmillan.
- Hudson, Virginia Cary, Virginia Cleveland Mayne, Charles Langworthy Wallis, and Richard Rosenblum. 1966. Flapdoodle, Trust & Obey. New York: Harper & Row.
- Hudson, Virginia Cary, and Karla Kuskin. 1964. Credos & Quips. New York: Macmillan. "It is made up of the talks given before the author's Guild at the Calvary Episcopal Church in Louisville, Kentucky. The late Virginia Cary Hudson testified with high good humor to a lifetime in her faith. In her talks she shared her discoveries in church history and archaic credos. She spoke not as a scholar but as a delighted and absorbed worshipper. These are dotted with her memories of the rigorous training afforded candidates for confirmation in her youth. Her concluding prayer is a gusty exhortation to believe and be comforted. A short book, this should find a ready audience both within and without the circle of her own creed."
- Hudson, Virginia Cary. 1968. Close Your Eyes When Praying. New York: Harper & Row.
- Hudson, Virginia Cary, Hanny Fries, Peter Motram, and Virginia Cary Hudson. 1966. Virginia: Respektlose Betrachtungen eines aufgeweckten Kleinstadtmädchens aus dem Amerika der Jahrhundertwende. Bern: Benteli.
- Hudson, Virginia Cary. 1963. O gij polka's en perendrups. Amsterdam: Van Ditmar.
- Broadfield, Sim, Don Musselman, and Virginia Cary Hudson. 1992. O Ye Jigs and Juleps: a play with music: adapted from the book written by Virginia Cary Hudson. New Orleans, La: Anchorage Press.
- Beverly Mayne Kienzle, Virginia Cary Hudson, The Jigs & Juleps Girl!: Her Life and Writings. 2016.
