= Naval Station Guam =

Naval Station Guam may refer to:

- Naval Base Guam (1944–current), the main Naval installation on Apra Harbor and its various components
- Commander Naval Forces Marianas (1944–current), responsible for U.S. Naval activities in the region
- Joint Region Marianas (2009–current), naval region of the U.S. Navy that includes Guam and the Commonwealth of the Northern Mariana Islands
- Naval Air Station Agana (1944–1995)

== See also ==
- History of Guam
- American Naval governors of Guam
