= Versailles, Kentucky =

- City
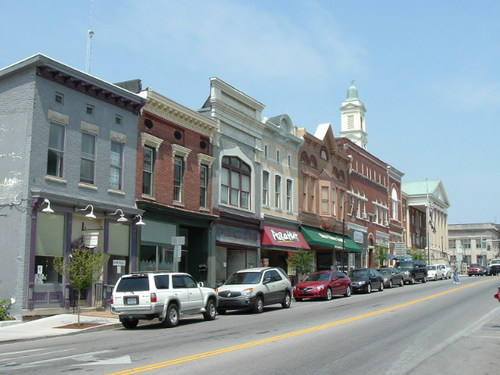
- Main Street
- Motto: "Proud to be a Kentucky Renaissance City"
- Location of Versailles in Woodford County, Kentucky.
- Coordinates: 38°3′10″N 84°43′49″W
- Country: United States
- State: Kentucky
- County: Woodford
- Established: June 24, 1794

Government
  - Type: Mayor-Council
  - Mayor: Laura Dake

Area
  - Total: 6.35 sq mi (16.44 km^{2})
  - Land: 6.31 sq mi (16.33 km^{2})
  - Water: 0.042 sq mi (0.11 km^{2})
- Elevation: 912 ft (278 m)

Population (2020)
  - Total: 10,347
  - Estimate (2022): 10,416
  - Density: 1,640.6/sq mi (633.44/km^{2})
- Time zone: UTC-5 (Eastern (EST))
  - Summer (DST): UTC-4 (EDT)
- ZIP codes: 40383, 40384, 40386
- Area code: 859
- FIPS code: 21-79482
- Website: versailles.klc.org

Versailles is a home rule-class city in Woodford County, Kentucky, United States. It lies 13 miles (21 kilometers) by road west of Lexington and is part of the Lexington-Fayette Metropolitan Statistical Area. Versailles has a population of 10,534 according to 2024 census estimates. It is the county seat of Woodford County. The city's name is pronounced /vərˈseɪlz/ vər-SAYLZ, an anglicization different from the French pronunciation of the royal city of the same name near Paris.

== History ==
Versailles was founded on June 23, 1792, on 80 acres (32 hectares) of land owned by Hezekiah Briscoe, who was, at the time, only a child. His guardian, Marquis Calmes, named the town after Versailles, France, in honor of General Lafayette, a family friend and hero of the American Revolution. Located in what became known as the Bluegrass region of Kentucky, where farmers also raised thoroughbred horses and other high-quality livestock, the city was officially incorporated on February 13, 1837. It was briefly occupied during the American Civil War by both Confederate and Union forces.

In 1870, black residents of Versailles took part in a demonstration against police violence after a white officer struck a black man with his pistol. Demonstrators formed armed pickets and guarded roads in and out of Versailles. Two of the leaders were subsequently lynched by a local militia company.

== Geography ==
According to the United States Census Bureau, the city has a total area of 2.8 square miles (7.3 km^{2}), all land.

== Demographics ==
Historical population
Census	Pop.	Note	%±
1800	172		—
1810	488		183.7%
1830	904		—
1840	1,044		15.5%
1860	1,142		—
1870	3,268		186.2%
1880	2,126		−34.9%
1900	2,337		—
1910	2,268		−3.0%
1920	2,056		−9.3%
1930	2,338		13.7%
1940	2,548		9.0%
1950	2,760		8.3%
1960	4,060		47.1%
1970	5,679		39.9%
1980	6,427		13.2%
1990	7,269		13.1%
2000	7,511		3.3%
2010	8,568		14.1%
2020	10,347		20.8%
2024 (est.)	10,656		3.0%
U.S. Decennial Census

=== 2020 census ===
As of the 2020 census, Versailles had a population of 10,347. The median age was 39.9 years. 24.7% of residents were under the age of 18 and 17.8% of residents were 65 years of age or older. For every 100 females there were 92.7 males, and for every 100 females age 18 and over there were 90.3 males age 18 and over.

98.2% of residents lived in urban areas, while 1.8% lived in rural areas.

There were 4,283 households in Versailles, of which 32.2% had children under the age of 18 living in them. Of all households, 43.4% were married-couple households, 17.6% were households with a male householder and no spouse or partner present, and 32.9% were households with a female householder and no spouse or partner present. About 30.8% of all households were made up of individuals and 13.1% had someone living alone who was 65 years of age or older.

There were 4,596 housing units, of which 6.8% were vacant. The homeowner vacancy rate was 1.5% and the rental vacancy rate was 5.3%.

Racial composition as of the 2020 census
Race	Number	Percent
White	8,112	78.4%
Black or African American	752	7.3%
American Indian and Alaska Native	44	0.4%
Asian	60	0.6%
Native Hawaiian and Other Pacific Islander	3	0.0%
Some other race	579	5.6%
Two or more races	797	7.7%
Hispanic or Latino (of any race)	1,134	11.0%

=== 2000 census ===
As of the census of 2000, there were 7,511 people, 3,160 households, and 2,110 families residing in the city. The population density was 2,668.7 people per square mile (1,030.4 people/km^{2}). There were 3,330 housing units at an average density of 1,183.2 units per square mile (456.8 units/km^{2}). The racial makeup of the city was 96.18% White, 0.67% African American, 0.15% Native American, 0.35% Asian, 0.01% Pacific Islander, 1.34% from other races, and 1.30% from two or more races. Hispanic or Latino of any race were 4.29% of the population.

There were 3,160 households, out of which 29.5% had children under the age of 18 living with them, 48.7% were married couples living together, 14.4% had a female householder with no husband present, and 33.2% were non-families. 28.4% of all households were made up of individuals, and 11.8% had someone living alone who was 65 years of age or older. The average household size was 2.37 and the average family size was 2.89.

23.2% of the population was under the age of 18, 10.1% from 18 to 24, 29.4% from 25 to 44, 23.7% from 45 to 64, and 13.6% who were 65 years of age or older. The median age was 37 years. For every 100 females, there were 88.6 males. For every 100 females age 18 and over, there were 86.8 males.

The median income for a household in the city was US $35,052, and the median income for a family was $41,567. Males had a median income of $31,056 versus $24,488 for females. The per capita income for the city was $18,489. About 11.1% of families and 14.0% of the population were below the poverty line, including 16.0% of those under age 18 and 20.9% of those age 65 or over.

== Economy ==
In the Inner Bluegrass Region, the area is a center for horse breeding and training, and for thoroughbred and standardbred racehorses and saddlebred pleasure horses.

Thoroughbred farms include Woodburn Stud, Lane's End Farm, and WinStar Farm.

Located in Versailles is Woodford Reserve Distillery, a station on the Bourbon Trail, and the Bluegrass Railroad and Museum.

=== Film industry ===
Most of the small-town scenes in the movie Elizabethtown (2005) were filmed in Versailles. It was also the setting of the movie Dreamer: Inspired by a True Story (2005). The cemetery scene in the film Secretariat (2010), about one of Kentucky's major race and stud horses, was filmed at Pisgah Pike Church. The movie Hometown Remedy (2023) was set in and filmed in Versailles. The Flim-Flam Man (1967) was filmed at several locations near Versailles. The opening sequence was filmed at Paynes Depot, and a car chase was filmed on Clifton Road.

== Education ==
Versailles has a lending library, a branch of the Woodford County Public Library.

== Notable people ==
- Jack Blackburn, professional boxer and trainer of Joe Louis
- Joseph Clay Stiles Blackburn, U.S. Congressman, U.S. Senator
- Ben Chandler, Kentucky Attorney General and U.S. Congressman
- Happy Chandler, Kentucky governor, U.S. senator and Commissioner of Baseball
- Martha Layne Collins, Kentucky governor
- John Conlee, country music singer
- John J. Crittenden, Kentucky governor, U.S. Congressman, senator, attorney general
- George Cruikshank, historian and editor of the Birmingham Ledger
- Owen Damm, soccer player
- Randall L. Gibson (1832–1892), politician born here, elected as US Representative and senator from Louisiana, serving from 1875 to 1892
- Field Harris (1895–1967), USMC general who served during World War II and the Korean War
- Virginia Cary Hudson (1894–1954), author
- Shaun King, writer and activist
- Robert K. Massie (1929–2019), American journalist and historian
- Simon Parmet (1897–1969), temporary resident, composer and conductor
- Noel F. Parrish USAF general
- Edward Platt, actor who played "The Chief" in Get Smart
- Stephen S. Sawyer, artist and writer
- Charles Scott, brigadier general during the American Revolution and fourth governor of Kentucky
- William Shatner, actor and Saddlebred owner
- Sturgill Simpson, singer and songwriter
- Kenny Troutt, owner of Excel Communications and Winstar Farm (part-time resident)
- Henry Ward, Kentucky Commissioner of Highways and Commissioner of State Parks
- Ernest E. West, raised in a Versailles orphanage, became a US Army soldier and was awarded the Medal of Honor
- Lane Rogers, adult-film star
