= Video games in New Zealand =

In New Zealand, 67% of the population plays video games, 46% of video game players are female and the average age of a video game player is 34. New Zealanders spend an average of 88 minutes a day playing video games.

As of 31 March 2020, the New Zealand video game development industry employed 747 full-time game developers and New Zealand studios earned $323.9 million in revenue, of which 96% came from international audiences. In addition, New Zealand consumers spent $501.4m on video games in 2019. Despite the difference in population size, New Zealand game development is comparable to Australia's, in terms of revenue and employment.

Industry bodies for video games in New Zealand include the New Zealand Game Developers Association, which supports video game developers, and the Interactive Games and Entertainment Association, which represents publishers and platforms.

== History ==
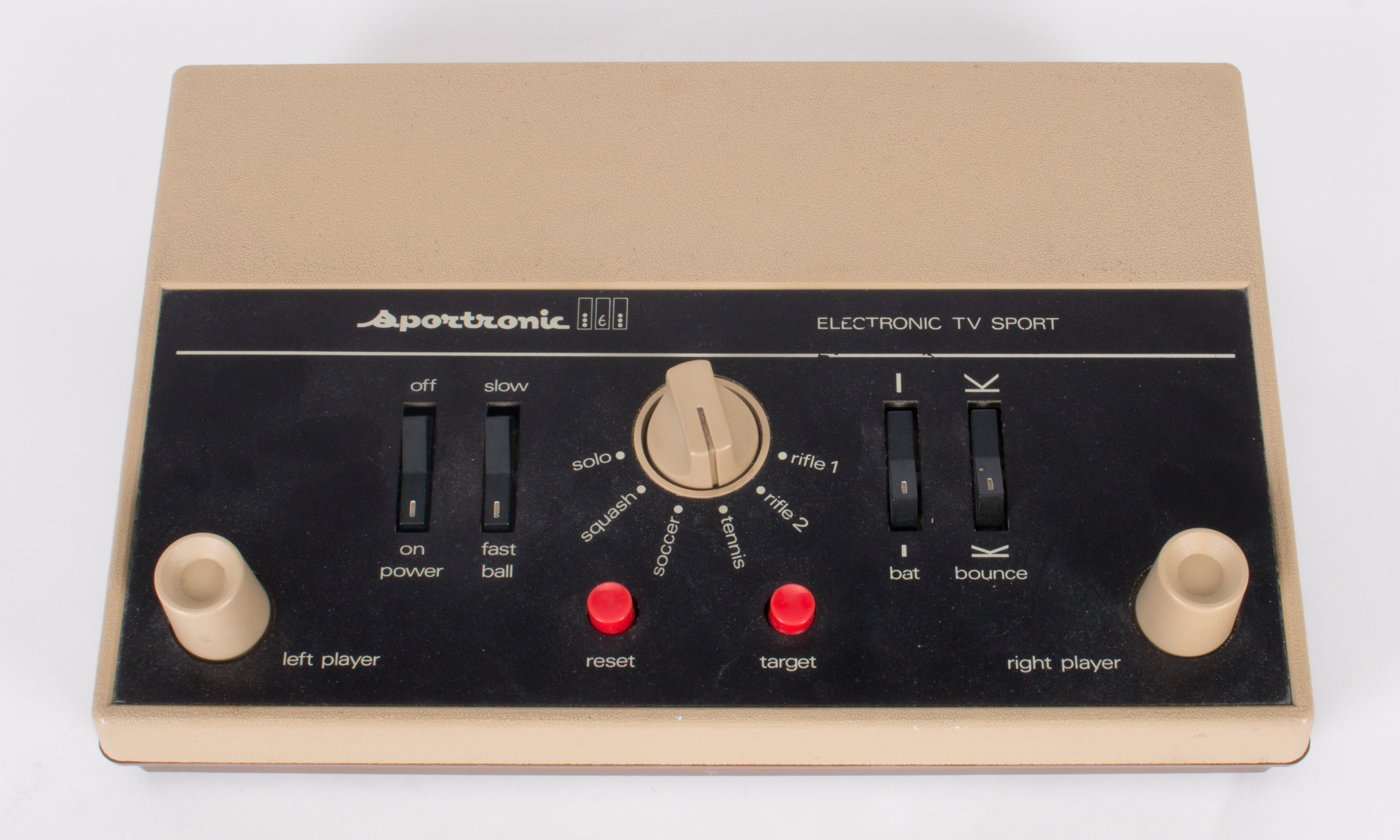
A Sportronic game console

New Zealand was an early adopter of the video game phenomenon, despite its remoteness. Many Atari 2600 titles were assembled under licence by Monaco Distributors in Auckland. New Zealand developed its own Pong-style game console, the Sportronic, in the late 1970s, as a result of import licensing laws.

The development of games in New Zealand was continued in the 1980s and 90s. Notable games include Laser Hawk, which was developed for Atari 8-bit computers in 1986 by Andrew Bradfield and Harvey Kong Tin, and Super Skidmarks, which was released for the Amiga in 1995 and was developed by Auckland-based company Acid Software.

== Major companies and global recognition ==
Although a minor player in the global video gaming industry, New Zealand has had success with homegrown game developers. PikPok, the largest game studio in New Zealand, have developed a number of sports games, including several titles in the Rugby League series. Dinosaur Polo Club developed Mini Metro. The action RPG Path of Exile, perhaps the best-known New Zealand game, was developed by Grinding Gear Games and released in 2013, enjoying international success. The video game series Bloons was made by the New Zealand company Ninja Kiwi.

The New Zealand Game Developers Association was formed in 2001 to support the development of games in New Zealand.

== Events and exhibitions ==
The New Zealand Game Developers Conference is held annually. The New Zealand Games Festival is held in Wellington around Easter each year and includes several events including the Play By Play conference and The Pavs, the New Zealand Games Awards. There are many regular Meetups in cities nationwide.

The Game Masters exhibition was held at the Museum of New Zealand Te Papa Tongarewa from 15 December 2012 through to 28 April 2013. The Arcade:Homegrown Video Games exhibition was held at Dowse Art Museum from 10 Nov 2012 – 24 Feb 2013 and then toured nationally.

== Independent scene ==
The rise of digital platforms has seen independent studios publish video games worldwide, including Rainbite and Screenshock Games, each consisting of developers trained at Media Design School in Auckland.

== Banned games ==
In 2003, Manhunt became the first video game officially banned in New Zealand. In 2004, Postal 2 and its demo were banned on the basis of gross and abhorrent content.

== Video Game Development ==
=== Game developers from New Zealand ===
- A44 Games
- Balancing Monkey Games
- Beyond Studio (AR/VR games)
- Black Salt Games
  - Disc 2 Games Limited (Also publisher)
- Camshaft Software LTD
- Code Force Limited
- Cosmink
- Eat Pant Games
- Hyporeal Ltd
- Indefatigable
- Metia Interactive
- Morepork Games
- Mune Studio
- Niantic Aotearoa (Ex-NZXR in 2020-2022)
- Pushlab Games Limited
- RageQuit Studios (Not the same as Polish developer Rage Quit Games)
- Rainbite
- retna studios
- RiffRaff Games (Prior name 'Studio Mayday' 2019 till 2022)
- Shoggoth Games
- Snickerdoodle Games (Puzzle games)
- StaplesVR (AR/VR experiences, training & games; apps)
- Stormcloak Games
- Trigger Happy Interactive
- Weathership Ltd
- Wētā Workshop (Game studio)

==== Misc Games ====
- 2UP Games (Mobile games. Investment from Supercell.)
- CerebralFix Limited (Mobile, online & VR/AR games; apps; art co-production)
- DOTDOT Studio (US HQ. VR/AR, games.)
- GEO AR Games (AR games)
- Grinding Gear Games (Online games)
- Mad Carnival Games (Founded by co-founder of Method Studios & M-Theory. Family friendly games.)
- Media Design School (Educational institution with game developments)
- Method Studios (Interactive entertainment, AR/VR, motion control games)
- Mighty Eyes (Merger of M-Theory & Oddboy. AR/VR games.)
  - M-Theory (AR/VR, games, apps. Setup by founders of Method Studios.)
  - Oddboy (AR/VR games & experiences)
- RUSH Digital Interactive (Interactive experiences, imagery, AI, UI design, apps. No games.)
- Scarlet City Studios (Online game)
- Swibo Ltd (Fitness technology)

==== Co-Development Services ====
- Blind Squirrel Entertainment, Inc. (Parent org)
  - Blind Squirrel Games (US HQ. Co-dev, ports, remasters. Also publisher & dev.)
- InGame (Interactive training, edutainment, VR sims, film & TV transmedia, gamification)
- Prismatic Studios (Unreal Engine co-development)
- Second Intention Limited (Code polish, art production. Contractor with Guerrilla Games since 2009.)
- Space Rock Games (NZ HQ. Coding, VFX, animation. Remasters, ports. Also publisher & dev.)

==== Defunct video game developers of New Zealand ====
- AlphaSim (Founded 1999. Defunct 2010. Sim addons dev.)
- ARA Journeys (Mobile AR games & apps. Founded 2018. Defunct 2025.)
- Starcolt Studios Ltd (Founded 2018. Probably defunct in 2022.)
- Stickmen Studios (Founded 2006. Absorbed into CerebralFix Limited in 2016. Online games.)
- Straylight Studios (Founded 2004. Defunct 2009. Edutainment.)

=== Video game publishers of New Zealand ===
- Bandai Namco Entertainment NZ
- Fiveight Distribution Ltd (NZ distributor for big brands of video games & accessories)
- Hellforge Studios
- JaffaJam (Mobile games)
- Maple Whispering Limited (HK HQ. Publisher, localizer.)
- MYTONA (Singaporean. NZ office.)
- Prodigy Design Limited (Holding group)
  - PikPok
  - Sidhe Interactive
- Synty Studios (Art assets publisher)

==== Publisher & developer firms ====
- Astronaut Diaries Limited
- Atawhai Interactive
- Atorcoppe Games
- Banana Hardsoft
- Bardsley Creative
- Blackout Games (Aka. Blackout Sports Limited)
- Catobyte Ltd (Casual games)
- Cloak and Dagger Games (Based in UK. Remote work.)
- Cloudfire Studios
- Dead Teapot (Setup by ex-Dinosaur Polo Club staff)
- Delphinium Games
- Deep Field Games
- Digital Confectioners (Online games)
- Dinosaur Polo Club
- Dry Cactus Games
- ENDESGA
- Esenthel (Open-source engine creation)
- Flightless Studios
- Gaugepunk Games (VR & sim games)
- Hashbane Interactive
- Irreflex Studios
- It's Anecdotal
- KraiSoft Entertainment (Casual games. Former HQ in USA (1998-2020).)
- Kreg (Online games)
- Lighstromo Studios (Core games, edu-games, mobile apps)
- Liquid Donkey Games
- Liquid Static Studio Limited (Also co-dev. Games, XR, VFX, tools.)
- Luminous Games
- Mainframe Games (Not the same as Nordic dev 'Mainframe Industries')
- Majic Jungle
- Many Worlds Limited (AR/VR, MR, app, web & games development. Also co-devs.)
- Mecha Weka (NZ HQ)
- Mental Drink Ltd
- Ninja Kiwi
- Outerdawn (Prior name 'Artrix' in 2014 till 2020)
- Phat Loot Studios (Online games)
- PLECTRUM SOFT (Aka Plectrum XR. VR.)
- Rexoto Games
- Rocket Jump Games (Mobile games)
- RocketWerkz (Founder)
- Runaway Play (Mobile games)
- SciViewLearn (Edutainment)
- Sky Bear Games
- Space Crab Labs
- Spotted Kiwi Interactive (Online games)
- Thousand Tonic
- Tiny Kiwi Games
- Unclear Games (HQ)
- Undermog Games
- Usual Suspects Studios
- Wicked Art Studios
- Wildboy Studios
- XR Games (UK HQ. VR.)
- [SAMPLE TEXT] Studios ltd

==== Defunct game publishers of New Zealand ====
- Acid Software (Founded 1990. Defunct 2001. Dev. Former publisher & distributor. Subsidiary of NZ software firm, Armstrong Communications Limited.)
- Little Lost Fox Limited (Publisher & dev: mobile game. Founded 2017. Defunct 2025.)
- Monaco Corporation (NZ distributor of electronics & video games from big brands. Founded 1978. Ceased games operations in 2011.)
- Poseidon Software (Publisher & dev of software & video games. Founded 1984? Inactive after 1988?)
- Vision Software, Inc. (Founded 1988. Inactive after 1997. Ex-Art Computer Software in 1989-1991. Publisher, dev & former porting.)
