= Bloons TD 6 =

2018 video game

- Bloons TD 6 banner
- Developer: Ninja Kiwi
- Publisher: Ninja Kiwi (Note: Netflix Games version published by Netflix)
- Series: Bloons TD
- Engine: Unity
- Platforms: Android; iOS; macOS; Windows; visionOS; Xbox One; PlayStation 4; Nintendo Switch
- Release: Android, iOS; June 13, 2018; Windows; December 17, 2018; macOS; March 13, 2020; Apple Arcade; February 11, 2022; Xbox One; September 5, 2023; visionOS; February 2, 2024; PlayStation 4; July 31, 2024; Nintendo Switch; June 18, 2026
- Genre: Tower defense
- Modes: Single-player, multiplayer

Bloons TD 6 is a 2018 tower defense game developed and published by Ninja Kiwi and created in Unity. In Bloons TD 6, various monkeys are placed around the map to defend against "Bloons" that are traveling towards the exit. Being the sixth and latest entry in the Bloons Tower Defense series, it first released on June 13, 2018, for iOS and Android. It was later released on Microsoft Windows in December 2018, and macOS in March 2020 via Steam. In February 2022, Bloons TD 6+ was released for Apple Arcade on both iOS and macOS. It was later released on the Epic Games Store on June 19, 2022. On June 12, 2023, Bloons TD 6 Netflix was released on iOS and Android for Netflix members only. Bloons TD 6 was released for the Apple Vision Pro on February 2, 2024. Bloons TD 6 has releases for consoles, starting with Xbox One on September 5, 2023, PlayStation 4 on July 31, 2024, and Nintendo Switch on June 18, 2026. The mobile version was praised by critics and is considered to be one of the best mobile games of all time.

== Gameplay ==
As a tower defense game, Bloons TD 6 (Bloons Tower Defense 6) sees the player using monkeys and other defenses to defend against incoming Bloons.

Bloons TD 6 is a 3D tower defense game played from a birdseye perspective, as opposed to the 2D perspective of previous Bloons Tower Defense games. The game can be played either solo or in co-op mode with up to four players.

The main gameplay consists of using several variants of monkeys, structures, and traps, collectively known as "towers", in order to prevent enemies known as "Bloons" from reaching an exit. Bloons TD 6 introduces a new category of towers, known as "heroes", which level up and become stronger over time, or through the player using in-game money. Towers can pop Bloons or provide support in the form of slowing them down, knocking them back, or boosting the power of other towers. When popped, Bloons grant the player money, which can be used to purchase additional towers or upgrade existing ones. Towers can be upgraded to gain access to stronger attacks or support, up to five times in one path, and 2 in another. The player does not start out with all of the upgrades unlocked; instead, they earn the upgrades by leveling up the towers via XP which can be earned per round (separate from Hero XP). Additionally, there is an in-game currency known as "Monkey Money"—which can be earned or purchased with micro-transactions—which can buy heroes, separate one-time use "powers" that can support towers, "continues" which allow the player to continue if they have lost a round, and more.

Bloons spawn in several waves, and travel along a predetermined path. Sets of waves are separated into rounds, each of which consists of a set amount of Bloons, which over time become stronger and may have properties resistant to certain effects, such as explosions, ice, or magic, with some being immune to more than one. Some rounds may have a different set amount of Bloons depending on what game mode the player initially chose. The largest Bloons are referred to as "MOAB-class" Bloons, which are designed as zeppelins, and are harder to defeat as a result of increased health and sometimes has armor. If a Bloon gets through the player's defenses, the player loses lives, with stronger Bloons taking away more lives. If the player loses all their lives, the game ends. If the player can complete all the required rounds without losing all their lives, the player wins. After winning, the player has the option to exit directly back to the home screen, or go into an endless Freeplay mode. The game features multiple different maps, and can be played on several difficulty options. Some maps contain obstacles that will block towers' line of sight, preventing them from shooting at Bloons behind them, or do not allow for tower placement. Some obstacles can be removed with in-game cash.

The player can earn several in-game currencies through gameplay: "Cash" is obtainable at the end of each round, when popping Bloons, and through certain towers' abilities, and is used to upgrade towers. The aforementioned Monkey Money is rewarded for winning games, by completing challenges. "Monkey Knowledge Points" are granted throughout gameplay and can be used to permanently upgrade monkeys via a skill tree. "Trophies" are a rare type of currency only obtainable through weekly events, used to unlock cosmetics.

Boss Events are a type of special event in the game, first introduced in Bloons Monkey City. In these events, players must prepare for a Boss Bloon, a very powerful MOAB-class Bloon with large amounts of health. The boss appears once every 20 rounds, starting at round 40, and has different abilities that may hinder towers' abilities, boost its and other Bloons' properties, or spawn more Bloons. There are multiple different bosses, with special event modifiers exclusive to bosses, differing maps to fight them on, and rulesets determining how much harder or easier a boss event will be.

Paragons, the first of which being introduced in the same update as bosses, are more powerful final upgrades to a particular tower. They require one of each tier 5 variant of a tower to purchase, and will sacrifice all other towers of its type. They typically have a higher cost than most base towers within the game.

In Rogue legends, the first paid DLC, the type of game is shifted from a Tower Defense to a Roguelike on a map with hexagonal tiles. Throughout the map there are chests, merchants, mini games and mini bosses that give you artifacts. These artifacts give special properties, such as increased attack speed, increased Bloons speed, or a Permafrost effect on Dart Monkey darts. At the end of each stage, there is a boss tile, where the player can use collected artifacts and monkeys to fight a Boss Bloon. Upon defeating the Boss Bloon, the player will get the choice of a special artifact or high-level Monkeys. In each campaign, there are 4 stages.

== History ==
Bloons TD 6 was first announced on PRLog on March 28, 2017, and it was initially aimed to be released in 2017. According to the same article posted on PRLog, an "extensive balance and test period" was required due to the "immense scale and strategic depth of the game".

The game was released on the iOS App Store and the Google Play Store on June 14, 2018. A Microsoft Windows version was released through Steam on December 17, 2018. Unlike earlier games of the series, Bloons TD 6 is the first game in the Bloons TD series that does not have a Flash counterpart.

On February 11, 2022, Bloons TD 6 was released on Apple Arcade as Bloons TD 6+. Bloons TD 6 was released on the Epic Store in December 2022. Netflix has announced a third-party version of Bloons TD 6, releasing for June 21, 2023 for iOS and Android. An Xbox One port released on September 5, 2023, followed by a PlayStation 4 port on July 31, 2024, and a Nintendo Switch port on June 18, 2026.

Mixed reality features for visionOS became available through Apple Arcade with the release of the Apple Vision Pro headset on February 2, 2024.

On February 4, 2025, Rogue Legends became available, a paid expansion accessible via in-app-purchase that incorporates roguelike mechanics into gameplay.

On December 3, 2025, a story-driven paid expansion, Frontier Legends, was released as a paid DLC.

On November 21, 2025, a vampire survivors inspired spinoff titled Bloons Blitz was announced, which was released on September 30, 2026.

== Reception ==
Bloons TD 6 received mostly positive reviews from critics. New Zealand Game Developers Association secretary Stephen Knightly praised the depth of the gameplay in Bloons TD 6, specifically the visual appeal to a general audience and the level of complexity for more experienced players: "It's fun and friendly, so it's accessible, but under the surface it's quite complicated". Although praise was given for its extended gameplay variety, it was also criticized for its lack of replayability. Because Bloons TD 6 is a paid app featuring in-app purchases that may be used to unlock certain features in the game faster, some critics argue that the game feels like it runs on a freemium model.

Harry Slater from Pocket Gamer describes the core gameplay as being too reliant on the mechanics of older games in the series, which he claims doesn't provide enough impact for players wanting to play the game long-term. On the other hand, Dennis Zirkler from GameStar believes there is a sufficient amount of content in the game to sustain a variety of different playstyles while still keeping the diversity of the core gameplay, and says the presence of in-app purchases in a paid game are completely optional for this game and make little impact on the overall enjoyment of the entire game. Although he criticizes the need to play the game repeatedly to access unlockable features, he praises the inclusion of "CHIMPS", a game mode where most unlockable (and all paid) features are restricted and subsequently limits players to focus on the underlying concept of creating the optimal tower combinations in each stage of the game. Nathan Snow from The Spectrum said that while being repetitive after a while, the game sticks to a proven concept of the Bloons series.

The cartoonish visuals used in the game were praised for its appeal for a wider audience, particularly through combination of playability and complexity. Critics have noted the use of characterization of towers and long-term success of the predecessor Bloons TD games as factors to the success of Bloons TD 6. Note was taken about the complexity of the game and the game mechanics accompanied with the game; PCGamesN describes the complexity of Bloons TD 6 to be given a "whole new plane of addiction" when it comes to integrating the highlighted focus of interacting monkey characters with the main gameplay, while other critics state that the implementation of such features may feel too childish or otherwise make the game appear too generic or dependent on microtransactions.

The business model for Bloons TD 6 has received mixed reviews. Simon Hill from Wired perceives the business model of the game to take into account both the premium market and the freemium market: "It's a premium game that fully justifies the price of entry, but it also offers a wide range of microtransactions that includes the usual cosmetic upgrades, gameplay boosts, and unlimited access to special events." He also praises the balance of replayability with complexity, mainly through the deepened progression and development of strategy in a tower defense context. Further attention has been pointed towards the conventional mobile market, which generally relies on the freemium model as the primary source of income, and pointed out that Bloons TD 6 lacks third-party advertisements but varies use of optional in-app purchases in the game. Others are more critical and negative on the business model for Bloons TD 6. One critic from MetaCritic argues that the game has an overwhelming amount of content that lack sufficient replayability and uses a dubious mix of premium and freemium marketing styles.

=== Sales ===
BTD6 topped as the best-selling app within the first week of release. It now receives over 10,000 constant players on average for any given moment on Steam, being the largest Bloons game in the franchise by far. According to Catherine Harris from Stuff.co.nz, Bloons TD 6 consistently reaches among the top-selling paid apps in the world, including the "world's most-bought paid app" in 2018. She argues that the success of this game among other Ninja Kiwi apps has helped shaped the success of New Zealand's gaming industry. Dustin Bailey from PCGamesN noted the increased popularity of the Steam version of Bloons TD 6 and the greater appearance of the game on Twitch. He attributed further success of the game by both the discounted US$1 price on the Steam version and its nostalgic factor for players who had previously played the older Flash games in the Bloons TD series.

Kotaku noted that New Zealand's gaming industry revenue surpassed that of Australia's gaming industry in 2019, with one of the main sources being from Bloons TD 6, the others being Path of Exile by Grinding Gear Games and Valleys Between by Little Lost Fox.

=== Legacy ===
The game regularly receives updates that include constant balance changes and additional content. As of October 8, 2026, there have been 57 major updates added to the game. Ben "RidiculousHat" Goodman from PC Gamer praises the continuous development of Bloons TD 6, which regularly refines the balance in the game through updates to promote a variety of gameplay.

The success of the Bloons TD franchise had been given praise by digital investment company Modern Times Group, with special note on Ninja Kiwi's continuous work to "pioneer" the tower defense genre in an economically viable but quality format.
