= Video games in Australia =

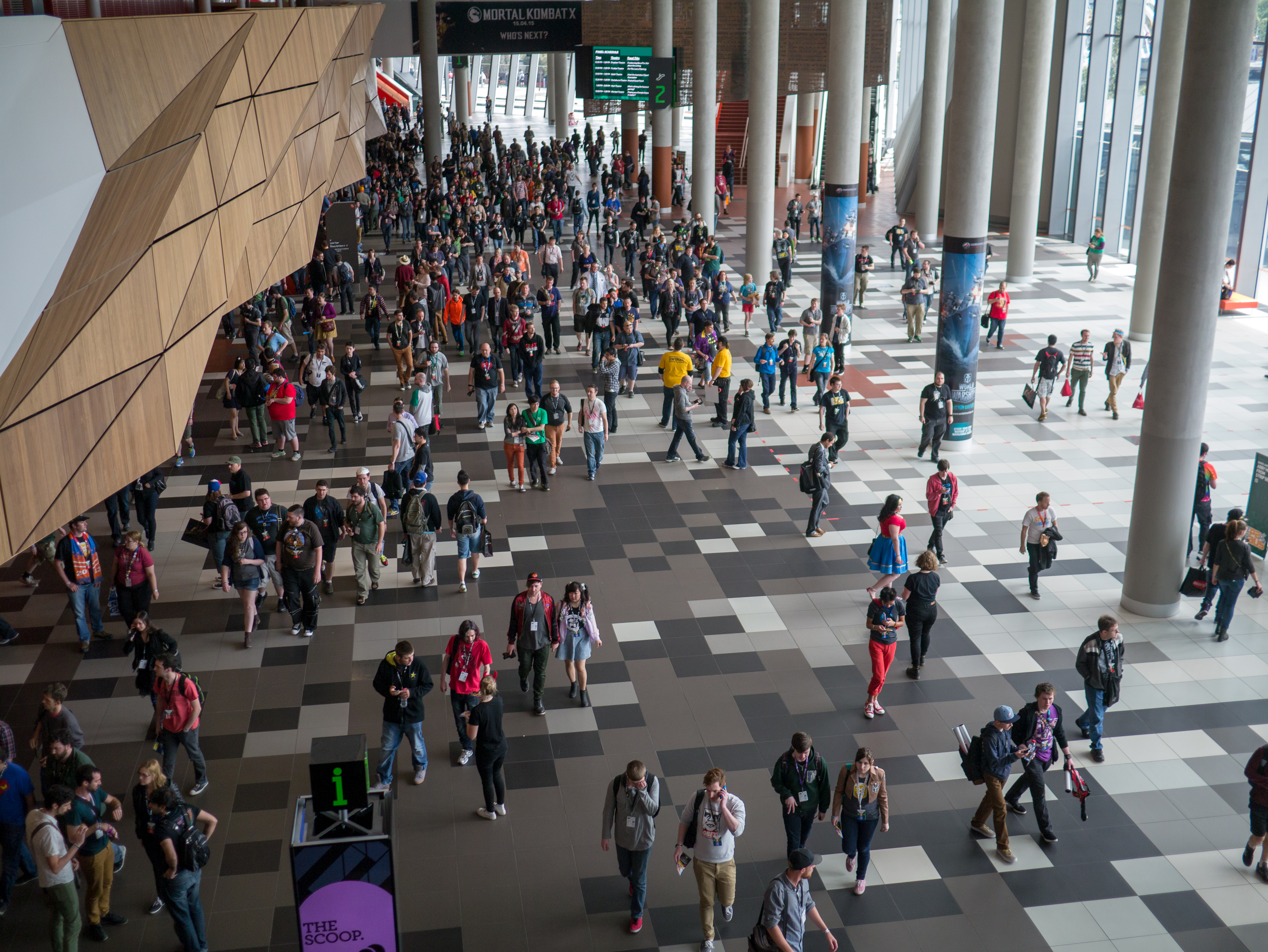
Convention floor at PAX Australia 2014

The video game industry in Australia is worth $4.21 billion annually as of 2022, inclusive of traditional retail and digital sales. A report in 2022 by Austrade estimated that 3,228 Australians worked in the video game industry. In the fiscal year 2016–17, revenue from Australian game developers was approximately $118.5 million, 80 percent of which was from overseas sales.

Video game retailers in Australia include EB Games Australia, JB Hi-Fi, Gametraders and The Gamesmen. Video games are also sold at department stores like Big W and Target Australia.

== History ==
The Gamesmen, an Australian video game retailer, was established in 1982. They were the first retailer to sell video games online in Australia when they launched their website on 18 July 1996.

Beam Software was one of the first Australian game development studios to achieve global success, with a text adventure adaptation of The Hobbit released in 1982 for the ZX Spectrum. The company went on to produce other successful titles including The Way of the Exploding Fist for Commodore 64 in 1985 and Le Mans for the SEGA Dreamcast in 2001. Ozisoft, a major distributor of games, was established in 1982.

Other early game development studios in Australia include SSG, who developed Reach for the Stars in 1983, and Micro Forté, founded by John De Margheriti in 1985.

In 1990, the Australian video game market generated an annual revenue of $300,000,000 (equivalent to $739,000,000 in 2025), with arcade video games generating $200 million and home consumer games generating $100 million.

John De Margheriti later established the Academy of Interactive Entertainment (AIE) in 1996 and founded the Game Developers Association of Australia (GDAA) in 1999. The first president of the GDAA was Adam Lancman, who had previously worked at Beam Software.

The Game Wizards, an Australian video game retailer, was established in 1990. It was the second retailer to sell games online in Australia when it set up its website in 1997. In 2007, the company's 22 stores were acquired by GAME and re-branded. By 2009 GAME Australia had expanded to over 100 stores.

EB Games entered the market as a video game retailer in 1997.

The real-time strategy game Dark Reign: The Future of War, developed by Queensland-based Auran, achieved widespread critical and commercial success upon its release in 1997.

Between 1999 and 2002, the top five best-selling games in Australia were Pokémon games. The series had sold over 1.6 million units in Australia by 2002.

A research report published by the association in 2005 found that 76 per cent of households had a device for playing video games, 38 per cent of gamers were female and the average age of a gamer was 24.

In 2005, the top three games by units sold were Gran Turismo 4, GTA: San Andreas and Pokémon Emerald. The most popular game genres were strategy, adventure and action.

Team Bondi, a Sydney-based independent third-party game developer, was founded in 2003. The studio was responsible for the Microsoft Windows, Xbox 360 and PlayStation 3 title L.A. Noire, published by multinational video game developer and publisher Rockstar Games (also popular for the Grand Theft Auto series). L.A. Noire was both a critical and commercial success, with over 5 million sales. Despite this, Team Bondi was in massive debt before and after the launch of L.A. Noire and the company wound up on 5 October 2011.

Between 2005 and 2015, a number of other large studios operating in Australia shut down including KMM Brisbane, Pandemic Studios, Krome Studios, THQ, Visceral Games and 2K Australia.

During the same period, smaller game developers were having success with mobile games. In 2010, Halfbrick, a studio based in Brisbane, released Fruit Ninja which has since been downloaded over a billion times. Other notable mobile games developed in Australia include Crossy Road and Framed. In October 2015, half of the top 10 mobile games in the App Store were Australian made.

EB Games held the first EB Expo video game convention at the Gold Coast Convention and Exhibition Centre in 2011. The expo was attended by over 10,000 people. The expo moved to the Sydney Showground for 2012 and was held there annually until the expo returned to the Gold Coast in 2017. 36,750 people attended the expo in 2015.

At PAX Prime 2012, it was announced that PAX would expand internationally to Australia. PAX Australia was held for the first time in 2013 at the Melbourne Showgrounds. The annual event remains the only PAX event held outside of the United States.

On 14 May 2012 GAME, which had since downsized to 26 stores, went into administration and subsequently closed down.

The Digital Australia 2012 report, published by the IGEA, found that female participation in video gaming had risen to 48 per cent and the average age of an Australian video gamer had hit 32. Traditional retail sales of video games in Australia during 2012 were $1.16 Billion; digital sales were estimated at $620 Million.

In 2013, Australia was ranked 14th in the world in terms of video game revenues.

On 22 June 2015 the Australian Senate commenced an inquiry into the future of Australia's video game development industry. The subsequent report was tabled on 29 April 2016.

In 2021 the official Games for Change Asia-Pacific Festival launched with the help of local studio Chaos Theory Games. The flagship event was held from October 5–7th 2021 virtually and had keynote speakers such as Prof. Anantha Duraiappah, Noah Falstein, Vince Sui, Prof. Patrea Andersen and Prof. Jonathan Louis Duckworth.

== Trade bodies ==
The industry body for video games in Australia is the Interactive Games & Entertainment Association (IGEA). IGEA was formed in 2002 initially as the Interactive Entertainment Association of Australia (IEAA) as an industry association for publishers, distributors and marketers of video games. The IEAA was renamed to IGEA in 2009 to present more focus on video game entertainment.

The Game Developers Association of Australia (GDAA) supports video game development. Among its activities is organizing the annual Game Connect Asia Pacific (GCAP) conference.

On March 6, 2020, the GDAA members votes to allow IGEA to acquire all the assets of GDAA under the IGEA banner, which will include operations of GCAP.

== Censorship ==
Video games could not be designated an adults only or 18+ rating in Australia until 1 January 2013. An R18+ classification rating has been available for this purpose for other forms of media since the introduction of the Classification (Publications, Films and Computer Games) Act 1995. Prior to 1 January 2013, a video game that had content deemed unsuitable for persons under the age of 18 would be 'Refused Classification' by the Australian Classification Board (ACB) under this act. Classification of video games is mandatory in Australia and material refused classification is legally banned from sale, hire or import.

Notable video games that were refused classification by the ACB prior to the introduction of an R18+ for video games include: Duke Nukem 3D, Grand Theft Auto III, Grand Theft Auto: San Andreas, Left 4 Dead 2, Mortal Kombat (2011) and The House of the Dead: Overkill Extended Cut. Most of these games were subsequently modified by the publishers and later reclassified MA15+ and made available for sale in Australia. Although some games (GTA 3 and Mortal Kombat Komplete Edition) would be later rated R18+ uncut and The House of the Dead: Overkill was given an uncut MA15+ on appeal.

On 22 July 2011, the Standing Committee of Attorneys-General agreed in-principle to introduce legislation that would allow video games to be classified R18+. Amendments to the Classification (Publications, Films and Computer Games) Act 1995 came into effect on 1 January 2013 to allow video games to receive the adults only rating. Games that were refused classification prior to 1 January 2013 can be designated an R18+ rating and made available for sale in Australia if the publisher of the game applies for re-classification and pays a fee.

Games can still be refused classification and banned from sale if they "depict, express or otherwise deal with matters of sex, drug misuse or addiction, crime, cruelty, violence or revolting or abhorrent phenomena in such a way that they offend against the standards of morality, decency and propriety generally accepted by reasonable adults to the extent that they should not be classified", "describe or depict in a way that is likely to cause offence to a reasonable adult, a person who is, or appears to be, a child under 18 (whether the person is engaged in sexual activity or not)", or "promote, incite or instruct in matters of crime or violence".

Notable video games that have been refused classification since the introduction of the R18+ rating for video games include: Saints Row IV, South Park: The Stick of Truth, Hotline Miami 2: Wrong Number and Outlast 2.

Material which is refused classification is put on the Australian Customs and Border Protection Service list of prohibited items. Any copies of these games found at the border will be seized, and its recipient, depending on the number of copies being imported may receive up to AUD$110,000 in fines.

An individual is allowed to own, use, access or create Refused Classification items, including games (except in Western Australia and/or if they contain illegal content). But a Refused Classification rating means that the created item is illegal to sell, hire, advertise or import within Australia.

== See also ==
- Category:Video game companies of Australia
