= Technology in mental disorder treatment =

The use of electronic and communication technologies as a therapeutic aid to healthcare practices is commonly referred to as telemedicine or eHealth. The use of such technologies as a supplement to mainstream therapies for mental disorders is an emerging mental health treatment field which, it is argued, could improve the accessibility, effectiveness and affordability of mental health care. Mental health technologies used by professionals as an adjunct to mainstream clinical practices include email, SMS, virtual reality, computer programs, blogs, social networks, the telephone, video conferencing, computer games, instant messaging and podcasts.

== Specific technologies ==
Traditional methods of helping people with a mental health problem have been to use approaches such as medication, counselling, cognitive behavioral therapy (CBT), exercise and a healthy diet. New technology can also be used in conjunction with traditional methods.

=== Virtual reality ===
Rizzo et al. have used virtual reality (VR) (simulated real environments through digital media) to successfully treat post-traumatic stress disorder (PTSD). The VR system offers a sense of realism in a safe environment. By gradually exposing the person to their fear with a Virtual Environment the patient becomes accustomed to the trigger of their problem to an extent that it no longer becomes an issue. This form of treatment has also been applied to other mental health problems such as phobias (where anxiety is triggered by a certain situation). For example, fear of flying or arachnophobia (fear of spiders). Computer games have also been used to provide therapy for adolescents. Many adolescents are reluctant to have therapy and a computer game is a fun, anonymous and accessible way to receive therapeutic advice. An example of a computer game that provides such therapy is SPARX, which has notably been shown to be about as effective as face-to-face therapy in a clinical trial.

=== Mobile devices ===
Relatively new technology such as mobile phones have also been used to help people with mental health problems by providing timely information.

As technology improves, it may soon be possible for mobile phones or other devices to sense when people are changing state (e.g. entering a manic or a deeply depressed phase), for instance by noticing a change in voice pattern or usage frequency, or facial tension. It may also become possible to measure physical evidence of levels of distress and suffering, such as changes in hormones or adrenalin in blood, and changes in brain activity. Apps may also be able to predict high stress situations, based on location, time, activity (e.g. purchasing of alcohol) and nearby presence of high risk people. The technology could then send calming messages to patients, automatically alert carers and even automatically administer meds.

There are different technologies that are used in the mental health field over the past 30 years. "Mobile devices like cell phones, smartphones, and tablets are giving the public, doctors, and researchers new ways to access help, monitor progress, and increase understanding of mental wellbeing. New technology can also be packaged into an extremely sophisticated app for smartphones or tablets. Such apps might use the device's built-in sensors to collect information on a user's typical behavior patterns. If the app detects a change in behavior, it may provide a signal that help is needed before a crisis occurs" (Technology and the Future of Mental Health Treatment, n.d.). This connects to Quan-Haase reading about surveillance. The use of a mobile app that knows people behavior has private information about the people who use it. The people are being watched by the app creator or company. Functional view argues that societies, in order to operate effectively, require some element of security and safety. To achieve these goals, personal information in surveillance are only for a degree, not of kind. "This form of surveillance is harmless since third-party companies are primarily interested in aggregate data and will use this information for the purpose of developing and marketing better products, which will benefit consumers in the long run". (Quan-Haase, 2016, p. 222-223). There are many pros of using mental health app such as it is convenience, lower cost, and 24-hour service.

Technology companies are developing mobile-based artificial intelligence chatbot applications that use evidence-based techniques, such as cognitive behavioral therapy (CBT), to provide early intervention to support mental health and emotional well-being challenges. Artificial intelligence (AI) text-based conversational applications delivered securely and privately over mobile devices have the ability to scale globally and offer contextual and always-available support. A recent real world data evaluation study, published in the open access journal JMIR mHealth & uHealth, that used an AI-based emotionally intelligent mobile chatbot app, Wysa, identified a significantly higher average improvement in symptoms of depression and a higher proportion of positive in-app experience among the more engaged users of the app as compared to the less engaged users.

On 15 June 2020, the Food and Drug Administration approved the first video game treatment, a game for children aged 8–12 with certain types of ADHD called EndeavorRx. It can be downloaded with a prescription onto a mobile device, and is intended for use in tandem with other treatments. Patients play it for 30 minutes a day, 5 days a week, over a month-long treatment plan.

=== Technology and cognitive behavioral therapy ===
The development of mobile phone apps using cognitive behavioral therapy (CBT) has an increasing research area. Using the idea of cognitive behavioral therapy (CBT) apps, self-rated mental health (SRMH) situations can be implemented into these apps and used as information before seeing a professional. Recent research done with self-rated mental health (SRMH) involves survey research which is conducted by with a question that asks respondents to rate their overall mental or emotional health from poor to excellent. The research found with SRMH showed that 62% of people with a mental health problem rated themselves as having positive mental health. The respondents who rated their mental health as good when compared to those with poor mental health, had 30% lower odds of having a mental health problem at a follow-up. This research showcased that without treatment, people with a mental health problem did better if they perceived their mental health in a positive way by declaring a good overall mental or emotional health.

While studies have investigated the clinical efficacy of remote-, internet- and chatbot-based therapy, there are other factors, such as enjoyment and smoothness, that are important for evaluating therapy sessions. Research published in 2019 reported a comparative study of therapy sessions following the interaction of 10 participants with human therapists versus a chatbot (simulated using a Wizard of Oz protocol), finding evidence to suggest that when compared against a human therapist control, participants find chatbot-provided therapy less useful, less enjoyable, and their conversations less smooth (a key dimension of a positively-regarded therapy session).

A study suggests that combining cognitive behavioral therapy (CBT) with SlowMo, an app that helps people notice their "unhelpful fast-thinking" might be more effective for treating paranoia in people with psychosis than CBT alone.

== Effects and impact ==
=== Economic evaluations ===
From an economical perspective, digital interventions for mental health conditions seem to be cost-effective compared to no intervention or non-therapeutic responses such as monitoring. However, when compared to in-person therapy or medication their added value is currently uncertain.

== Ethical, legal and social issues ==
There is uncertainty around the ethical and legal implications of digital technologies in the mental health context, including the use of artificial intelligence, machine learning, deep learning, and other forms of automation. Ethical and legal issues tend to not be explicitly addressed in empirical studies on algorithmic and data-driven technologies in mental health initiatives. Concerns have been raised about the near-complete lack of involvement of mental health service users, the scant consideration of algorithmic accountability, and the potential for overmedicalization and techno-solutionism.
