= Maru Nihoniho =

New Zealand video game developer

Maru Nihoniho MNZM
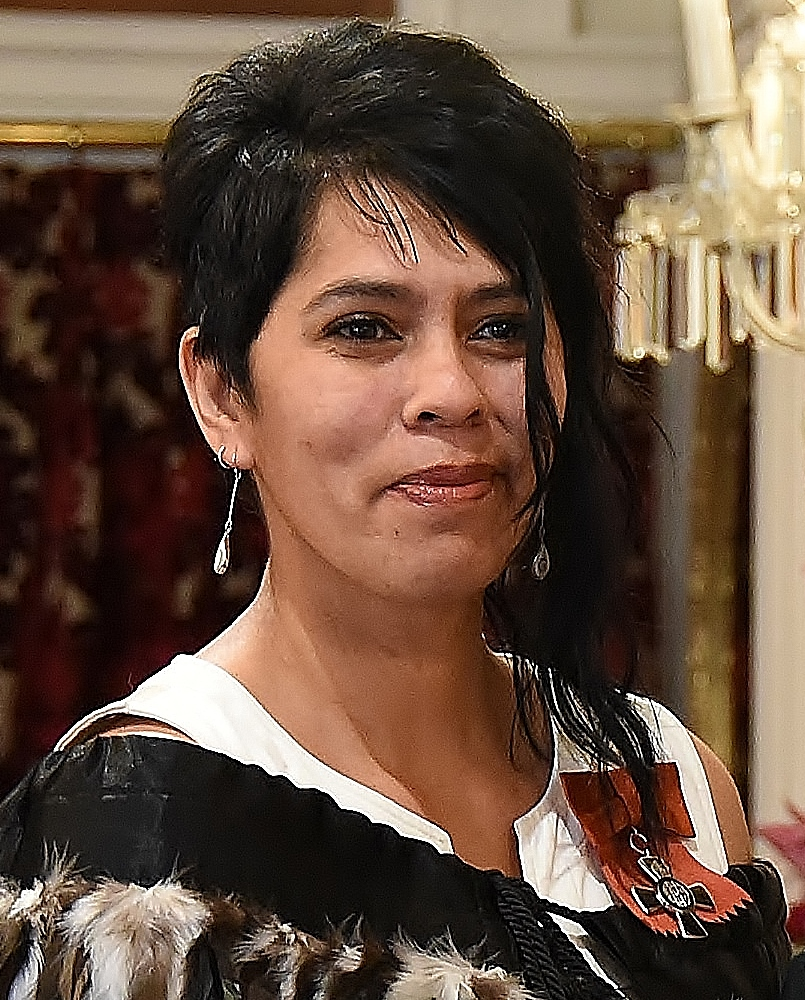
- Nihoniho in 2016
- Born: Maru Eva Nihoniho; 4 January 1973 (age 52); Christchurch, New Zealand
- Occupation: Video game developer
- Years active: 2003–present
- Known for: Founder of Metia Interactive
- Notable work: Sparx

Maru Eva Nihoniho MNZM (born 4 January 1973) is a New Zealand video game developer. She is the founder and managing director of Metia Interactive, and has designed and developed several video games, including Sparx.

== Life and career ==
Nihoniho was born in Christchurch on 4 January 1973 to Kui and Rongotehengia Nihoniho. She is of Māori descent and affiliates to Ngāi Tahu, Ngāti Porou and Te Whānau-ā-Apanui. She grew up at Tuahiwi and in Christchurch, and has had an interest in video games since the age of 11.

In 2003, Nihoniho founded the Metia Interactive company. Metia Interactive's debut game, Cube, was released on the PlayStation Portable in 2007. Following the release of Cube, Nihoniho was approached by the University of Auckland to develop a self-help game to combat depression. This game was specifically made with New Zealand's Māori and minority ethnic groups in mind. The resulting product, Sparx, was released in 2013. The game was developed and modelled on cognitive behavioral therapy.

In 2017, during her last year at Tech Futures Lab, Nihoniho developed Tākaro, an educational game aimed at children, as her key project. That year, she finished her master's degree in technological futures with the Tech Futures Lab. Nihoniho went on to develop several games, such as Guardian Maia, with the stated goal of introducing others to Māori culture.

== Honours and awards ==
In the 2016 Queen's Birthday Honours, Nihoniho was appointed a Member of the New Zealand Order of Merit, for services to the gaming industry and mental health. She was named Innovator of the Year in the 2017 MCV Pacific Women in Games Awards, presented by Xbox, and Māori Entrepreneur of the Year in 2018.

In 2018, Forbes named Nihoniho as one of the top 50 women in tech.
