= International Rising With Kindness Youth Summit =

Rising With Kindness was the theme of the fourth International Youth summit conducted as a three-day seminar organised by Heartfulness Institute in association with United Nations Educational, Scientific and Cultural Organization (UNESCO) Mahatma Gandhi Institute of Education for Peace and Sustainable Development (MGIEP) and All India Council for Technical Education (AICTE). The seminar was designed to create an awareness of growth practices as an individual along with social and environmental growth with a focus on yoga, meditation and inter-faith discussions among youth from different countries. Around 12,000 youth and academics from many countries attended the seminar.

== Objective ==
Rising With Kindness was the theme of the fourth International Youth Summit which started in 2018 and was organised as a three-day residential seminar by Heartfulness in association with UNESCO Mahatma Gandhi Institute of Education for Peace and Sustainable Development (MGIEP) and AICTE to spread awareness of practices for self, society, and environment. The conference was hosted at Kanha Santhi Vanam, international headquarters of Heartfulness Institute.

== Participation ==
The fourth International Rising With Kindness Youth Summit event was attended by around 12,000 youths who are students and academics. Among those addressing the event were the Global Teacher of Empathy and Kindness (SEEK), Daaji, the Director of UNESCO MGIEP, Dr. Anantha Duraiappah, the Chairman of AICTE, Dr. Anil Sahasrabudhe, World Champion in Badminton, P V Sindhu, the Chief National Coach of the Indian Badminton Team, Mr. Gopichand, and the Indian singer and director Khatija Rahman.

== See also ==
- Youth in India
