= Bloon =

Bloon may refer to:

- Bloon, an enemy in the Bloons video games
- Bloon, a proposed balloon-based aircraft by Zero 2 Infinity
