= Interactive Games and Entertainment Association =

- Abbreviation: IGEA
- Formation: 2002; 24 years ago
- CEO: Ron Curry
- Website: igea.net
- Formerly called: Interactive Entertainment Association of Australia

The Interactive Games and Entertainment Association (IGEA) is the industry association for computer and video games in Australia and New Zealand.

The IGEA represents companies that are publishers, distributors and marketers of interactive entertainment products including video games and related hardware. The association's members include globally recognized companies, including Google, Microsoft, Sony and Nintendo. The IGEA also has smaller independent game developers as members.

The IGEA represents its members and the video game industry on business and public policy issues such as copyright and intellectual property, media classification, government funding for local game development, games in education and cyber-safety.

== History ==
The IGEA registered with the Australian Securities and Investments Commission in 2002 as the Interactive Entertainment Association of Australia (IEAA). One of the founding directors of the IEAA was Ron Curry who has been the CEO and principal spokesperson of the association since 2008. In 2014 Curry was awarded the MCV Pacific Pillar of Industry Award for his contribution to the video game industry.

From 2010 to 2012, Stephanie Brantz, an Australian sports presenter, acted as a spokesperson and ambassador for the IGEA. Brantz appeared in YouTube videos. for the association and authored opinion pieces which focused on responsible parenting and cyber-safety.

In March 2020, members of the Game Developers Association of Australia (GDAA) voted to allow IGEA to acquire all GDAA assets and run both organizations under the IGEA banner. This included GDAA's Game Connect Asia Pacific (GCAP) annual developers' convention.

== Publications ==
The IGEA publishes biennial research reports which present data and insights into how interactive entertainment is used by consumers in the Australian and New Zealand markets.

The first report published by the association was the GamePlay Australia: Australians and Computer Games report published in 2005. The first New Zealand focused report was published in 2010.

All of the reports have been authored by Jeffery E. Brand, PhD, from the Faculty of Society and Design at Bond University in Australia.
