= Bloons Tower Defense =

Video game series by Ninja Kiwi

- The logo of Bloons Tower Defense, the first game in the series
- Genre: Tower defense
- Developers: Ninja Kiwi; Digital Goldfish Ltd. (iOS)
- Publisher: Ninja Kiwi
- Platforms: Android, browser (Flash), iOS, macOS, Nintendo DSi, PlayStation Portable, Windows, Xbox One, Nintendo Switch
- First release: Bloons; August 16, 2007
- Latest release: Bloons Blitz; September 30, 2026
- Parent series: Bloons

Bloons Tower Defense (also known as Bloons TD or BTD) is a series of tower defense games under the Bloons series created and produced by Ninja Kiwi. The game was initially developed as a browser game, built upon the Adobe Flash platform and released in mid 2007. Later games in the series expanded to support various mobile platforms, including Android, iOS, Windows Phone, PlayStation Portable, Nintendo DSi, Windows, Linux and MacOS. Older games in the Bloons series are available through the Ninja Kiwi Archive on Steam, with the newest game in the archive being Bloons TD 5.

In the game, players attempt to prevent "Bloons" (the in-game name for balloons) from reaching the end of a set course by placing towers or road items along it that can pop the bloons in a variety of ways, typically by using the power of monkeys, magic, or technology. A handful of towers can stall the bloons and give the other towers more time to pop them by freezing and gluing the bloons. Money is gained by popping bloons, completing rounds, and collecting bananas from existing banana farms which can be spent on new towers, upgrades for existing ones, or temporary items such as exploding pineapples and road spikes. They also need to make sure that they do not lose all of their lives.

== Gameplay ==
The main objective of Bloons TD is to prevent Bloons (in-game name for balloons) from reaching the end of a defined track on a map that consists of one or more entrances and exits for the bloons. The game is a tower defense game and thus the player can choose various types of towers and traps to place around the track in order to defend against the bloons, gaining 1 in-game dollar for every layer of bloon popped. If a balloon reaches the end of a path, the player loses lives (or in later games, health); once these are all depleted, the game ends. The bloons always follow the map's set path on the track until they either reach the exit(s), are popped, or are moved to an earlier part of the track by a tower's ability.

In later games, there are multiple difficulty levels; for instance, in BTD5, there are four difficulty levels and in Bloons Monkey City there are six. The higher the difficulty the player plays on, the fewer lives they have and the more each tower and upgrade costs. There are also different types of maps rated by difficulty; in general, there are more types of maps in newer games.

=== Bloons ===
There are three classes of bloons in the game: regular (unnamed in the game), MOAB-class and Boss-class. As of Bloons TD 6, the regular bloons consist of: red, blue, green, yellow, pink, black, white, lead, zebra, rainbow, purple, and ceramic bloons. MOAB-class bloons are in the shape of a blimp and consist of: the MOAB (Massive Ornary Air Blimp), the BFB (Brutal Flying Behemoth), the DDT (Dark Dirigible Titan), the ZOMG (Zeppelin Of Mighty Gargantuaness), and the BAD (Big Airship of Doom). Tougher variants of most bloon types contain a number of specified weaker ones.

In later versions of the game, regular bloons possess sometimes special characteristics such as camo (which most towers cannot detect by default), regrowth (the ability for the bloons to slowly grow back to their original size), and fortified (which doubles the health of certain bloons), that resist certain tower types. With each level, the intensity of bloon waves proportionately increases. There are also boss levels, with tough bosses such as Blastapopulous, Bloonarius, Dreadbloon, Lych, Phayze, and Vortex. These bosses usually appear after 39 rounds. Bosses have very high health in normal boss mode, and have unique abilities. Some bosses have their own strengths and specials. Some installments have challenges, where the player has specific stipulations, such as only using certain towers, or having only one life.

=== Towers ===
Towers, most of which are monkeys, are the main defensive utility in the Bloons TD series. Each tower has its own unique purpose, power, and use, with some being powerful against specific bloons but unable to target others effectively. Every tower can be upgraded to increase power and other capabilities by spending the in-game currency, known simply as 'money', which is earned by popping bloons and at the end of each round. In Bloons TD 4 onwards, certain towers such as banana farms can be placed to produce additional money during a round (end of the round in Bloons TD 4).

== Main entries ==
Release timeline
| 2007 | Bloons Tower Defense and Bloons Tower Defense 2 |
| 2008 | Bloons TD 3 |
| 2009 | Bloons TD 4 |
| 2010 | Bloons Super Monkey, Bloons TD 4 Expansion |
| 2011 | Bloons TD 5 |
| 2012 | Bloons TD Battles |
| 2013 | Bloons Monkey City |
2014
2015
| 2016 | Bloons Supermonkey 2 |
2017
| 2018 | Bloons TD 6, Bloons Adventure Time TD |
2019
2020
| 2021 | Bloons Pop, Bloons TD Battles 2 |
2022
2023
| 2024 | Bloons Card Storm |
| 2025 | Rogue Legends, Frontier Legends |
| 2026 | Bloons Blitz |

There are currently six released numbered games in the Bloons TD series apart from various add-on packs and spin-offs such as Bloons TD 4 Expansion and Bloons Monkey City. The newest release, Bloons TD 6, was released on June 14, 2018. The series was retitled from Bloons Tower Defense to Bloons TD in 2009 due to infringement on the Tower Defense: Lost Earth trademark owned by Com2uS.

There are currently six mainline games, and many spin-off games based primarily on the Bloons Tower Defense series.

=== Bloons Tower Defense ===
A screenshot of the original Bloons Tower Defense

Bloons Tower Defense is the first game in the BTD series, released on August 16, 2007, as a free flash browser game.

In this first entry, players must defend against waves of different bloons with a small roster of towers which the player can position around the map. Bloons have a varying amount of layers, with each layer being pierced revealing the layer underneath until the bloon has been completely popped. If all 40 lives are lost, the game is over. If all 50 waves are passed, the player will win the game.

The game has 5 towers, the Dart Tower, Tack Tower, Ice Tower, Bomb Tower, and Super Monkey, which all appear in future Bloons Tower Defense games with minor name changes.

=== Bloons Tower Defense 2 ===
Bloons Tower Defense 2 was released soon after in October 2007, adding new towers, multiple map options, new bloons, and an option for the game's difficulty.

=== Bloons TD 3 ===
A screenshot of the Bloons TD 3 browser version from 2012 onwards

Bloons TD 3 was released on September 5, 2008, months after the release of Bloons Tower Defense 2, named differently due to a trademark dispute with Com2uS. As with the second game, new towers, bloons such as the MOAB (Massive Ordnance Air Bloon), and maps were added.

A version based on this game was released for iOS titled Bloons TD; made available on October 3, 2009, from the iOS App Store. This version had extra maps styled in snow and beach themes, and included OpenFeint achievements. The game included five map packs, containing a total of 15 different levels to play, with packs unlocked by completing the previous levels. This version of the game was also released for the PlayStation Portable in 2010. Another version of the game, simply titled Bloons TD, was released for DSiWare in 2011, containing 50 rounds to complete.

=== Bloons TD 4 ===
Bloons TD 4 was released on October 26, 2009, as an online freemium game with a proprietary iOS version released on December 7, 2010, developed in conjunction with Digital Goldfish. A sandbox mode allows experimentation with weapons and enemies, a new bloon called the BFB (Brutal Floating Behemoth), and an apopalypse mode makes the gameplay continuous without pausing between levels.

The gameplay underwent changes including a graphical update, the ability to save the current game, and the introduction of an unlock-based leveling system. The tower upgrading system received various changes including increasing the number of upgrades per tower, and new maps and game modes were added. With the introduction of these new maps, water tiles were available, a mechanic which allows you to place the new Monkey Buccaneer.

iPhone and iPad versions of this title have been purchased over one million times. A version of the game was also released as a DSiWare game in 2012.

On July 8, 2010, Bloons TD 4 received a standalone "expansion pack" called Bloons TD 4 Expansion which added the Dartling Gun and Spike Factory towers, both of which would remain in future games, 4 new tracks, a new game mode called "Deflation", and a new "Tower Specialties" game mechanic. The latter allows the player to specialize in a certain tower type.

=== Bloons TD 5 ===
Bloons TD 5
- A screenshot of the Bloons TD 5 iOS version
- Developer: Ninja Kiwi
- Publisher: Ninja Kiwi
- Series: Bloons Tower Defense
- Engine: Adobe Flash
- Platforms: Microsoft Windows, macOS, Android, iOS, Xbox One, PlayStation 4, Nintendo Switch
- Release: Flash: WW: December 13, 2011; Android, iOS: WW: November 15, 2012; macOS: WW: 2013; Steam: WW: November 19, 2014; Xbox One: WW: March 3, 2017; PlayStation 4: WW: May 9, 2017; Nintendo Switch: WW: June 13, 2018
- Genre: Tower defense
- Modes: Single-player, multi-player

The original (Flash and freemium) Bloons TD 5 was released on December 13, 2011. The proprietary version of BTD5 was released on iOS worldwide on November 15, 2012, for iPhones and iPods with improved graphics and additional upgrades, tracks, towers, and bloon types. On November 19, 2014, it was released on Steam.

Bloons TD 5 Deluxe was released on January 27, 2012, for US$19.99 during the promotional pre-order period. This offline Flash version of the game added 2 new towers (the "Bloonchipper" and "Monkey Engineer"), 6 new tracks, 4 ported tracks from Bloons TD 4, a "moving tower platform" mechanic, three new "Special Agent" towers and four additional "Special Missions". All of the game's premium features, which were paid for with the "NinjaKiwi Coin" digital currency in BTD5, were also made into free unlockable options that could be unlocked with the in-game earnable currency. This version of the game also has high-resolution graphics. An update for the mobile version of BTD5 added a new tower called the "Monkey Sub". The submarine was later added to the online version on July 22, 2015. Bloons TD 5 Deluxe was discontinued and made no longer available for purchase in November 2014 in favor of the newer Steam port, which all owners of Deluxe received for free through e-mail.

As with previous games of the series, the player has to protect the exit(s) against enemy Bloons by using various monkeys and monkey-operated machines placed in strategic locations to fight them off effectively. Compared to earlier versions of the series, there is a wider variety of different towers and their upgrades.

This game also has an unlimited round free play mode, which can have bloons with increasing strengths until the ZOMG type MOAB-class bloon. Speed and health ramping also buff the blimp hp throughout the rounds. The Steam/Mobile version has two special mode bosses, the Dreadbloon and Blastapopoulos. The iOS, Android, and Steam versions have 15 languages: English, Arabic, Danish, Finnish, French, German, Italian, Japanese, Korean, Norwegian, Portuguese, Russian, Spanish, Swedish, and Turkish. On March 3, 2017, it was released for Microsoft's Xbox One, later releasing for PlayStation 4 on May 9, 2017, and Nintendo Switch on June 13, 2018, all of which cost US$14.99.

This game also has daily challenges. There are 2347 daily challenges on web. The first challenge (Monkey Lane, Easy) was released on January 27, 2012, and 'The Final (New) Daily Challenge' was released on June 30, 2018.

=== Bloons TD 6 ===
Bloons TD 6 is the sixth game in the main Bloons TD series. After being announced on March 28, 2017, it was released for the iOS App Store and the Google Play Store on June 14, 2018. A Steam version was released on December 17, 2018. Unlike all earlier games, Bloons TD 6 does not have a Flash-based counterpart on the Ninja Kiwi website. In Bloons TD 6, it is played from a 2.5D perspective, as opposed to the 2D perspective of previous Bloons Tower Defense games, and utilizes 3D computer graphics.

Bloons TD 6 expands on traditional Bloons Tower Defense gameplay with "Heroes", who will progressively level up once placed, making them stronger as the game progresses. 3 "Tier 5" Monkeys of the same type can be merged with money and other copies of the monkey into extremely expensive but extremely powerful versions of themselves called "Paragons", combining the power of its constituent monkeys into a single strong monkey. Certain maps contain obstacles that can prevent many monkeys from seeing or attacking over them.

Maps are chosen at the discretion of the player, and more difficult ones are unlocked by completing games on easier maps that you have not completed before. As the player completes games on the same map by playing on different game difficulties, additional game modes become unlocked for that map. In standard gameplay, each map can be played on three different game difficulties. On top of the standard game mode, Bloons TD 6 offers multiple additional game modes that use certain rules and restrictions, such as limiting what monkeys the player can use or making Bloons stronger in some aspects. Players can create games featuring rules not present in ordinary games, for example, they may limit the number of monkeys that may be used. These can be created using the "Challenge Editor", and these can be played by other players using the "Challenge Browser".

Daily and weekly events can be optionally played, rewarding currency when completed. Daily Challenges and Advanced Challenges are challenges that have a set of special rules added. "Race Events", where "rounds" of Bloons can be sent early to obtain the fastest time possible, "Odyssey Mode", where a limited selection of monkeys must be used to complete several maps in a row, and "Boss Bloons", where "Boss Bloons" must be destroyed, with different Boss Bloons being able to affect gameplay in different ways. A mini-game called "Contested Territory" is a weekly event that sets up to 90 players in six random teams from around the world to fight for various tiles scattered across a hexagonal island; each tile contains a unique set of rules, which the player must follow and complete in order to capture the tile. In update 39.0, the Map Editor was added, allowing players to make their own maps with props, effects, pets, up to 5 paths, a base floor, and areas.

Over time, towers from Bloons TD 5 were added, first being the "Mortar Monkey" in update 6.0, then the "Engineer Monkey" in update 12.0, and then finally the "Dartling Gun", renamed to "Dartling Gunner" in update 22.0. In update 36.0, a new tower—the Beast Handler—was added, which controls water, ground and air beasts, which can merge with other Beast Handlers' beasts to increase their power. In 44.0, another brand-new amphibious tower—the Mermonkey—was implemented, which has various ocean-themed upgrades. In update 49.0, another new tower — the Desperado — was added which had various gun upgrades.

== Spin-offs ==
Apart from the main series, Ninja Kiwi has made several BTD games that include the core gameplay of BTD but are not numbered sequels.

=== Bloons TD Battles ===
Bloons TD Battles was released on December 12, 2012, and later to Android and iOS platforms in-between November 5 and 6, 2013, respectively. On April 20, 2016, it came to Steam as a ported version.

The gameplay is similar to that in Bloons TD 5 but two players compete against one another in one of four game modes. In Assault Mode and Battle Arena, each player normally progresses through the levels that are usually equal to 2x-1 in terms of BTD5 levels. For example, round 7 in BTD Battles would be round 13 in BTD5. However, the players are also given the ability to purchase additional bloons, which are sent to the opponent in an attempt to overwhelm them.

In "Defense" mode, the players play a natural game with the screen split vertically. Players can spend money to increase their income. In "Card Battles" mode, the players choose from a selection of cards to use in their games. The cards have two functions: sending bloons to the enemy player, which, like in Assault Mode, will give the player who sends the bloons extra income; and placing down a tower. All three game mode objectives are to outlast the opponent in surviving the bloon attacks. Using the games' skill-based matching system, players can be automatically matched with one another. The last mode is Club Battles, in which players can play with up to three of the six game-modifying "cards". The card selection can be chosen ahead of time when playing against a friend in a private lobby but is random when playing other opponents. Players earn a club ticket every day at 7 PM, or they can receive one club ticket from the daily wheel. Another mode is Battle with Friends, in which a player can play one of the four game modes with a friend, not a random player, by entering a code for the player's private lobby.

=== Bloons Monkey City ===
Like Bloons TD Battles, the core gameplay is similar to that of BTD5, however, the player has to maintain a city, expanding the city by capturing bloon-infested areas called tiles. One important goal of the game is levelling up the city. Players earn XP for the city by capturing tiles, completing missions or building towers. Earning higher levels with XP grants access to certain unique game features, like Monkey vs. Monkey, Monkey Knowledge, etc.

Monkey vs. Monkey allows players to fight each other; raids can be launched using the resource "Bloontonium". This can be acquired by capturing certain tiles or with Bloontonium generators. If the opponent fails to defend against the raid in the set time period, the attacker gains city cash, another resource in the game used to build towers, bloonstones, the 'premium currency' of the game, and city honor, which has no primary purpose in the game other than achievements.

One primary difference between this game and the others in the Bloons series is the addition of buildings. Buildings in Bloons Monkey City are required in order to use and upgrade towers. Some buildings serve as prerequisites to other buildings, while others are prerequisites to using certain bloons in raids. The number of towers the player can use in a game is determined by how many of the corresponding type of building the player possesses. Some buildings unlock new monkeys, while upgrade buildings unlock upgrades to be researched for these monkeys. There are also special starred tiles that are required to capture in order to unlock the Monkey Engineer, the Bloonchipper, the Heli-Pilot, and the Monkey Sub. They also unlock permanent boosts (Special Items) to attack speed or pierce for specific towers or how long their effect lasts like the Glue Gunner. Special buildings are required to unlock the tier four upgrades, camo bloon defense, and MOAB-class bloon popping power (the Sun God and Robo Monkey also require buildings). This game contains 3,000 tiles in each city (9 of which are already captured, leaving 2991 tiles for the player to capture), and a new MOAB-class bloon, the DDT (or Dark Dirigible Titan).

In mid-2014, Ninja Kiwi released a new mode known as Contested Territory, a mini-game which offers bonus rewards, and pits players against each other, all of whom compete to survive the most rounds for the longest time on a trickier-than-normal track. This game was released on browsers, but a port to iOS and Android was released on December 3, 2014, and February 18, 2015, respectively. The Steam version was released on April 10, 2020.

=== Bloons Adventure Time TD ===
Bloons Adventure Time TD
- Developer: Ninja Kiwi
- Publisher: Ninja Kiwi
- Series: Bloons Tower Defense
- Engine: Unity
- Platforms: Android, iOS, Microsoft Windows, macOS
- Release: Android, iOS: AU: July 14, 2018; SEA: July 14, 2018; WW: August 28, 2018; Steam: WW: January 16, 2019
- Genre: Tower defense
- Mode: Single-player

Bloons Adventure Time TD is a crossover game between Ninja Kiwi's Bloons TD series and Cartoon Network's Adventure Time series that was announced via the Cartoon Network International News Site and the Ninja Kiwi blog on March 8 and 9, 2018, respectively. The game had a soft launch on July 14, 2018, in Australia, New Zealand, Philippines, and Singapore on Android and iOS and later launched internationally. The game features characters from Cartoon Network's Adventure Time such as Jake the Dog, Finn the Human, and Princess Bubblegum as well as new monkey heroes like Max, Cassie, and C4 Charlie. This game is different from the main Bloons TD formula in that you could only place one of each tower, like the hero system in Bloons TD 6. The gameplay is similar to other games in the series, with a new weapon and item mechanic as well. There are at least 15 adventures and 50 maps to play in that act as the playing stage of the game.

=== Bloons TD Battles 2 ===
Bloons TD Battles 2
- Developer: Ninja Kiwi
- Publisher: Ninja Kiwi
- Series: Bloons Tower Defense
- Platforms: Android, iOS, Microsoft Windows, macOS
- Release: Android, iOS, Steam: WW: December 1, 2021
- Genre: Tower defense
- Mode: Player-versus-player

Bloons TD Battles 2, the sequel to Bloons TD Battles, was released on November 30, 2021. It was first leaked in Ninja Kiwi's YouTube video for Bloons TD 6's 24.0 update, on an iPad on the side. On October 22, 2021, another trailer was released titled "The rules of the Arena" detailing more gameplay.

The gameplay is similar to the original Bloons TD Battles. Two players compete with each other in a player versus player gameplay, with three monkey types and a Hero, defending against pregenerated rounds and Bloon sends from the other player. The game also has 3-D graphics and more Bloon types, similar to Bloons TD 6. Players must create a defense consisting of monkeys and machines that protect against waves of Bloons, which otherwise results in a loss of lives if the bloons reach the exit(s). The battle is over upon losing all lives or by having more lives than the opponent before sudden death, with the winner being the survivor of the battle or the one with motr lives by sudden death.

In Bloons TD Battles 2, the player must outsmart the opponent by sending Bloons at the opponent while simultaneously defending against their sent Bloons. Players automatically generate "eco", which is automatically earned cash every few seconds, allowing them to spend money on towers and upgrades over time. Winning allows the player to advance to higher arenas, which sends them to arenas of higher prestige. Reaching the maximum arena, Hall of Masters, allows the player to rank up on the game's public leaderboard.

Optionally, players can unlock cosmetics that can be bought for visual appeal, as well as unlock heroes, towers, and Tier 5 upgrades, using a currency called Monkey Money.

In March 2024, Bloons TD Battles 2 was re-released in Apple Arcade as Bloons TD Battles 2+.

== Reception ==
Aggregate review scores
| Game | Year | Metacritic |
|---|---|---|
| Bloons | 2009 2010 | PSP: 68/100 Wii: 21/100 |
| Bloons TD 4 | 2009 | iOS: 69/100 |
| Bloons TD 5 | 2012 | iOS: 79/100 |
| Bloons TD Battles | 2012 | iOS: 78/100 |
| Bloons TD 6 | 2018 | iOS: 81/100 |

Shortly after the release of Bloons Tower Defense, Lore Sjöberg of Wired described the game as cheerful and addictive, calling it "pop culture at its best". In 2012, Justin Davis of IGN described Bloons Tower Defense as one of the best free tower defense games, despite its "amateurish" artwork. He later noted the first entry's lack of depth, and that the sequel improved this.

IGN editor Daemon Hatfield said that he thought Bloons TD 3 succeeded in standing out in the crowded genre by having sufficient core game mechanics and adding an individual twist. The game's iOS version received mixed reviews with some authors praising the unique towers and good gameplay, though the user interface, controls, and lack of leaderboards were criticized. The DS version received similar reception, with Lucas Thomas of IGN describing it as "a pretty good take on good old Bloons TD." Eurogamer's Kristan Reed gave the PSP version 8/10, describing it as "transfixing", though he said that the music appeared to be designed to "drive you insane".

GameZebo editor Jim Squires gave Bloons TD 4 a 3.5/5 rating, praising it on its well designed maps and towers and for having a large amount of content, but he criticized the game for not "bringing anything new to the genre." GamePro editor Ryan Rigney gave Bloons TD 4 a 2/5 rating, stating that it had the same Bloons Tower Defense gameplay as the previous titles, and "the screen eventually gets so hectic that it's no longer fun to play"; an issue which many other reviews also responded negatively to.

Bloons TD 5 was received similarly to its previous version, with reviewers commenting positively on the number of maps, towers, and levels, but criticising the lack of innovation to the tower-defense genre and performance issues at higher levels. Both Bloons TD 4 and Bloons TD 5 featured among the top 10 paid iPhone apps in the iOS App Store, with Bloons TD 4 selling over 1 million copies. Bloons TD remained in the top 100 apps for at least 3 months, and Bloons TD 5 was the 8th most purchased iPhone app in 2013. Overall, the game series has been played over 1 billion times across web and mobile devices.

Bloons TD 6 received praise for its extended gameplay variety, but has also been criticized for its lack of replayability despite the increased number of unique elements in the game.

The success of the Bloons TD franchise had been given praise by digital investment company Modern Times Group, with special note on Ninja Kiwi's continuous work to "pioneer" the tower defense genre in an economically viable but quality format. Modern Times Group announced that it had acquired Ninja Kiwi on March 24, 2021.
