= New Zealand Game Developers Association =

New Zealand nonprofit association

New Zealand Game Developer Association (NZGDA)
- Formation: 2001; 25 years ago
- Region served: New Zealand
- Website: https://www.nzgda.com/

The New Zealand Game Developers Association (NZGDA) is a nonprofit association that was founded in 2001 to help support the video game development industry in New Zealand.

The primary mission of the NZGDA is to build the New Zealand video game development industry into a preferred supplier of related products and services. It also facilitates communication for New Zealand game developers, and aims to create quality development, and business capabilities within New Zealand. The NZGDA coordinates monthly Game Developer Meetups in Auckland, Wellington, Christchurch and Dunedin. It also runs the annual New Zealand Game Developers Conference and Kiwi Game Starter startup challenge.

The Association says that New Zealand game developers earned $759.57 million in the year to 1 April 2025, of which 95% came from international audiences. The industry employed 1418 full-time professional game developers in a variety of roles, which has grown 29% over the previous year.

NZGDA members can be either studios or individuals making PC, console, mobile, web, VR/AR, educational, serious and even board games. The organisation's chairperson for 2025 is Carl Leducq, a game developer in Christchurch, New Zealand.

== Members ==
- 2UP Games
- A44
- Balancing Monkey Games
- Beyond
- Blitz Research
- Camshaft Software
- CerebralFix
- Digital Confectioners
- Dinosaur Polo Club
- Dry Cactus Games
- Endesga
- Flightless
- Gamefroot
- GEO AR Games
- Grinding Gear Games
- InGame
- JaffaJam
- Media Design School
- Method
- M-Theory
- Metia Interactive
- MYTONA
- Ninja Kiwi
- OddBoy
- Outerdawn
- PikPok / Sidhe Interactive
- RageQuit Studios
- RiffRaff Games (Prior name 'Studio Mayday')
- Rocketwerkz
- Runaway Play
- Rush Digital
- Spotted Kiwi Interactive
- StaplesVR
- Starcolt
- Swibo Ltd
- Synty Studios
- Weta Workshop
