= Path of Exile 2 =

- Developer: Grinding Gear Games
- Publisher: Grinding Gear Games
- Directors: Jonathan Rogers; Mark Roberts
- Composer: Kamil Orman-Janowski
- Platforms: Windows; PlayStation 5; Xbox Series X/S
- Release: 6 December 2024 (early access); 11 December 2026 (1.0 full release)
- Genre: Action role-playing
- Modes: Single-player, multiplayer

Path of Exile 2 is an upcoming action role-playing video game developed and published by Grinding Gear Games. A sequel to Path of Exile (2013), the game was released as a paid early access title for Windows, PlayStation 5, and Xbox Series X/S on 6 December 2024, and is set to be released in full on 11 December 2026.

== Gameplay ==
Game screenshot

Path of Exile 2, like its predecessor, is an isometric action role-playing dungeon crawling video game. It will introduce a skill system built upon the system featured in Path of Exile, with 240 active skill gems (which allow the player to perform a variety of abilities) and 200 support gems (which modify how the active skill gems function). There will be twelve character classes that each have three Ascendancy Classes (which function as a branch of a class that further specializes it's abilities). New weapons will be introduced, such as spears, crossbows and flails, as well as supplementary items like focuses, traps and redesigned scepters. The passive skill tree will have 2000 skills available to allocate and will allow the player to split their skill point allocation, which will in turn enable swapping play styles on the fly. A dodge roll movement mechanic will be added. Spirit, a new resource used to enable things like auras and companions, replaces the mana reservation system of the first game. Many other changes, such as permanent minions, trigger skills, game engine, and graphic improvements will be a part of the sequel.

After completing the six-act storyline, players gain access to more than 100 endgame maps. Each endgame map contains a boss fight and map modifiers that enable revamped versions of many of Path of Exile's past leagues.

Compared to the previous game, Path of Exile 2's gameplay puts a greater focus on challenging boss encounters which require precise timing and positioning. It also introduces many mechanics incentivizing players to connect multiple skills in a combo-like fashion. For example, crossbow users can launch gas grenades whose fumes can then be ignited to make them explode, staff users can summon large bells that emit damaging shockwaves when struck, and bow users can embed lightning rod arrows in the ground, which can then be charged up with other lightning skills to emit lightning-infused bursts. In the endgame, players explore an infinite atlas of monster infested maps with occasional bosses and merchants.

== Story ==
The early access version of the game, released on December 6, 2024, takes place roughly 20 years after the events of the first game. The setting is Wraeclast, a continent in a high fantasy world with various factions inspired by mythology. Factions include the Celtic-inspired Ezomytes, the Roman Empire-inspired Eternal Empire, the Polynesian-inspired Karui, and the Aztec-inspired Vaal.

In the introductory cutscene, a hooded man is hunted by a party of combatants, who fall victims one by one to his powers until the leader of the expedition intervenes, stabbing the hooded man through the chest with his magic sword. The leader steals a spherical container from the man and hands it over to the sole survivor of the hunting party, who opens it, revealing a writhing mass of tentacles. One of the creature’s tentacles then lashes out and slits the survivor’s throat, after which the creature devours him and grows in size. After hanging the hooded man to a tree, the leader carries the creature away in a cage, from which tentacles detach and spread on the soil in root-like structures.

The player begins as a criminal to be hanged in the county of Ogham, part of the Ezomyte region of Wraeclast. For each character, the voice of the leader of the expedition recounts the alleged crimes that warranted their death sentence. After the player selects which character they intend to play, the gallows' trapdoors open, executing everyone except the selected character, whose rope snaps, allowing them to escape by plunging themselves in a nearby river. They wake up on the riverbank and, after fending off aggressive risen corpses, they take shelter in a sawmill with other refugees, learning that Count Geonor of Ogham has gone insane as a mysterious corruption is spreading through the county, raising the dead and mutating the living into horrifying monsters. Working to stop him, the player finds the hooded man and frees him from the spell the count used to subdue him. The hooded figure describes how the creature the count had stolen is a "seed of corruption" that he had attempted to hide from humanity due to its dangerous properties. The player learns that not only has the count been executing every criminal to feed the seed, but he has also torn apart his own manor to excavate ancient corpses who are then devoured by the worm-like tentacles still trapped in the cage. The player eventually defeats the count, but not before his wife, the countess Oriana, escapes, bringing with her the fledgling creature. The hooded figure interrogates Geonor, who reveals he was being controlled by Oriana all along and that she escaped in the Vastiri desert. The hooded man reveals the creature is the Beast, a divine but mindless being created thousands of years before by the god Sin to suppress all gods and keep them from destroying humanity with their strife. The Beast was killed around twenty years before by the Exile during the events of the first game, and all that remained of it was the seed stolen from the hooded figure by Geonor.

The player and the hooded stranger chase the countess by earning passage on the desert caravan of the Ardura, a tribe of the Maraketh people who inhabit the desert where once the Beast was located. They find out that Oriana has used the Beast to revive Jamanra, the ancient king and messiah of the Faridun tribe, which is composed by the descendants of the children forsaken by the Maraketh. Giving them the prospect to exact revenge against their rival tribe and rising their legendary King, Oriana managed to gain control of the Faridun and employ them to feed the Beast. The player chases the rival caravan across the Vastiri, fighting and learning the history and culture of the tribes inhabiting the desert. Eventually, the player reaches the Dreadnought, Jamanra's caravan, and defeats the Faridun King. Oriana escapes again with the Beast, which now has grown to a considerable size, having a head and a torso with stumps.

The player finds the Hooded man praying in a temple in ruin and questions him about his identity. He reveals to be Sin himself, the creator of the Beast. He explains how originally his hope was that the Beast would allow humanity to grow without divine interference, but instead it was used to evil ends by ambitious humans in the case of the Vaal Empire, the Eternal Empire, and the theocracy of Oriath. Sin asks the player to help him stop and destroy the Beast for good.

Sin says that the ancient Vaal Empire, the greatest civilization to ever form on Wraeclast, knew of a way to stop corruption and the Beast. They travel to the ruins of this former civilization, joining, in the midst of a jungle, a camp composed of explorers and treasure hunters. There, the player fights cannibal tribes, corrupted beasts, and explores the Vaal ruins. Eventually the player finds an ancient time machine that allows them to travel back in time to just before the fall of the Vaal civilization, on the eve of the Vaal Queen Atziri's disastrous attempt to merge with the Beast. However, the player is immediately met with violent opposition as the Vaal mistake them for a previous time traveler, who kept interfering with the construction of one of their most important temples, the temple of Atzoatl, by killing its architects and construction workers (this time traveler being the Exile in the first game, who kept doing incursions into Atzoatl purely for loot). After fighting the guards sent to stop them, the player meets with the royal thaumaturge Doryani. After defeating him and convincing him that the Vaal Empire would end that very day, Doryani joins the player in the present time to pursue the Beast.

Doryani suggests the player travel to Ngamakanui, a series of islands where certain artifacts could be found to help destroy the Beast.

The story of the Early Access version of the game ends at this point. During the current epilogue, the disastrous event brought forth by Atziri's merging with the Beast, the Cataclysm, destroys the time travel machine and strands the player in the past to fend off the corruption that spread in the world.

== Development ==
In November 2019, Grinding Gear Games announced the sequel, Path of Exile 2, during their Exilecon conference. The sequel was originally to be a new, seven-act story-line that would be available alongside the original campaign in the original Path of Exile with both the current and new storylines leading to the same shared endgame. Players would have the choice to play the Path of Exile or the sequel campaigns before reaching the same end-game. Players would be able to interact with each other regardless of their choice of campaign. However, in a 2023 announcement, it was revealed that the sequel would now be a separate game from the original Path of Exile with the sequel having a six-act campaign. However, most of the content purchased through microtransactions can be used across both games.

The early access launch featured six of the planned twelve classes: Warrior, Monk, Mercenary, Sorceress, Witch, and Ranger. Early access launched with only three of the six acts the finished game will contain, as well as an evolved endgame system. The remaining classes, including the Druid and Huntress, were slated to be introduced in future updates.

In the game's first major update, Dawn of the Hunt (Version 0.2.0), the Huntress class was added to the game, along with five new Ascendancies for the Huntress and existing classes. In the major update The Third Edict (Version 0.3.0), the original 'cruel' difficulty acts one to three was replaced with a new act four, and three mini-act interludes. The Druid class was introduced on December 12, 2025 in the Last of The Druids (Version 0.4.0) update, coinciding with an in-game economy reset, balance updates, and new gameplay mechanics. Return of the Ancients (Version 0.5.0) was released at the end of May 2026. This update included a massive endgame rebalance and reworking of a number of the core endgame mechanics.

A beta version of Path of Exile 2 was originally expected to release in "very late" 2020. However, it was delayed due to COVID-19 lockdowns in New Zealand, China, and other parts of the world where the outsourcing companies are located. The game was released through early access for Windows PC, PlayStation 5, and Xbox Series X and Series S on 6 December 2024. The 1.0 release of the game is set to be released on 11 December 2026.

Marae, pounamu armour, tekoteko, and other Māori imagery feature prominently in the Māori-inspired expansion of the game. Some Māori in the sector are questioning the use of specific Māori carving imagery which may be cultural appropriation. After concerns were raised, an investigation by Grinding Gear Games has led to the Māori carving imagery being removed.

== Expansions ==
| Patch | Title | Release date | Notes |
|---|---|---|---|
| 0.1.0 | Early Access Launch | 6 December 2024 | This was the inaugural launch of Path of Exile 2, which contained six starting classes, three story acts, and established the game's foundation. |
| 0.2.0 | Dawn of the Hunt | 4 April 2025 | Dawn of the Hunt became the first official season release of Path of Exile 2. It introduced the huntress class as well as new hunt mechanics. It also introduced a fresh wave of new unique items. |
| 0.3.0 | Update | 19 September 2025 | This update mainly focused on balance adjustments and quality of life changes and helped lay the groundwork for the future much larger 0.4.0 release. |
| 0.4.0 | The Last of the Druids | 12 December 2025 | This league brought the druid class to the list of pickable classes, as well as additional end game content and an expanded list of support gems. |
| 0.5.0 | Return of the Ancients | 29 May 2026 | This update aimed to overhaul the endgame, rework the skill trees and introduce upward of another 200 skill gems across different classes. Since there will be no 0.6.0 patch, this league becomes the direct bridge to the Path of Exile 2's official 1.0 release. |
