= Cube: 3D Puzzle Mayhem =

2007 puzzle video game

- Developer: Metia Interactive
- Publisher: D3 Publisher
- Platform: PlayStation Portable
- Release: NA: April 30, 2007; JP: July 19, 2007; EU: July 20, 2007
- Genre: Puzzle
- Mode: Single player

Cube: 3D Puzzle Mayhem, known as simply Cube in North America and as Simple 2500 Series Portable!! Vol. 10: The IQ Cube: Moyatto Atama o Puzzle de Sukkiri! (SIMPLE 2500 シリーズ ポータブル!! Vol.10 THE IQ CUBE 〜モヤっと頭をパズルでスッキリ！〜, Shinpuru 2500 Shirīzu Pōtaburu!!! Vol. 10 Za IQ Kyūbu 〜Moyatto Atama o Pazuru de Sukkiri!〜) (part of the Simple 2500 Portable series), is a puzzle video game developed by Metia Interactive and published by D3 Publisher in 2007.

== Reception ==
Reception

Aggregate score
Aggregator	Score
Metacritic	60/100

Review scores
Publication	Score
1Up.com	C
Famitsu	25/40
Game Informer	5.5/10
GamePro	2.75/5
GameSpot	5.2/10
GameSpy	2.5/5
GameZone	5.7/10
IGN	6.7/10
Jeuxvideo.com	10/20
PlayStation: The Official Magazine	7/10
The New York Times	(mixed)

The game received "mixed" reviews according to the review aggregation website Metacritic. In Japan, Famitsu gave it a score of 25 out of 40.
