= Anantha Duraiappah =

Professor Dr. Anantha Duraiappah
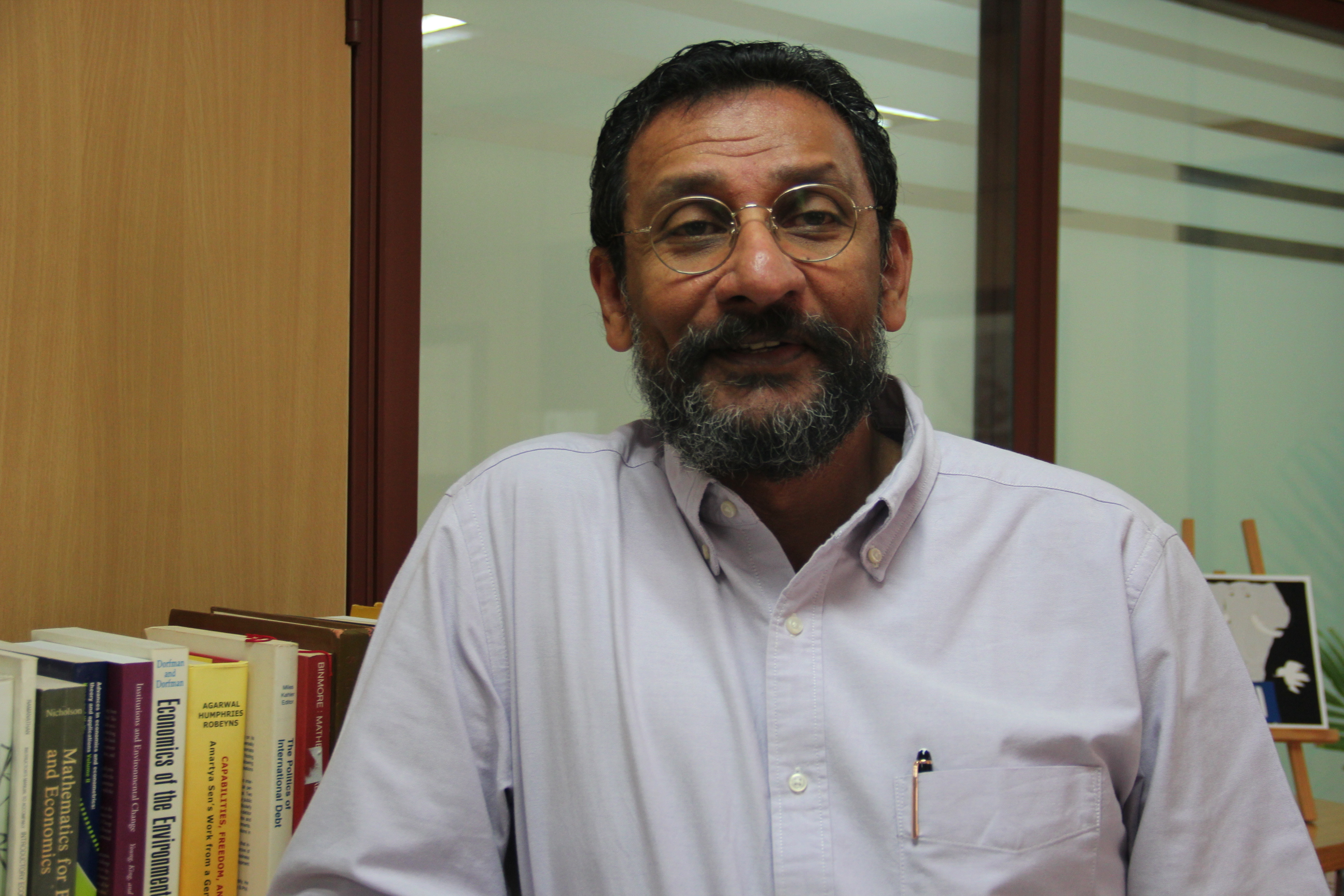

Director of the Mahatma Gandhi Institute of Education for Peace and Sustainable Development (MGIEP)
- In office 2014–2023

Personal details
- Education: Ph.D. in Economics, University of Texas, Austin MBA in Finance, University of San Francisco Bachelor of Science in Electronics, University of Kent, England

Anantha Duraiappah served as the inaugural director of the Mahatma Gandhi Institute of Education for Peace and Sustainable Development (MGIEP), a UNESCO Category 1 Research Institute in the Asia Pacific from 2014 to 2023. He is also currently visiting professor in the Urban Institute at the Kyushu University, Japan, former visiting professor, University of Tokyo, Japan, a fellow of The World Academy of Sciences (TWAS), a fellow and member, World Academy of Arts and Sciences and a member of the advisory board, Journal - Indian Society of Ecological Economics. He has previously worked in senior positions at the United Nations University, United Nations Environment Programme, International Institute for Sustainable Development and was previously an academic at Vrije Universiteit, National University of Singapore and European University Institute. Dr. Duraiappah is also formally trained in the modern Japanese martial art of Kendo.

== Education ==
Duraiappah obtained his Bachelor of Science in Electronics University of Kent, England, in 1980, MBA in Finance, University of San Francisco America in 1983 and Ph.D. in Economics, University of Texas, Austin, America in 1991

== Career ==
Duraiappah was the director, UNESCO Mahatma Gandhi Institute of Education for Peace and Sustainable Development (MGIEP) from 2014 to December 2023. During his directorship the institute developed The International Science and Evidence based Education (ISEE) Assessment, LIBRE, theTalking across Generations on Education (TAGe) dialogue platform, the Knowledge Commons platform and the online SixthSpace.

He is also responsible for developing the Empathy, Mindfulness, Compassion, Critical inquiry (EMC2) model which is an approach on Social and Emotional Learning (SEL). Dr Anantha has also developed UNESCO MGIEP's Artificial Intelligence powered General Data Protection Regulation (GDPR) compliant learning platform, FramerSpace, now being used across many countries by schools, educators and students.

Duraiappah is also currently:

- Visiting professor, Urban Institute at the Kyushu University, Japan
- Fellow, The World Academy of Sciences (TWAS)
- Fellow and member, World Academy of Arts and Sciences
- Member of the advisory board, Journal - Indian Society of Ecological Economics.
- Co-chair of The International Science and Evidence based Education (ISEE) Assessment

=== Previous positions ===
Position & Organisations	Country	Tenure
Executive Director, IHDP - United Nations University	Germany	Jan’10 – Jun‘14
Chief, Ecosystem Services and Economics Unit, UNEP	Kenya	Jan’06 – Dec‘09
Director, Economic Policy and Senior Economist, International Institute for Sustainable Development	Canada	May’00 – Dec’05
Senior Research Economist & Head of the Mathematical Modeling Group, Institute for Environmental Studies, Vrije Universiteit	Amsterdam	Apr‘95 – Apr’00
Lecturer in Economics, National University of Singapore	Singapore	Mar‘93 – Mar’95
Research Fellow, European Policy Unit, The European University Institute	Italy	Jan‘91 – Feb’93
Executive Resident Officer, The Hong Kong and Shanghai Bank	Malaysia	Mar‘84 – Jun’86

== Published works ==
=== Bibliography ===
- Duraiappah, A.K and others. Ecology, Economy and Society: essays in honor of Kanchan Chopra. Springer, New Delhi, India. 2017.
- Duraiappah, A.K and others., The Inclusive Wealth Report 2014, IHDP-UNU and UNEP, Cambridge. University Press, 2014
- Duraiappah, A.K et al., Satoyama-Satoumi Ecosystems and Human Well-being, United Nations University Press, Tokyo 2012
- Duraiappah and others, Millennium Ecosystem Assessment., Ecosystems and Human Well-being: Synthesis report of the Millennium Ecosystem Assessment, Island Press, 2005.
- Duraiappah, A.K., Computational Models in the Economics of Environment and Development, Dordrecht, Holland: Springer, Environmental Series, 2003.
- Duraiappah, A.K., Global Warming and Economic Development: A Holistic Approach to International Policy Cooperation and Coordination, Dordrecht, Holland: Springer, 1993. (Translated into Japanese 1995)

=== Articles ===
- Time to establish emotional resilience with The Hindu
- Education in the Time of COVID-19 with UCL CEID Blog
- Education for a better future with npj I Science of Learning
- Covid-19: An opportunity to get our priorities right with The Times of India
- For an Education that Fosters Human Flourishing with Thrive Global
- Of gaming and Gandhi: How to save our education systems with UNESCO Bangkok
- How to prevent violent extremism through education: This UNESCO research institute might have an answer with India Today
- Why our schools need more focus on quality education than rote learning with DailyO
- Pedagogy of happiness and well-being with The Pioneer
- Is Kindness the Secret to Achieving the Sustainable Development Goals? with UN Chronicle
- The role of a teacher will have to change with Financial Express
- Cognitive Learning without emotions is an empty shell with Hindustan Times
- Artificial Intelligence in education: Who should be the custodian of the new gold? with cnbctv18
- International Youth Day: we need to give young people a voice in decision-making with The Guardian
- Moving From Transmissive Pedagogies To Transformative Pedagogies with BWEDUCATION
- Embracing technology to build emotional resilience with france24.com
- How a Global Citizenship Curriculum could create the empathetic citizens we need in future to save the world with India Today
- 'Games For Learning' Seeks To Embed Social And Emotional Learning Skills In (15+) Learners Through Digital Games with BWEDUCATION
- How Gandhi can help Gen Z with The Hill
- Gaming and Gandhi: How to Save our Educational Systems with News18
- Education: Global citizenship for human flourishing with Open Access Government
- Open dialogue in schools is the first step in fighting violent extremism with The Guardian
