= Bloons =

Video game series by Ninja Kiwi

- Screenshot of the original Bloons game
- Genre: Puzzle video game
- Developer: Ninja Kiwi
- Publisher: Ninja Kiwi
- Platform: Web browser: Android, DSi, iOS, PSP, Wii
- First release: Bloons: WW: March 2007
- Latest release: Bloons Blitz: WW: September 2026
- Spin-offs: Bloons Tower Defense

Bloons is a video game franchise developed by Ninja Kiwi. The games involve players using monkeys, often armed with various tools, weapons, and machines, to pop as many "bloons" (balloons) as possible. They include the Bloons series, the Bloons Tower Defense series, and several other spin-offs. Most of the earlier Bloons games are browser-based games that use Adobe Flash Player, although some are available on other platforms. Mobile games based on the Bloons series are distributed through the App Store, Google Play, and some through Steam. Although now unavailable on Ninja Kiwi's website, Flash-based games older than BTD6 are available on the Ninja Kiwi Archive.

== Development ==
The traditional "Balloon and Dart" carnival game provided the inspiration for the original Bloons game.

The first Bloons game was developed by Stephen and Chris Harris, two brothers from New Zealand. Prior to working on Bloons, the pair had released Cash Sprint – a successful racing game that incorporated weekly prizes. After the success of Cash Sprint, they developed their own web portal for flash games, but failed to gain the necessary traffic. Instead they decided to focus on their own games, and launched a website – Ninjakiwi.com – with five of their own games. The site was a success, and this led to their work on Bloons.

The basic concept for Bloons came from Stephen's wife. When Stephen asked her what would be fun in a new game, she brought up carnival games with darts and balloons. The first version was developed quickly, and the game was released on March 27, 2007. It proved popular, especially after being picked up by Digg, and soon reaching approximately 100,000 players per day. By 2012 the game had been played 1.5 billion times.

Release timeline Main series entries in bold
2007	**Bloons**
2007	More Bloons
2007	Bloons Player Pack
2007	**Bloons Tower Defense**
2007	Bloons Player Pack 2
2007	**Bloons Tower Defense 2**
2008	Bloons Player Pack 3
2008	Even more Bloons
2008	Bloons Player Pack 4
2008	**Bloons Tower Defense 3**
2008	Hot Air Bloon
2008	Bloons Player Pack 5: Christmas Ed
2009	**Bloons TD 4**
2009	Bloons Festive Fun
2009	Bloons Blast
2010	**Bloons 2**
2010	Bloons Super Monkey
2011	Who Wants To Be A Bloonionaire?
2011	**Bloons TD 5**
2012	**Bloons TD Battles**
2013	Bloons Super Monkey 2
2014	Bloons Monkey City
2015
2016	Bloons Super Monkey 2 iOS
2017
2018	**Bloons TD 6**
2018	Bloons Adventure Time TD
2019
2020
2021	Bloons Pop!
2021	**Bloons TD Battles 2**
2022
2023
2024	Bloons Card Storm
2025
2026	Bloons Blitz

== Games ==
=== Bloons ===
The Bloons series is the original grouping of games developed under the "Bloons" name. In all of the main games, the goal is for the player to clear the playing area of all Bloons (which, as implied, have similar traits to balloons) using a limited number of darts. The player is able to choose the power, aim, and other factors involving the launch of darts; and hence the path it will follow and what Bloons it will pop. There are many sequels and spin-offs of this series, with large fan support (indicated by the "player packs" discussed later).

==== Gameplay ====
The games consist of various levels, each with a different and unique layout of Bloons. On each, the player is given several darts used to pop the Bloons on the screen. Score is calculated based on the amount of darts left, and the percentage of total Bloons that were popped. Some Bloons possess special abilities, such as giving an extra dart, or spraying tacks. Blocks of wood, metal, and rubber are also present, often requiring a player to bank shots off a bouncy surface. As new games in the series developed, more and more aspects of the game were expanded upon with many new Bloons and levels being introduced. There are also several "player packs" – groups of levels developed by players of the Bloons series.

==== Games in the series ====
- Bloons
- More Bloons
- Even More Bloons
- Bloons Insanity Pack
- Bloons Junior
- Bloons 2
- Bloons 2 Christmas Pack
- Bloons 2 Spring Fling
- Bloons Player Pack (1–5)

=== Bloons Tower Defense ===
In the Bloons Tower Defense series (often abbreviated Bloons TD or BTD), the main objective of the game is to pop the enemy Bloons before they reach the end of the path on the game screen. The player has various types of towers available to defend against the Bloons, such as Dart Monkeys, Tack Shooters, and the powerful Super Monkey. There are also other types of towers introduced in later editions of the series, such as Ninja Monkeys and Monkey Buccaneers, the latter of which could only be placed on water.

Most towers can be purchased and upgraded with in-game money, which is earned through various means. In earlier games, the only way of acquiring money was to pop the Bloons, but starting in BTD4, the Banana Farm was introduced. The fifth and sixth games further broaden options of "farming"(generating money), introducing upgrades such as the Merchantmen.

There are many types of Bloons, the Red Bloon being the weakest; the tougher variants each contain one or more weaker ones, released when the containing Bloon is popped. For example, the Green Bloon contains a Blue Bloon, which contains a Red Bloon. Depending on the difficulty and version of the game, the player has a certain number of "lives" available. Different types of Bloons consume different numbers of lives if they escape, based on the total number of Bloons contained inside. Some Bloons have special attributes. Lead Bloons are immune to sharp things, black Bloons are immune to bombs, and white Bloons are immune to ice. There are also special types of Bloons, such as the infamous "MOAB-class" bloons (Massive Ornary Air Blimp, sometimes called "Mother Of All Bloons" although that is incorrect according to a note before round 38 in BTD3), where the Bloon resembles an airship and takes many hits to defeat, an example being the ZOMG or BFB (Zeppelin Of Mighty Gargantuanness and Brutal Floating Behemoth, respectively). In general, the newer games have had more Bloon and tower types.

Before starting a game, a player is given the option to select a map and difficulty modifier of their choosing. Starting in BTD4, more modes would be introduced. For example, Deflation gives the player a significant amount of cash, but they are unable to earn cash by any means once the game starts.

Bloons TD 6 is the latest installment in the main Bloons Tower Defense series, but Bloons Tower Defense Battles 2, a multiplayer-based spinoff, is the most recent game overall.

==== Bloons Monkey City ====
Bloons Monkey City is a free multi-platform game that combines the traditional Bloons TD with a city builder. Capturing more plots allows the player to place more buildings. Some buildings require specific tiles. The buildings cost in-game money, which are acquired from different buildings and by capturing tiles. Windmills and watermills create energy that is used by the player's other buildings. Leveling up allows the player to make more buildings and cities. Bloonstones, another valuable in-game resource, are used to unlock the strongest upgrades for towers. Plots further away from the starting tiles tend to have stronger bloons, and some plots contain chests, which give a permanent reward when the plot is captured.

=== Bloons Super Monkey ===
Bloons Super Monkey (often abbreviated as BSM) is the second Bloons spin-off series to date; it is a bullet hell RPG with three installations so far.

The objective of the game is to move a super monkey that shoots a stream of darts to pop bloons. Popping them gives the player power blops, which are used to buy upgrades. If the monkey fails to pop the required amount of bloons for a certain level, the game is over. The super monkey wields weapons, which can be upgraded or replaced with a different weapon.

The first game, Bloons Super Monkey, was released on Ninja Kiwi's website in February 2010. In May 2013, a sequel, Bloons Super Monkey 2, was released on the same website. In November 2016, a refined version of Bloons Super Monkey 2 was released on the iOS App Store and Android Play Store for download.

=== Spin-offs ===
==== Bloons Pop! ====
Bloons Pop! is a spin-off mobile game of the main Bloons series that incorporates elements of the Bloons TD series, mainly Bloons TD6, with puzzle gameplay. It expands on the gameplay of the Bloons series with power-ups, merge mechanics, and a town building system.

==== Bloons Card Storm ====
Bloons Card Storm released on October 28, 2024. It is based on the towers from Bloons TD 6 and turns them into cards (similar to the card mode from Bloons TD Battles). It expands and adds on to the card mode from Bloons TD Battles and adds a modern twist with new towers and also add the heroes introduced in Bloons TD 6 along with the new hero Amelia the Amazing.

==== Bloons Blitz ====
Bloons Blitz is a bullet heaven game featuring characters from the Bloons Tower Defense series, in which the player maneuvers a group of auto-firing monkeys to defend against waves of Bloons. It was released worldwide on September 30, 2026.

==== Other games ====
- In Hot Air Bloon, users must pop as many Bloons as possible without crashing into obstacles on their (as the name says) hot air bloon . Players have the option to save their scores to the High Score List with an existing Mochi Games account.
- In Who Wants to Be a Bloonionaire, users answer ten questions in a similar style to Who Wants to Be a Millionaire? with two hints. If they are all answered correctly, then a trailer of Bloons TD 5 is shown.
- In Bloons Pop 3 (unrelated to Bloons Pop!), users are put in a game very similar to Candy Crush Saga, where they must match 3 of the same color bloon together in order to pop them.

== Reception ==
Aggregate review scores
Game	Year	Metacritic
Bloons	2009 2010	PSP: 68/100 Wii: 21/100
Bloons TD 4	2009	iOS: 69/100
Bloons TD 5	2012	iOS: 79/100
Bloons TD Battles	2012	iOS: 78/100

Tech media website CNET reported favorably on the Bloons Tower Defense games for iPhone, describing it as having "nearly everything from the beloved Web-based classic". The article reflects negatively on the controls, stating that "[they] are a little finicky", but overall their impression is positive, saying that the game is an ideal introduction to the tower defense genre for young children.

== See also ==
- Circus
