= Gametraders =

Australian entertainment retailer

- Type: Private
- Industry: Video and Computer Games
- Founded: 2001
- Founder: Mark Langford
- Headquarters: Adelaide, South Australia, Australia
- Number of locations: 10 stores Australia wide (as of March 2020)
- Key people: Mark Langford (Managing Director, Founder)
- Products: Games, DVDs, Consoles, Toys, Music, Clothing, Collectables
- Services: Buying, Selling, Trading of video games, accessories and toys
- Owner: Mark Langford
- Number of employees: 100+
- Website: http://www.gametraders.com.au

Gametraders is an Australian retailer of computer and video games, accessories, anime DVDs and toys. The company was founded in 2001 by Mark Langford, and as of September 2022 they have 8 stores across Australia, after a large amount of store closures (at one stage around 46 stores).

== Products ==
Gametraders is a retail business with stores across Australia, selling video games and related products including consoles, accessories, pre played games, pre played consoles, toys, collectables, posters, and T-shirts. They are one of the few Australian game retailers specialising in the sale of retro games and consoles that are no longer widely available. Gametraders is currently the only retail chain in Australia that trades consoles and games of any type, whereas other retail chains only deal in current generation video games and consoles and last generation consoles and games. For this reason, Gametraders has become a popular choice for video game collectors in Australia. Gametraders also sells anime DVDs, manga, strategy guides, video game related T-shirts and weapon replicas. Some stores also specialise in the sale of Pop vinyl figurines. Gametraders have also embraced trading cards games Yu-Gi-Oh, Magic the Gathering, Pokémon, World of Warcraft and others, some stores hosting weekly tournaments.

=== Pre-Played ===
A large amount of Gametraders' sales comes from its ‘Pre-Played’ range, which consists of consoles and games traded in by consumers for cash or store credit. Gametraders accepts trade-ins of any game, regardless of what console it was designed for, and is the only retail chain in Australia that sells games from any gaming console, including the Atari 2600, Commodore 64, Amiga, NES, Game Boy and many other consoles that are now unsupported by most stores.
