= Metia Interactive =

- Company type: Privately Owned
- Industry: Video games
- Founded: 2003
- Headquarters: Auckland, New Zealand
- Key people: Maru Nihoniho
- Website: www.metia.co.nz

Metia Interactive (/ˈmiːtjə/ MEE-tyə) is a game development studio based in Auckland, New Zealand. They are a member of the NZGDA. Metia Interactive specialises in designing and creating game art assets, including modelling and texturing, as well as pre-rendered and realtime animations.

Metia is a licensed developer for the Sony PlayStation Portable. Their PlayStation Portable title, Cube, was awarded Runner Up for Best Unsigned Game (Professional) at the Australian Game Developers Conference, 2005. Cube is being published by D3 Publisher. The game features sound and music by New Zealand electronica band, Pitch Black.

Metia also has a joint venture with Film Factory New Zealand to work on Guardian Maia, which additional to the game, has a feature film in development.

== Games developed ==
- Cube: 3D Puzzle Mayhem - PSP
- SPARX - PC
- Count My Cube - iOS/Android
- Takaro - iOS/Android
- Waehere - iOS/Android
