= Game Connect =

Game Connect: Asia Pacific (GCAP) is Australia’s annual game development conference and networking event for the Asia Pacific Games Industry and is administered by the Interactive Games and Entertainment Association.

== See also ==
- Australian Game Developers Conference
