= AlphaSim =

Flight simulation addon developer

- Type: Limited company
- Industry: Video games
- Founded: June 1999
- Founder: Phil Perrott
- Defunct: August 18, 2010
- Fate: Defunct
- Headquarters: Bay of Plenty, New Zealand (final), Rhoose Point, United Kingdom (original)
- Products: Flight Simulator Addons
- Website: http://www.alphasim.co.uk/

AlphaSim was a flight-simulation addon developer, based in the Bay of Plenty, New Zealand founded in June 1999. The company was well known throughout the flight simulation community for their numerous highly detailed & realistic military simulation products. They developed both aircraft and scenery for the Microsoft Flight Simulator series. AlphaSim was renowned for developing often-niche aircraft as well as mainstream interests. On 18 August 2010, AlphaSim announced "[We have] ceased trading. Due to circumstances beyond our control, this site will no longer be selling FS addons."

The website has now been shut down, and many workers from the AlphaSim team have founded a new company called Virtavia. Virtavia sells FSX addons through their own site, and third party vender sites such as Flight1.com.

The AlphaSim logo had evolved over the years. The final logo was an aircraft creating an Alpha symbol with a smoke trail which was created in 2005.

== Products ==
- Hawker Hunter
- MH-53 Pave Low
- AH-64A Apache
- T-6 Texan
- Admiral Kuznetsov
- RAF Leuchars
- Lockheed SR-71 Blackbird
- Lockheed C-130 Hercules
- Republic F-105 Thunderchief
- Consolidated B-24 Liberator
- English Electric Lightning
- Panavia Tornado
- Convair F-106 Delta Dart
- English Electric Canberra
- A-6E Intruder/EA-6B Prowler
- B-1 Lancer
- Bristol Blenheim
- Heinkel He 111
- Mikoyan-Gurevich MiG-25
- B-47 Stratojet
