= Swing Racers =

2015 video game

- Developer: Morepork Games
- Publisher: Morepork Games
- Engine: Unreal Engine 3
- Platform: iOS
- Release: App Store: WW: June 17, 2015
- Genre: Racing
- Mode: Single-player

Swing Racers is a 3D racing video game developed and published by Morepork Games. It was released on June 17, 2015, for iOS and is available worldwide on the iOS App Store. Upon release, the game was included in the App Store's "Best New Games" list.

== Gameplay ==
Swing Racers uses touch-screen-centric controls, where the player must hold the screen in order to "pull" their car around various household environments with a rubber band. Various pickups can be used to dispatch opponents. Additional cars and rubber bands can be unlocked, which alter the speed and handling for the player.

== Reception ==
Swing Racers, according to the developer website, reached number 1 Racing Game on the iOS App Store in 39 countries, including UK, Australia, France, Germany, Italy and Japan. Swing Racers received a score of 4/5 from AppleNApps, who write "Swing Racers is an all new way to race that is easy to recommend". AppGemeinde also scored the game 4/5. Both praised the game's innovative controls while stating that it could do with more tracks. The game received significant publicity in New Zealand, with articles on Stuff.co.nz and The New Zealand Herald website.
