= Path of Exile =

Online action role-playing game

- Developer: Grinding Gear Games
- Publisher: Grinding Gear Games
- Designers: Chris Wilson; Mark Roberts
- Programmer: Jonathan Rogers
- Artist: Erik Olofsson
- Writers: Nick Jones; Edwin McRae; Brian Weissman
- Composers: Adgio Hutchings; Kamil Orman-Janowski; Michael James Collier
- Platforms: Windows, Xbox One, PlayStation 4, macOS
- Release: Windows; 23 October 2013; Xbox One; 24 August 2017; PlayStation 4; 26 March 2019; macOS; 18 September 2020
- Genre: Action role-playing
- Modes: Single-player, multiplayer

Path of Exile is a 2013 free-to-play action role-playing video game developed and published by Grinding Gear Games. Following an open beta phase, the game was released for Microsoft Windows in October 23, 2013. A version for Xbox One was released in August 2017, and a PlayStation 4 version was released in March 2019.

Path of Exile takes place in a dark fantasy world, where the government of the island nation of Oriath exiles people to the continent of Wraeclast, a ruined continent home to many ancient gods. Taking control of an exile, players can choose to play as one of seven character classes – Marauder, Duelist, Ranger, Shadow, Witch, Templar, and Scion. Players are then tasked with fighting their way back to Oriath, defeating ancient gods and great evils during their journey.

A sequel, Path of Exile 2, was released to early access on December 6, 2024. It was originally announced in 2019 as a large update for the original game. In 2023, the studio announced that it would instead be a separate game.

== Gameplay ==
The player controls a single character from an isometric perspective and explores large outdoor areas and caves or dungeons, battling monsters and fulfilling quests from non-player characters (NPCs) to gain experience points and equipment. The game borrows heavily from the Diablo series, particularly Diablo II, of which Path of Exile has been described as the spiritual successor. All areas aside from the central encampments are procedurally generated for increased re-playability. While all players on a single server can freely mingle in encampments, gameplay outside of encampments is highly instanced, providing every player or party with an isolated map to freely explore.

Players can choose from seven available classes to play as (Duelist, Marauder, Ranger, Scion, Shadow, Templar and Witch). Each of these classes are aligned with one or two of the three core attributes: Strength, Dexterity, or Intelligence. The exception is the Scion, formerly a locked prestige class released in 2013, which is aligned with all three attributes. The different classes are not restricted from investing into skills not aligned with their core attributes, but will have easier access to skills that are aligned with their core attributes. Items are randomly generated from a wide variety of basic types and endowed with special properties and gem sockets. They come in different rarities with increasingly powerful properties. This makes a large part of gameplay dedicated to finding well-balanced and synergistic equipment. Skill gems can be placed in gem sockets of armor, weapons and some types of jewellery, giving them an active skill. As the character advances and levels up, the equipped skill gems also gain experience, allowing the skills themselves to level up and increase in potency.

Active skills can be modified by items known as Support Gems. Depending upon the number of linked sockets the player possesses, a primary attack or skill can be modified with increased attack speed, faster projectiles, multiple projectiles, chaining hits, life leech, auto-cast spells on critical strike, and more. Given limits on the number of sockets, players must prioritize gem usage. All classes share the same selection of 2,268 passive skills from which the player can choose one each time their character levels up, and as an occasional quest reward. These passive skills improve the core attributes and grant further enhancements such as increased mana, life, damage, defences, regeneration, speed, and more. Each one of the characters starts at a different position on the passive skill tree. The passive skill tree is arranged in a complex network starting in separate trunks for each class (aligned with the permutations of the three core attributes). The player must therefore not only focus on maximizing all modifiers related to their primary offence and defense, but must also take care to select the most efficient path through the passive skill tree. As of the 3.0 Fall of Oriath Release, the maximum possible number of passive skill points on a non-Scion character was 123 (99 from levelling and 24 from quest rewards). Each class also has access to an Ascendancy class, which grants much stronger, specialized bonuses. Each class has three Ascendancy classes to choose from. Up to 8 Ascendancy skill points can be assigned out of 12 or 14. As of patch 3.27.0 Keepers of the Flame, Bloodline Ascendancy classes were added which can be paired as a secondary class.

Path of Exile is unusual among action role-playing games in that there is no in-game trading currency. The game's economy is based on bartering "currency items." Unlike traditional game currencies, these items have their own inherent uses (such as upgrading an item's rarity level, rerolling affixes, or improving an item's quality) and thus provide their own money sinks to prevent inflation. Most of these items are used to modify and upgrade equipment, though some identify items, create portals to town or grant skill refund points. Gold was added to the game in patch 3.25.0 Settlers of Kalguur however it cannot be traded with other players and can only be used with NPCs

=== Leagues ===
The game offers several alternate play modes. The following permanent leagues are available:

- Standard – The default gameplay league. Characters who die here respawn in the last city visited (with experience loss at higher levels).
- Hardcore (HC) – Characters cannot be resurrected when they die but instead respawn back in the Standard league. This mode is analogous to permadeath in other games.
- Solo Self Found (SSF) – Characters cannot join a party with other players, and may not trade with other players. This type of gameplay forces characters to find or craft their own items.
- Ruthless - Various gameplay changes are added to increase the game's difficulty. Gameplay changes include reduced item drops, removed gameplay and crafting mechanics, and weaker passive skills.

There is also a seasonal Challenge league, with special mechanics that are introduced for the duration of the league. Historically, these changes were small, but now the challenge league coincides with an expansion, with the expansion content being only in the challenge league for the duration of the league. Expansion contents typically include new forms of currencies that players can collect and other features, including but not limited to, new ways where players can also acquire or craft items. There are also Hardcore and Solo Self Found variants of the seasonal challenge league.

Other leagues are usually designed for specific events. They have their own set of rules, item accessibility and aftermath. These rules widely vary depending on the league. For example, timed "Descent" league features another map set, new monster sets and rewards, but characters in this league are no longer available for playing after the league ends. "Turbo solo immolation" leagues, as another example, are running on the same maps as standard modes, but with much harder monsters, no partying, replacing physical damage with fire damage and monsters exploding on death—and return the survivors to Hardcore league (while dead characters resurrect in Standard). Racing leagues last between 30 minutes and 1 week. The permanent leagues have counterpart ladder leagues with different rulesets that last three months.

== Synopsis ==
=== Setting ===
The game is set in a dark fantasy world. The player starts the game waking up on the shores of Wraeclast, a continent that once was the center of a mighty empire but is now a cursed land which serves as a penal colony for criminals and other unwanted individuals from the nearby Island of Oriath. Regardless of the reasons for their exile, players must now face the unforgiving wilderness and its dangerous inhabitants amidst the crumbling ruins and bloody secrets of the Eternal Empire and the Vaal civilization that came before and band together with other exiles to survive.

=== Plot ===
High Templar Dominus exiles the player character, referred to as "Exile," from Oriath for some crime depending on which class the player chose. Exiles are sent to Wraeclast, a penal colony, where they kill various monsters and people who have been tormenting other exiles in Wraeclast. It is discovered that Dominus has been secretly working with his assistant Piety studying thaumaturgy and is the cause of many of the troubles in Wraeclast. The Exile finds and kills both of them. In the process, the Exile encounters a remnant of the Eternal Empire, a woman called Dialla who explains how a thaumaturgical "Rapture Device" created by a man called Malachai is being used to awaken and release "The Beast", the source of a Cataclysm that ravaged Wraeclast centuries prior. The Exile travels to Highgate where they enter the Beast and kill Malachai.

Now that Wraeclast is apparently saved, the Exile returns to Oriath. The successor to Dominus, High Templar Avarius, has been abusing his ordained power of divinity. The corrupt templars are exercising their power to wrest control of Oriath, enslaving a race of people known as Karui. The Exile takes advantage of the ongoing Karui slave rebellion and overthrows the templar order by killing Avarius and defeating the Templar god "Innocence". After defeating Innocence, his brother Sin returns and informs the Exile that by killing the Beast, the Exile has inadvertently caused the old gods of the world to reawaken. The formerly oppressed Karui, now empowered by their god Kitava, are running rampant in Oriath, destroying whatever they can find. Sin takes the Exile to fight Kitava, but the Exile fails. Sin explains that the essence of the Beast is needed to battle Kitava - and that the Beast was his creation. A plan is formulated to return to Wraeclast to extract the essence from the Beast's dead body and use it to stop Kitava from destroying Oriath.

After travelling through Wraeclast once more and defeating the gods that have reawakened, the Exile returns to Oriath and finds that Innocence has returned. With Innocence reborn and amending for his past mistakes, Sin and Innocence take the Exile to Kitava's lair, and with their combined strength they destroy Kitava.

== Development ==
Path of Exile began when a small group of action role-playing game enthusiasts became frustrated by the lack of new releases in the genre and decided to develop their own game. It was developed under the radar for three years before being publicly announced on 1 September 2010. In the time since then, Grinding Gear Games has published a number of development posts on their website ranging from screenshots of new classes, monsters, and skills to presentations of gameplay or technical aspects.

The game's lead designer at that time, was Chris Wilson. He said the team drew inspiration from several earlier games, including action role-playing games such as the Diablo series (particularly Diablo II), Titan Quest, and Dungeon Siege, the collectible card game Magic: The Gathering, the massively multiplayer online role-playing game Guild Wars, and the role-playing video game franchise Final Fantasy (particularly the Materia system of Final Fantasy VII and the Sphere Grid system of Final Fantasy X).

Alpha started around June 2010, and ended when 0.9.0 was released in August 2011. Following a period under closed beta which players could pay to join, the developers started an open beta (ver. 0.10.0) on 23 January 2013 which was free to play with purchasable microtransactions. The game was patched for release version 1.0.0 on 23 October 2013. On this date, it was also made available on Steam. The game continues to be updated with new content and fixes on roughly a monthly basis.

The developers of Path of Exile stated that one of their core goals is to provide a genuinely free-to-play game financed only by "ethical micro-transactions". Players can create multiple accounts and even have more than one logged in at a time. Path of Exile mainly offers cosmetic item skins for players willing to spend money on the game, but it does also gate specific account features such as semi-automated public trading inventories or additional character slots (beyond the default maximum of 24) behind a paywall. It is also possible for players to pay to create private, invite-only leagues, each secluded in its own economy. On 18 January 2017, Grinding Gear Games announced they would be expanding into the console market.

During closed beta, by 21 January 2013, Path of Exile received US$2.2 million in crowd-sourced contributions.

During Exilecon in November 2019, Grinding Gear Games announced that a version of the game for mobile devices was also in development within their studio. One of the main topics discussed in the reveal video was the current trend in free-to-play mobile business models (such as "pay-to-win microtransactions, time gates, energy bars, random nag screens, notifications, video ads") and that POE Mobile would aim to avoid that approach, and retain the full gameplay of the desktop version. However, it was also stated that the mobile version was "experimental" and that continued development will be dependent upon the feedback from fans.

The game started with DirectX graphic rendering which supports a wide array of video cards. During Delirium league, February 2020, Grinding Gear Games (GGG) released a beta support version of Vulkan graphic rendering with the goal of providing more consistent game play and to collect feedback from players to improve the new mode through bug reports. Vulkan support implementation provided a smoother experience, reducing the number of times the games frames-per-second would drop or bottom out during high intensity game play. Vulkan beta support continued into Harvest with updates at the start of the league but negatively affected performance. Another release late into the Harvest league with 300+ changes that affects both DirectX and Vulkan beta support are still waiting for feedback.

In September 2020 through patch 3.11.2, Grinding Gear Games released a substantial code quality refactoring which required a full game download to deploy. The release includes optimized future game patching for stand-alone and Steam game store versions, game file storage which improves HDD game load time, compressed and sharper texture quality, audio quality improvements, graphic engine improvements, a first-ever Apple macOS version release and Epic Game Store version release.

=== Expansions ===
Patch	Title	Release date	Notes	
1.0	Path of Exile (full release)	23 October 2013	In October 2013, Path of Exile officially launched leaving what had been Open Beta, the launch was an expansion that changed the shape of the game. Originally Open Beta version 0.10.0 in January 2013 marked the point where Path of Exile was opened to the public as a free-to-play game. Halfway through the Open Beta the first pair of Challenge Leagues were released Anarchy and Onslaught, with the official launch of the game new Challenge Leagues launched alongside the release Domination and Nemesis. The launch of the game introduced the second half of Act 3 (six new world areas) and made Dominus the final boss of the game, it introduced the seventh character class the Scion and more.	
1.1	Sacrifice of the Vaal	5 March 2014	Path of Exile's first digital expansion, Sacrifice of the Vaal, was released on 5 March 2014. The expansion included new bosses, currency, areas, Ambush and Invasion leagues, and PvP modes. Shrines from Domination and Nemesis mods on monsters have been added to the core game.	
1.2 and 1.3	Forsaken Masters	20 August 2014	The second expansion, Forsaken Masters, was announced on 31 July 2014 and released on 20 August 2014. It comes with a host of new features, including crafting, recruitable NPCs called Masters (who remain at the player's hideout offering them daily training missions and specialized items), customized personal hideouts, reworked passive skill tree, new gems, Beyond and Rampage were leagues in 1.2, former Ambush and Invasion content added to core game and more. The next major patch, 1.3, was considered part of the expansion, which adds another NPC, the PVP Master, Leo, new leagues Bloodlines and Torment, new gems and more. Former Rampage and Beyond content added to the core game.	
2.0	The Awakening	10 July 2015	The Awakening, entered closed beta on 20 April 2015 and was fully released on 10 July 2015. It includes the addition of a fourth Act containing new map tilesets, quests, and monsters. Other additions include new skills and items, passive skill tree sockets and jewels, item filters, two new challenge leagues, and game balance. Also an optional "Lockstep" mode was added in an effort to fix the desync network synchronization issues at the cost of latency. The two new challenge leagues were Warbands and Tempest. Bloodlines and Torment content was added to the core game.	
2.1	Talisman	11 December 2015	The expansion update added the Standard and Hardcore version of the Talisman challenge leagues, the first league to be shared across Standard and Hardcore instead of there being two leagues in parallel. It was the start of a rough three-month expansion schedule for the game. This update also added twelve new gems.	
2.2	Ascendancy	4 March 2016	The expansion included more than the usual new items and new skills adding 19 ascendancy classes. This expansion was also timed to be made live at the same time as the Perandus challenge leagues. The ascendancy classes are each tied to one of the base classes, with three ascendancy classes for each base class, except the Scion which only has one ascendancy class. Each of these new classes contains its own unique ascendancy skill tree to advance. These new skill trees are much smaller than the base classes full-blown passive trees, but provide a unique specification to one's class not previously seen in the game.	
2.3	Prophecy	3 June 2016	The expansion introduced the Prophecy league, it also introduced the Endgame Labyrinth, five new skills and more.	
2.4	Atlas of Worlds	2 September 2016	The expansion introduced a new end-game, 30 new maps and 19 new bosses. Also started the three-month Essence challenge league. Previous Prophecy league system added to the core game.	
2.5	Breach	2 December 2016	The expansion introduced the Breach league. Essence league content added to the core game.	
2.6	Legacy	3 March 2017	The expansion featured the Legacy challenge leagues that paid homage to the leagues and items of the past.	
3.0	Fall of Oriath	4 August 2017	The expansion added six new acts and was the largest expansion released to date. The expansion replaced cruel and merciless difficulties with Acts V-X. A new Character Selection Screen was added. A help panel has been created for players to use as well as eight new Vaal side areas with new bosses. There is also a new passive skill tree planning system. There are three new skill gems and numerous support gems added as well. 24 new unique items have been added, five of them being designed by supporters of the game. The areas of the first five acts are revisited with changes to the environment that were the result of the players' actions. The Pantheon system has also been added, where a player can obtain interchangeable buffs from boss gods found in the new content. The associated league of 3.0 patch is Harbinger. Breach added in maps by default.	
3.1	War for the Atlas	8 December 2017	The expansion was revealed on 16 November 2017, and released on 8 December 2017. It focused on overhauling the "Atlas of Worlds" end-game system, adding 32 new maps, as well as other new items including ten new gems. Alongside the expansion, the Abyss challenge league was introduced.	
3.2	Bestiary	3 February 2018	The expansion added the Bestiary league, the uber elder encounter, new gems and more. Abyss was added to the core game.	
3.3	Incursion	6 June 2018	A Vaal-themed expansion that features the Incursion league, new gems and reworked twenty existing gems.	
3.4	Delve	31 August 2018	The expansion features an infinite dungeon and socketable currency items, new skill gems and more.	
3.5	Betrayal	7 December 2018	The Betrayal expansion and league was revealed on 13 November 2018, and was released on 7 December 2018. The Betrayal expansion offered a rework of in-game systems: the Master, crafting system as well as other content. The leagues Bestiary, Incursion and the Delve became permanent mechanics in the Betrayal expansion.	
3.6	Synthesis	8 March 2019	The expansion contains the Synthesis challenge league, new gems, a complete rebalance of spells, an integrated version of the Betrayal league and more.	
3.7	Legion	7 June 2019	The expansion contains the Legion challenge league, new gems, a game-wide overhaul of melee combat and more.	
3.8	Blight	6 September 2019	The expansion contains the Blight challenge league, three revamped balance archetypes with new skills and support gems, integration of Legion and the boss fights from Synthesis into the core game and more.	
3.9	Conquerors of the Atlas	13 December 2019	The expansion overhauled the end-game system. It also shipped with bow attack rebalance and new bow skills. At the same time, the temporary league of 3.9 would be Metamorph. Blight mechanics added to the core game.	
3.10	Delirium	13 March 2020	The expansion contains the Delirium challenge league, the new Cluster Jewel system, new skills and support gems, new unique items, and further improvements to the Atlas endgame. Metamorph mechanics added to the core game.	
3.11	Harvest	19 June 2020	The Harvest adds a new NPC named Oshabi who is cultivating the Sacred Grove where you plant seeds, grow them into monsters and kill them for items, crafting, and life force. The expansion adds new crafting options, eight new skills, two new support gems, revamps of Two-handed Weapons, Warcry skills, Brands, Slams and the Passive Skill Tree itself. In addition, twelve new unique items were introduced, as well as a rebalancing of over fifty existing ones. Former Delirium league integrated to the core game.	
3.12	Heist	18 September 2020	The expansion introduced Heist league as well as other features such as rework of curse and "Steel" skills that can be use by in-game player character. The studio also started the public beta access of their MacOS port. The Heist mechanic of the league, which was added to the core game in 3.13, introduced the ability to hire combat NPC to perform a special role in a heist, as well as a new unique item subset called "Replica" and new skill gem that have an alternative skill effect.	
3.13	Echoes of the Atlas	16 January 2021	The Echoes of the Atlas expansion reworked the end game "Atlas of Worlds" system by introducing regional atlas passive skill trees, 11 new end-game map areas and a new end-game pinnacle boss, the Maven. The patch also reworked some of the Ascendancy character classes as well as a new end-game mechanic, Maven's Invitation, that deals with fighting multiple bosses at the same time. The associated temporary league of the patch is Ritual, which introduced new item basetypes. Versions of former leagues Harvest and Heist are incorporated into the core game.	
3.14	Ultimatum	16 April 2021	The expansion introduced the Ultimatum league as well as overhauling the loot of past leagues' content that was incorporated into the core game in the past. Ritual was also added to the core game.	
3.15	Expedition	23 July 2021	The expansion contains the Expedition challenge league, four new NPC traders, nineteen new skill and support gems, a massive balance changes to make the game more challenging, including a full rework of the flask system and more	
3.16	Scourge	22 October 2021	The expansion contains the Scourge challenge league, a rework to the passive skill tree including the addition of Passive Skill Masteries, new skill gems, the Expedition league going core, retiring the Perandus league, improvements to the Atlas endgame, new guild features and more.	
3.17	Siege of the Atlas	4 February 2022	In the expansion two new Eldritch Horrors threaten to consume the Atlas of Worlds. Join Commander Kirac's militia and defend the Atlas and Wraeclast itself against these celestial foes. This large endgame expansion contains new Atlas systems, pinnacle bosses, one gigantic Atlas passive skill tree, Eldritch implicit endgame crafting, new unique items, the Archnemesis challenge league, the Prophecy mechanic is removed from the game with many rewards moved to other content and much more.	
3.18	Sentinel	13 May 2022	The expansion contains the Sentinel challenge league, 20 atlas keystone passives, seven uber version boss fights, new pinnacle unique items, revamped monster modifiers taken from the Archnemesis league mechanics and some Bloodlines and Nemesis mechanics which are removed as leagues from the core game, game controller support and more.	
3.19	Lake of Kalandra	19 August 2022	The expansion contains the Kalandra challenge league, Atlas Memories new endgame content, four new gems, revised Archnemesis mods, revamped Beyond with the monsters and bosses from Scourge, changes to Harvest, a new unique map with the Trialmaster from Ultimatum, a variety of balance changes and more.	
3.20	The Forbidden Sanctum	9 December 2022	The expansion contains the Sanctum challenge league, two new Skill Gems, significant balance changes, two new Atlas Memories themed around Domination and Bestiary, replacing the Archnemesis monster mod system and Ruthless an optional challenging new way to play Path of Exile with extreme item scarcity, limited crafting and other changes.	
3.21	Crucible	7 April 2023	The expansion contains the Crucible challenge league where weapons can be imbued with powerful Passive Skill Trees of their own, a new skill gem and 3 support gems, as well as improvements and revamps of existing endgame systems.	
3.22	Trial of the Ancestors	18 August 2023	The expansion contains the Trial of the Ancestors challenge league where players compete in tournaments against ten tribes in the Karui afterlife to earn valuable rewards. Players use silver coins to enter the afterlife and strategically assemble teams to battle other tribes' chieftains. The league includes exclusive new unique rewards like Passive Tree Tattoos and Omens. Also added are 16 new Atlas keystones, revamped Guardian and Chieftain Ascendancy classes, 14 new support gems, and Sanctum integrated to the core game.	
3.23	Affliction	8 December 2023	The expansion contains the Affliction challenge league, three new Wildwood Ascendancy classes, over a hundred new Transfigured Gems (a new system of alternative versions of existing skill gems that have different functionality), integrating Ultimatum into the core game, removal of Metamorph, and more.	
3.24	Necropolis	29 March 2024	The expansion contains the Necropolis challenge league, new Transfigured Gems, new Support Gems, a new tier of endgame difficulty with 5 new tier 17 maps with new bosses as a way to access the game's 7 hardest uber boss fights, a plethora of changes to the endgame, and more.	
3.25	Settlers of Kalguur	26 July 2024	The expansion contains the Settlers of Kalguur challenge league building the town of Kingsmarch, a new trade market system for currency, balance improvements including two ascendancy class changes, endgame improvements, some additions to the campaign and some quality of life features.	
3.26	Secrets of the Atlas	13 June 2025	The expansion contains the Mercenaries of Trarthus challenge league, where players can hire Mercenaries by challenging them to a duel. This expansion adds a new Eagon and Zana storyline, new Originator-influenced maps that share the layout of tier 16 maps, and modifiers from tier 17, a reworked Betrayal league mechanic, new currency items, over 20 new unique items, a lot of quality of life features, and Kingsmarch integrated into the core game.	
3.27	Keepers of the Flame	31 October 2025	The expansion contains the Keepers of the Flame challenge league, which is a sequel to the original Breach league, 6 new Skill Gems and 2 new Support Gems, secondary Bloodline ascendancy classes (which share ascendancy points with your standard ascendancy class), over 20 new unique items, uber variants of the 3 pinnacle bosses from Secrets of the Atlas, endgame balance changes, a rework of the Assassin ascendancy class, quality of life features and the asynchronous trade system from Path of Exile 2.	
3.28	Mirage	6 March 2026	The expansion contains the Mirage challenge league, where players confront the Afarud, a rogue sect of the Faridun who sap the energies of captured Djinn, while aiding a legendary Maraketh Sekhema to end an ancient war. The patch includes a major rework of the Atlas of Worlds featuring the new Astral Realm (mirrored map copies with Djinn Wishes), Memory Vaults, reworked region shaping, and Nightmare Maps. It adds the Reliquarian ascendancy for the Scion, over 40 new Exceptional Support Gems, 7 new skill gems, and 3 new Incarnation bosses. Keepers of the Flame is integrated into the core game, while Harbinger is removed as a league mechanic.	
3.29	Curse of the Allflame	24 July 2026	The expansion contains the Curse of the Allflame challenge league, where players explore the ocean floor aboard the ship The Sovereign with corsair captain Valerie, discovering sunken treasures, completing Voyages and using Ducats to modify items. The expansion also brings back the Mercenaries of Trarthus, introduces the new Luminary ascendancy class for the Scion, significantly reworks Abyss and Legion, adds a new Abyss pinnacle boss, new Exceptional Skill Gems, and Atlas Anomalies.	
3.30	Covens of Umbra	13 November 2026	The expansion contains the *Covens of Umbra* challenge league, where players disrupt the rituals of covenites summoning the Coven Queen, choosing Fates to empower area bosses and collecting their Viscera to enhance a personal Wickerman. The expansion introduces a major overhaul of the Atlas passive tree, replaces Scarabs with the new Threads of Creation system, significantly reworks existing endgame league mechanics, adds a major loot system rework, integrates Mirage into the core game, and introduces new unique items and other improvements.	-

== Reception ==
Reception

Aggregate score
Aggregator	Score
Metacritic	PC: 86/100; XONE: 83/100

Review scores
Publication	Score
Destructoid	9/10
Eurogamer	7/10
Game Informer	8/10
GameSpot	9/10
GameStar	84/100
IGN	8.8/10
MeriStation	9/10
PC Gamer (US)	84/100 (2014); 90/100 (2018)
PC Games (DE)	9/10
RPGamer	5/5
RPGFan	88/100

Path of Exile received "generally favorable reviews" according to review aggregator website Metacritic. Critics praised the innovations to the action role-playing systems from its predecessors such as the Diablo series. Destructoid's Patrick Hancock praised the world design, remarking that it "has a grimy, grungy, uncomfortable feel to it that constantly makes the player feel slightly off just for inhabiting it".

Kyle Hillard of Game Informer was critical on how the game "throws a lot at you with little direction", adding that "the experience is not friendly to newcomers". Eurogamer was not impressed by the graphics and presentation, saying that "Path of Exile doesn't have Torchlight 2's sense of style or Diablo 3's polish".

Path of Exile was named 2013 PC Game of the Year by GameSpot, and best PC role-playing game of 2013 by IGN. By February 2014, the game had five million registered players. IGN's Leif Johnson remarked how Path of Exile was "into far darker territory than I'd seen in other contemporary action-RPGs".

In 2020, it won the award for "Best Evolving Game" at the 16th British Academy Games Awards.

== Legacy ==
A sequel, Path of Exile 2, was released through early access for Windows, PlayStation 5 and Xbox Series X and Series S on December 6, 2024.
