= Mahatma Gandhi Institute of Education for Peace and Sustainable Development =

Educational Institute

- Abbreviation: MGIEP
- Formation: 2009
- Director: Prof. Obijiofor Aginam
- Parent organization: UNESCO in the Asia Pacific
- Website: Official website

The Mahatma Gandhi Institute of Education for Peace (MGIEP) was established in New Delhi, India, in 2009. It is a UNESCO Research Institute for Asia–Pacific.

== History ==
In 2009, the UNESCO General Conference decided to set up an institute focused on education about sustainable development in the Asia–Pacific region. In 2012, the former Director-General of UNESCO, Irina Bokova, and the former President of India, Pranab Mukherjee, launched this institute. Initially, a two-member team operated out of the UNESCO office in New Delhi. The team has expanded to over 35 members and works out of its independent office in central New Delhi. The director of the institute is Prof. Obijiofor Aginam.

== Programs ==
UNESCO MGIEP's programs focus on social and emotional learning in education systems (K–12) and putting youth (18–34 years of age) at the center of the 2030 agenda for sustainable development in order to achieve SDG 4.7.

=== Policy Interventions ===
The Institute develops policy recommendations based on its research and stakeholder engagement.

=== FramerSpace ===
FramerSpace is UNESCO MGIEP's online co-creation platform that supports the creation of online courses and connects learners to peers through artificial intelligence. The platform is GDPR compliant.

== Events ==
=== World Youth Conference on Kindness ===
The first World Youth Conference on Kindness was held in 2019 in New Delhi, India, in commemoration of Mahatma Gandhi's 150th birth anniversary. The President of India, Shri Ram Nath Kovind inaugurated the conference. A second conference was held on October 24–25, 2020, with the theme "Kindness for Peaceful and Sustainable Co-existence," marking the 75th anniversary of the United Nations.India Education Diary, 27 October 2020

=== Transforming Education Conference for Humanity (TECH) ===
The Transforming Education Conference for Humanity focused on digital pedagogies. The conference was launched in 2017, and held in Visakhapatnam City, State of Andhra Pradesh, India, for 3 years, after which it was held virtually in 2020.

== Publications ==
=== The Blue DOT ===
The BLUE DOT features articles showcasing UNESCO MGIEP's activities and areas of interest.

== Campaigns and initiatives ==
=== #KindnessMatters ===
The #KindnessMatters for the Sustainable Development Goals Campaign was launched on October 2, 2018 (United Nations' International Day of Peace).

=== The International Science and Evidence based Education (ISEE) Assessment ===
The International Science and Evidence based Education (ISEE) Assessment provides inputs to UNESCO's Futures of Education report.
