= Sparx (video game) =

2013 video game

SPARX
- Sparx logo
- Platforms: Computer and mobile
- Release: 25 June 2013
- Genre: Fantasy game
- Mode: Single-player

SPARX (Smart, Positive, Active, Realistic, X-factor thoughts) is a free online computer game intended to help young people with mild to moderate depression, stress or anxiety. Through the game, this e-therapy will teach them how to resolve their issues on their own, according to a talking psychotherapeutic approach called cognitive behavioural therapy. Before taking part in this game, a personality test is required to determine if SPARX will be suited and helpful for the future user.

== Game scenario ==
Based in a 3D fantasy world, the game leads players through seven realms (each lasting between 30 and 40 minutes). At the beginning of SPARX, the user meets the Guide who explains what SPARX is and how it could help. Then the user customizes an avatar and starts to journey within the seven provinces in order to complete different quests. In the first level, gamers challenge GNATS (Gloomy Negative Automatic Thoughts). These GNATS fly towards the avatar and say negative things like, for example: "you're a loser". Further, in the game, the user meets different characters, solves puzzles, and completes mini-games. As soon as a quest is completed, the Guide explains how to use new skills in order to feel better, solve problems, and enjoy real life. Players complete one or two levels in the game each week, during three to seven weeks.

== Development ==
Behind the SPARX project is a team of researchers and clinicians from The University of Auckland. Professor Sally Merry, Dr Karolina Stasiak, Dr Theresa Fleming, Dr Matt Shepherd and Dr Mathijs Lucassen created it. Associate Professor Sally Merry is a child and adolescent Psychiatrist, Head of Department of Psychological Medicine and Director of The Werry Centre for Child and Adolescent Mental Health. Dr Stasiak also coordinated the main study of SPARX. Drs. Fleming, Shepherd and Lucassen carried out doctoral studies of SPARX.

In 2011, SPARX won the World Summit Award, supervised by the United Nations, in the category of e-Health and Environment which honors excellence in multimedia and e-Content creation. SPARX was also rewarded by the 2013 International Digital Award from Netexplo, hosted by UNESCO, for being the first out of ten most innovative and promising digital initiative of the year.

After a such success, in 2012 Dr Lucassen decided to develop another version of SPARX entitled Rainbow SPARX to help adolescents attracted to the same sex, or both sexes, or unsure of their sexuality. According to a small study carried out by Mathijs Lucassen, himself, more than 80% of the participants said that the game helped them to deal with their sexuality, and would recommend it to other people.
