= Ninja Kiwi =

New Zealand video game company

- Type: Subsidiary
- Industry: Video games
- Founded: March 15, 2006; 20 years ago
- Founder: Chris Harris; Stephen Harris
- Headquarters: Auckland, New Zealand
- Products: Bloons
- Number of employees: 70 (2021)
- Parent: Modern Times Group
- Subsidiaries: Digital Goldfish
- Website: ninjakiwi.com

Ninja Kiwi, previously known as Kaiparasoft Ltd, is a New Zealand mobile and online video game developer founded on March 15, 2006, by brothers Chris and Stephen Harris. Ninja Kiwi's first game was a browser-based game called Cash Sprint, developed on the Adobe Flash Platform. Since then, they have produced more than 60 games across platforms including Adobe Flash, Android, iOS, PlayStation Portable, Nintendo DS, and more recently, Steam. Their most well-known titles are the Bloons and Bloons Tower Defense games. In 2012, Ninja Kiwi purchased Digital Goldfish, a Dundee, Scotland-based developer, for an undisclosed sum.

Ninja Kiwi has a virtual currency known as NK Coins; purchases of games and in-game purchases can be transacted using NK Coins. About eighteen months before its dissolution by its parent company, Mochi Media (another major gaming website) discontinued its virtual currency (Mochi Coins) and replaced it with Ninja Kiwi's virtual currency.

Ninja Kiwi was acquired by Modern Times Group on March 24, 2021.

== History ==
Ninja Kiwi Games was founded by Chris and Stephen Harris in 2006. The decision to develop games was brought about by Stephen upon completion of a game design course at the Auckland Media Design School. He had previously graduated at the University of Auckland with a degree in geophysics. The first game that the brothers created was the now-defunct Cash Sprint, a browser-based game where players raced a ghost car and the player with the fastest time each week was rewarded a cash prize. However, they were unable to draw in advertisers to finance the project and were forced to scrap it after 14 weeks of operation. Next, they launched their own web portal that pooled to get developer, Digital Goldfish, who wanted to team up to release Bloons as an iPhone application, where it reached the number two position in the US app store. The relationship between Ninja Kiwi and Digital Goldfish continued long after this, with several members of the Digital Goldfish staff being completely devoted to the mobile development of Ninja Kiwi games.

In 2012, Ninja Kiwi purchased Digital Goldfish. The previous titles that the two companies created together had racked up millions of downloads. Due to the already close relationship between the two companies, the merger was described by Digital Goldfish co-founder, Barry Petrie, as a "natural progressive step in the relationship between the two companies". Digital Goldfish was renamed Ninja Kiwi Europe. The merger increased the total number of Ninja Kiwi employees to 35. By 2021, the total number of employees had increased to 70.

On March 24, 2021, Ninja Kiwi was acquired by Modern Times Group for around 1.6 billion Swedish crowns ($186 million USD), to "broaden its gaming portfolio", with expressed intent to expand into the tower defense genre. The negotiations with MTG began on January 14, 2021, starting with an initial sum of between $130 and $150 million USD. Maria Redlin, MTG's group president and CEO, expressed her interest for acquiring Ninja Kiwi because of how they have created a "successful combination of paid and in-app purchase models in its pricing structure", which she argues is a major factor in Ninja Kiwi's success at creating quality games. The founders of Ninja Kiwi have responded that they are "genuinely excited to join MTG", with intent to join them on creating future business opportunities together. Ninja Kiwi had also announced their plans with MTG over the next year, including releasing Bloons TD Battles 2, the sequel to the multiplayer tower defense game Bloons TD Battles.

== Subsidiaries ==
- Ninja Kiwi Europe (formerly Digital Goldfish) in Dundee, Scotland, was acquired in 2012.
- AutoAttack Games was acquired in April 2024.

== Games ==
=== Bloons Games ===
Bloons was a major breakthrough for Ninja Kiwi. The idea came from developer Stephen Harris' wife, who suggested they make a game similar to the carnival game where people throw darts at balloons. The original Bloons was released in April 2007 under the Kaiparasoft Ltd. label and has spawned many sequels and spinoffs, including the also-successful Bloons TD, Bloons Monkey City and sub-series such as Bloons Super Monkey.

Bloons Pop! is a spin-off mobile game of the main Bloons series that incorporates elements of the Bloons TD series with puzzle gameplay.

=== Bloons TD Games ===
Following the release of Bloons in 2007, the Bloons Tower Defense series also saw its first release in the same year with the game of the same name. Unlike the "aim and shoot" gameplay of Bloons, the Tower Defense games focused on building towers to stop balloons from reaching the exit of the track, with different towers offering different styles of attack. This game was followed by several sequels.

Bloons TD Battles is a multiplayer-oriented version of Bloons TD 5 where the aim of the game is to make the opposing player lose all their lives by sending bloons onto their track, while simultaneously defending your own track against bloons sent by that opposing player. The first person to make the opponent lose all 200 lives wins and gets a battle score/medallions for winning.

Bloons Monkey City is the city-builder version of Bloons TD 5, whereby the player partakes in mini-games of defending against waves of Bloons to capture land and gather additional resources for the city. Players can upgrade their city with new buildings to add extra units that join the battle, unlock upgrades for existing units, or generate harmful Bloons to attack other cities.

Bloons TD 6 is the currently newest installment of the Bloons TD series, and the aim of the game remains mostly similar to other games of the Bloons TD series, but with additional features that earlier games of the series lack.

Bloons TD Battles 2 is a multiplayer-oriented version of Bloons TD 6, as well as a sequel to Bloons TD Battles. It hosts all the new towers from the latest installment of the Bloons TD series, remaining with the same objective as its predecessor in the Battles series.

=== Bloons Super Monkey ===
Bloons Super Monkey is the first game in the Bloons Super Monkey series and centers around arcade gameplay. Also having a mobile port with the only difference being the ability to load and create saves.

==== Gameplay of Bloons Super Monkey ====
The player must move around a monkey in superhero clothing (hence, Super Monkey) with their mouse to pop oncoming Bloons in increasingly difficult levels. Winning a level earns the player the in-game currency "Power Blops" which enable the player to upgrade their Super Monkey's abilities.

After every round the player is graded Gold, Silver or Bronze, depending on how many Bloons have been popped. If the player fails to pop enough bloons for a Bronze grading, the level is not passed and must be repeated to advance.

In addition, the sequel, Bloons Super Monkey 2, contains a new system for upgrades where you can upgrade several parts of the monkey, such as his eyes or his individual arms. The sequel also interduces the Diamond grade, obtainable by popping every single bloon.

=== Ninja Kiwi Archive ===
The Ninja Kiwi Archive was released July 8, 2020, as a way for Ninja Kiwi to preserve their original Flash games after its end-of-life announcement by Adobe as a free Steam app. This allows 67 of their flash games, with the exception of Who Wants To Be A Bloonionaire? and Bloons TD 5 Deluxe to be played after Flash's end-of-life, however it still requires an internet connection for the games to be played. January 12, 2021, Ninja Kiwi officially removed its flash games from the playable section of the website, and simultaneously announced that because of the end-of-life deadline, the archive will remain indefinitely unplayable. However, the app was fixed again in February 2021 and in March of the same year was released as an independent launcher that does not require Steam.

SAS Zombie Assault 3

SAS Zombie Assault was another Ninja Kiwi game released on March 24, 2011, for the closed beta and fully released on June 6, 2011, for the open beta. The iOS version was released on December 20, 2011.

The game begins with members of the elite Special Air Service (SAS) being sent into a rural area after reports of zombie attacks. The mission is to investigate these incidents as well as get rid of any evidence, but while staging an operation in a farmhouse, the SAS become under attack by a horde. After shooting down the zombies and surviving the attack, the members of the SAS investigate and eliminate the source of the new strain of zombies.

SAS Zombie Assault 4

SAS Zombie Assault 4 was released back on May 11, 2014 (open beta) which was a top-down shooter game with game modes such as Single-player and Multi-player.

==== Red Reign ====
Red Reign is a real-time strategy video game released by Ninja Kiwi as a launch titles for Apple Arcade in September 2019. In the game, players try to conquer the enemy's castle by deploying units, in the vein of StarCraft and Warcraft's multiplayer modes.

== Awesome Points ==
Awesome Points were used to keep track of a player's achievements and medals they earn within Ninja Kiwi games. Depending on how much Awesome Points a player has, they may level up.

Leveling up entails a newly earned title with the highest being rewarded at Level 59 being called "Sky Spirit", and a spin of the wheel of fate, and a new avatar as a reward. Awesome Points can also go to a Clan's total awesome, pushing their clan up the rankings. Another reward that comes with leveling up is either differently colored profile stars to the value of one's votes on the forum being multiplied.
