= Grinding Gear Games =

New Zealand video game developer company

- Type: Subsidiary
- Industry: Video games
- Founded: 2006
- Founders: Chris Wilson; Jonathan Rogers; Erik Olofsson
- Headquarters: Auckland, New Zealand
- Key people: Jonathan Rogers (Technical Director); Erik Olofsson (Art Director); Brian Weissman (Executive Producer)
- Products: Path of Exile; Path of Exile 2
- Number of employees: 250 (2025)
- Parent: Tencent
- Website: www.grindinggear.com

Grinding Gear Games is a New Zealand video game developer, which is considered the most prominent in the country. Founded in 2006, the Auckland company has produced two games, Path of Exile, and its sequel, Path of Exile 2. Having started as an independent developer, the company was majority acquired by Chinese technology company Tencent in 2018, after Tencent had published Path of Exile in China in 2017. In 2025, Grinding Gear Games paid almost NZ$100 million in dividends to Tencent.

== History ==
Grinding Gear Games was founded in 2006 in Auckland, New Zealand, by friends Chris Wilson and Jonathan Rogers, who met while studying computer science at the University of Auckland. They started the business in Wilson's garage in New Lynn. They were joined by designer Erik Olofsson, a Swedish gamer that Wilson had met online; Olofsson flew to New Zealand to join Wilson and Rogers a few months later. They moved to office premises in Titirangi in 2008. By 2012, the studio had grown to 18 staff.

Grinding Gear Games developed the game Path of Exile. The open-beta build was released worldwide in January 2013 and the 1.0 version of the game was released on 23 October 2013. During the open beta, from 23 January 2013 to release, more than 46,000 people participated. The company crowd-funded Path of Exile through allowing users to pre-purchase in-game microtransactions ahead of the game's launch date. It raised over $245,000 in the first six days. The company then began focusing on releasing for more platforms, more regions, and on creating cosmetic items available for purchase through microtransactions. By 2017 it had moved premises to Henderson and had a staff of more than one hundred.

In 2013, co-founder Chris Wilson was a finalist for The New Zealand Herald's Business Leader of the Year.

It was published in China by Chinese technology company Tencent in 2017. In May 2018, Tencent became a majority holder in Grinding Gear Games, acquiring 86.67% of the company's shares, with three of the co-founders holding the remaining 13.3%. Two of the co-founders sit on the board of directors, alongside three directors appointed by Tencent in April 2018. By December 2023, Tencent owned 93%. In March 2024, the three co-founders sold their remaining shares to Tencent, which made the company the sole owner. Grinding Gear Games paid almost NZ$100 million in dividends to Tencent in 2025. It had 180 staff in New Zealand in April 2024, and 240 staff by July 2025. In 2025, Rogers funded a STEM-focused private school in collaboration with academic Tristan O'Hanlon, which has been given resource consent.

== Games developed ==
Year	Title	Platform(s)
2013	Path of Exile	Windows, PS4, Xbox One, Mac
2024	Path of Exile 2	Windows, PS5, Xbox Series X/S
