= Noitu Love and the Army of Grinning Darns =

- Developer: Joakim "Konjak" Sandberg
- Publisher: Joakim "Konjak" Sandberg
- Platform: Windows
- Release: April 2006
- Genre: Action platformer
- Mode: Single-player

Noitu Love and the Army of Grinning Darns is an indie 2D platformer video game developed by Joakim "Konjak" Sandberg. It was released in April 2006 for Windows. The game is set in a utopian science fiction world in the year 2188. Mad scientist Darnacus Damnation invades an unnamed city, in an attempt to reverse evolution and turn the world's population into monkeys using the banned technology of "Evomatics". The protagonist is Noitu Love, an agent of the Peacekeepers League who is assisted by his handler Lori as he attempts to stop Darnacus and his army of robotic "Grinning Darns". The player is able to use evolution chambers to reverse or accelerate Noitu's evolution, turning him into several different animal or humanoid forms. While freeware, the game received a commercial sequel, Noitu Love 2: Devolution, in 2008. Noitu Love was well-regarded by critics as uncommonly good for its time and engaging despite its short length and limited gameplay, though its soundtrack was criticized.

== Reception ==
PC Zone named Noitu Love its "Freeware Game of the Month" in September 2006, describing it as "Mega Man meets Streets of Rage". While calling its mechanics basic, the publication nevertheless said that the game remained interesting due to its fast pace. Retro Gamer rated the game highly, calling its title "bizarre", and its story "pure (but wonderful) lunacy". The publication stated that the game "hemorrhages a tremendous amount of variety", due to its levels, bosses, unlockables, and other features.

A retrospective review by Ed Burns of Hardcore Gaming 101 called Noitu Love and its sequel some of the best indie action games for "quite some time" before indie games increased drastically in popularity. While calling its style similar to the "NES platformers of old", he noted its focus on close-range combat as making it "incomparable to any other game of the era". He also praised the form change ability and the game's fast pacing for making it never become repetitive, but called the music poorly done and "off-tune". While saying it was "surpassed completely by its sequel", he nevertheless commended it overall as being "interesting throughout its short playtime".
