= Noitu Love 2: Devolution =

- Developer: Joakim "Konjak" Sandberg
- Publishers: Joakim "Konjak" Sandberg, Golgoth Studio
- Platforms: Windows, Wii U eShop, Nintendo 3DS
- Release: April 18, 2008 (Windows); September 15, 2016 (Wii U, 3DS)
- Genre: Action video game
- Mode: Single-player

Noitu Love 2: Devolution (shortened to Noitu Love: Devolution for the game's console versions) is a 2D action side-scrolling video game developed and published by indie developer Joakim "Konjak" Sandberg, published on April 18, 2008 for Windows, and published by Golgoth Studio on September 15, 2016 for Wii U eShop and Nintendo 3DS.

It is a sequel to the 2006 video game Noitu Love and the Army of Grinning Darns, whose story was set in a utopian science fiction world in the year 2188. In it, mad scientist Darnacus Damnation attempted to reverse evolution and turn the world's population into monkeys using the banned technology of "Evomatics", but was stopped by Noitu Love, an agent of the Peacekeepers League. In 2288, 100 years after that game's events, Darnacus' robot army, the Grinning Darns, attack the same unnamed city again, and send many parts of the city back in time. The Peacekeepers League call new member Xoda Rap to action to stop them. The game uses keyboard and mouse controls, which were extrapolated to the Wii U and 3DS as touchscreen controls.

The game was positively reviewed by critics, who praised its artwork and gameplay, but were more critical of its control scheme and high level of difficulty.

== Development ==
Noitu Love 2, as with Sandberg's other games, was developed as a hobby, with his main job being a 2D animator. It was the first commercial game that Sandberg had released, priced at USD $20. This was largely prompted by others saying he could sell his games, and while he intended on a lower price point, he was afraid he would make the game seem worse than it actually was. Sandberg said that he purposely designed the game not to be overly difficult because he was not a hardcore gamer himself.

Sandberg claimed that the game was not inspired by Gunstar Heroes or Mega Man, and that he was never inspired directly by any one game, but that his favorite 2D platformers, such as Metal Slug and Kirby: Squeak Squad, were "fun and flowing", and that he wanted to make such a game. He made the game have an emphasis on bosses due to his interest in "tactics and unique encounters" and included mechanics he enjoyed in games, such as a lack of guns and bosses having weak points.

== Reception ==
Chris Dahlen of The A.V. Club praised the bosses as "breakneck setpieces". Ed Burns of Hardcore Gaming 101 described the game as a large improvement on its predecessor, calling it "clearly where Sandberg’s heart and soul really went". Saying it was inspired by the games of Treasure, he called its gameplay "intense" and "non-stop action". Praising the bosses as the best part of the game, he also praised the extra content as adding replayability despite the game's short length. He criticized the music as "rather forgettable, and somewhat abrasive at its worst", but remarked that the game was "absolutely worth your purchase". Reviewing the game's Wii U version, Donald Theriault of Nintendo World Report called it a "fun arcade experience" that was unique on the platform, but noted "quality of life deficits". Matthew Mason of Nintendo Life said that the Wii U version was a "labor of love" that, while retro-styled in graphics, nevertheless sought to reinvent the wheel with its control scheme. He praised the Wii Remote as being better to control the game than the touchscreen of the Wii U GamePad. In his review of the 3DS version, he said that it was also worse than the Wii Remote to control the game, saying players might become uncomfortable, but nevertheless recommended the game.
