= Science fiction video game =

Video game theme

A science fiction game is a video game that falls under the science fiction genre. The genre has existed since the dawn of video games, with their evolution being shaped heavily by it. Spacewar! (1962), one of the first video games ever made, was science fiction-themed. While most video games blend together fantasy and sci-fi in a way that makes it difficult to strictly divide the two, also known as science fantasy or space opera, a much smaller subgroup of games feature a hard sci-fi setting with more emphasis on scientific accuracy.

Sci-fi games have historically drawn upon literary influences in their early days, such as Robert A. Heinlein, Larry Niven and E. E. Smith, due to a lack of other types of sci-fi media, such as movies, comics, and other games. However, modern games of the genre more often tend to be influenced by other contemporary media.

== Characteristics ==
Science fiction games traditionally have a male-dominated audience, with a 2017 survey by Quantic Foundry finding that only 16% of sci-fi MMO players were female, compared to 36% of high fantasy MMO players. Thus, they are not as popular as fantasy games overall, although there are exceptions. BioWare games notably have a large female audience, with the players of Star Wars: Knights of the Old Republic being 29% female.

Sci-fi games often feature themes of saving planets, galaxies, or the universe from destruction at the hands of other humans, artificial intelligence, or hostile extraterrestrial beings, culminating in exciting set pieces. They sometimes feature peaceful exploration of the unknown as a smaller part of the game, but rarely revolve around it, in contrast to sci-fi works of other mediums. Despite the creativity inherent in science fiction, many such games are formulaic and practical by necessity to conform to common gameplay mechanics, such as aliens being humanoid so they act in a manner shooter players are familiar with.

Realistic playable space combat or dogfighting in sci-fi games is relatively rare despite its prominence in other mediums of sci-fi. The space combat genre enjoyed widespread popularity on PC in the 1990s, but "dried up" afterwards, due to a shift towards console games and their less complex standard shooters. While stylized renditions are popular in genres like shoot 'em ups, fully 3D games usually revolve around on-foot gameplay taking place on the surface of planets or within spacecraft. Modern exceptions include No Man's Sky (2016), which lets players explore a procedurally generated universe, and Starfield (2023), whose space combat was specifically cited as being inspired by 90's sims.

== Prominent examples ==
Video game designer Hideo Kojima, who was influenced as a child by books by Isaac Asimov and Arthur C. Clarke, is notably a science fiction fan. Much of his output has influenced the depiction of sci-fi in video games. The Metal Gear and Death Stranding series, both featuring sci-fi elements, have become significant blockbusters, alongside lesser-known works such as the Zone of the Enders series of mecha games, Snatcher and Policenauts.

Other major franchises in the sci-fi realm include Wing Commander, StarCraft, XCOM, Deus Ex, and Halo. In particular, Halo is one of the best-known sci-fi video game franchises in the world, and draws influences from the Ringworld series and military sci-fi.

== Real-world influence ==
Sci-fi games often influence real-world engineers and investors in a similar manner as other sci-fi media, by demonstrating ideas for futuristic technology. A notable example was Deus Ex: Human Revolution (2011), which heavily featured themes of human augmentation, inspiring the creation of a documentary and investments in prosthetics. Some sci-fi games also address the potential dangers of existing technology, such as Watch Dogs (2014) which follows a hacker in a future smart city version of Chicago.

== See also ==
- Space flight simulation game
