= 1990s in video games =

Video game-related events in 1990s

- 1980s
- 1990s in video games
- 2000s
Other topics in 1990s:
- Anthropology
- Comics
- Fashion
- Motorsport
- Music
- Science and technology
- Sociology
- Television

The 1990s was the third decade in the industry's history. It was a decade of marked innovation in video gaming. It was a decade of transition from sprite-based graphics to full-fledged 3D graphics and it gave rise to several genres of video games including, but not limited to, the first-person shooter, real-time strategy, survival horror, and MMO. Arcade games, although still very popular in the early 1990s, began to decline as home consoles became more common. The fourth, fifth and sixth generation of video game consoles went on sale, including the Sega Genesis, Super Nintendo, Sega Saturn, PlayStation, Nintendo 64, Game Boy Color and the Sega Dreamcast. Notable games released in the 1990s included Super Mario World, Sonic the Hedgehog, Street Fighter II, Mortal Kombat, Doom, Wolfenstein 3D, Quake, Final Fantasy VII, Half-Life, Super Mario 64, Pokémon Red, Blue, and Yellow, GoldenEye 007, The Legend of Zelda: Ocarina of Time, Star Fox 64, Super Metroid, Castlevania: Symphony of the Night, Metal Gear Solid, Resident Evil, StarCraft, Tomb Raider, Gran Turismo, Super Mario Kart, Crash Bandicoot, Spyro the Dragon, Tony Hawk's Pro Skater, Chrono Trigger, Age of Empires, Civilization, Myst, and Soulcalibur.

== Consoles of the 1990s ==
=== Fourth generation consoles (1987–2003) ===
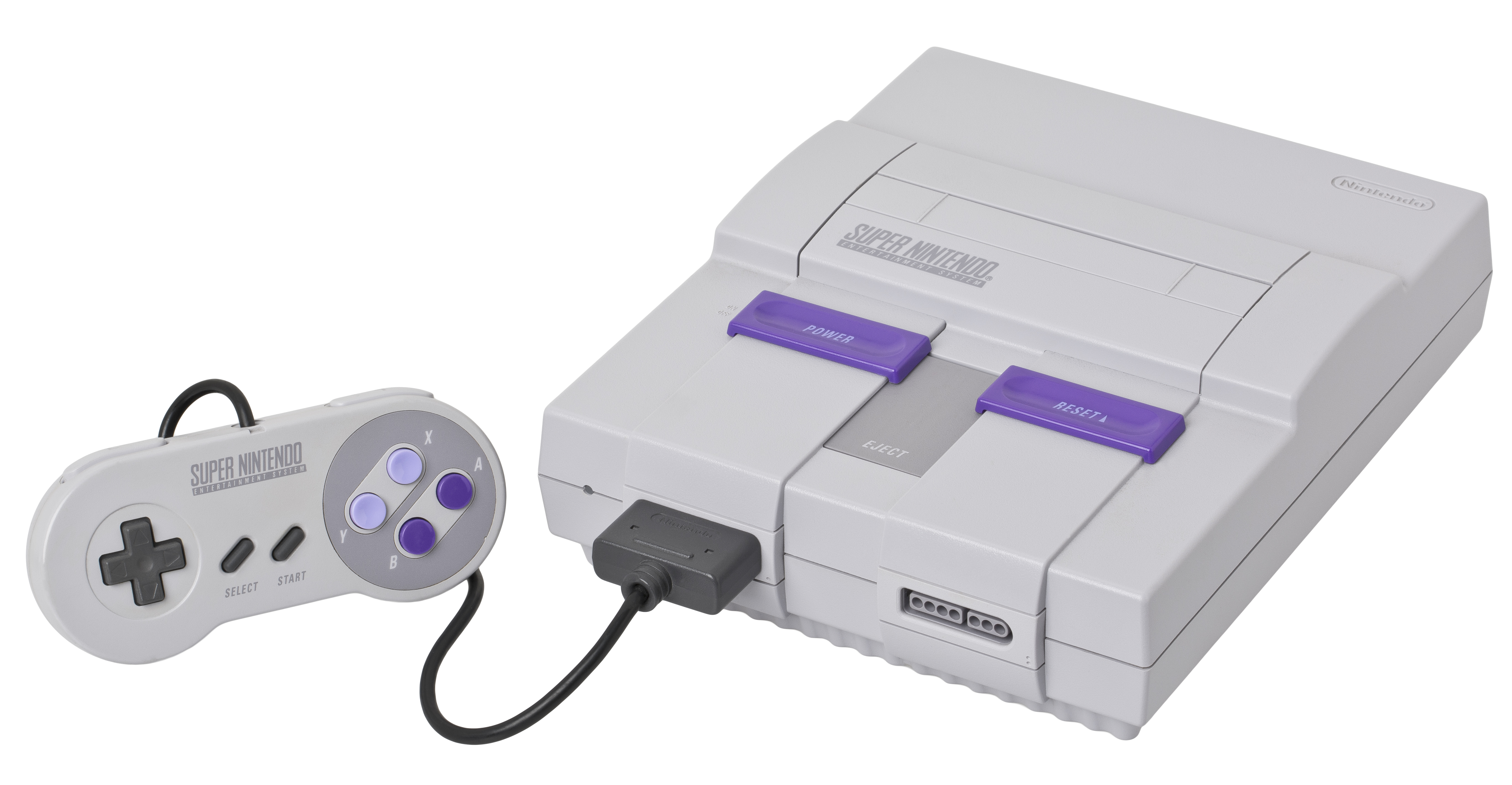
SNES (1990)

Starting in 1987 and ending in 1998, the fourth generation of video game consoles consisted primarily of games and systems programmed for the 16-bit era. During this generation, 2D graphics had improved over the previous generation and experimentation began to occur with 3D graphics, although 3D games were more prevalent on the PC at the time. The fourth generation also was the first time compact discs were considered a viable port for video game retail sales with the CD-i. Some of the most notable systems released during this generation were the Mega Drive/Genesis (1988), the Super NES (1990) and the Neo Geo (1991). Nintendo's Game Boy was also released during the fourth generation, which would later become the most popular series of handheld gaming systems during the 1990s. A rivalry between Sega and Nintendo occurred during this generation, starting the 2nd major console war, The 1st being between Atari 2600 & Intellivision.

=== Fifth generation consoles (1993–2006) ===
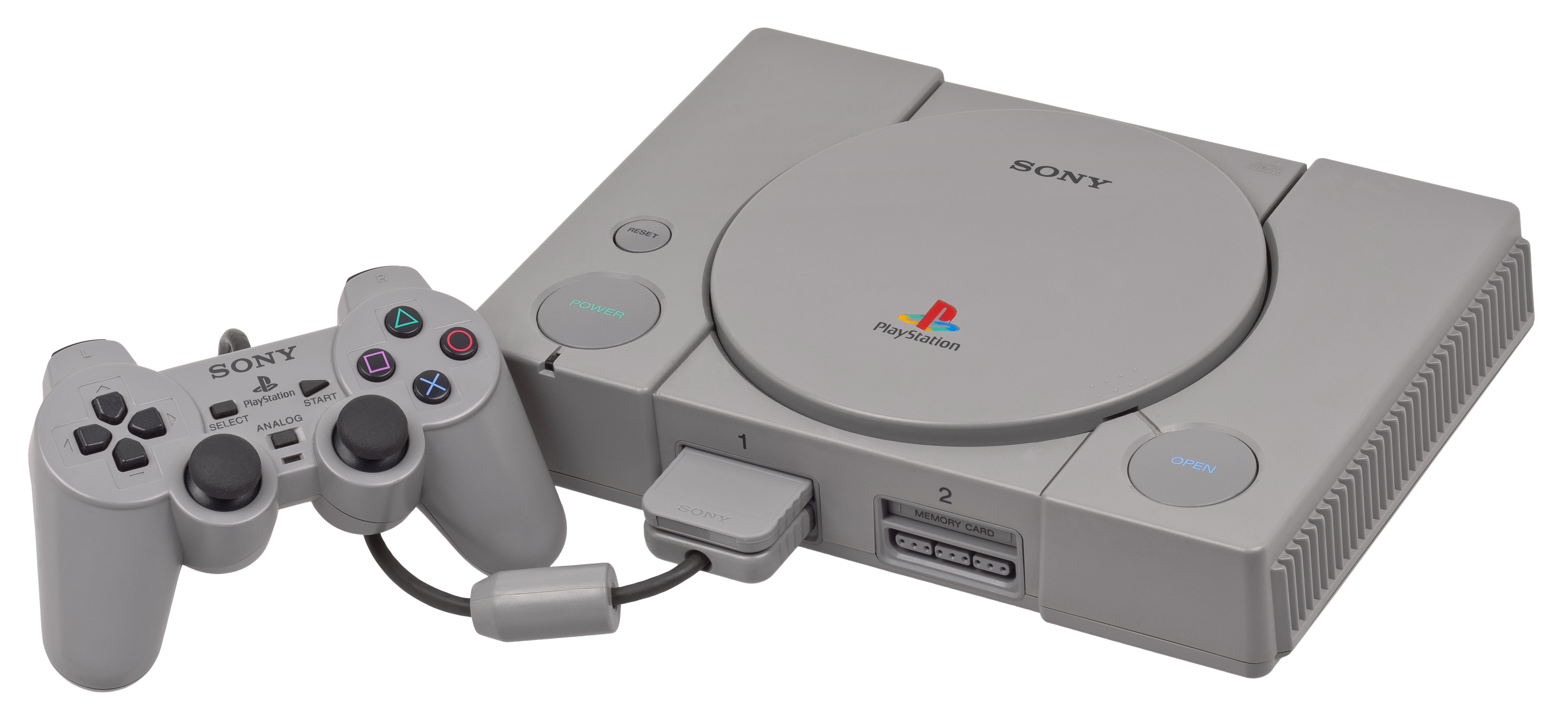
PlayStation (1994)

Starting in 1993 and ending in 2001, the fifth generation of video games are most widely known to be the 32/64 bit era and for being the transition period for video games to evolve into the third dimension. The Nintendo 64 (1996), PlayStation 1 (1994), Sega Saturn (1994), and Atari Jaguar (1993) are considered to be the big four gaming systems of this generation. With the introduction of the PlayStation and Saturn, compact discs (CDs) began to replace cartridges however Nintendo continued using them with the Nintendo 64 due to the load times on CDs at the time and became one of the last cartridge based systems in mass production.

=== Sixth generation console (1998–2013) ===
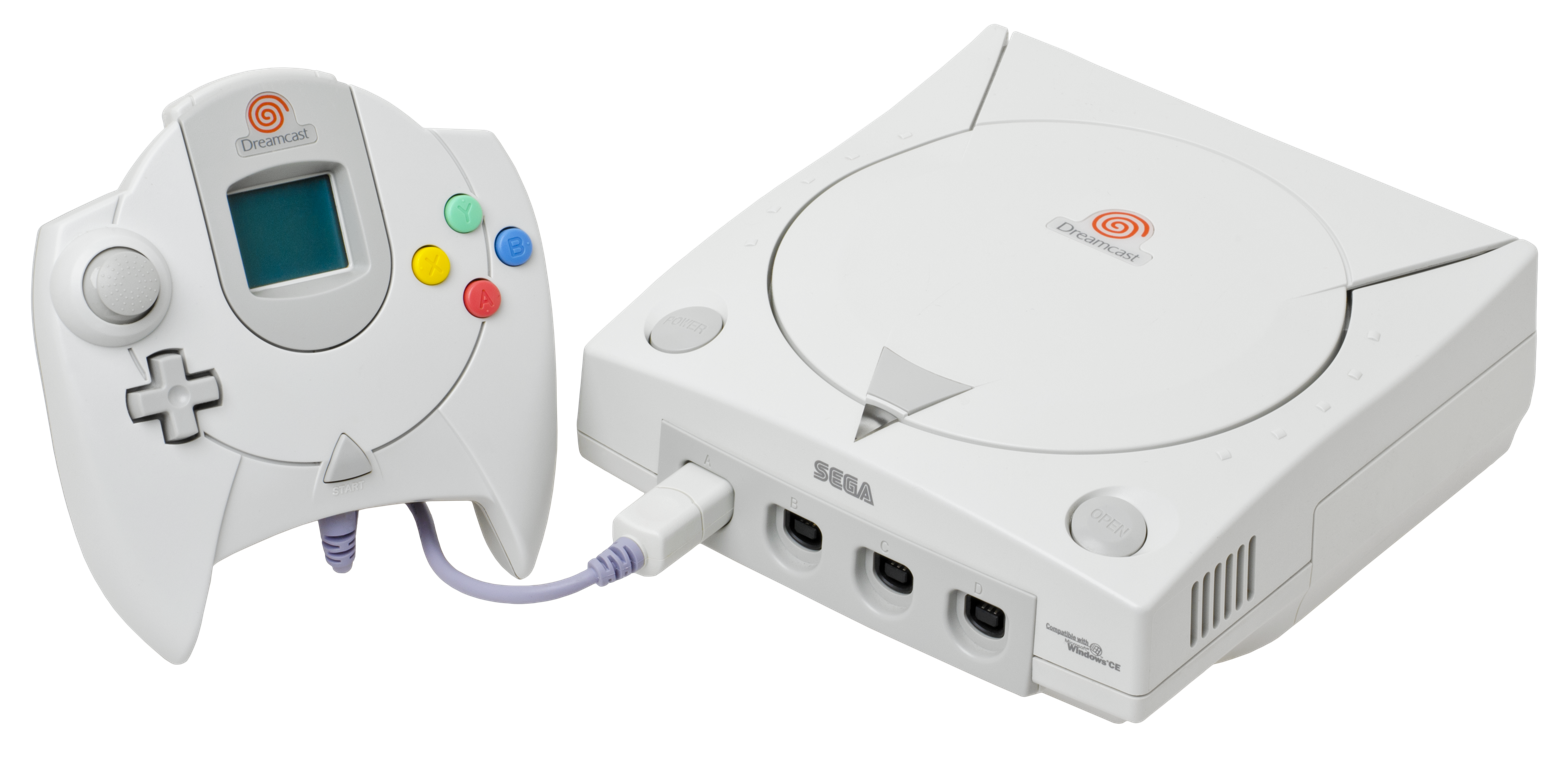
Dreamcast (1998)

The sixth generation was initiated by the release of the Dreamcast in 1998. It introduced several innovations including Internet gaming as a standard feature through its built-in modem, and a web browser. It was also the first home console to always display full SD resolution. Despite its early success, the Dreamcast was discontinued prematurely as sales slowed following the release of the PlayStation 2 on March 4, 2000.

== Technological innovation ==
=== Introduction of 3D polygons and environments ===
There was a "3D Revolution" in the 1990s, where video games made the transition from 2D and pseudo-3D graphics to real-time 3D polygon graphics, a trend popularized by 3D arcade video games in the early 1990s. This transition was largely driven by a technological arms race between two of the largest arcade game manufacturers, Sega and Namco, during the early-to-mid-1990s. The Namco System 21 which was originally developed for racing games in the late 1980s was adapted by Namco for new 3D action games in the early 1990s, such as the rail shooters Galaxian 3 (1990) and Solvalou (1991). Sega responded with the Sega Model 1, which further popularized 3D polygons with Sega AM2 games including Virtua Racing (1992) and the fighting game Virtua Fighter (1993), especially popularizing 3D polygon human characters. Namco then responded with the Namco System 22, capable of 3D polygon texture mapping and Gouraud shading, used for Ridge Racer (1993). The Sega Model 2 took it further with 3D polygon texture filtering, used by 1994 for racers such as Daytona USA, fighting games such as Virtua Fighter 2, and light gun shooters such as Virtua Cop. Namco responded with 3D fighters such as Tekken (1994) and 3D light gun shooters such as Time Crisis (1995), the latter running on the Super System 22. Other arcade manufacturers were also manufacturing 3D arcade hardware by this time, including Midway Games, Konami and Taito.

On home consoles, the success of Sega's Virtua Fighter in the arcades inspired Sony to develop the PlayStation (released 1994) as a 3D-focused hardware, rather than a 2D-focused hardware as they had originally planned. Super Mario 64 (1996) is said to be one of the most revolutionary video games. It was praised for how it took to 3D environments of wide open spaces and graphics at the time. Many games that moved onto 3D also tried to mimic Mario's success. Instead of pixels, polygons became a standard sight to be in video games from then on as they looked more lifelike when programmed into the right shapes. Lara Croft of the Tomb Raider series became the first video game sex symbol, becoming a recognizable figure in the entertainment industry throughout the late 1990s.

On personal computers, id Software's Doom (1993) is widely credited as the origin of modern first-person shooter (FPS) video games. Some people give this credit to id's Wolfenstein 3D (1992), as it was released roughly a year and a half earlier than Doom, but was not nearly as popular. Wolfenstein 3D was one of the first video games to feature ray casting with texture mapping, where graphical textures are wrapped around 3D objects. They were succeeded by id's Quake (1996), which made the transition from ray casting to 3D polygon graphics.

=== Optical disc storage ===
Nearly every system released in the mid-late 1990s began to move to the new CD-ROM technology, with the Nintendo 64 being the last major home video game console to use ROM cartridges. Also appealing to publishers was that CDs could be produced at significantly less expense and with more flexibility (it was easy to change production to meet demand), and they were able to pass the lower costs onto consumers. In particular, the fifth generation marked a turning point for optical-based storage media. As games grew more complex in content, sound, and graphics, the CD proved more than capable of providing enough space for the extra data. The cartridge format, however, was pushed beyond the limits of its storage capacity. Consequently, many game developers shifted their support away from the Nintendo 64 to the PlayStation.

=== Memory cards ===
Due to CD-ROMs lacking the built-in memory of ROM Cartridges, the Sony PlayStation introduced the use of memory cards to store saved game data. This became the standard for video game consoles until it was replaced by the use of hard drives and built-in flash memory during the seventh generation in the late first decade of the 21st century.

=== Game controllers ===
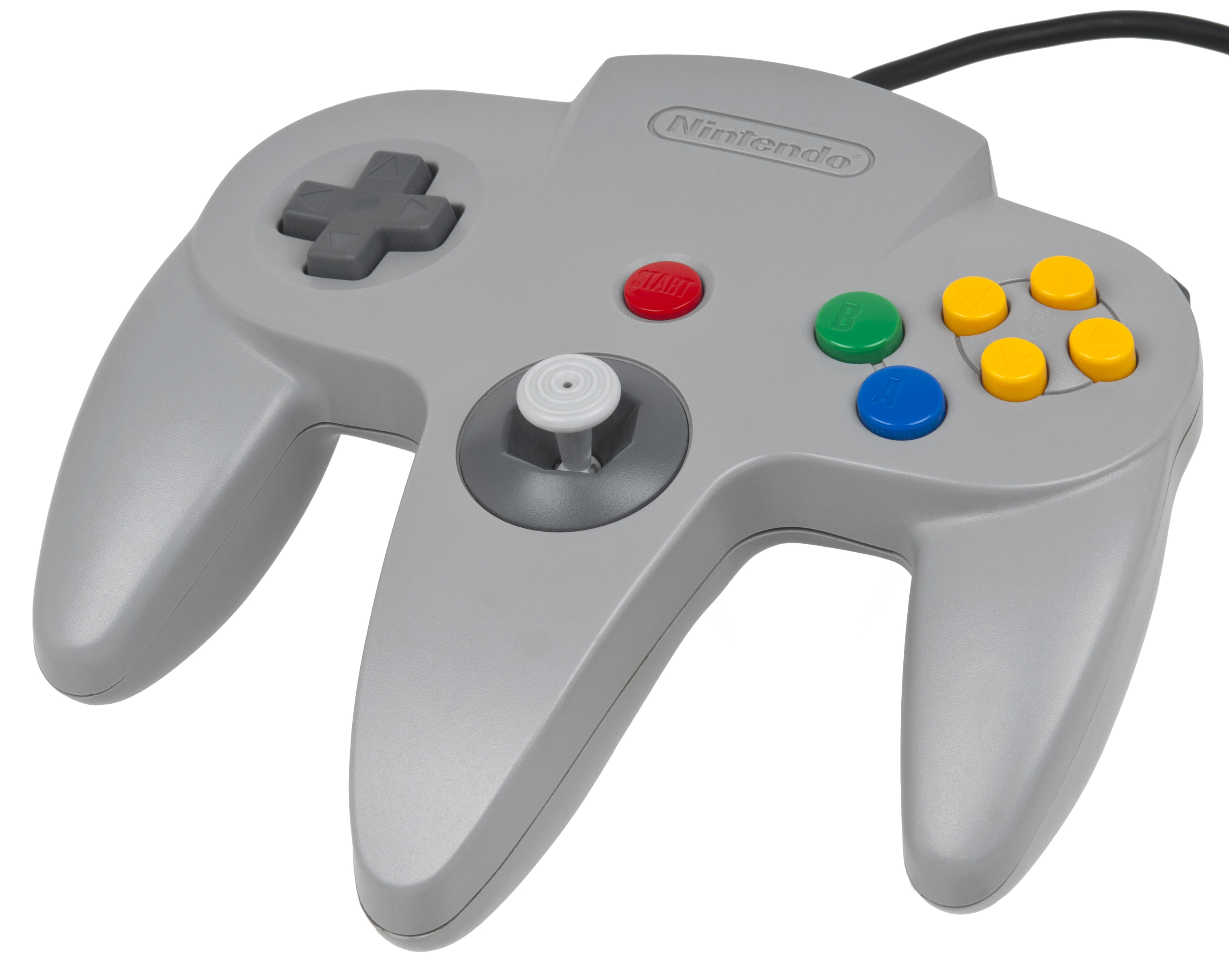
Nintendo 64 controller (1996)

Ergonomics

The Super NES controller introduced a more rounded dog-bone like design and added two more face buttons, "X" and "Y", arranging the four in a diamond formation. Another addition was the "L" and "R" shoulder buttons, which have been imitated by most controllers since.

The PlayStation controller was the first standard operating device for a home console to use two handle-bars at the bottom of the controller whereas previously this feature had been relegated to niche specialist controllers. This has been standard in most game controllers since, until the Wii appeared.

The Virtual Boy Controller was a controller which utilized dual joypads similar to how analog sticks functioned in later "dual control" sixth-generation systems. The presence of two pads was an effort to control objects in a 3D environment (one pad controlling pitch and turning while the other controlling forward movement and strafing).

Analog stick

An analog stick sometimes called a control stick or thumbstick, is an input device for a game controller that is used for two-dimensional input. An analog stick is a variation of a joystick, consisting of a protrusion from the controller; input is based on the position of this protrusion in relation to the default "center" position. While D-pads and digital sticks rely on single electrical connections for movement (using internal digital electrical contacts for up, down, left and right), analog sticks use continuous electrical activity running through potentiometers to measure the exact position of the stick within its full range of motion. In 1996 Nintendo introduced the first analog thumbstick on the Nintendo 64 controller. It was subsequently followed during the fifth generation by the 3D Control Pad (packaged with Nights into Dreams...), the Sony Dual Analog gamepad which introduced the use of two analog sticks, and the Sony DualShock. Since then, all major video game console controllers have included two analog thumbsticks, except for the Wii's "Wii-mote".

Force feedback

The optional Rumble Pak for the Nintendo 64 controller introduced the use of haptic force feedback technology in gaming. It was later followed by the DualShock controller for the PlayStation which had built-in haptic feedback. Since then, built-in force feedback has become standard for most game controllers.

Pressure-sensitive button

The use of pressure-sensitive buttons was introduced by the Dreamcast in 1999. It has trigger-like shoulder buttons, similar to the earlier Nintendo 64 controller, but the main difference being that DreamCast controller's shoulder buttons are pressure-sensitive. Since then, most game controllers have included pressure-sensitive buttons.

=== Online gaming ===
The rapid availability of the Internet in the 1990s led to an expansion of Online games, Video game consoles also began to receive online networking peripherals, such as the Satellaview (1995), SegaNet (1996). Online gaming, which had been the exclusive domain of PC games, became prominent in video game consoles starting with Dreamcast online functionality in 1999 with its built in modem, internet browsing software, and ability to play certain games online. Nearly all consoles since released then have had support for online gaming.

== Genre innovation ==
Many technically innovative and genre-defining games were developed during the 1990s, largely due to the impact of 3D graphics allowing three-dimensional environments as well as optical discs which allowed much greater storage capacity.

=== Fighting games ===
The release of Street Fighter II in 1991 is often considered a revolutionary moment in the fighting game genre. Yoshiki Okamoto's team developed the most accurate joystick and button scanning routine in the genre thus far. This allowed players to reliably execute multi-button special moves, which had previously required an element of luck. The game was also highly successful because its graphics took advantage of Capcom's CPS arcade chipset, with highly detailed characters and stages. Whereas previous games allowed players to combat a variety of computer-controlled fighters, Street Fighter II allowed players to play against each other. The popularity of Street Fighter II surprised the gaming industry, as arcade owners bought more machines to keep up with demand.

SNK released Fatal Fury: King of Fighters a few months later, adding a two-plane system where characters could step into the foreground or background. Meanwhile, Sega experimented with Dark Edge, an early attempt at a 3D fighting game where characters could move in all directions. Sega however, never released the game outside Japan because it felt that unrestrained 3D fighting games were unenjoyable. Several fighting games achieved greater commercial success, including SNK's Art of Fighting and Samurai Shodown as well as Sega's Eternal Champions. Nevertheless, Street Fighter II remained the most popular, spawning a special Champion Edition that improved game balance and allowed players to use additional characters. The popularity of Street Fighter II led it to be released for home game consoles and allowed it to define the template for fighting games.

Sega began to attract attention with the 1993 release of Virtua Fighter in arcades. It was the first fighting game with 3D polygon graphics and a viewpoint that zoomed and rotated with the action. Despite the graphics, players were confined to back and forth motion as seen in other fighting games. By the time the game was released for the Sega Saturn in Japan, the game and system were selling at almost a one-to-one ratio. In 1994, SNK released The King of Fighters '94 in arcades, where players choose from teams of three characters to eliminate each other one by one. A follow-up to Street Fighter II, Street Fighter Alpha, was released in 1995 but was unable to match the popularity of its predecessor. Throughout this period, the fighting game was the dominant genre in competitive video gaming, with enthusiasts popularly attending arcades in order to find human opponents.

The fighting game genre continued to evolve as several strong 3D fighting games emerged in the late 1990s. Namco's Tekken (released in arcades in 1994 and on the PlayStation in 1995) proved critical to the PlayStation's early success, with its sequels also becoming some of the console's most important titles. In 1992, Mortal Kombat became a popular fighting game due to its sprites being real people digitalized into the game with graphic and controversial depictions of violence, most notably, the fatalities. The Soul series of weapon-based fighting games also achieved considerable critical success, beginning with 1996's Soul Edge. Tecmo's Dead or Alive (released in 1996 in arcades, 1997 on the Sega Saturn and 1998 on the PlayStation) spawned a long-running franchise, known for its fast-paced control system, innovative counterattacks, and interactive environments. The series again included titles important to the success of their respective consoles.

=== First-person shooters ===
The first-person shooter (FPS) typically features the player as the protagonist. Most often the player does not see the face of who they are playing, but will always see the weapon of choice located in the players hand in the lower left or right hand corner. FPSs are usually violent and feature blood and gore, which has sparked controversy from parent groups.

With the introduction of the fifth generation of games, 3-D graphics become the standard by end of decade. Although FPSs had been some of the first games to become 3-D.

In 1992 Wolfenstein 3d is released, creating interest in what FPS games could become. Doom (1993) bursts onto the world scene and instantly popularizes the FPS genre, and even how games are played, as Doom is among the first games to feature multiplayer capabilities. It was Goldeneye 007 (1997), that introduced an engine that made development of first-person shooters for home consoles a practical idea. It is not until Quake (1996), however, that game developers begin to take multiplayer features into serious consideration when making games. Quake II (1997), Unreal (1998) and Half-Life (1998) feature the next evolutionary step in the genre with continual progression of the game (no levels in the traditional sense) and an entirely in-person view, and become one of the most popular video games in history.

=== Interactive movies ===
In the early-to-mid-1990s, several video game developers experimented with plot twists and providing alternative storylines and endings into their games. They even went as far as to film live action scenes and scripted popular actors to play the parts. Night Trap, released in 1992, was highly acclaimed for implementing live action scenes into video games and later the Wing Commander series dove into live action as well. Wing Commander IV: The Price of Freedom was given an unheard of budget of US$12 million and starred Mark Hamill of Star Wars fame. The Wing Commander series was known for providing several alternate endings depending on how the player followed the story and interacted with the characters.

=== Platform games ===
The platform game genre evolved through several distinct phases throughout the 1990s. The first was an evolutionary step during the fifth generation in the early 1990s, followed by a complete transformation of the genre during the sixth generation in the late 1990s.

Second-generation side-scrollers

The advent of 16-bit home consoles in the early 1990s marked an evolutionary step for the genre. By the time the Mega Drive and Super Nintendo Entertainment System launched, platform games were the most popular genre in home console gaming and were seen as vital for winning the console war. There was a particular emphasis on having a flagship platform title exclusive to a format, featuring a "mascot" character. Sega's Alex Kidd in the Enchanted Castle (1989) was only modestly successful, and Sega realized would need a stronger mascot to move Genesis units. In 1990, Hudson Soft released Bonk's Adventure featuring a character that would be positioned as NEC's mascot.

1990 marked the release of the Super NES, along with the much awaited Super Mario World. In order to fend off the new competition, Sega released Sonic the Hedgehog. Whereas Nintendo's offering featured a conservative design, true to the Mario tradition, Sonic showcased a new style of design made possible by a new generation of hardware. Sonic featured large fields that scrolled effortlessly in all directions, as well as all manner of uneven terrain, curved hills, and a complex physics system that allowed players to rush through its levels with well-placed jumps and rolls. It proved to be a massive hit, was a successful pack-in with new systems, and cemented the view that platform games would make or break a console.

The Sonic character was also seen as a new model for mascots in the early 1990s, particularly for his perceived "attitude", which characterized him as a rebel from the status quo. This "attitude" would soon become the status quo, as companies attempted to duplicate Sonic's success with their own brightly colored anthropomorphisms. Very frequently these were characterized by impatience, sarcasm, and frequent quipping to give them personality. These mascots, which included the likes of Gex, Bug!, and Bubsy, have mostly faded from relevance.

3D platformers

In 1996, Nintendo released Super Mario 64. Until this time there had been no established archetype for bringing platform games into 3D. Mario 64 set a new standard and would be imitated by many 3D platformers to follow. Its gameplay allowed players to explore open 3D environments with greater freedom than any previous attempt at a 3D platform game. To aid this, Nintendo incorporated an analog control stick to their standard Nintendo 64 controller, something which had not been included in a standard console controller since the Vectrex (and since incorporated into the DualShock among other controllers). This allowed for the finer precision needed for a free perspective. Players no longer followed a linear path to the ends of levels, either, with most levels providing objective-based goals. There were, however, a handful of "boss" levels that offered more traditional platforming, and showed what a more direct conversion to 3D might have been like.

Some argue that many modern 3D platformers, especially those influenced heavily by Super Mario 64, are not platformers at all, or at least are not really an extension of 2D platformers. Super Mario 64 brought a change in the goals of some platformers. In most 2D platformers, the player only had to reach a single goal to complete a level, but in many 3D platformers, each level had to be combed for collectible items such as puzzle pieces (Banjo-Kazooie) or stars (Super Mario 64). This allowed for more efficient use of large 3D areas and rewarded the player for thorough exploration, but they also often involved more elements of action-adventure games, and less jumping on platforms.

=== Racing games ===
In 1992, Sega produced Virtua Racing, one of the first games with full 3D graphics. It was able to combine the best features of games at the time, along with multiplayer machine linking and clean 3D graphics to produce a game that was above and beyond the arcade market standard of its time. Also, Nintendo broke new ground by introducing the Mario Kart series on the SNES with Super Mario Kart. Using the familiar characters from the Mario franchise, the game not only departed from the realism paradigm by using small karts for the players to drive, but also featured bright, colorful environments and allowed the players to pick up power-ups to improve performance or hamper other racers. This franchise also spawned multiple sequels such as Mario Kart 64 which would release on the N64 making the first Mario Kart game to feature 3D computer graphics while still using pre-rendered sprites for the characters and items.

In 1993, Namco struck back with Ridge Racer, and thus began the polygonal war of driving games. Sega struck back in 1994 with Daytona USA, while Midway introduced Cruis'n USA. Atari did not join the 3D craze until 1997, when it introduced San Francisco Rush. In 1996, Konami introduced GTI Club which allowed free roaming of the environment – something of a revolution that had only been done in 3D before in Hard Drivin'.

In 1997, Gran Turismo was released for the PlayStation. It was considered the most realistic racing simulation game in its time, combined with playability, enabling players of all skill levels to play. The Gran Turismo series has since become one of the most popular racing franchises ever, with the series selling more than 50 million copies worldwide. Colin McRae Rally was introduced in 1998 to the PC world, and was a successful semi-simulation of the world of rally driving (previously only available in Sega's less serious Sega Rally Championship). Motorhead, a PC game, was later adapted back to arcade.

1999 marked a change of games into more "free form" worlds. Midtown Madness allows the player to explore a simplified version of the city of Chicago using a variety of vehicles and any path that they desire. In the arcade world, Sega introduced Crazy Taxi, where players assume the role of a taxi driver that needs to get clients to their destination in the shortest amount of time. A similar game also from Sega is Emergency Call Ambulance, with almost the same gameplay (pick up patient, drop off at hospital, as fast as possible).

=== Role-playing games ===
The 1990s saw the emergence of several distinct subgenres of the role-playing video game genre.

Action role-playing games

1990 would see the release of Crystalis for the Nintendo Entertainment System and also Golden Axe Warrior for the Master System. Both games featured Zelda-like gameplay blended with genuine RPG elements, such as experience points, statistics-based equipment, and a magic-casting system. In 1991, Square released Seiken Densetsu for the Game Boy, also known as Final Fantasy Adventure in the West. Like Crystalis, the action in Seiken Densetsu bore a strong resemblance to that of Zelda, but added more RPG elements. Seiken Densetsu 2, also known as Secret of Mana, implemented an innovative multiplayer function, and further developed its combat with more diverse weaponry and spell-casting.

Unique among video games are Capcom's Dungeons & Dragons: Tower of Doom (1993) and Dungeons & Dragons: Shadow over Mystara (1996). These games were released for the arcades, and featured a blending of beat 'em up and RPG characteristics. The games were later released for the Sega Saturn together as the Dungeons & Dragons Collection (1999). Several later beat 'em ups followed this same formula, including Guardian Heroes, Castle Crashers and Dungeon & Fighter.

In Japan on Super Famicom, Tales of Phantasia was released in Japan in 1995, featuring real-time side-scrolling combat mode and an exploration mode similar to classic console RPGs. In 1996, Star Ocean was released that also has real-time combat and classic exploration but features bird's eye view. Namco and Enix did not publish these two revolutionary titles in America, even though sequels in the two series would become wildly popular on future generations of consoles in the US. Fifth generation era saw several popular action RPGs, such as Tales of Eternia, Brave Fencer Musashi and Legend of Oasis. In 1996 Nintendo released Super Mario RPG, for the SNES . Super Mario RPG was the first role playing game in the series and it launched to critical acclaim. It spawned two spiritual successors, Paper Mario and Mario & Luigi

On personal computers, the long-standing Ultima series of action RPGs continued to see releases, while the 3D action RPG franchise The Elder Scrolls, which would provide several major entries to the genre in the 2000s, saw its first releases.

The rogue-like genre lost much of its relevance, with only Diablo, which implemented the idea in a simplified and more forgiving way, achieving mainstream success.

Japanese video game company From Software released several entries to the King's Field series, which received mixed reviews and little attention both in the 90's and later, but whose elements would later be recycled in the genre-defining Dark Souls games.

Role-playing video games

It was in the early 1990s that the console role-playing video game genre distinguished itself greatly from computer RPGs, with the Final Fantasy series playing an instrumental role. Final Fantasy III introduced the "job system", a character progression engine allowing the player to change a character's class, as well as acquire new and advanced classes. Final Fantasy IV (1991) was one of the first role-playing games to feature a complex, involving plot, placing a much greater emphasis on character development and pioneering "the whole concept of dramatic storytelling in an RPG." It also introduced a new battle system: the "Active Time Battle" system, developed by Hiroyuki Ito, where the time-keeping system does not stop. Square Co., Ltd. filed a United States patent application for the ATB system on March 16, 1992, under the title "Video game apparatus, method and device for controlling same" and was awarded the patent on February 21, 1995. On the battle screen, each character has an ATB meter that gradually fills, and the player is allowed to issue a command to that character once the meter is full. The fact that enemies can attack or be attacked at any time is credited with injecting urgency and excitement into the combat system. Both the "job system" and the ATB system were fully developed in Final Fantasy V (1992) and continued to be used in later Final Fantasy games as well as other Square games such as Chrono Trigger (1995). Final Fantasy VI (1994) and the Megami Tensei series were some of the first RPGs to move away from the typical medieval setting, with Final Fantasy VI instead being set in a steampunk environment and the Megami Tensei games set in modern-day Japan.

The next major revolution came in the late 1990s, which saw the rise of optical disks in fifth generation consoles. The implications for RPGs were enormous—longer, more involved quests, better audio, and full-motion video. This was first clearly demonstrated by Final Fantasy VII (1997). The explosion of Final Fantasy VII's sales and the ascendance of the PlayStation were proof of this and represented the dawning of a new era of RPGs. Backed by a clever marketing campaign, Final Fantasy VII brought the first taste of CRPGs to many of the new gamers brought in by the PlayStation gaming console. Subsequently, CRPGs, previously a niche genre, skyrocketed in popularity.

In 1997, a new Internet fad began, influenced by the popularization of console RPGs. A large group of young programmers and aficionados began creating and sharing independent CRPG games, emulating the gameplay and style of the older Super NES and Genesis games. The majority of such games owe their achievement to simplistic software development kits such as the Japanese RPG Maker series.

In the final years of the 90's, US companies Interplay (through developer Black Isle Studios) and Bioware published several roleplaying games with similar gameplay, which are considered milestone classics of the genre. Planescape: Torment and Baldur's Gate were games with a Dungeons & Dragons license, while Interplay's Fallout was an unofficial successor to Wasteland from the 80's, and would be rebooted 10 years later to new critical acclaim.

MUDs and MMORPGs

1989 and the early 1990s saw the release and spread of the MUD codebases DikuMUD and LPMud, leading to a tremendous increase in the proliferation and popularity of MUDs. Before the end of the decade, the evolution of the genre continued through "graphical MUDs" into the first massively multiplayer online role-playing games (MMORPGs), a term coined by Richard Garriott in 1997. That genre, as currently defined, began with Meridian 59 in 1995, but first truly came into its own with Ultima Online in 1997, a game that provided a core idea of what later MMORPGs would become, featuring a massive continent on which players could interact with others from around the world, fight mythical creatures, and cast spells. After earlier games broke ground, widespread popularity for MMORPGs arrived with the debut of EverQuest and Asheron's Call in 1999. MMORPGs would become a common form of social interaction in the 2000s.

Tactical role-playing games

In 1990, Nintendo released and published the first tactical RPG, Fire Emblem: Ankoku Ryū to Hikari no Tsurugi for the Family Computer (or Famicom) in Japan, co-developed with Intelligent Systems. Released in Japan in 1990, Fire Emblem was an archetype for the whole genre, establishing gameplay elements that are still used in tactical CRPGs today (although some of these elements were influenced by Ultima III). Combining the basic console RPG concepts from games like Dragon Quest and simple turn-based strategy elements, Nintendo created a hit, which spawned many sequels and imitators.

Among the first imitators was Langrisser by NCS/Masaya, first released for the Mega Drive in 1991. It was localized for North American release under the title Warsong, with a few graphical alterations. The Langrisser series differed from Fire Emblem in that it used a general-soldier structure instead of controlling main characters. Master of Monsters was a unique title by SystemSoft. Where Langrisser and Fire Emblem used a square-based grid, Master of Monsters used a hexagonal grid. Players could choose one of four different Lords to defend their Towers and areas on the grid by building an army of creatures to destroy the opposing armies.

The first game in the long-running Super Robot Wars series is another early example of the genre, released for the Game Boy in 1991. Another influential early tactical RPG was Sega's Shining Force for the Genesis, which was released in 1992. Shining Force used even more console RPG elements than earlier games, allowing the player to walk around towns and talk to people and buy weapons. One game released solely in Japan for the Super Famicom (SFC), Bahamut Lagoon, began Square's (now Square Enix) famous line of tactical RPGs.

Ogre Battle: The March of the Black Queen was released for the Super NES and is more of a real-time strategy game in which the player forms role-playing video game-like character parties that are moved around a map in real-time. When two parties meet, the combat plays out with minimal user interaction. A later release, Tactics Ogre: Let Us Cling Together, was originally a SNES game that was later ported to the PlayStation. Tactics Ogre is a much more direct influence on the sort of tactical RPGs that gamers recognize today such as Final Fantasy Tactics and Disgaea: Hour of Darkness. It was also the first to bear the name "Tactics" in the title, a term gamers would come to associate with the genre. Not only are characters moved individually on a grid, but the view is isometric, and the order of combat is calculated for each character individually. The game defined the genre in many ways.

=== Stealth games ===
While stealth elements have been present in video games as far back as 005, a 1981 video game by Sega, it was in the 1990s that the stealth game genre was established. Hideo Kojima's Metal Gear 2: Solid Snake was released in 1990 for the MSX2 and was a major improvement over its predecessor, Metal Gear (1987). Metal Gear 2: Solid Snake improved on the first game in many ways, including improved graphics, more player abilities (such as crouching, crawling into hiding spots, disguising in enemy uniforms and cardboard boxes, and distracting guards by knocking on surfaces), improved enemy AI (such as a greater field of vision, the ability to detect various noises, and a three-level security alert), and additions such as a radar, as well as a complex storyline. The game was only released for the MSX2 in Japan, however, which limited its accessibility to consumers in the US. An alternative Metal Gear sequel named Snake's Revenge was released for the Nintendo Entertainment System in North America and Europe instead, also in 1990. Kojima was not involved in the game's development, which was instead conducted by another Konami team.

1998 is seen as a turning point in gaming history because of the release of Metal Gear Solid, as well as Tenchu: Stealth Assassins and Thief: The Dark Project. The ninja-themed game Tenchu: Stealth Assassins was released several months before Metal Gear Solid, making it the first 3D stealth based-game. The highly anticipated Metal Gear Solid transformed its modestly successful franchise into a large mainstream success. The increased power of the PlayStation console over previous platforms allowed for greater immersion in terms of both story and game environment. Metal Gear Solid has been credited with popularizing the stealth genre. The core elements of these games, such as avoiding confrontation, minimizing noise, and attacking antagonists from "the shadows", influenced many future stealth game series.

=== Survival horror ===
While elements of the survival horror genre can be traced back to the 1989 Capcom game Sweet Home, which served as a major influence on the genre, it was in the 1990s that survival horror was established as a genre. Another precursor appeared in 1992 when Infogrames released Alone in the Dark, which is also considered a forefather of the genre. The game featured a lone protagonist against hordes of monsters, and made use of traditional adventure game challenges such as puzzle-solving and finding hidden keys to new areas. Graphically, Alone in the Dark utilized static prerendered camera views that were cinematic in nature. Although players had the ability to fight monsters as in action games, players also had the option to evade or block them.

The term "survival horror" was first used by Capcom to market their 1996 release, Resident Evil, thus establishing it as a genre. The game was influenced by Capcom's Sweet Home, released seven years earlier. Resident Evil also adopted several features seen in Alone in the Dark, including puzzle-solving challenges and fixed cinematic camera angles. The control scheme in Resident Evil also became a staple of the genre, and future titles would imitate its challenge of rationing highly limited resources and items. The game's commercial success is credited with helping the PlayStation become the dominant game console, and also led to a series of Resident Evil films. Many games have tried to replicate the successful formula seen in Resident Evil, and every subsequent survival horror game has arguably taken a stance in relation to it.

Silent Hill (1999) drew heavily from Resident Evil while using realtime 3D environments in contrast to Resident Evil's pre-rendered graphics. The game was praised for moving away from B movie horror elements to the psychological style seen in art house or Japanese horror films, due to the game's emphasis on a disturbing atmosphere rather than visceral horror. The original Silent Hill is considered one of the scariest games of all time.

== Notable video-game franchises established in the 1990s ==
- 1080° Snowboarding (N64; 1998)
- Ace Combat (PS1; 1995)
- Aero the Acro-Bat (MD; 1993)
- Age of Empires (PC; 1997)
- Alone in the Dark (PC; 1992)
- Ape Escape (PS1; 1999)
- Army Men (PC; 1998)
- Art of Fighting (ARC; 1992)
- Baldur's Gate (PC; 1998)
- Banjo-Kazooie (N64; 1998)
- Battletoads (ARC; 1991)
- Beatmania (ARC; 1997)
- Bubsy (SNES; 1993)
- Chrono (SNES; 1995)
- Civilization (PC; 1991)
- Command & Conquer (PC; 1995)
- Conker (GBC; 1999) ^{2}
- Cool Spot (MD; 1993)
- Crash Bandicoot (PS1; 1996)
- Crazy Taxi (ARC; 1999)
- Croc (PS1; 1997)
- Cruis'n (ARC; 1994)
- Dance Dance Revolution (ARC; 1998)
- Darkstalkers (ARC; 1994)
- Daytona USA (ARC; 1993)
- Dead or Alive (ARC; 1996)
- Destruction Derby (PS1; 1995)
- Diablo (PC; 1997)
- Digimon (SAT; 1998) ^{1} ^{2}
- Donkey Kong Country (SNES; 1994)^{2}
- Doom (PC; 1993)
- Dr. Mario (NES; 1990) ^{2}
- Drum Mania (ARC; 1999)
- Duke Nukem (PC; 1991)
- Dungeon Keeper (PC; 1997)
- Dynasty Warriors (PS1; 1997)^{2}
- Earthworm Jim (MD; 1994)
- EverQuest (PC; 1999)
- Everybody's Golf (PS1; 1997)
- F-Zero (SNES; 1990)
- Fatal Fury (ARC; 1991)
- Fallout (PC; 1997)
- FIFA (MD; 1993)
- Fire Emblem (Famicom; 1990)
- Freddi Fish (PC; 1994)
- Gabriel Knight (PC; 1993)
- Game Tengoku (ARC; 1995)
- Gex (3DO; 1995)
- Gran Turismo (PS1; 1997)
- Grand Theft Auto (PC; 1997)
- Guitar Freaks (ARC; 1999)
- Half-Life (PC; 1998)
- Harvest Moon (SNES; 1996)
- Heroes of Might and Magic (PC; 1995)
- Homeworld (PC; 1999)
- Jazz Jackrabbit (PC; 1994) ^{2}
- Jurassic Park (NES; 1993) ^{1}
- Kirby (GB; 1992)
- Klonoa (PS1; 1997)
- Lemmings (AMI; 1991) ^{2}
- Lego (SP; 1995) ^{1} ^{2}
- Lunar (SCD; 1992)
- Mana (GB; 1991)
- Mario Kart (SNES; 1992)^{2}
- Mario Party (N64; 1998)^{2}
- Marvel vs. Capcom (ARC; 1996)^{2}
- Medal of Honor (PS1; 1999)
- MediEvil (PS1; 1998)
- Micro Machines (NES; 1991)
- Monkey Island (PC; 1990)
- Mortal Kombat (ARC; 1992)
- Myst (PC; 1993)
- NBA 2K (DC; 1999)
- NBA Jam (ARC; 1993)
- NBA Live (MD; 1994)
- NBA ShootOut (PS1; 1996)
- Need for Speed (3DO; 1994)
- Neverwinter Nights (PC; 1991)
- NFL 2K (DC; 1999)
- NFL Blitz (ARC; 1997) ^{2}
- NFL GameDay (PS1; 1995)
- NHL (MD; 1991)
- NHL FaceOff (PS1; 1995)
- Nights into Dreams (SAT; 1996)
- Oddworld (PS1; 1997)
- Pajama Sam (PC; 1996)
- Panzer Dragoon (SAT; 1995)
- PaRappa the Rapper (PS1; 1996)
- Parasite Eve (PS1; 1998)
- Persona (PS1; 1996) ^{2}
- PGA Tour (PC; 1990)
- Pilotwings (SNES; 1990)
- Pokémon (GB; 1996)
- Pop'n Music (ARC; 1998) ^{2}
- Postal (PC; 1997)
- Power Pros (SFC; 1994)
- Power Rangers (SNES; 1994) ^{1}
- Power Stone (ARC; 1999)
- Pump It Up (ARC; 1999)
- Putt-Putt (PC; 1992)
- Quake (PC; 1996)
- Rayman (JAG; 1995)
- Resident Evil (PS1; 1996)
- Ridge Racer (ARC; 1993)
- Road Rash (MD; 1991)
- Rollercoaster Tycoon (PC; 1999)
- Samba de Amigo (ARC; 1999)
- Samurai Shodown (ARC; 1993)
- Shenmue (DC; 1999)
- Shining (MD; 1991)
- Silent Hill (PS1; 1999)
- Sonic the Hedgehog (MD; 1991)
- Soulcalibur (ARC; 1995)
- South Park (N64; 1998) ^{1}
- Space Channel 5 (DC; 1999)
- Spec Ops (PC; 1998)
- Spyro (PS1; 1998)
- StarCraft (PC; 1998)
- Star Control (PC; 1990)
- Star Fox (SNES; 1993)
- Star Ocean (SFC; 1996)
- Star Wars: Rogue Squadron (N64; 1998)^{1}
- Streets of Rage (MD; 1991)
- Super Smash Bros. (N64; 1999)
- Syphon Filter (PS1; 1999)
- System Shock (PC; 1994)
- Tales (SFC; 1995)
- Tekken (ARC; 1994)
- The Elder Scrolls (PC; 1994)
- The House of the Dead (ARC; 1997)
- The King of Fighters (ARC; 1994) ^{2}
- The Simpsons (ARC; 1991) ^{1}
- Thief (PC; 1998)
- Time Crisis (ARC; 1995)
- Tokimeki Memorial (SCD; 1994)
- Tom Clancy's Rainbow Six (PC; 1998)
- Tomb Raider (PC; 1996)
- Tony Hawk's (PS1; 1999)
- Toukon Retsuden (PS1; 1995)
- Triple Play (MD; 1995)
- Turok (N64; 1997)
- Twisted Metal (PS1; 1995)
- Ultima Online (PC; 1997)^{2}
- Unreal (PC; 1998)
- Virtua Fighter (ARC; 1993)
- Warcraft (PC; 1994)
- Warhawk (PS1; 1995)
- Wario (GB; 1994)^{2}
- Wave Race (GB; 1992)
- Wild Arms (PS1; 1996)
- Wing Commander (PC; 1990)
- Winning Eleven (PS1; 1995)
- Wipeout (PS1; 1995)
- Worms (PC; 1995)
- XCOM (PC; 1994)
- Yoshi (NES; 1991)^{2}
- You Don't Know Jack (PC; 1995)
- Yu-Gi-Oh! (PS1; 1998) ^{1}

Notes:

- ^{1}Game franchises that also accompany major film or television franchises.
- ^{2}Game franchises that are considered spin-offs of previously established franchises.

== Financial performance ==
=== Highest-grossing arcade games of the decade ===
The following titles were the highest-grossing arcade games of each year in the 1990s, in terms of coin drop earnings.

Highest-grossing arcade games of the 1990s
Year	Market	Title	Developer	Manufacturer	Genre	Revenue	Inflation	Ref
1990	Japan	Final Fight	Capcom	Capcom	Beat 'em up	Unknown	Unknown	
1990	United States	Teenage Mutant Ninja Turtles	Konami	Konami	Beat 'em up	Unknown	Unknown	
1991	Worldwide	Street Fighter II: The World Warrior	Capcom	Capcom	Fighting	Unknown	Unknown	
1992	Worldwide	Street Fighter II: The World Warrior	Capcom	Capcom	Fighting	Unknown	Unknown	
1993	Worldwide	Street Fighter II	Capcom	Capcom	Fighting	$1,500,000,000	$3,400,000,000	
1994	Japan	Super Street Fighter II X: Grand Master Challenge	Capcom	Capcom	Fighting	Unknown	Unknown	
1994	Japan	Virtua Fighter	Sega AM2	Sega	Fighting	Unknown	Unknown	
1994	United States	Daytona USA	Sega AM2	Sega	Racing	Unknown	Unknown	
1994	United States	Mortal Kombat II	Midway	Midway	Fighting	Unknown	Unknown	
1995	Japan	Virtua Fighter 2	Sega AM2	Sega	Fighting	Unknown	Unknown	
1995	United States	Daytona USA	Sega AM2	Sega	Racing	Unknown	Unknown	
1995	United States	Neo Geo MVS	SNK	SNK	System	Unknown	Unknown	
1995	United States	Mortal Kombat 3	Midway	Midway	Fighting	Unknown	Unknown	
1996	Japan	Street Fighter Zero 2 (Street Fighter Alpha 2)	Capcom	Capcom	Fighting	Unknown	Unknown	
1996	Japan	Virtua Fighter 2 / 2.1	Sega AM2	Sega	Fighting	Unknown	Unknown	
1997	Japan	Virtua Fighter 3	Sega AM2	Sega	Fighting	Unknown	Unknown	
1997	Japan	Print Club 2	Atlus	Sega	Purikura	Unknown	Unknown	
1998	Japan	Tekken 3	Namco	Namco	Fighting	Unknown	Unknown	
1999	Japan	Virtua Striker 2 ver. 98 / 99	Sega AM2	Sega	Sports	Unknown	Unknown	
1990s	Worldwide	Street Fighter II	Capcom	Capcom	Fighting	$5,310,000,000+	$1.26×10^{10}+	

=== Best-selling home video games of the decade ===
The following table lists home video games of the 1990s that sold at least 5 million copies.

Best-selling home video games of the 1990s (as of 2017)
Title	Units sold	Initial release date	Platform(s)	Genre(s)	Developer(s)	Publisher(s)	Ref
Pokémon Red / Green / Blue / Yellow	46.02 million	February 27, 1996	Game Boy	Role-playing	Game Freak	Nintendo	(Note: Pokémon Red/Green/Blue sold 31.38 million. Pokémon Yellow sold 14.64 million.)
Pokémon Gold / Silver	23.1 million	November 21, 1999	Game Boy Color	Role-playing	Game Freak	Nintendo	
Super Mario World	20.61 million	November 21, 1990	SNES	Platformer	Nintendo EAD	Nintendo	
Lemmings	20 million	February 14, 1991	Multi-platform	Puzzle	DMA Design	Psygnosis	
Sonic the Hedgehog	15 million	June 23, 1991	Mega Drive/Genesis	Platformer	Sonic Team	Sega	
Street Fighter II	14.05 million	June 10, 1992	SNES, Mega Drive	Fighting	Capcom	Capcom	
Super Mario 64	11.91 million	June 23, 1996	Nintendo 64	Platformer	Nintendo EAD	Nintendo	
Super Mario Land 2: 6 Golden Coins	11.18 million	October 21, 1992	Game Boy	Platformer	Nintendo R&D1	Nintendo	
Final Fantasy VII	11.02 million	January 31, 1997	PlayStation, Windows	Role-playing	Square	Square, Sony Computer Entertainment, Eidos	(Note: Final Fantasy VII: PlayStation – 10,022,228; Worldwide sales as of 2005 – 9.8 million; Japan sales during 2006–2007 – 222,228; The Best – 158,458 (in 2006); Ultimate Hits – 63,770 (during 2006–2007); Windows (Eidos release) – 1 million+)
Gran Turismo	10.85 million	December 23, 1997	PlayStation	Sim racing	Polyphony Digital	Sony Computer Entertainment	
Super Mario All-Stars	10.55 million	July 14, 1993	SNES	Platformer	Nintendo EAD	Nintendo	
Dr. Mario	10.19 million	July 27, 1990	Game Boy, NES	Puzzle	Nintendo R&D1	Nintendo	(Note: 5.34 million for the Game Boy version. 4.85 million for the NES version.)
Mario Kart 64	9.87 million	December 14, 1996	Nintendo 64	Kart racing	Nintendo EAD	Nintendo	
Gran Turismo 2	9.37 million	December 11, 1999	PlayStation	Sim racing	Polyphony Digital	Sony Computer Entertainment	
Donkey Kong Country	9.3 million	November 21, 1994	SNES	Platformer	Rare	Nintendo	
Super Mario Kart	8.76 million	August 27, 1992	SNES	Kart racing	Nintendo EAD	Nintendo	
Final Fantasy VIII	8.6 million	February 11, 1999	PlayStation	Role-playing	Square	Square, Square Electronic Arts	
Tekken 3	8.3 million	March 26, 1998	PlayStation	Fighting	Namco	Namco, Sony Computer Entertainment	
GoldenEye 007	8.09 million	August 25, 1997	Nintendo 64	First-person shooter, stealth	Rare	Nintendo	
The Legend of Zelda: Ocarina of Time	7.6 million	November 21, 1998	Nintendo 64	Action-adventure	Nintendo EAD	Nintendo	
Sonic the Hedgehog 2	7.55 million	November 21, 1992	Mega Drive/Genesis	Platformer	Sega	Sega	(Note: North America – 5 million as of 1996 United Kingdom – 1.4 million+ (1 million in 1992, 400,000+ in 1993) France, Germany, Spain, Austria – 750,000 as of 1992 Japan – 400,000 as of March 1993)
Tomb Raider	7.1 million	October 25, 1996	Multi-platform	Action-adventure	Core Design	Eidos Interactive	
Metal Gear Solid	7 million	September 3, 1998	PlayStation	Action-adventure, stealth	Konami	Konami	
Crash Bandicoot	6.82 million	September 9, 1996	PlayStation	Platformer	Naughty Dog	Sony Computer Entertainment	
Tomb Raider II	6.8 million	November 21, 1997	Multi-platform	Action-adventure	Core Design	Eidos Interactive	
Mortal Kombat	6.5 million	September 13, 1993	Consoles	Fighting	Midway Games	Acclaim Entertainment	
NBA Jam	6 million	March 4, 1994	Genesis, SNES	Sports	Midway Games	Acclaim Entertainment	
Tomb Raider III	5.9 million	November 20, 1998	Multi-platform	Action-adventure	Core Design	Eidos Interactive	
Resident Evil 2	5.77 million	January 21, 1998	PlayStation	Survival horror	Capcom	Capcom, Virgin Interactive	(Note: Resident Evil 2 (PlayStation): Resident Evil 2 – 4.96 million; Dual Shock Ver. – 810,000)
Tekken 2	5.7 million	March 29, 1996	PlayStation	Fighting	Namco	Namco, Sony Computer Entertainment	
Crash Bandicoot: Warped	5.7 million	October 31, 1998	PlayStation	Platformer	Naughty Dog	Sony Computer Entertainment	
Super Smash Bros.	5.55 million	January 21, 1999	Nintendo 64	Fighting	HAL Laboratory	Nintendo	
Pokémon Stadium	5.46 million	April 30, 1999	Nintendo 64	Strategy	Nintendo EAD, HAL Laboratory	Nintendo	
Pokémon Pinball	5.31 million	April 14, 1999	Game Boy Color	Pinball	Jupiter, HAL Laboratory	Nintendo	
Donkey Kong 64	5.27 million	November 22, 1999	Nintendo 64	Platformer, adventure	Rare	Nintendo	
Wario Land: Super Mario Land 3	5.19 million	January 21, 1994	Game Boy	Platformer	Nintendo R&D1	Nintendo	
Crash Bandicoot 2: Cortex Strikes Back	5.17 million	October 31, 1997	PlayStation	Platformer	Naughty Dog	Sony Computer Entertainment	
Donkey Kong Country 2: Diddy's Kong Quest	5.15 million	November 21, 1995	SNES	Platformer	Rare	Nintendo	
Kirby's Dream Land	5.13 million	April 27, 1992	Game Boy	Action, platformer	HAL Laboratory	Nintendo	
Resident Evil	5.08 million	March 22, 1996	PlayStation	Survival horror	Capcom	Capcom, Virgin Interactive	
Super Mario Bros. Deluxe	5.07 million	May 1, 1999	Game Boy Color	Platformer	Nintendo EAD	Nintendo	

=== Best-selling game consoles of the decade ===
Best-selling video game consoles of the 1990s
Rank	Manufacturer	Console	Type	Generation	Release	Sales				
Rank	Manufacturer	Console	Type	Generation	Release	Japan	North America	Europe	Other regions	Worldwide
1	Nintendo	Game Boy / Game Boy Color	Handheld	8-bit	1989	26,670,000	Unknown	Unknown	Unknown	94,360,000
2	Sony	PlayStation	Home	32-bit	1994	17,280,000	26,390,000	28,150,000	—N/a	78,140,000
3	Nintendo	Super Famicom/Super NES	Home	16-bit	1990	17,130,000	20,000,000	5,280,000+ (Note: SNES sales in Western Europe: Belgium – 70,000 (1994); France – 1 million (1994); Germany – 1.4 million in Germany (1994); Italy – 200,000 (1994); Netherlands – 130,000 (1994); Spain – 630,000 (1998); United Kingdom – 1.05 million (1994); Other countries – 500,000 (1994))	900,000+	48,980,000
4	Sega	Mega Drive / Genesis	Home	16-bit	1988	2,380,000	20,000,000	8,170,000+ (Note: Mega Drive sales in Western Europe: Belgium – 160,000 (1994); France – 1.3 million (1994); Germany – 800,000 in Germany (1994); Italy – 400,000 (1994); Netherlands – 160,000 (1994); Spain – 450,000 (1993); United Kingdom – 3 million (June 1996); Other countries – 1.9 million (1994))	1,000,000+	31,550,000+
5	Nintendo	Nintendo 64	Home	64-bit	1996	5,290,000	Unknown	Unknown	Unknown	29,570,000
6	Nintendo	Famicom/NES	Home	8-bit	1983	4,390,000	12,000,000+	7,025,000+	340,000+	23,755,000+
7	Sega	Game Gear	Handheld	8-bit	1990	1,980,000	2,700,000+	520,000+	Unknown	10,620,000+
8	Sega	Sega Saturn	Home	32-bit	1994	5,750,000	Unknown	Unknown	Unknown	9,260,000
9	Sega	Mark III/Master System	Home	8-bit	1985	Unknown	300,000+	6,100,000+	600,000+	7,000,000+
10	Micro Genius	Dendy (Famiclone)	Home	8-bit	1992	—N/a	—N/a	6,000,000		6,000,000
11	Sega	Dreamcast	Home	128-bit	1998	1,850,000	1,700,000+	500,000+		4,050,000+
12	NEC	PC Engine/TurboGrafx-16	Home	8-bit/16-bit	1987	3,490,000	450,000+	Unknown	Unknown	3,940,000+
13	Sega	Mega-CD/Sega CD	Home	16-bit	1991	850,000	1,500,000	415,000+	Unknown	2,765,000
14	Various (mainlyPanasonic)	3DO	Home	32-bit	1993	750,000	185,000+	15,000+	5,000+	1,320,000
15	Various (mainly Philips)	CD-i	Home	16-bit	1990		350,000+	403,000+	45,000+	1,000,000
16	Atari	Atari Lynx	Handheld	8-bit	1989	Unknown	Unknown	Unknown	Unknown	1,000,000
17	Sega	Genesis Nomad	Handheld	16-bit	1995	1,000,000	—N/a	—N/a	—N/a	1,000,000
18	NEC	PC Engine GT/TurboExpress	Handheld	8-bit	1990	Unknown	Unknown	Unknown	Unknown	1,000,000+
19	SNK	Neo Geo AES	Home	16-bit	1991	800,000+	Unknown	Unknown	Unknown	100,000+
20	SNK	Neo Geo Pocket Color	Handheld	16-bit	1999	Unknown	Unknown	Unknown	Unknown	1,000,000
21	Sega	32X	Home	32-bit	1994	Unknown	300,000+	65,000+	Unknown	800,000
22	Nintendo	Virtual Boy	Handheld	32-bit	1995	140,000	Unknown	Unknown	Unknown	770,000
23	SNK	Neo Geo CD	Home	16-bit	1994	450,000+	Unknown	Unknown	Unknown	570,000+
24	Atari	Jaguar	Home	32-bit	1993	Unknown	Unknown	Unknown	Unknown	< 150,000

== Other ==
- In the late 1990s Nintendo released their earliest Mario Party in which players competed against each other to win minigames.
- Fighting games like Capcom's Street Fighter II, Sega's futuristic Virtua Fighter and the more violent Mortal Kombat from Acclaim prompted the video game industry to adopt a game rating system, and hundreds of knock-offs were widely popular in the mid-to-late 1990s.
- The real-time strategy (RTS) genre is introduced in 1992 with the release of Dune II. Warcraft: Orcs & Humans (1994) popularizes the genre, with Command & Conquer and Warcraft II: Tides of Darkness in 1995 sets up the first major real-time strategy competition and popularizes multiplayer capabilities in RTS games. StarCraft in 1998 becomes the second best-selling computer game of all time. It remains among the most popular multiplayer RTS games to this day, especially in South Korea. Homeworld in 1999 becomes the first successful 3D RTS game. The rise of the RTS genre is often credited with the fall of the turn-based strategy (TBS) genre, popularized with Civilization in 1991.
- Final Fantasy debuted (in North America) in 1990 for the NES, and remains among the most popular video game franchises, with numerous sequels, spin-offs, movies and related titles. Final Fantasy VII, released in 1997, especially popularized the series.
- Pokémon entered the world scene with the release of Pokémon Red and Green on the original Game Boy in Japan in 1996, later released as Pokémon Red and Blue for their worldwide release in 1998. It soon became popular in the US and has been adapted into an anime series and trading card game, among other media forms. Its popularity remained well into the first decade of the 21st century with several new games and spin-offs.
- Sonic Adventure was a launch title for the Dreamcast. It featured realistic graphics, 6 stories and fast gameplay; this became the best-selling Dreamcast game, selling 2.5 million units.

== Hardware timeline ==
The following gallery highlights hardware used to predominantly play games throughout the 1990s.

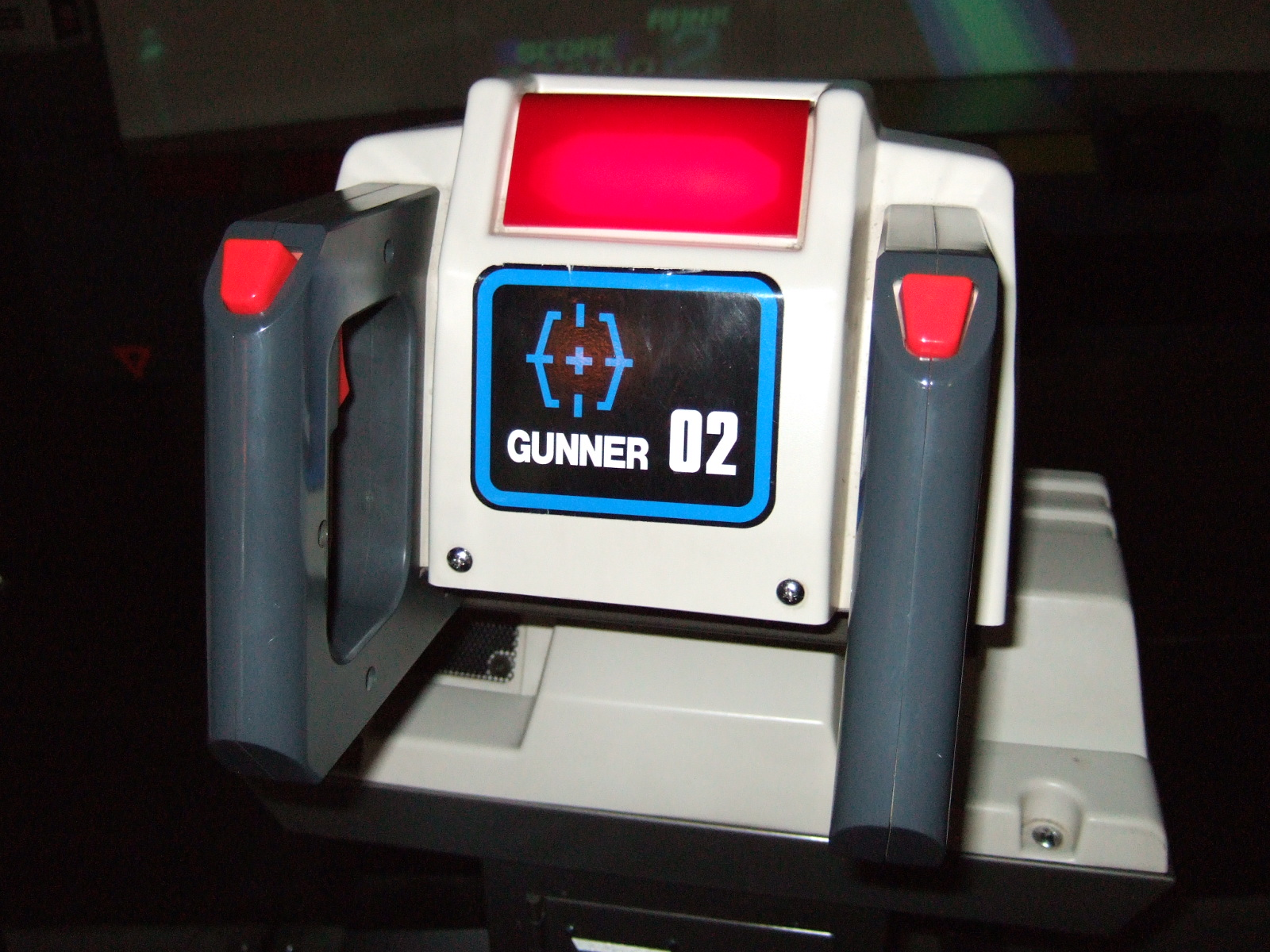
Galaxian3: Project Dragoon (1990)

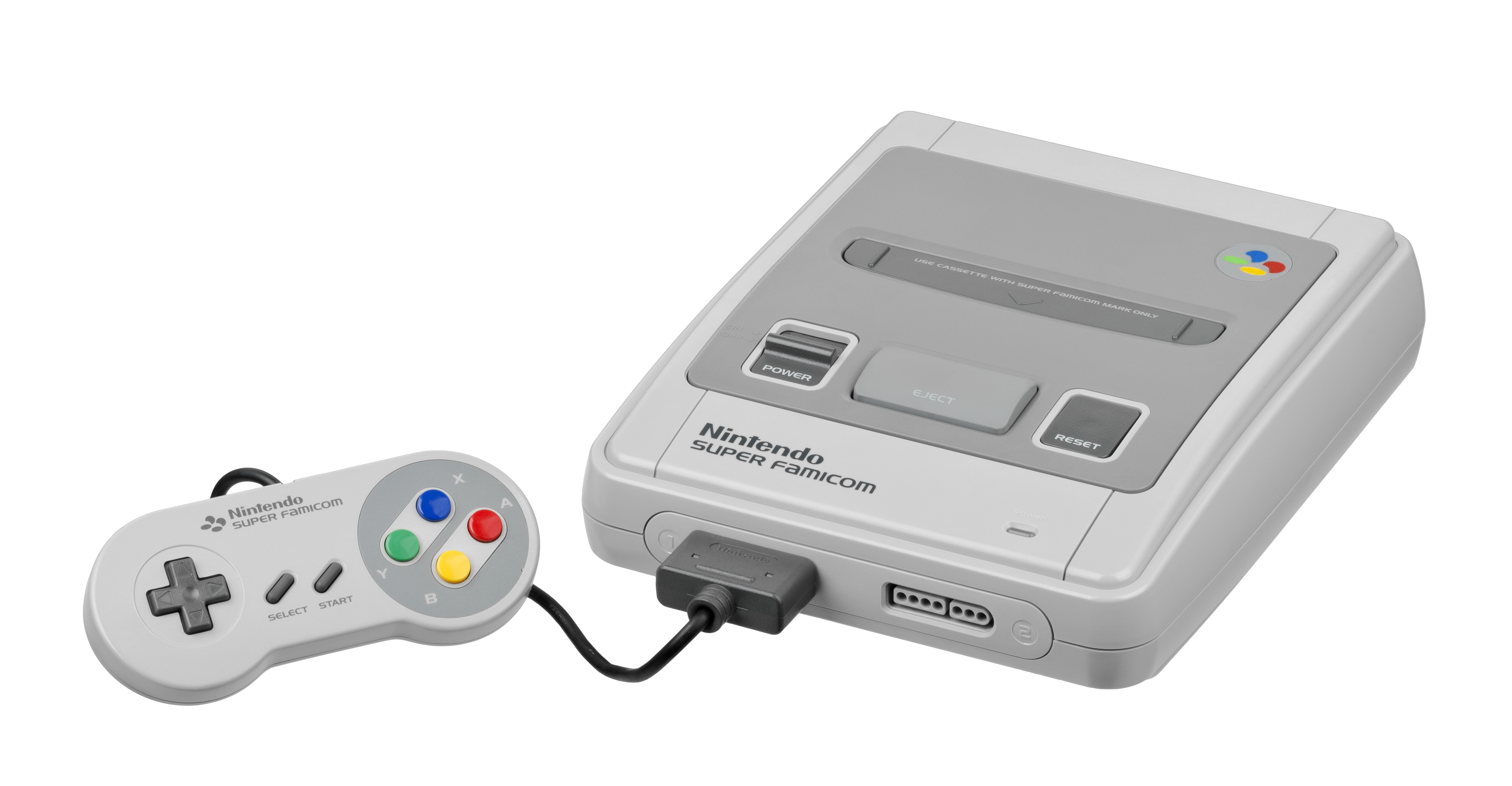
Super Famicom/Super Nintendo Entertainment System (1990)

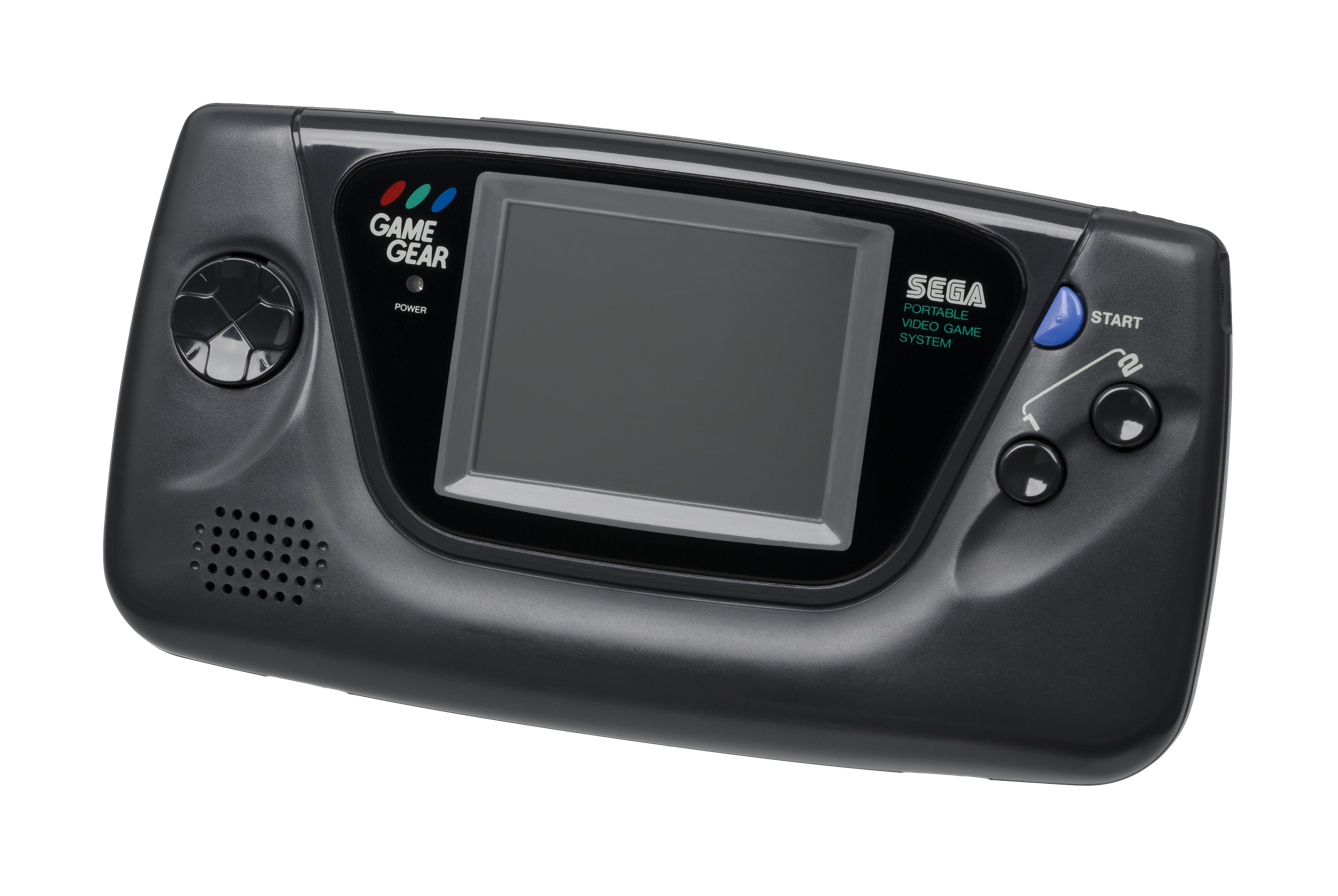
Game Gear (1990)

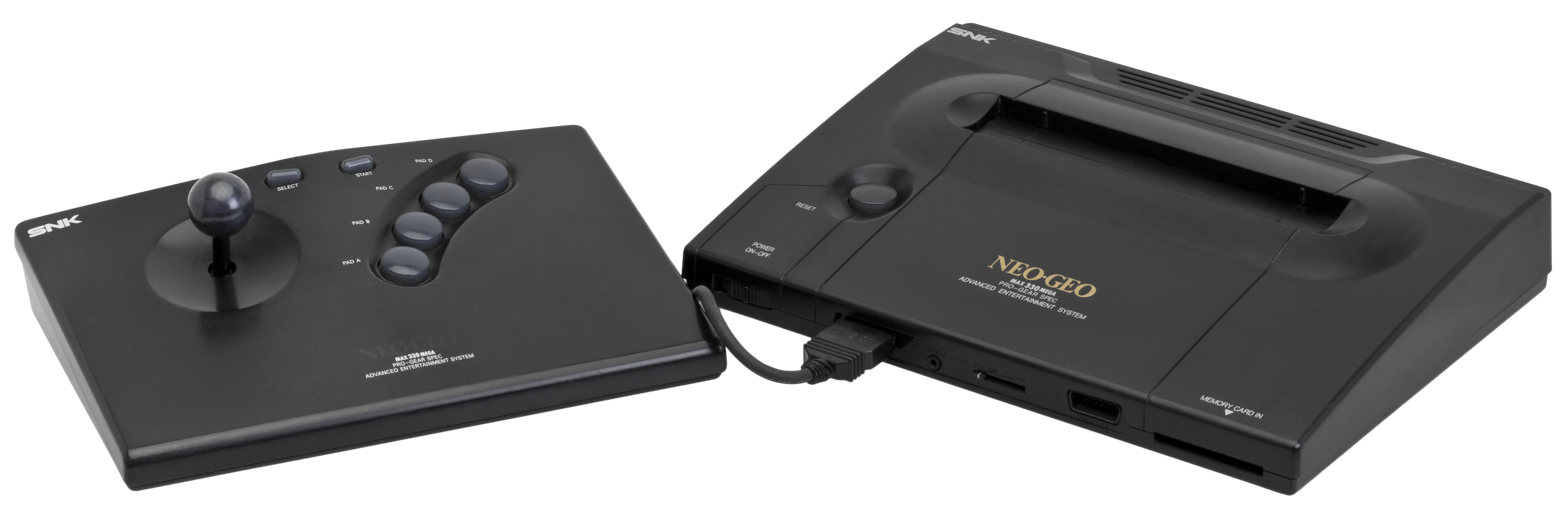
Neo Geo (1990)

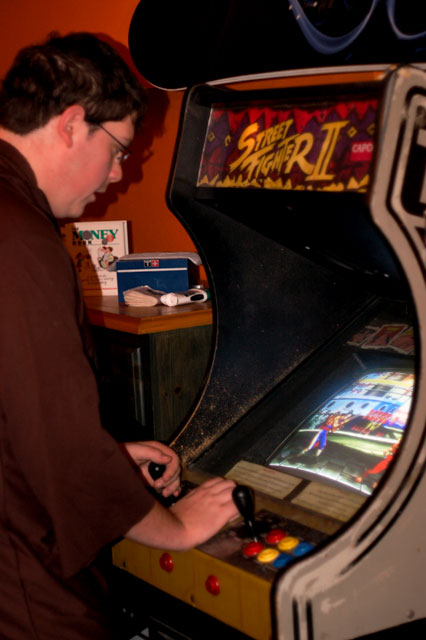
Street Fighter II (arcade, 1991)

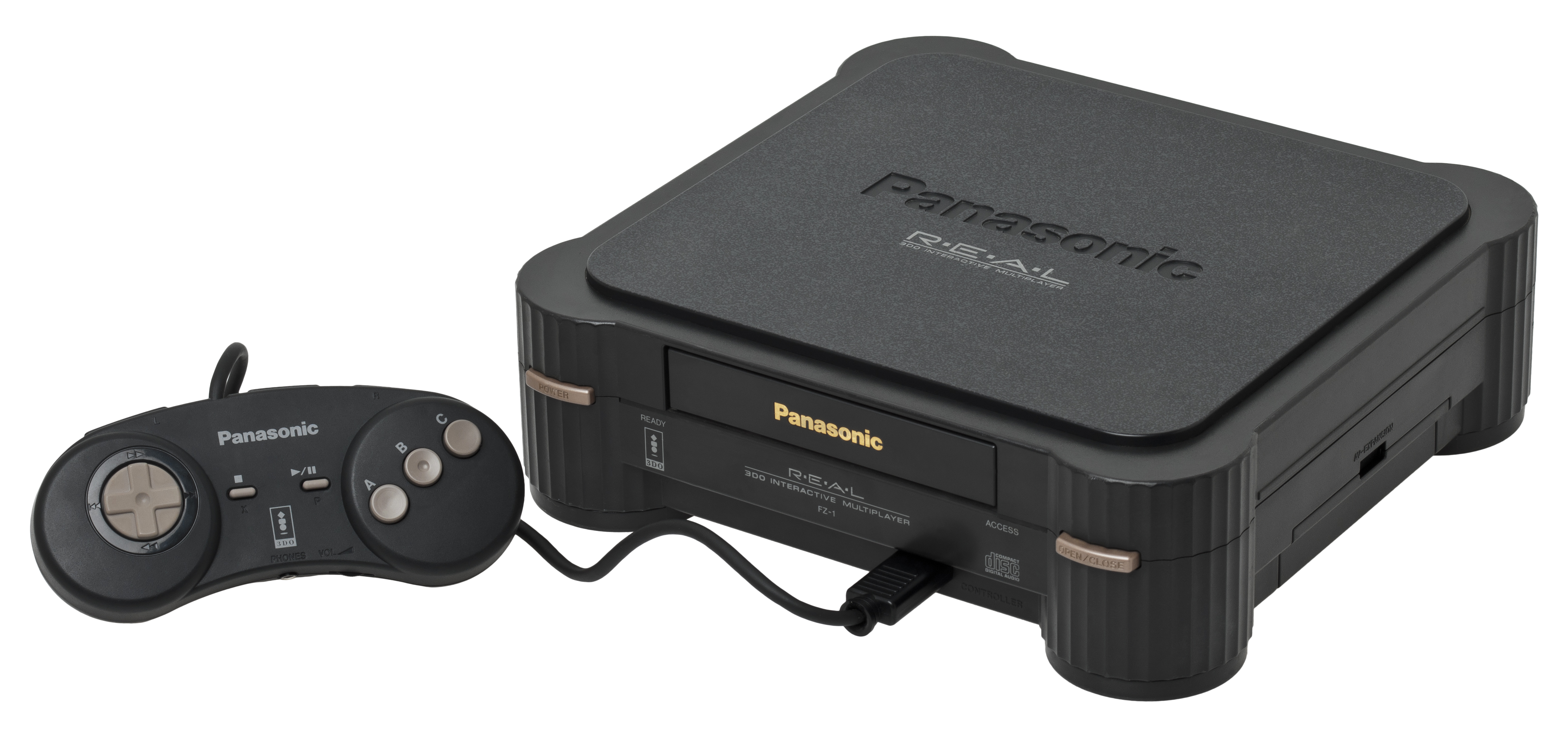
3DO Interactive Multiplayer (1993)

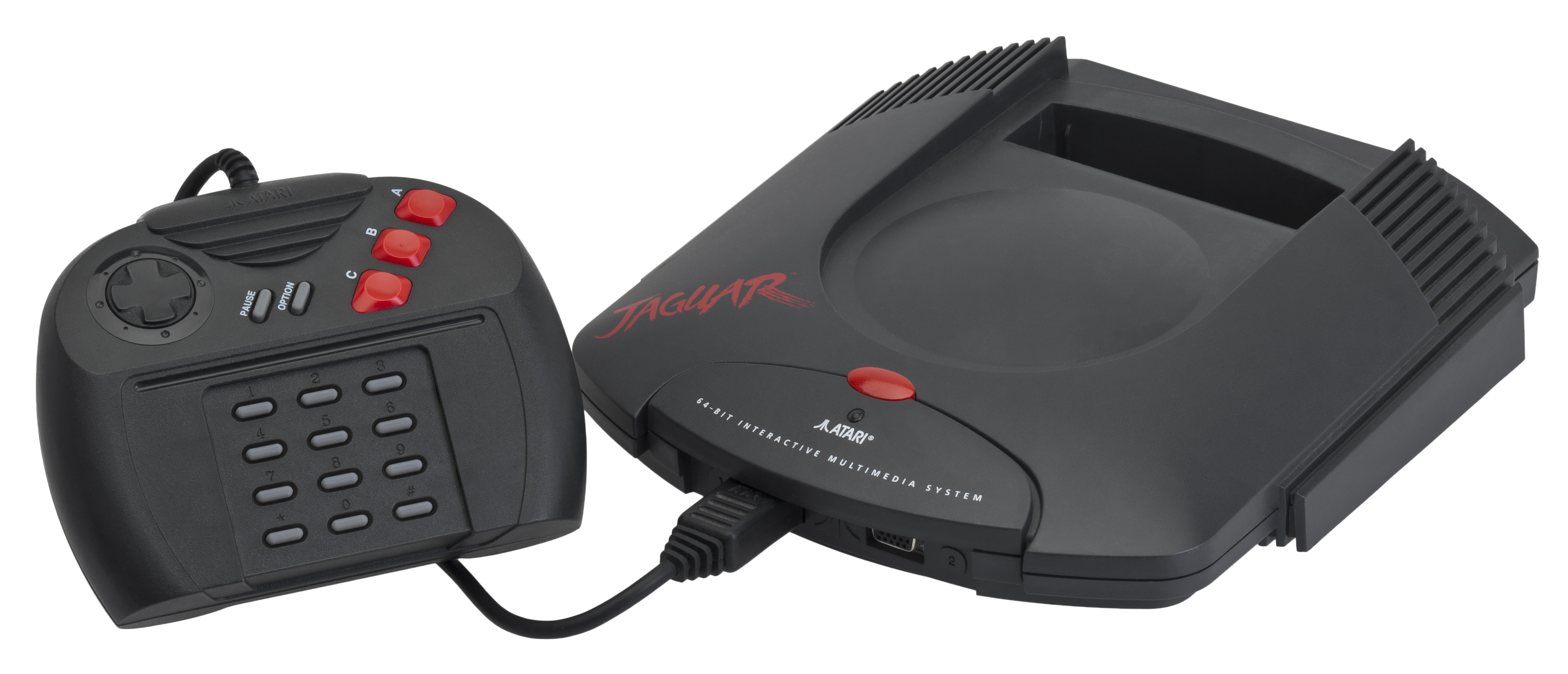
Atari Jaguar (1993)

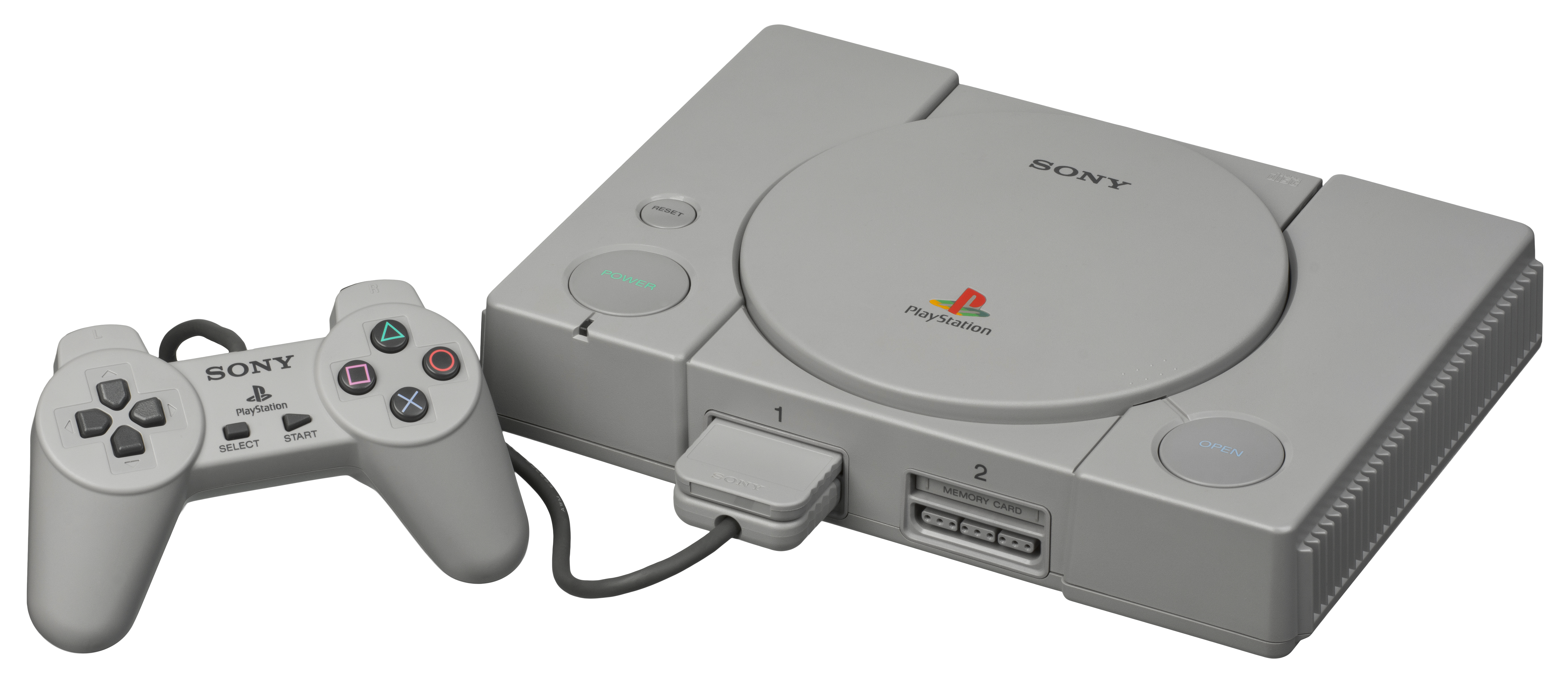
PlayStation (1994)

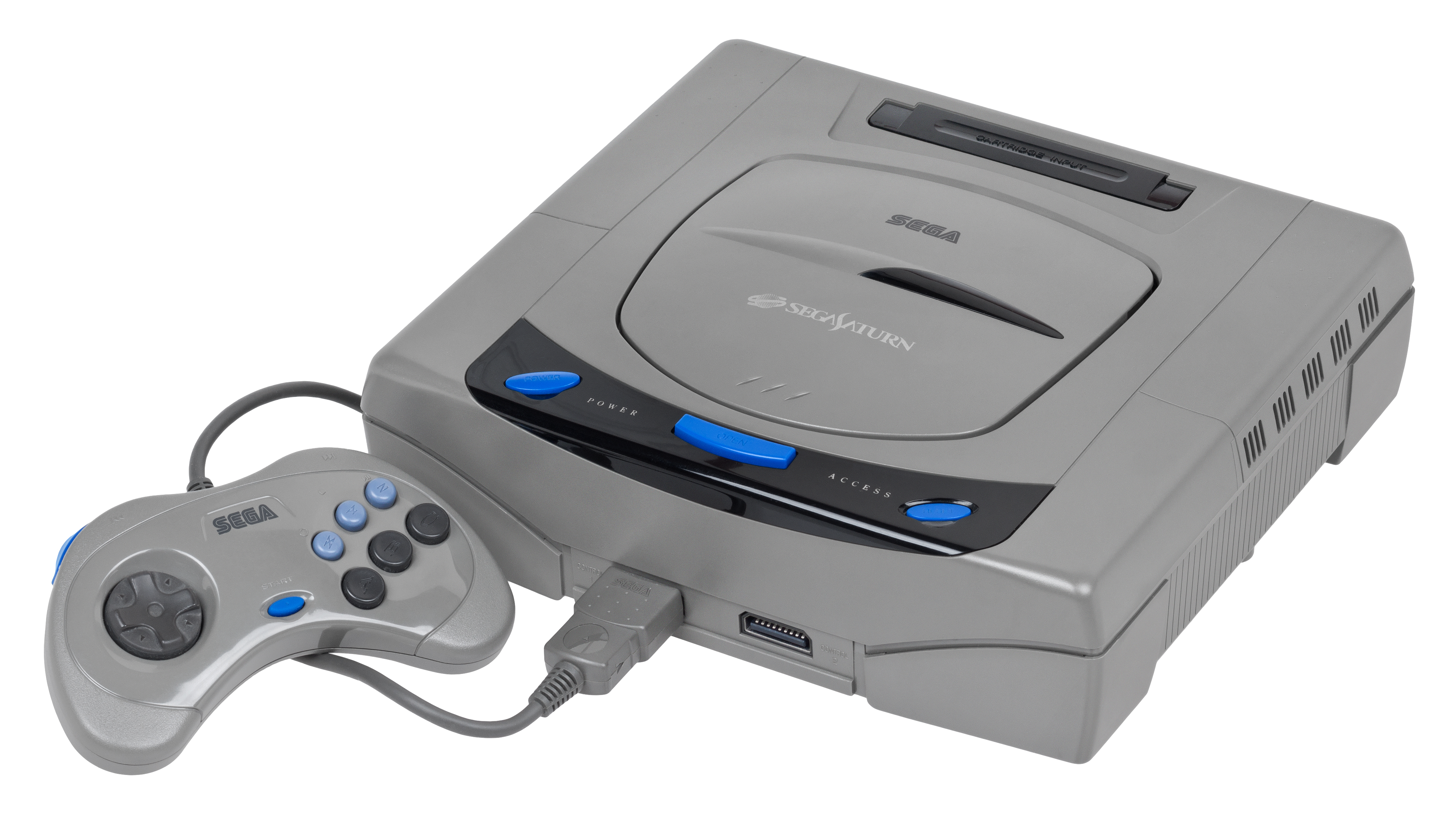
Sega Saturn (1994)

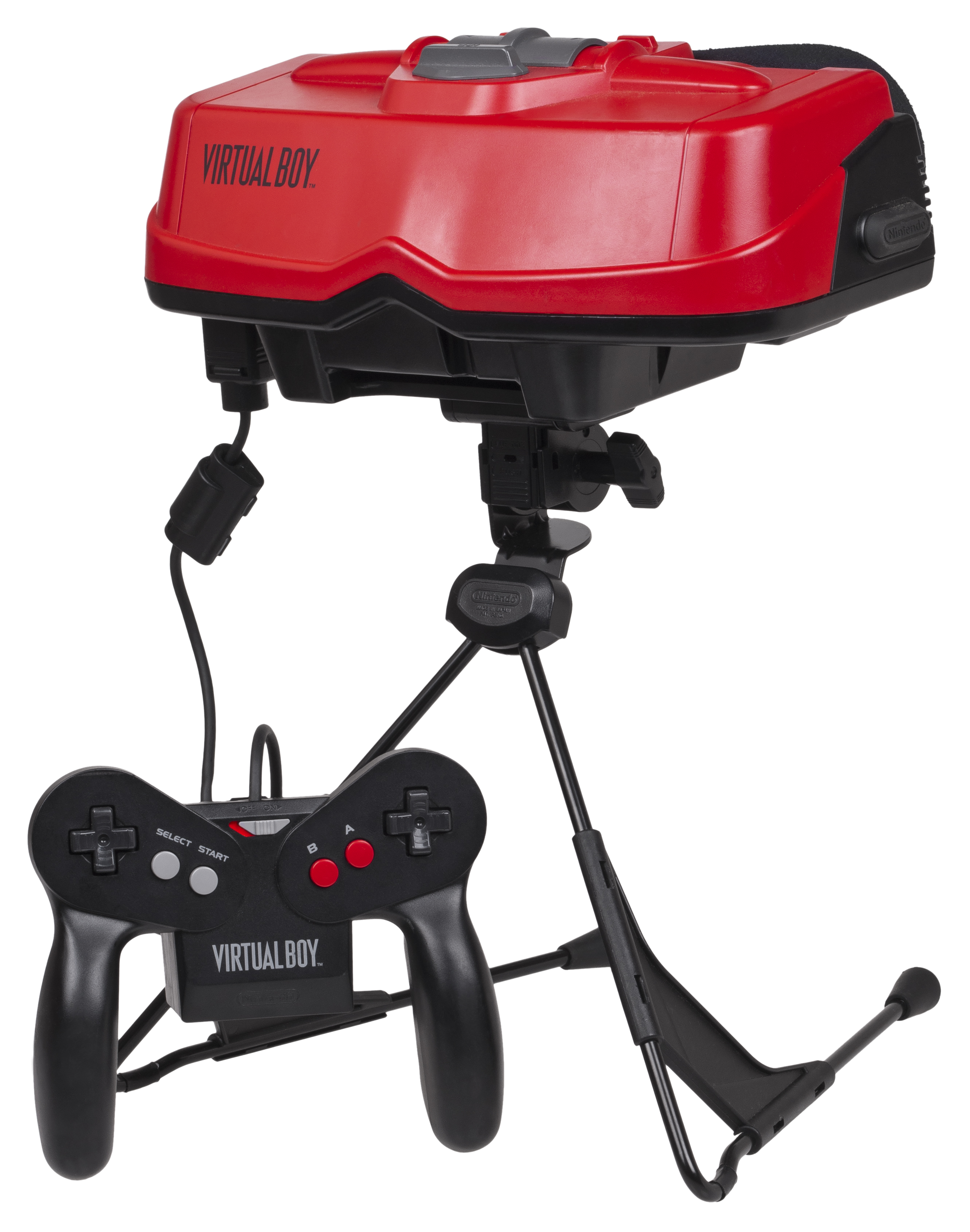
Virtual Boy (1995)

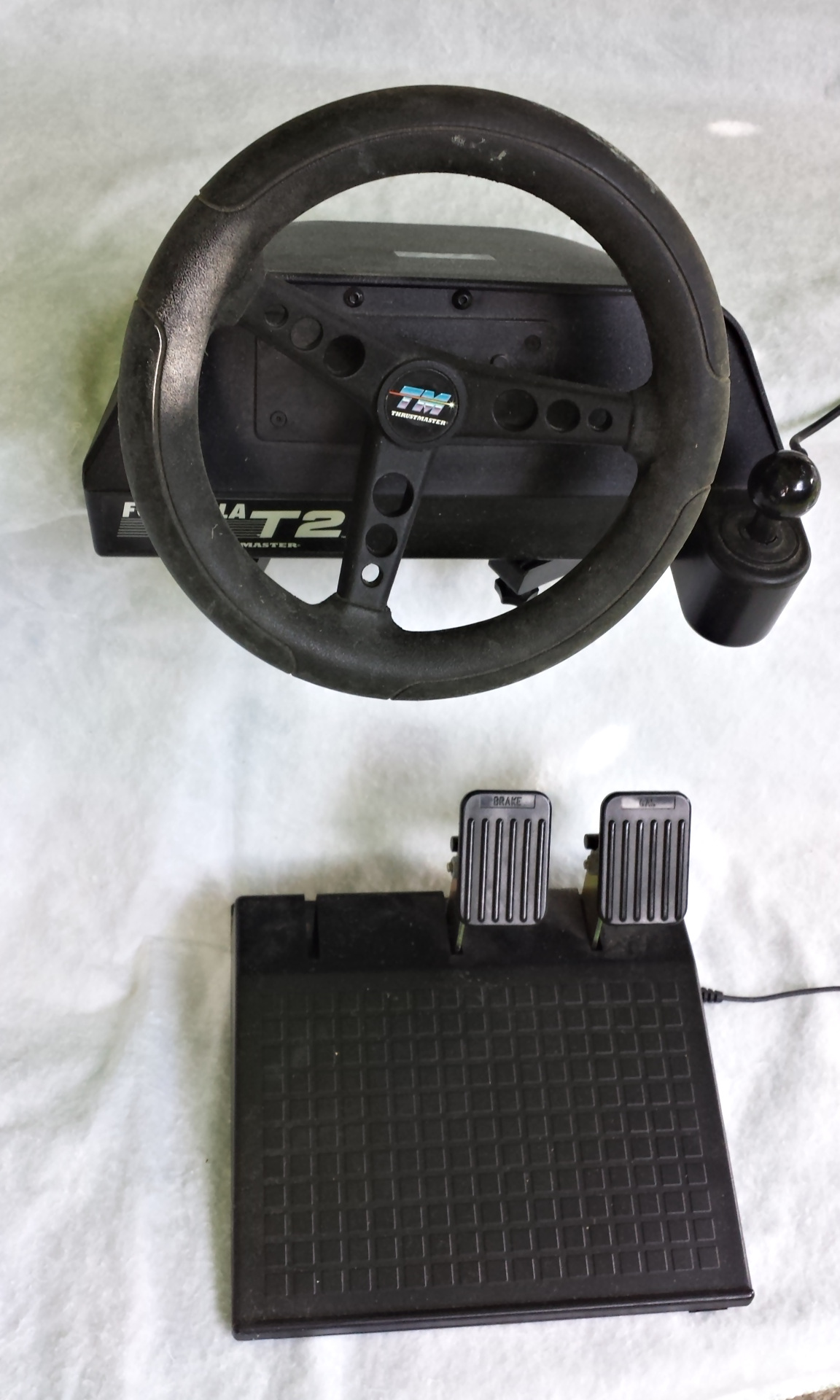
Thrustmaster T2 (1996)

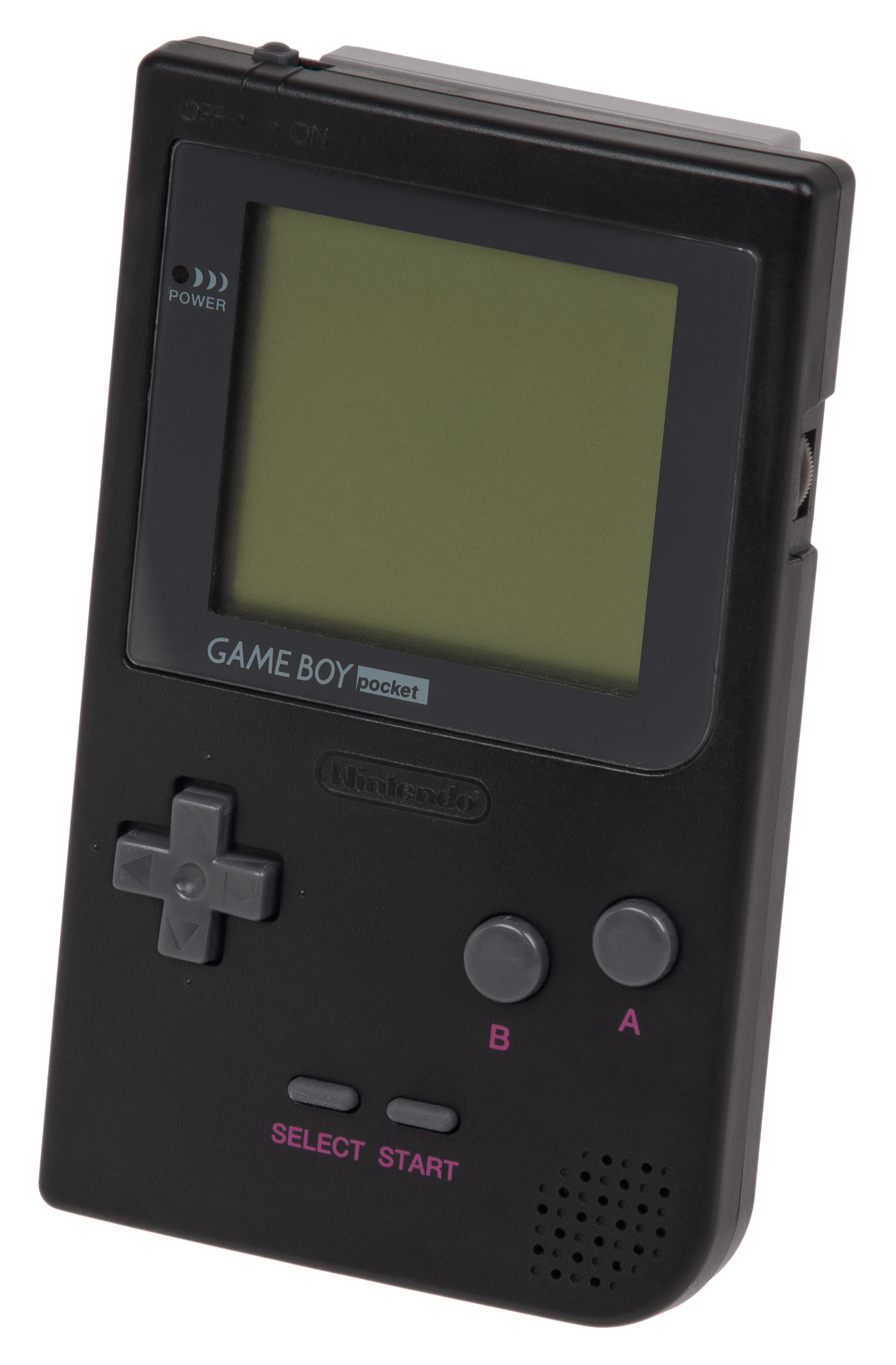
Game Boy Pocket (1996)

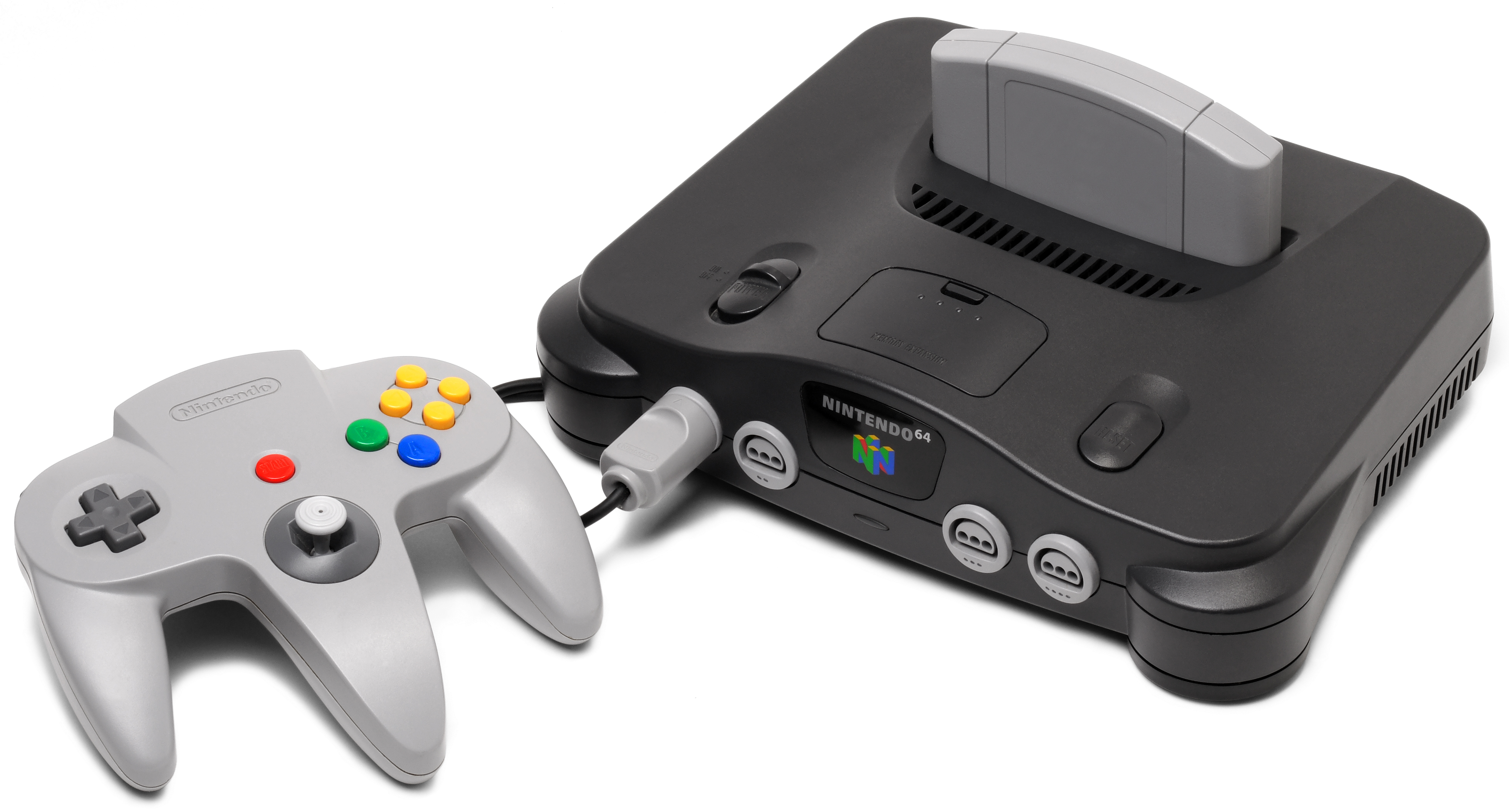
Nintendo 64 (1996)

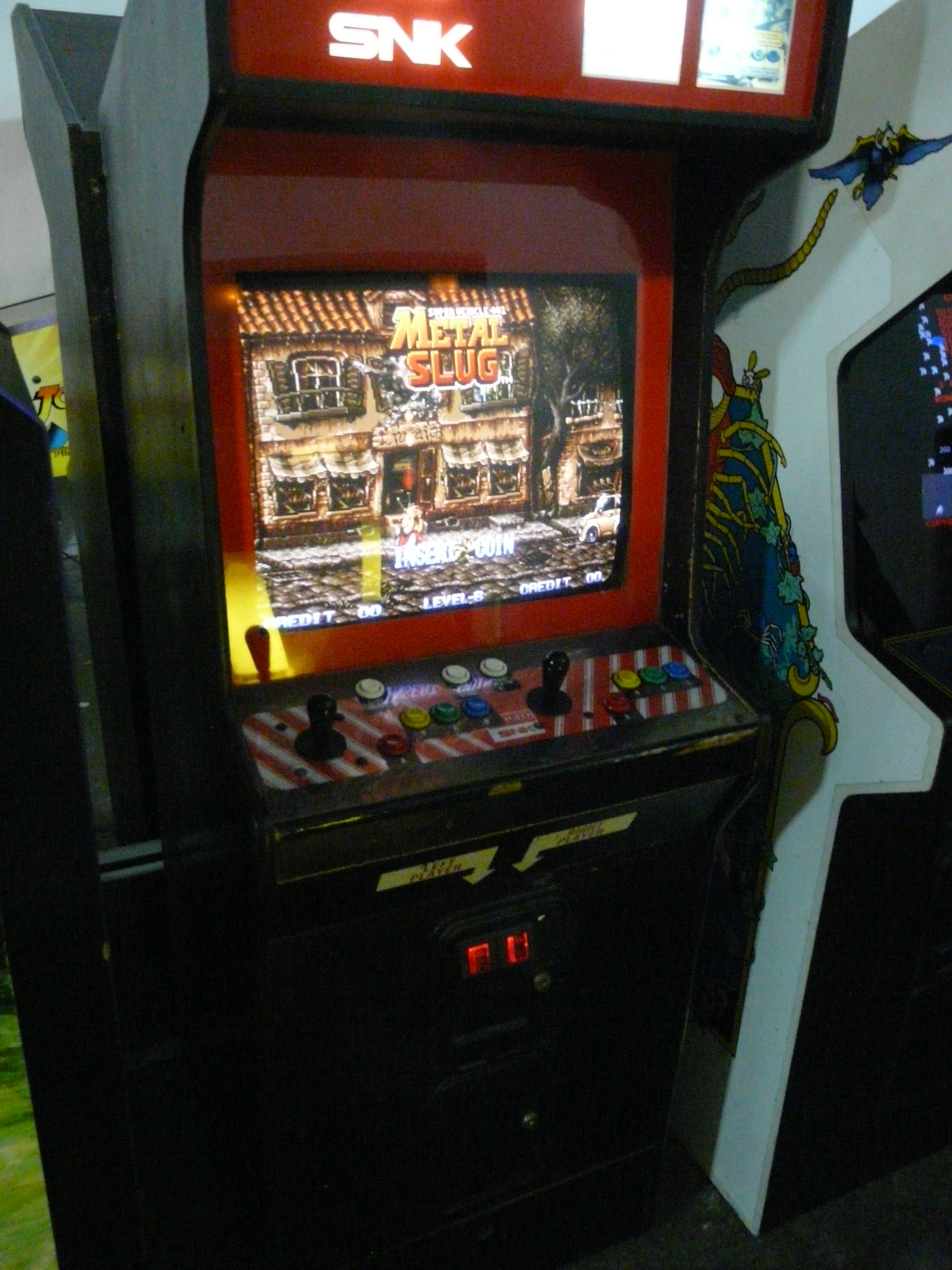
Metal Slug (arcade, 1996)

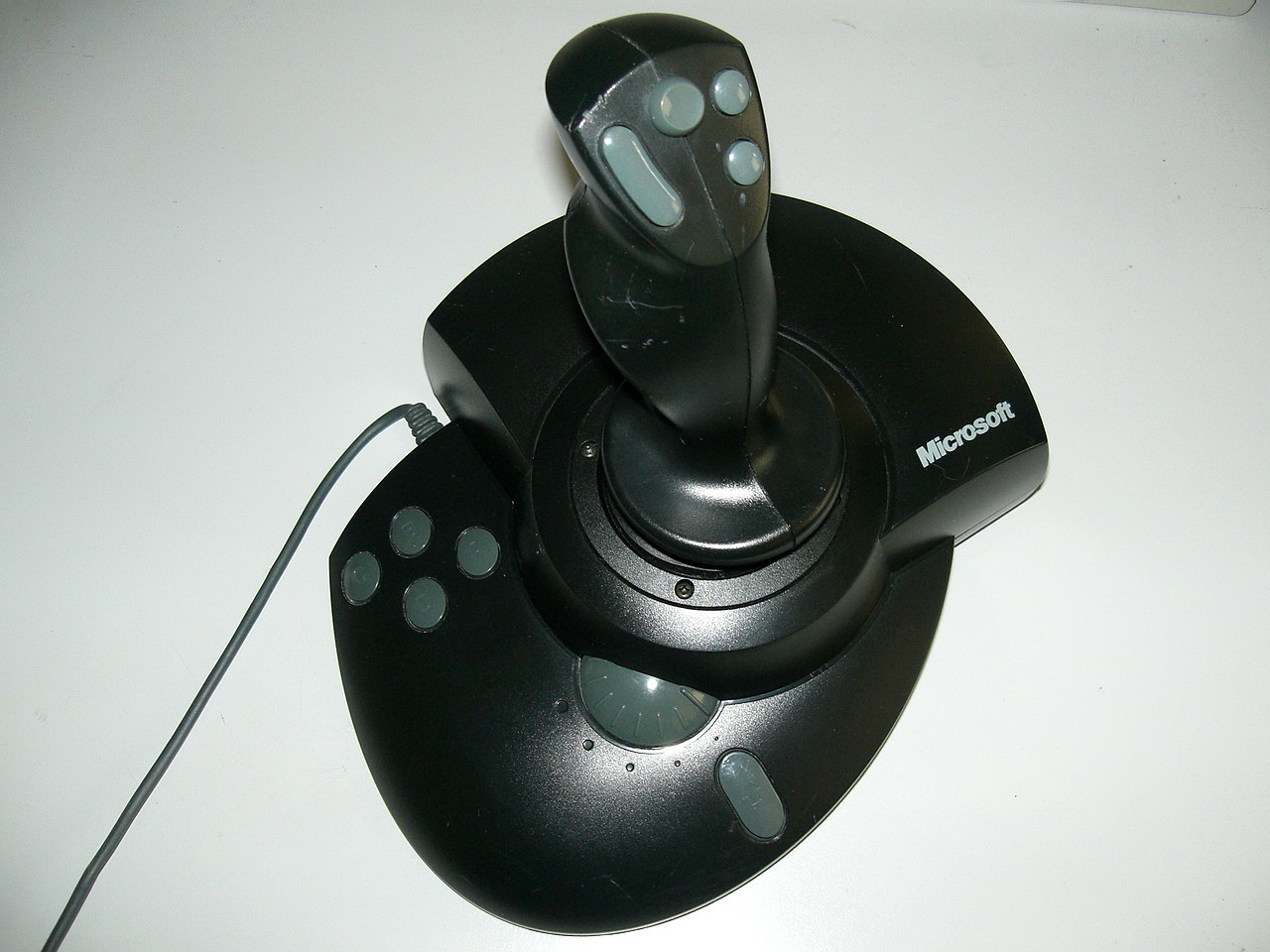
Microsoft SideWinder Force Feedback Pro (1997)

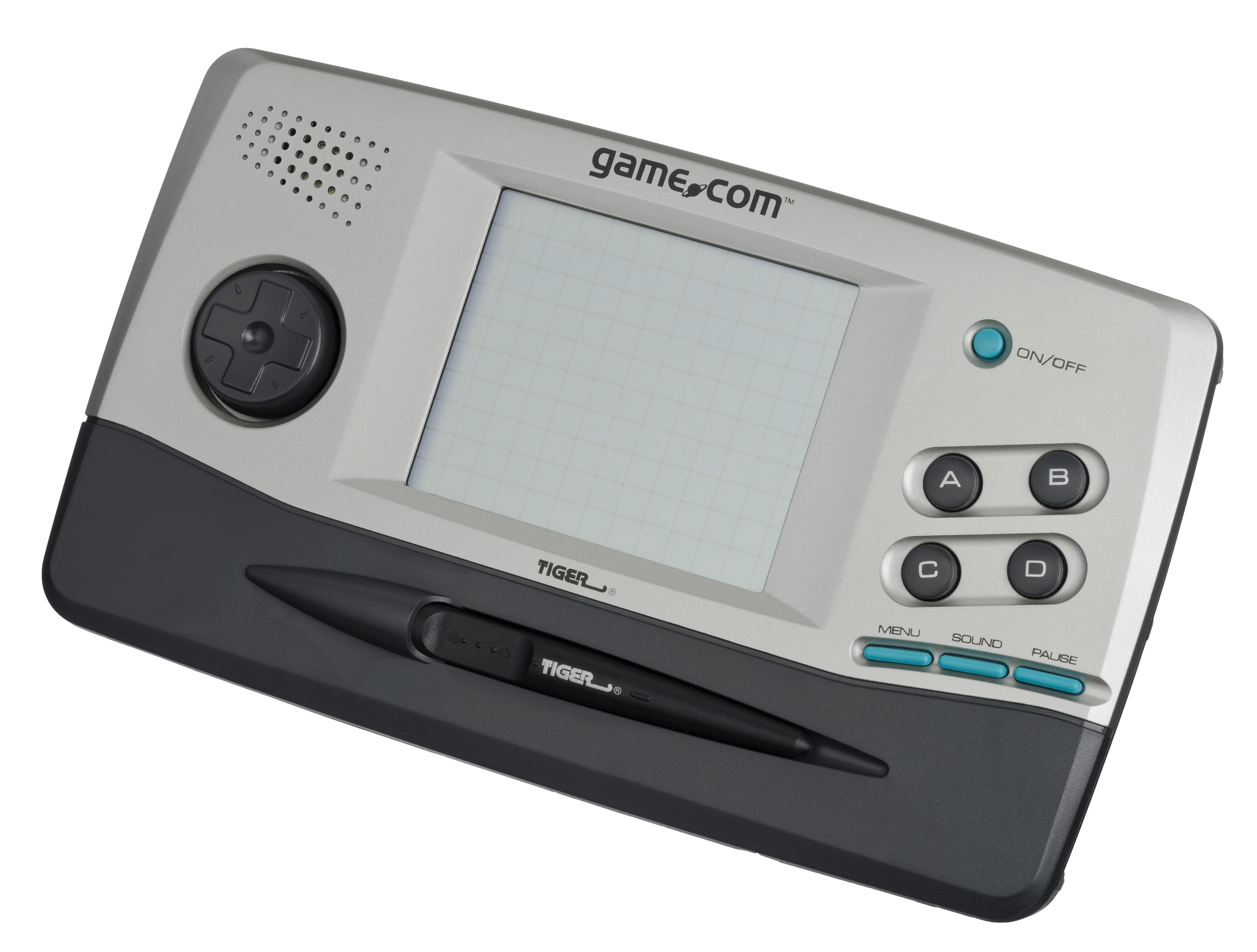
Game.com (1997)

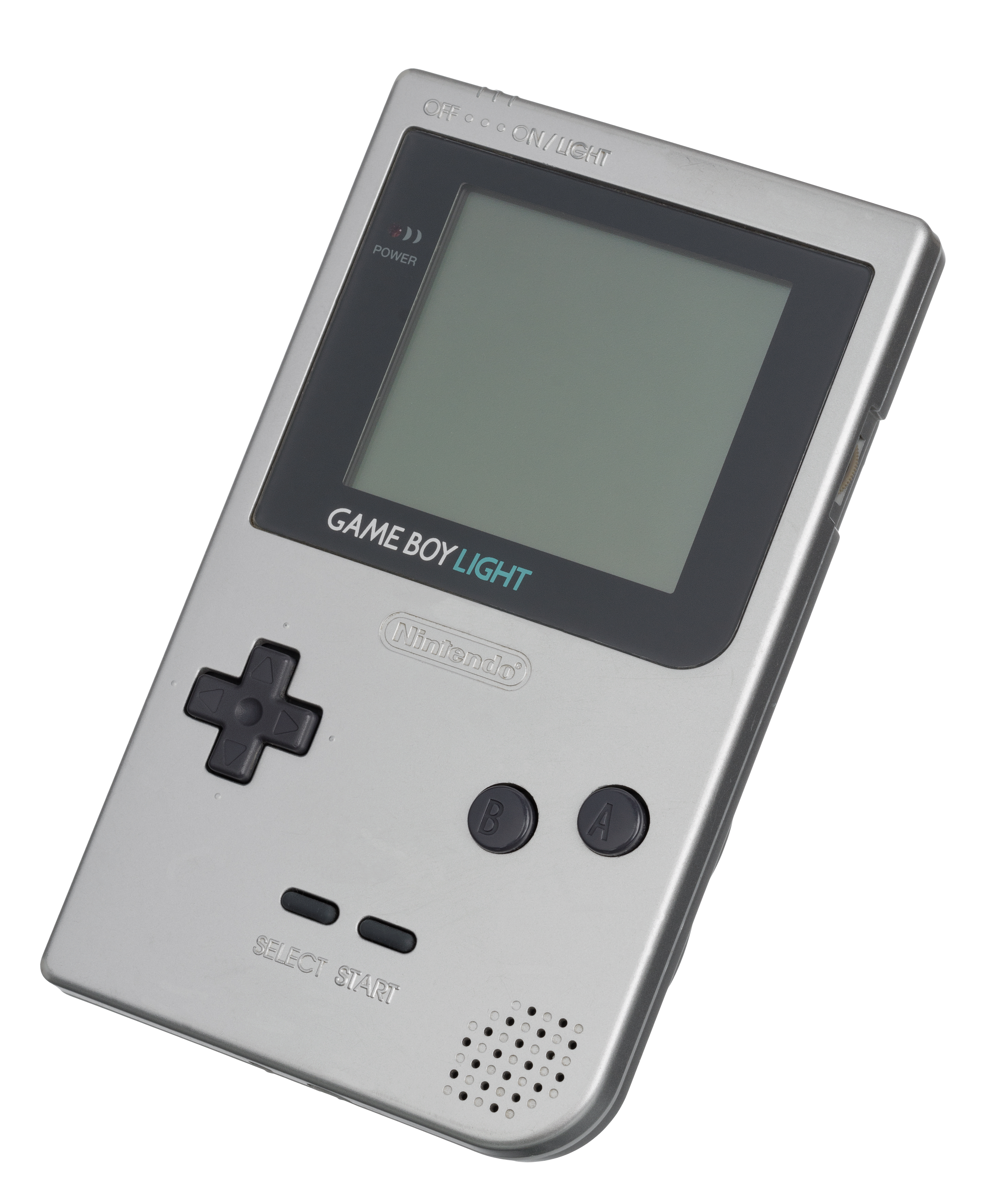
Game Boy Light (1998)

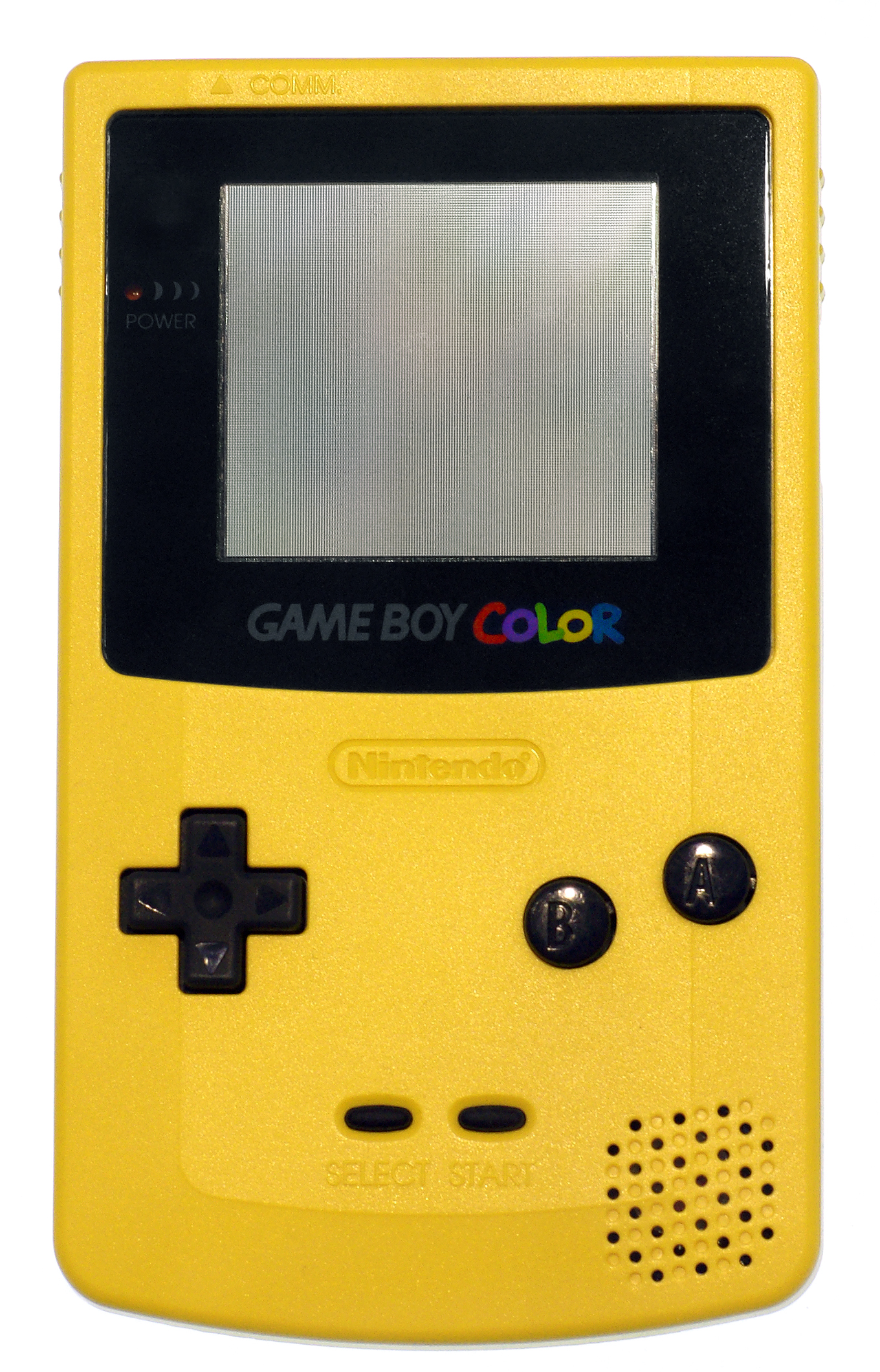
Game Boy Color (1998)

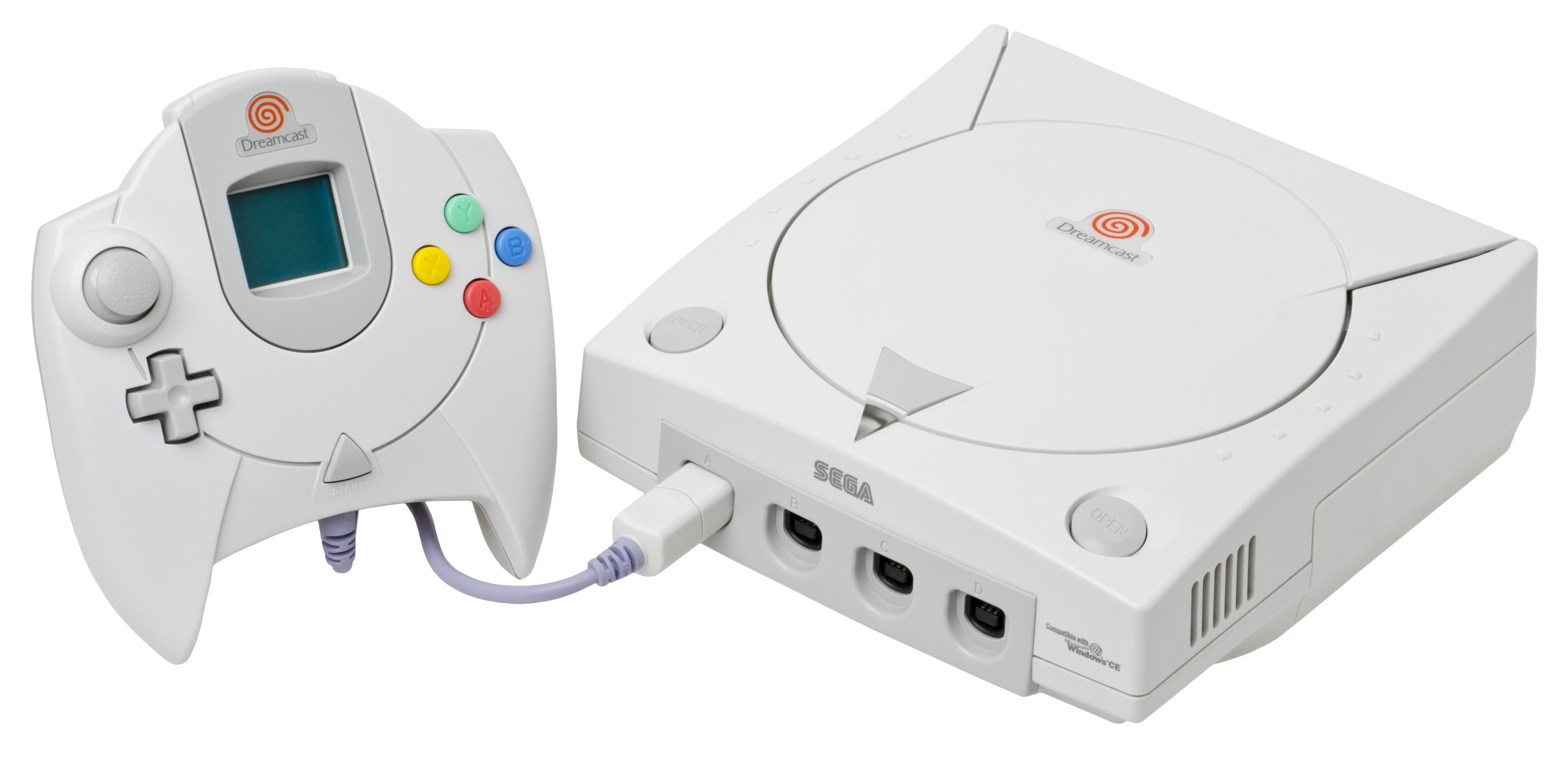
Dreamcast (1998)

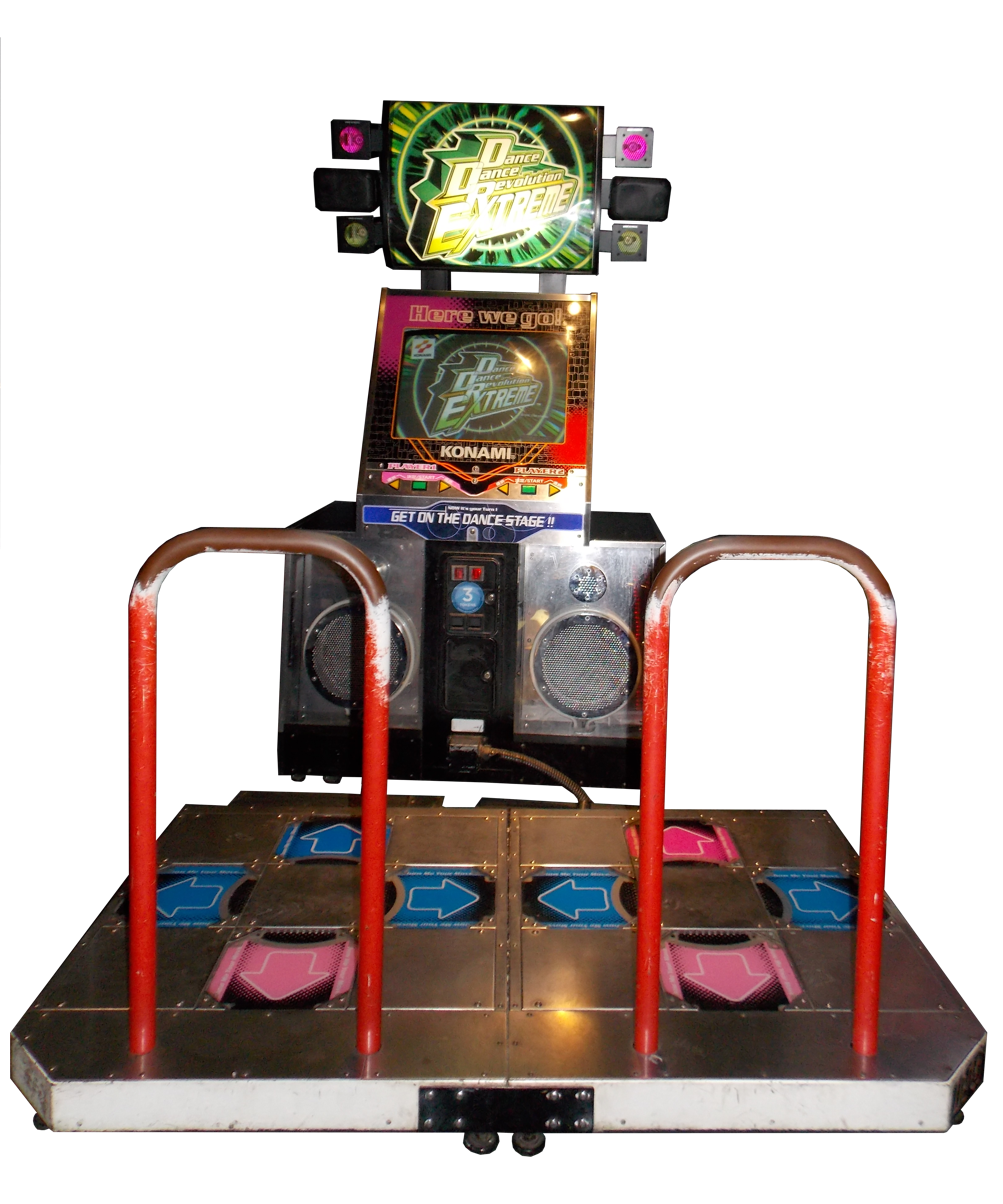
Dance Dance Revolution (1998)

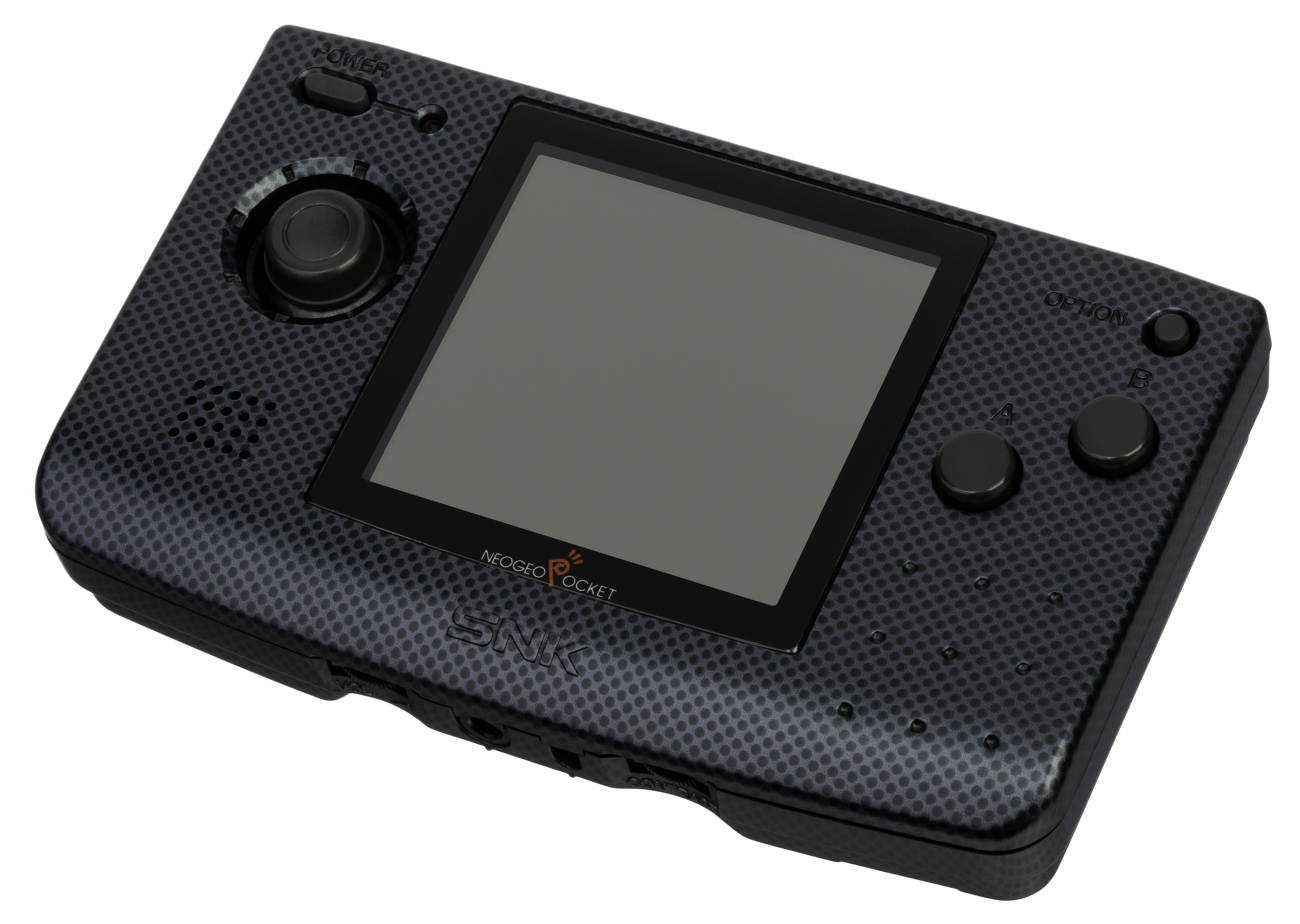
Neo Geo Pocket (1999)

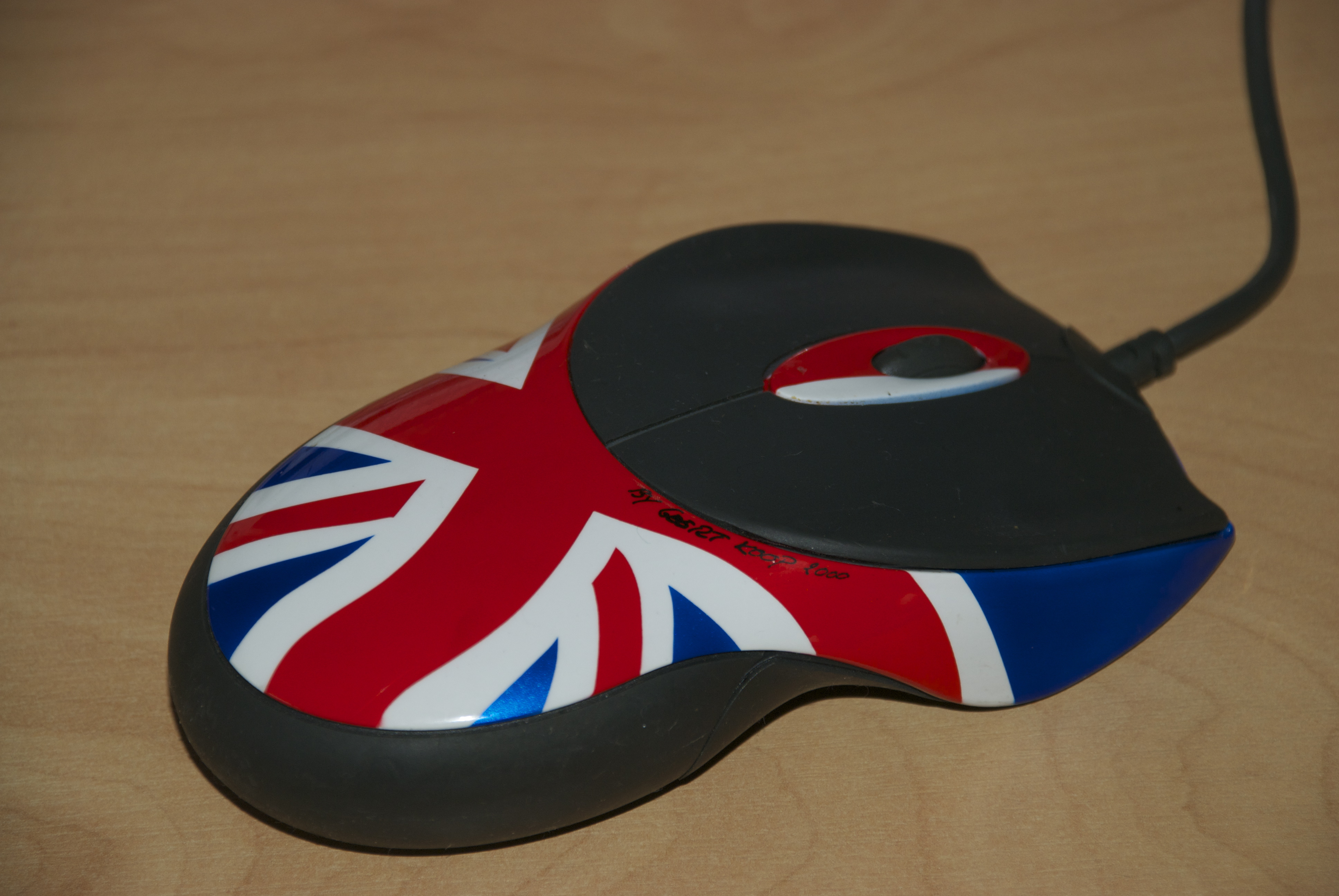
Razer Boomslang (first gaming mouse, 1999)
