= RocketWerkz =

New Zealand-based independent video game development studio

- Type: Private
- Industry: Video games
- Founded: December 2014; 11 years ago
- Founder: Dean Hall
- Headquarters: Auckland, New Zealand
- Number of locations: 2 (Dunedin and Auckland)
- Key people: Dean Hall (CEO)
- Products: Out of Ammo, Stationeers, Icarus
- Owner: Dean Hall
- Website: rocketwerkz.com

RocketWerkz is a New Zealand-based independent video game development studio founded in December 2014 by game designer Dean Hall, best known for his work on DayZ. Established in Dunedin and headquartered in Auckland, RocketWerkz specializes in survival and simulation games.

== History ==
After departing from Bohemia Interactive in early 2014, Dean Hall returned to his native New Zealand with the aim of fostering the local game development scene. In December 2014, he established RocketWerkz in Dunedin. The name "RocketWerkz" is derived from Hall's nickname "Rocket," which he earned during his time in the New Zealand Army.

The studio initially focused on experimental projects and exploring new technologies, including virtual reality (VR). In September 2015, RocketWerkz announced a partnership with Chinese technology conglomerate Tencent, which acquired a minority stake in the company. This investment allowed RocketWerkz to expand its development capabilities and workforce.

In 2019, the company expanded by opening a second studio in Auckland aimed to facilitate the development of larger-scale projects, such as the ambitious survival game Icarus. The Auckland studio attracted industry veterans and international talent, contributing to the growth of New Zealand's game development industry.

== Games developed ==
=== Out of Ammo (2016) ===
Out of Ammo is a virtual reality strategy game that combines first-person shooter and real-time strategy elements. Released for the HTC Vive in September 2016, the game allows players to build defenses and command units to repel waves of enemies. It was one of the early VR titles that showcased innovative gameplay mechanics.

=== Out of Ammo: Death Drive (2017) ===
A sequel to the original game, Out of Ammo: Death Drive is a VR action title set in a post-apocalyptic world. Released in August 2017, it expanded on the mechanics of its predecessor by introducing new environments, enemies, and weapons, offering a more intense and chaotic experience.

=== Stationeers ===
Released on Steam Early Access in December 2017, Stationeers is a space station simulation game inspired by Space Station 13. The game emphasizes complex systems and engineering, allowing players to construct and manage space stations with detailed physics, atmospheric mechanics, and intricate resource management.

=== Icarus ===
Icarus is a session-based player-versus-environment survival game released on December 3, 2021. Set on a terraformed but hostile alien planet, players undertake timed missions called "prospects" to gather resources, craft equipment, and survive against environmental hazards and wildlife. A key mechanic involves returning to an orbital station before the mission timer expires; failure to do so results in the loss of the character and progress. Icarus received mixed reviews, praised for its visuals and survival mechanics but criticized for technical issues at launch.

=== Art of the Rail ===
Art of the Rail is an upcoming transport simulation game inspired by classic transport tycoon titles. Players can construct and manage extensive transport networks using roads, rails, tunnels, and bridges, aiming to build a profitable transport empire that influences the in-game economy. The game offers both single-player and multiplayer modes, supporting up to 16 players in cooperative or competitive settings. It features a detailed financial simulation, allowing players to analyze expenses and profits, and includes comprehensive modding support with built-in asset editing tools. As of February 2025, Art of the Rail is available for wishlisting on Steam, with its release date yet to be announced.

=== Torpedia ===
Torpedia is an upcoming submarine colony management game. The game has been described as "RimWorld ... and you're making a submarine," by Hall. Gameplay is expected to center around managing the crew of a submarine while deploying on missions. Resources gathered along the journey can be used to upgrade the submarine including its size, technology, and capabilities.

=== Kitten Space Agency ===
Kitten Space Agency (KSA) is a space flight simulation game in early access being developed as a spiritual successor to the Kerbal Space Program (KSP) franchise. The game's inception was largely influenced by the development freeze of Kerbal Space Program 2 following the sale of Private Division by Take-Two Interactive. Multiple KSA developers were previously notable KSP modders. The game is expected to offer seamless exploration of a fictional planetary system, highly customizable space vehicle creation, and multiplayer functionality. The game will also be designed to have extensive modding support, as part of being built on Ahwoo's open-source BRUTAL framework. The first pre-alpha build of the game was released to the public on 14 November 2025. KSA has earned over $230,000 in total contributions by October 2026.

== Operations ==
RocketWerkz operates two main studios:

- Dunedin Studio: Focuses on smaller, experimental projects and serves as the original hub of the company.
- Auckland Studio: Concentrates on larger, more ambitious titles like Icarus and houses a significant portion of the company's workforce.

The company has played a substantial role in developing the gaming industry in New Zealand, offering opportunities for local talent and attracting international professionals. RocketWerkz's growth aligns with Dean Hall's vision to establish New Zealand as a notable location for game development.

== See also ==
- Video gaming in New Zealand
