= Gravon: Real Virtuality =

1995 video game

- Developers: Suma; Bohemia Interactive (Windows port)
- Platforms: Atari Falcon030, Microsoft Windows
- Release: Atari Falcon030: 1995; Windows: 1 August 2013
- Genres: Action, flight simulation
- Mode: Single player

Gravon: Real Virtuality is a 1995 video game developed by Suma. The game originally was released for Atari Falcon and later ported to Microsoft Windows in 2013 and packed as a bonus game to Take On Mars. The famous game Operation Flashpoint: Cold War Crisis is considered to be a spiritual successor to Gravon.

== Gameplay ==
Player controls a Hovercraft. The blue line on the left is a health bar, while the yellow on right is an ammo bar. Also visible are multiple gauges on the dashboard displaying speed and engine thrust levels.

The player pilots a hovercraft and has to complete tasks in the missions. Possible tasks include finding something, destroying an enemy object, destroying enemy fighters, etc. Missions are set on a large terrain that is procedurally generated. The player can come across mountains, villages, forests, and other terrain features. The game environment also differs on different missions. The player has to fight enemies that try to prevent him from completing the task. Types of enemies include hovercraft, tanks, helicopters and defense towers.

== Plot ==
The game's setting is a planetoid belt. The belt is occupied by enemy NPC's. The player character is a hovercraft pilot who has just completed training and is sent to the belt to fight enemies and fulfill multiple missions. The player character gets promoted after every mission success.

When any mission is completed with the highest rank (Colonel) the outro is seen. The protagonist returns home in a pod with a parachute. He lands into Earth's ocean where a helicopter arrives to pick him up.

== Development ==
Gravon was created by brothers Marek and Ondřej Španěl. They founded their development studio Suma in 1985. They finished their second game Invaze z Aldebaranu in 1992 and started to be curious about the military genre. They decided to create a military simulator with a large assortment of vehicles. The result of this interest in military simulation was the game Gravon. They decided to make it for the Atari Falcon due to the fact that they didn't trust Windows yet. They released Gravon in 1995. Gravon was well received but was a financial failure, not selling many copies. Only 400 copies of Gravon were sold.

Suma then worked on multiple unfinished Projects like Rio Grande and Poseidon. Poseidon was meant to be a sequel to Gravon but only a technical demo was released. The Španěl brothers then changed the name of their studio from Suma to Bohemia Interactive and developed Operation Flashpoint: Cold War Crisis. Operation: Flashpoint was a spiritual successor to Gravon. During development and support of Operation: Flashpoint, Bohemia Interactive became the largest video game development studio in the Czech Republic. Bohemia Interactive later ported Gravon to Windows and packaged it as a bonus game with Take On Mars.

== Release ==
A version for Atari Jaguar was in development, but it was never released.

== Reception ==
The game was met with positive reviews in the Czech Republic. It garnered an 88% from Narsil and LeveL hailed it the best Czech video game so far. Reviewers praised the gameplay and technical processing.
