= TKOH =

TKOH may refer to:

- Take On Helicopters, a video game developed by Bohemia Interactive
- Tseung Kwan O Hospital, a hospital in Tseung Kwan O, Hong Kong
