= Alternativa =

Alternativa may refer to:

- Alternativa (video game)
- Alternativa (Kosovo political party), a liberal political party in Kosovo
- Alternativa (Italian political party), a populist political party in Italy
- Alternative (North Macedonia), an Albanian political party in North Macedonia
- Alternativa (bullfighting), a rite of passage ceremony that novitiate bullfighters undergo to become full-fledged professional bullfighters
