= Missing on Lost Island =

2000 video game

- Developer: Mayhem Studios
- Publishers: Bohemia Interactive; ARI Data; Gamepad
- Platform: Microsoft Windows
- Release: 2000
- Genre: Adventure
- Mode: Single-player

Missing on Lost Island (aka Ztracený ostrov (Czech), Verschollen Auf Lost Island (German)) is a 2000 Slovak adventure game developed by Mayhem Studios, and published by Bohemia Interactive.

== Development ==
The game was developed by Riki Computer Games, which later transformed into Mayhem Studios. The Czech voice overs were done by Jiří Lábus, who had previously lent his voice to Slovak adventure game Ve stínu havrana. The original intention of the title, according to Bonusweb.cz, was to make a serious adventure around the theme of pirates, unlike previous games like the comical The Secret of Monkey Island.

In 2002 when German publisher ARI Data declared bankruptcy, Gamepad acquired the distribution license for German territory.

== Plot ==
Tim and Diana are on a quest to return to their own time period and location.

== Gameplay ==
The title is a third-person point-and-click adventure game. Visually, it is reminiscent of the classic adventure games from the first half of the 1990s. The game is in a 256-color palette. The 2D game features handpainted backgrounds.

== Critical reception ==
Bonusweb.cz thought that while the game had some favourable features, it fell short of promising Czech adventures like Polda 3 and Fairy Tale About Father Frost, Ivan and Nastya. Four Fat Chicks favoured the game's low-key characters to the obnoxious style seen in games like Koala Lumpur: Journey to the Edge. Quandary thought the game was amusing with some delightful animations. Mr Bill's Adventure Land praised the impressive realistic movement in the game.
