= Ice Station Z =

2016 zombie survival video game

- Title art for Ice Station Z
- Developer: Wobbly Tooth
- Publisher: Wobbly Tooth
- Engine: Unreal Engine 4 (2021 versions)
- Platforms: Nintendo 3DS, Nintendo Switch, Windows, PlayStation 4
- Release: 3DS: NA: November 3, 2016; EU: November 3, 2016; JP: April 5, 2017; Switch: WW: November 18, 2021; Windows: WW: December 2, 2021; PS4: NA: February 18, 2022
- Genres: Survival, action-adventure
- Modes: Single-player, multiplayer

Ice Station Z is a 2016 open-world survival video game developed and published by Wobbly Tooth, a solo independent developer. Players try to survive for as long as possible on an Arctic island overrun by zombies, scavenging for food, weapons and shelter either alone or with other players online. The game was released for the Nintendo 3DS in North America and Europe on November 3, 2016, and in Japan on April 5, 2017. A rebuilt version made in Unreal Engine 4 was released for the Nintendo Switch in November 2021, for Windows in December 2021, and for the PlayStation 4 in February 2022.

The 3DS version received negative reviews from critics, who faulted its bugs, combat and presentation. In Japan, however, it ranked second on Nintendo's weekly 3DS download sales chart shortly after release, behind only a Monster Hunter title. IGN Japan attributed its commercial success to its low price, the lack of similar survival games on the 3DS, and the popularity of survival game videos among younger players.

== Gameplay ==
Ice Station Z is played from a third-person perspective. After a mysterious virus spreads across an Arctic island, the player is left alone and must survive for as many days as possible. The game has no tutorial and no story beyond this premise. Players search the island for food, drink, medical supplies, weapons, ammunition, clothing and fuel, and can find shelters and vehicles to help them survive. They can also fish and hunt animals. The player must monitor their health and hunger, and needs to sleep and warm up inside buildings to stay alive. Some actions, such as sleeping, are performed through short timing-based minigames. In the 3DS version, the touch screen displays a smartphone-style interface that holds the player's inventory, map and status screens.

The game supports single-player, local wireless multiplayer and online multiplayer. The 3DS version supports up to eight players online, with both voice and text chat. The Switch and PlayStation 4 versions support up to ten online players, while the Windows version uses player-hosted servers. There is no cross-platform play between the Switch and Windows versions. The later versions also sell optional cosmetic skin packs as downloadable content.

== Development ==
Ice Station Z was developed by Wobbly Tooth, a one-person studio. It was the developer's fourth game for the 3DS eShop, following Toy Stunt Bike, Battleminer and The Magic Hammer. The game was announced in October 2016 with a trailer on YouTube. Pre-release coverage compared it to DayZ and highlighted its online voice chat, which was unusual on the 3DS.

In 2021, Wobbly Tooth rebuilt the game in Unreal Engine 4 for newer platforms, with significantly improved graphics. The developer promoted the Switch version as being based on the best-selling Nintendo 3DS game in Japan.

== Release ==
The 3DS version was released on the Nintendo eShop in North America and Europe on November 3, 2016, priced at US$3.99 and £2.99. It was released in Japan on April 5, 2017, for ¥500.

The Switch version was released worldwide on November 18, 2021, including in Japan under the title アイス ステーションZ, priced at ¥600. The Windows version followed on Steam on December 2, 2021, and the PlayStation 4 version in February 2022.

== Reception ==
Reception

Review score
Publication	Score
Nintendo Life	3/10 (3DS)

=== Critical response ===
Lee Meyer of Nintendo Life gave the 3DS version a score of 3 out of 10. He criticized the lack of direction, the repetitive randomized environments, poor hit detection, clunky combat, bugs such as being able to walk through trees, and the primitive visuals and sparse sound. He gave the smartphone-style interface credit for attempting immersion, but reported that he could not find other players online. He concluded that the game felt like "a prototype or a proof of concept" rather than a finished product.

In a two-part feature for IGN Japan, Takuya Watanabe described the game as influenced by DayZ and was critical of its gameplay, graphics and bugs. He used the game's popularity despite these problems as a starting point to discuss the unusual nature of the 3DS market and the difficulty of evaluating games.

=== Sales ===
Following its Japanese release, Ice Station Z ranked second in 3DS download sales on the weekly chart Nintendo published on April 14, 2017, outsold only by a Monster Hunter game. Watanabe suggested several reasons for its success: its ¥500 price, the scarcity of comparable survival games on the 3DS, and the popularity of videos of games such as DayZ on YouTube and Niconico, which he believed had made the genre appealing to younger players who watched them. When the Switch version was announced in 2021, Game*Spark called the original an oddity that had nevertheless been popular on the 3DS.
