= Icarus (video game) =

2021 survival video game

- Developer: RocketWerkz
- Publishers: RocketWerkz; Yooreka Studio
- Engine: Unreal Engine 4
- Platform: Windows
- Release: 4 December 2021
- Genre: Survival game
- Mode: Multiplayer

Icarus is a session-based survival video game by developer RocketWerkz. Created by Dean Hall, it was released on 4 December 2021 for Windows on the Steam platform.

== Setting and plot ==
The game takes place on the fictional planet of Icarus, located roughly four light years from Earth. The planet was the site of an attempted terraforming procedure, however unforeseen complications arose from exotic materials present on Icarus. These exotic materials cause the terraforming process to fail and leave the planet uninhabitable to humans. The process does however make the planet home to a viable ecosystem composed of genetically modified flora and fauna. Players take on the role of an explorer sent to explore the planet, retrieve scientific samples, and eventually gather exotic materials for eventual sale on Earth, called a "Prospector".

== Gameplay ==
Icarus is a survival game for up to 8 co-op players or solo players. The gameplay is divided into three modes: Persistent open-world environments, "outposts" which are calmer, safer, and on smaller maps than open-world "prospects", or the original gamemode that consists of timed "Missions". Players accept contracts for missions on a space station orbiting the planet, and drop down to its terrain to attempt the objectives. Once a mission timer is complete, the drop-pod returns to the station. If the player fails to return in time, their character’s body is left on the surface and their progress is lost.

To survive while on the surface, players must gather oxygen, food, and water, while also finding temporary shelter from the hostile environment. Eventually the player will be able to construct increasingly advanced structures and tools. Players have the usual health and stamina bars, which can be depleted by taking damage or by performing tasks like sprinting, gathering, and fighting. Genetically modified wildlife on the planet is often hostile, and a variety of storms also pose dangers to the player and their structures. Players who do not seek shelter from storms suffer movement and stamina debuffs, and spending too much time in certain storms will deplete health. Weather events will also damage and occasionally set fire to player built structures.

Elements of the game world are persistent, such as the locations of caves and lakes; others are procedurally generated, including the mineral formations found in said caves. The scope of the playable map also varies between missions. Nothing the player does or builds persists on the surface between missions.

Initially, the player is supplied with nothing except an exposure suit, and they must harvest materials essential to survival. As they progress, their character can unlock talents that improve their abilities, and acquire crafting blueprints that enable more advanced tools, weapons, and materials. On subsequent missions they retain their talents and blueprints, but begin initial prospects with little in the way of material supplies.

The player may earn an in-game currency called Ren by completing missions or by selling exotic matter found on Icarus. At the Orbital Workshop, the player may spend Ren to research and craft additional tools, armor, weapons, and other equipment that players may bring into prospects.

== Development ==
Hall and his team at RocketWerkz began development of Icarus in their New Zealand studio in 2018, and announced Icarus on 13 June 2021 at the PC Gaming Show. In interviews, Hall suggested the survival genre he helped pioneer with DayZ still held his interest. He also indicated the survival games face limitations in how they challenge players and introduce new content and concepts.

Initially planned as a free-to-play game, RocketWerkz made the decision in June 2021 to release Icarus in chapters, with a fixed price for each installment.

== Console Edition ==
Console Edition announcement trailer

A console version of Icarus, titled Icarus: Console Edition, was released for PlayStation 5 and Xbox Series X/S on March 26, 2026. The game was adapted for consoles by Grip Studios, featuring a controller focused control format and interface adjustments. The console release includes the base game alongside the New Frontiers expansion, expanding the playable world and available missions. The port was delayed from its initially planned February 2026 release to allow for additional polishing. The console edition does not support cross play, meaning PC edition and Console edition players cannot join games together, nor can console players on Xbox Series X and Series S or PlayStation 5 join each other.
