= Arma 2 =

2009 video game

- European Union cover art
- Developer: Bohemia Interactive
- Publisher: Bohemia Interactive
- Director: Marek Španěl
- Designer: Ivan Buchta
- Programmer: Ondřej Španěl
- Composer: Ondřej Matějka
- Series: Arma
- Engine: Real Virtuality 3
- Platform: Microsoft Windows
- Release: 29 May 2009: GER: 29 May 2009; CZ: 17 June 2009; EU: 19 June 2009; NA: 7 July 2009; AU: 20 July 2009
- Genres: First-person shooter, tactical shooter
- Modes: Single-player, multiplayer

Arma 2 (Note: Stylized as ARMA 2, Arma II, ArmA 2, or ArmA II.) is a 2009 tactical shooter simulation video game developed and published by Bohemia Interactive for Microsoft Windows. It is the second main entry in the Arma series and the third installment in the series overall. The game is set in the fictional Eastern European country of Chernarus during a civil war between the Chernarussian government and communist revolutionaries, and follows escalating tensions when the United States Marine Corps is deployed to defeat the rebels.

Arma 2 was first released on 29 May 2009 in Germany, with further releases in Europe, North America, and other regions throughout June and July of that year. The game was positively received by critics who, like its predecessor Arma: Armed Assault, praised its realism and accuracy but criticized its difficulty and bugs. Arma 2 has sold 2.3 million copies as of February 2015. Arma 2 maintains a significant modding community and is well-known as the origin of DayZ, a survival game conversion that was later developed into its own standalone game in 2018 and contributed to the development of the battle royale game genre.

An expansion pack, Arma 2: Operation Arrowhead, was released in 2010. A free version of the game was released in June 2011 but was discontinued by 2014. The game's sequel, Arma 3, was released in 2013.

== Gameplay ==
Arma 2 is a tactical shooter focused primarily on infantry combat, but significant vehicular and aerial combat elements are present. The player is able to command AI squad members which adds a real-time strategy element to the game. This is further enhanced by the high command system, which allows the player to command multiple squads using the map. Arma 2 is set primarily in the fictional Eastern European state of Chernarus (meaning "Black Rus"). The Chernarussian landscape is based heavily on the Czech Republic; the home country of the developer.

Arma 2, plus all expansions, features eleven distinct armed factions, each with their own vehicles and weapons. Caught in the middle are the Chernarussian and Takistani civilians. The factions included in Arma 2 are: USMC, Armed Forces of the Russian Federation, Chernarussian Defense Forces (CDF), Chernarussian Movement of the Red Star (ChDKZ), National Party (NAPA), and the citizens of Chernarus.

Arma 2 features around 80 realistically represented weapons with many variants including assault rifles, machine guns, and missile launchers, with realistically simulated ballistics.

There are around 130 vehicle variants, and any vehicle that exists in-game can be controlled by the player, including civilian cars, tractors and bicycles. Similarly, all aircraft encountered in the game can be flown by the player, with limited fuel and realistic weapon loadouts.

Arma 2 includes a mission editor which makes it possible to create user-made single player missions or campaigns and multiplayer missions through use of the in-game wizard. More complex missions can be enhanced with scripting commands. The syntax and interface have both been kept largely consistent with the Arma series, meaning that missions are ported across games.

== Synopsis ==
=== Setting ===
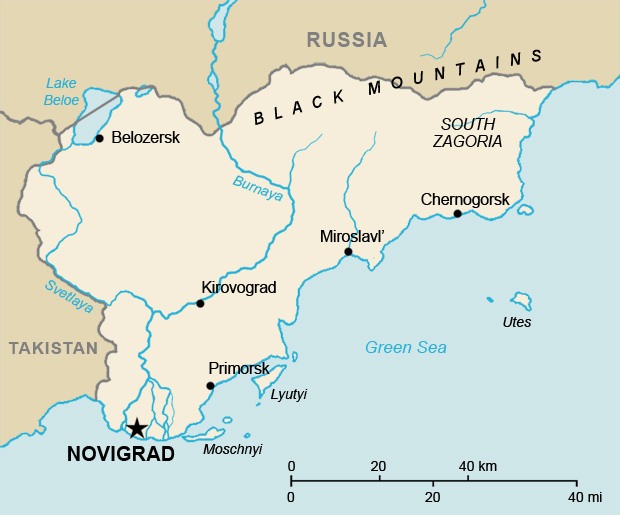
A map of the fictional country of Chernarus, showing the province of South Zagoria and the neighboring countries of Takistan and Russia

Arma 2's single-player campaign takes place in late 2009, in the province of South Zagoria in the north-eastern region of the fictional post-Soviet state of Chernarus, as well as the remote Chernarussian island of Útes. South Zagoria's approximately 225 square kilometers are based on actual satellite photos of České Středohoří, in northern Bohemia, Czech Republic. The precise location used is the remote area between Děčín and Ústí nad Labem.

Chernarus is in a state of political unrest, with its democratic government embroiled in a civil war against pro-communist rebels known as the ChDKZ (Chernarusskiy Dvizheniye Krasnoy Zvezdy, lit. Chernarussian Movement of the Red Star), led by communist revolutionary, Gregori Lopotev. After several months, the Chernarussian government asks the international community for assistance against the rebels, and the United States responds by sending a U.S. Navy Expeditionary Strike Group off the coast of Chernarus, hoping that a presence of an Amphibious Ready Group would calm any tensions in the area. However, the ChDKZ remains undeterred, and by late 2009 the ChDKZ launch a coup d'état against the Chernarussian government, taking control of the northeastern Chernarussian province of South Zagoria and forcing the remaining Chernarussian military forces in the area to retreat towards the inland town of Zelenogorsk.

Following this, the ChDKZ proceed to invade the island of Útes. Despite fierce resistance, the Chernarussian military forces on the island are eventually overwhelmed, and the island falls to the ChDKZ. In response, U.S. Marines launch an amphibious invasion of Útes to liberate the island from the ChDKZ forces, ultimately succeeding in pushing rebel forces out of the area.

A few days after the liberation of Útes, the Marines prepare to deploy to mainland Chernarus for Operation Harvest Red to bring an end to the civil war in Chernarus and re-establish Chernarussian sovereignty. Though the U.S. Marines are officially being deployed to Chernarus as a peacekeeping force, the true purpose of their deployment is to capture Lopotev and to end the rebellion.

=== Plot ===
==== Operation Harvest Red ====
In preparation for Operation Harvest Red, elements of the U.S. Marine Corps' Force Recon are deployed behind enemy lines into Chernarus to weaken ChDKZ coastal defenses for the invading Marine Expeditionary Unit. Among the Force Reconnaissance Marines is Razor Team, a five-man special operations team, which includes second-in-command Master Sergeant Matthew "Coops" Cooper, and team leader Master Sergeant Patrick "Eightball" Miles.

Razor Team is to conduct a raid on the small Chernarussian town of Pusta, to disrupt ChDKZ communications in preparation for the invading Marine Expeditionary Unit. During Razor Team's raid on Pusta, the team rescues torture victims, and subsequently uncovers a mass grave, revealing that the ChDKZ have been conducting acts of genocide and war crimes in South Zagoria. After the raid on Pusta, Razor Team is tasked with helping to unite the Chernarussian Defense Forces with National Party guerillas led by Prizrak.

As the civil war in Chernarus continues, a terrorist bombing occurs in the middle of Red Square, killing dozens and wounding several more. The ChDKZ blames the attack on the National Party, and Russia, unhappy about U.S. forces operating near its border, demands the unconditional withdrawal of U.S. forces from Chernarus. Russia also proposes to the United Nations Security Council that the United States withdraw its forces from Chernarus, whom the Russians allege are escalating the conflict. The United States' mandate in Chernarus expires, and U.S. forces quickly withdraw from the country. Shortly after the U.S. withdrawal, Russia sends a United Nations-backed peacekeeping contingent into South Zagoria to replace U.S. forces. However, Razor Team is left behind in the confusion as the remaining U.S. forces withdraw from Chernarus. Later, it is revealed that the terrorist bombing of Red Square was in fact a false flag attack committed by the ChDKZ to paint the National Party as terrorists. Razor Team is then tasked to acquire evidence which will prove the ChDKZ's involvement in the bombing of Red Square and the National Party's innocence.

The ending of the campaign depends upon a number of different factors: whether or not Razor Team eliminates Prizrak, who is opposing the alliance between the Chernarussian government and the National Party, and if Lopotev remains in custody. The campaign's endings range from Razor Team escaping safely, their elimination by the ChDKZ, or Russia's eventual nuclear strike against Chernarus.

== Development ==
Arma 2 was announced in 2007. It is named after the Latin word "arma", meaning weapons, soldiers, and war. Due to the fact that the previous game in the series was named Armed Assault, Arma 2 is often referred to as Armed Assault 2, albeit in error. Although Arma 2's title is stylized as ArmA II, it is done as an homage to the previous game in the series, because the game's title is a slight contraction of Armed Assault in the first game in the series.

During development, Bohemia Interactive stated at the Electronic Entertainment Expo that Arma 2 was to have a "roleplaying feel to it", with in-game events affecting the character as well as the entire campaign. For example, terrorizing non-playable characters would result in losing their trust, thus encouraging the victimized NPC(s) to give away valuable information to enemy forces. The entire campaign can be played either offline, as single-player, or online co-operative play for up to four players.

=== Technology ===
Arma 2 uses the third-generation Real Virtuality game engine, which had been in development for over 10 years prior to the game's release and of which previous versions are used in training simulators by militaries around the world. This engine has full DirectX 9 support (Shader Model 3). It features realistic day-night cycles, changing weather, fog and visibility, and a view distance of up to 15 kilometres. Every weapon in the game fires projectiles with real trajectories, bullet drop, and penetration characteristics. As such, no weapon system in the game is "guaranteed" a hit – only after the engine has simulated the event can it be determined if a given shot or missile has hit the target. The number of agents supported by the engine is limited mainly by computer performance. This allows a wide range of scenarios to be played, from small unit actions up to large-scale battles. Almost all events in the game are dynamically defined, including most unit speech and AI choices about how to evaluate and respond to specific situations in the game world: scenarios rarely unfold the same way twice – although a side with an overwhelming advantage will tend to win consistently. The player can choose to turn their head independently from their weapon / body, unlike in most shooters where the view is locked to the weapon. This allows players to look left and right while running forwards to maintain awareness of the battlefield or to look around while in a confined space without having to lower or shift their weapon.

Arma 2 provides a battlefield with all necessary data loaded in the background, with no interruptions by loading screens. However there are loading screens between episodes and missions. In order to augment player immersion in the gameplay, Arma 2 features an optional "ambient battle" feature in which the world around the player can automatically be populated by friendly and hostile units who will engage in combat.

=== Patches ===
Shortly after the game's German release a 1.01 patch appeared, with the objective of improving the game's AI. Another patch, v1.02, was released on 20 June 2009 fixing more AI graphical issues such as the AI walking through walls during cut scenes, driving vehicles with no hands, and unrealistic war reactions by the AI and other various singleplayer campaign problems. Then, another updated patch v1.02.58134 was released on 26 June. Patch v1.03 was released on 4 August albeit without an option for stand-alone server hosts. Patch 1.04 was released on 15 September. On 22 December 2009, patch 1.05 was released, which included a new mini-campaign, Eagle Wing, and a new vehicle, the AH-64 Apache. Patch v1.07 was debuted on 28 June 2010. Changes of note include improved performance within larger cities, enhanced AI driving skills, a raise of the file cache size to 4 GB RAM or more to take advantage of 64-bit operating systems, and improving the game engine's use of processors with 4 or more cores. Currently, the latest patch for Arma 2 is v1.11 (debuted on 22 December 2011, and sharing many features with Arma 2 Operation Arrowhead patch v1.60), which brought significant optimisations in multiplayer Netcode and performance, as well as numerous single-player campaign and missions fixes. On 19 August Marek Španěl from Bohemia Interactive announced that the latest beta patches are available to everyone from the official Arma 2 website. Current development of the beta versions has added, among other things, support for more efficient anti-aliasing modes like FXAA and SMAA in the ARMA 2: Operation Arrowhead engine.

=== Modding ===
Arma 2, like its predecessors, has an extensive support for modding the game. The developers have released a complete suite of tools to modify and create new content for Arma 2. The Real Virtuality engine includes a built-in scripting language to do tasks such as control AI characters, create triggers and waypoints, and add post-processing effects.

==== DayZ ====
In April 2012, Dean Hall released DayZ, an open world survival horror modification for Arma 2 which also required the Operation Arrowhead standalone expansion pack to work. DayZ received much critical acclaim in the video gaming media for its "innovative design elements", with Kotaku and Eurogamer describing it as possibly the best zombie game ever made, and PCGamer saying it was one of the most important things to happen to PC Gaming in 2012. The mod was responsible for putting the three-year-old game into the top seller charts for over seven weeks, spending much of this time the top selling game, and is responsible for over 300,000 unit sales within two months of its release.

== Release ==
Arma 2 was first released in Germany on 29 May 2009, followed by releases in the Czech Republic on 17 June, the United Kingdom on 19 June, North America on 7 July, and Australia on 20 July. The demo version of Arma 2 was released on Bohemia Interactive forums on 25 June 2009, and shortly thereafter on Steam. In the demo version, the player is given the possibility to play two single player missions as well as six of the eight training missions, with limited access to the mission editor. There is also access to a benchmark and limited online multiplayer.

Arma 2 uses different copy protections depending on publisher as well as a in-house coded copy protection solution against tampering known as DEGRADE. If the software detects that it was pirated, the DEGRADE-system degrades features of the game, rendering it unplayable. The version downloadable from Steam is not limited by number of installs, but other download services may utilize some limits. As of version 1.05 the publishers copy protection have been removed from Arma 2 although DEGRADE is still included.

=== Arma 2: Free ===
In June 2011 Bohemia Interactive released a free-to-play version of Arma 2, featuring full multiplayer compatibility with the retail version of Arma 2. However, the single-player campaign was omitted and players are not able to use high-resolution textures. In 2012, Steam removed ARMA 2: Free from its database. The service eventually was discontinued on 8 April 2014.

== Expansions ==
Name	Release date	Type	Source	Notes
Arma 2: Operation Arrowhead	29 June 2010	Standalone expansion pack	DVD; Download	
Arma 2: Combined Operations	29 June 2010	Standalone expansion pack	DVD; Download	Arma 2 + Arma 2: Operation Arrowhead
Arma 2: British Armed Forces	26 August 2010	Expansion pack	Download	Units of the British Armed Forces
Arma 2: Private Military Company	30 November 2010	Expansion pack	Download	Units of private military companies
Arma 2: Reinforcements	1 April 2011	Standalone expansion pack	DVD; Download	Addons British Armed Forces + Private Military Company
Arma 2: Army of the Czech Republic	1 August 2012	Expansion pack	Download	Units of the Army of the Czech Republic

=== Arma 2: Operation Arrowhead ===
On 22 April 2010, Bohemia Interactive confirmed that a standalone expansion pack for Arma 2, titled Arma 2: Operation Arrowhead, would be released worldwide on 29 June 2010. According to the site, players will be able to play as members of the United States Army in a fictional region of west-Asia named Takistan, where the terrain is based on Afghanistan. Operation Arrowhead includes three new maps, a variety of new units, vehicles and equipment, as well as the eponymous campaign. Among the new units are a new array of United States Army personnel and vehicles, Czech forces and German KSK units. United Nations peacekeepers are also present as an independent faction.

Bohemia Interactive has so far released two downloadable content packs for Operation Arrowhead. The first DLC, titled British Armed Forces, adds units from the British Army, and a new mini-campaign, where players assume the role of a company from the Parachute Regiment operating in Takistan. The second DLC, titled Private Military Company, includes a new campaign, environment, vehicles, and weapons. The third DLC, titled Army of the Czech Republic, added the titular Army of the Czech Republic, a new campaign, vehicles, and weapons.

== Reception ==
Reception

Aggregate score
Aggregator	Score
Metacritic	77% (38 reviews)

Review scores
Publication	Score
Eurogamer	8/10
GameSpot	8/10
PC Gamer (UK)	83%
PC Zone	70%

Arma 2 received generally positive reviews. The game has been praised for its realism, graphics, and the sheer scale of the game. However, as with the original Armed Assault, the game has received criticism for the number of bugs it contained on release and the quality of the AI. A reviewer at TheReticule.com ultimately felt that though at times it "doesn't work", the game is "a genuinely excellent game of the same pedigree of Operation Flashpoint and has done a lot of [sic] regain my faith in BIS". Another reviewer noted that the game managed to show the "job of a real soldier today: contact with the population", something that is lacking in other similar games The developers have since released several patches addressing common bugs.

In PC Gamer's leaderboard of top 100 greatest PC games of all time, Arma 2 received 22nd place. The game was also awarded by PC Gamer as Most PC Game of the Year for its complexity, community, technical perfection and miracle of simulation.

=== Combat footage hoaxes ===
On 26 September 2011, ITV broadcast a documentary Exposure: Gaddafi and the IRA, which contained a scene purporting to show Provisional Irish Republican Army fighters shooting down a British military helicopter in 1988; the footage was eventually revealed to be gameplay footage from Arma 2. ITV apologised, blaming human error.

On 26 February 2019, a video was circulated online claiming to depict an Indian Air Force airstrike on a Jaish-e-Mohammed camp. However, the clip was found to originate from Arma 2, being a demonstration of the in-game AH-64 Apache's FLIR gun camera.

Bohemia Interactive is aware of the use of Arma games in military hoaxes. Discussing the ITV documentary with PC Gamer in 2012, Bohemia CEO Marek Španěl stated that he was "surprised" that Arma gameplay could be confused for real footage so easily.

== Sequels ==
Arma 2: Firing Range is a standalone spin-off for mobile phones, released in 2011. It utilises augmented reality.

Arma 3, Arma 2's direct sequel, was released on 12 September 2013. Set in the same universe as Arma 2 in the 2030s (establishing Operation Eagle Wing as non-canon), Arma 3 follows a conflict between NATO and the Canton Protocol Strategic Alliance Treaty (CSAT) in the Aegean Sea nation of the Republic of Altis and Stratis. The game has seen several DLC expansions since, expanding the game's plot through different settings and stories.
