= DARWARS =

DARPA research program

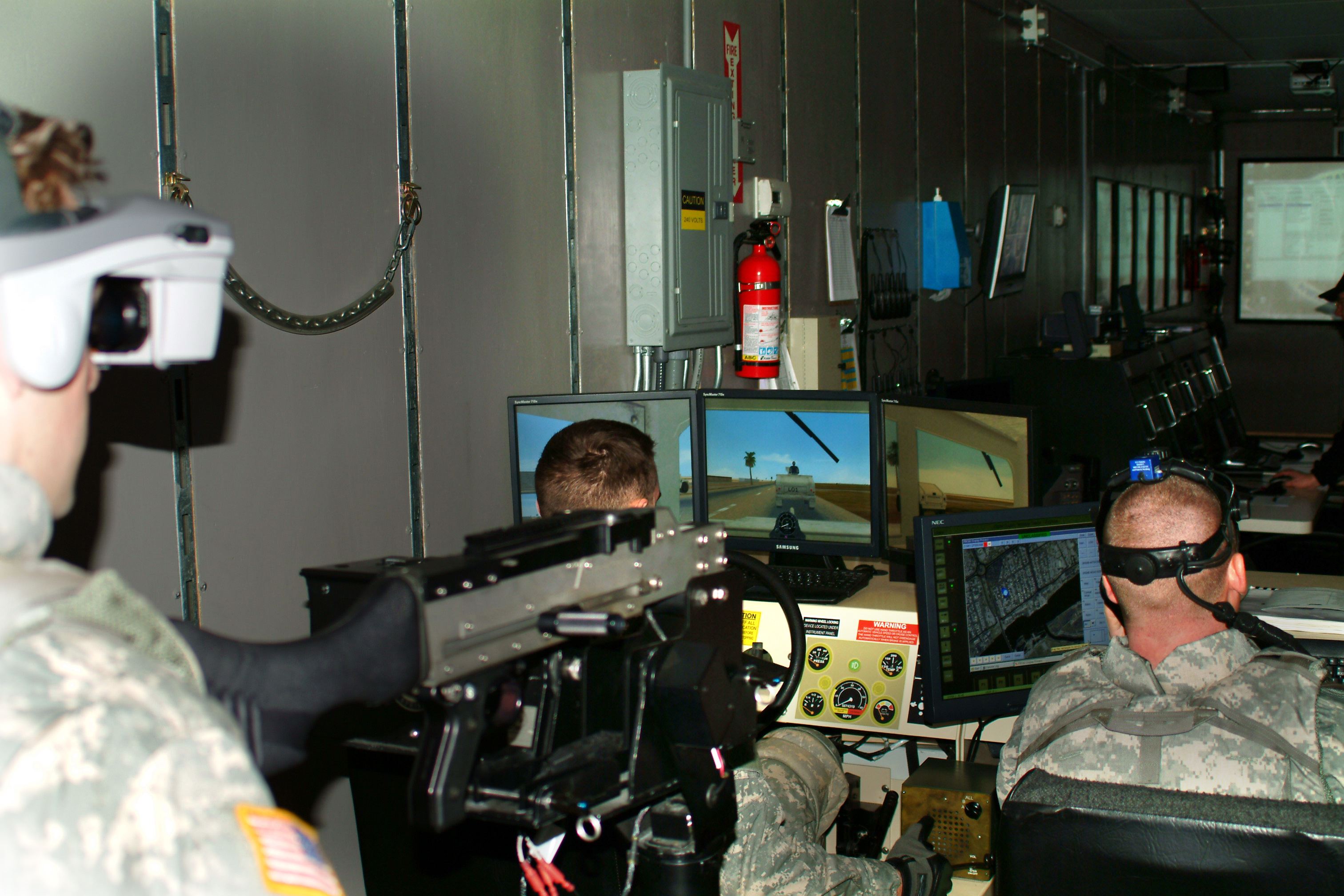
DARWARS Ambush

DARWARS was a research program at DARPA intended to accelerate the development and deployment of military training systems. These were envisioned as low-cost, mobile, web-centric, simulation-based, “lightweight” systems designed to take advantage of the ubiquitous presence of the PC and of new technology, including multi-player games, virtual worlds, off-the-shelf PC simulations, intelligent agents, and on-line communities. The project started in 2003 under the leadership of DARPA Program Manager Dr. Ralph Chatham, a former U.S. Navy officer. He was assisted by Jason Robar, a former USAF airman and Microsoft game technology evangelist.

The program was producing an architectural framework, including a set of web services, tools, and system interface definitions that facilitate the development of networked training systems. The scalable framework supports training for individuals, teams, or teams of teams (involving students at PCs interacting on a virtual battlefield). Training systems keep track of student performance in order to offer individual and group feedback. The program envisioned an online community of students, instructors and developers around the DARWARS family of training systems, although, realistically the creators only hoped to get this kind of training started - not see it to that complete end.

== Sponsorship ==
DARWARS was sponsored by the U.S. Defense Advanced Research Projects Agency (DARPA) and co-sponsored by U.S. Joint Forces Command (JFCOM) and the United States Marine Corps Program Manager for Training Systems (PM TRASYS). The integration and architecture contractor for the DARWARS project was BBN Technologies. The program was the core DARPA Training Superiority initiative.

== Exemplar trainers ==
As part of the DARWARS program, several training systems have been developed as exemplars of what is possible. Some of these systems have been deployed to meet training needs related to current U.S. military efforts. Among these is the DARWARS Ambush! tactical trainer and the language trainer Tactical IraqiTM.

=== DARWARS Ambush! ===
DARWARS Ambush! is a PC-based, networked, multiplayer training simulator, or, serious game. It provides military training based on experiences of personnel in the field, and includes capabilities to ensure the capture and dissemination of lessons learned. The initial application involved road-convoy-operations training, while subsequent applications include training for platoon level mounted infantry tactics, dismounted infantry operations, Rules-of-Engagement training, cross-cultural communications training, and other areas. The software was developed by Total Immersion Software, based on the technology and engine developed by Bohemia Interactive for Operation Flashpoint: Cold War Crisis.

DARWARS Ambush! is generally restricted to U.S. Military and U.S. Government organizations and personnel. The DARWARS Ambush! software is free of charge. The costs of the underlying game engine and networking infrastructure is nominal compared to traditional simulation-training systems. The most important innovation of DARWARS Ambush! is that it is user-authorable. Soldiers themselves can create new scenarios and training in a few hours or days without a contractor between them and their tactics, techniques and procedures.

=== Tactical Language & Culture Training System ===
Tactical Language & Culture Training Systems are PC-based courses that teach foreign languages and cultural knowledge needed to conduct tasks effectively and safely during both daily life and military missions. They are self-paced foreign-language training programs that use numerous research-based pedagogic and technologic innovations ( e.g. interactive 3D video game simulations) to teach language and cultural skills. The courses for Arabic, Pashto, and French are available to any member of the U.S. Armed Forces by free download from the company's website. A module to lean Dari (spoken in some region of Afghanistan) is in development.

== Replacement ==
Game After Ambush, which is based on VBS2 is scheduled to replace DARWARS Ambush! during 2009.

== See also ==
- Virtual battlefield
- Operation Flashpoint
