= DayZ (video game mod) =

Arma 2 mod

Arma II: DayZ Mod
- Developer: Bohemia Interactive
- Publisher: Bohemia Interactive
- Designer: Dean "Rocket" Hall
- Engine: Real Virtuality 3
- Platform: Microsoft Windows
- Release: WW: February 21, 2013
- Genres: Survival, First-person shooter, third-person shooter
- Mode: Multiplayer

DayZ is a multiplayer open world survival third-person shooter modification designed by Dean Hall for the 2009 tactical shooter video game Arma 2 and its 2010 expansion pack, Arma 2: Operation Arrowhead. The mod places the player in the fictional post-Soviet state of Chernarus, where a mysterious plague has infected most of the population, turning people into violent zombies. As a survivor with limited resources, the player must scavenge the world for supplies such as food, water, weapons and medicine, while killing or avoiding both zombies and other players, and sometimes non-playable characters, in an effort to survive the zombie apocalypse.

DayZ has been praised for its innovative design elements. The mod reached one million players in its first four months on August 6, 2012, with hundreds of thousands of people purchasing Arma 2 just to play it. In response to its popularity, Bohemia Interactive made a standalone game based on the mod. The mod itself remains in continued development by its community.

During the alpha, designer Dean Hall became part of Bohemia Interactive. The mod, renamed Arma II: DayZ Mod, was officially released on February 21, 2013.

== Gameplay ==
A player character wearing a ghillie suit lies in the prone position while pointing his M14 DMR across the water. The reticle in the HUD may be seen superimposed next to the bush which is to the right of the player.

DayZ attempts to portray a realistic scenario within the gameplay, with the environment having different effects on the player. A character may receive bone fractures from damage to their legs, go into shock from bullet wounds or infected bites, receive infections from infected or diseased players, or faint due to low blood pressure. Thirst and hunger must be kept under control by finding sustenance in either cities or the wilderness, with body temperature playing a key part in the character's survival. The game focuses on surviving and the human elements of a zombie apocalypse by forcing the player to acknowledge basic human needs like thirst, hunger and shelter. These mechanics require the player to focus on immediate goals before they can consider long-term strategies.

DayZ is praised for its level of emergent gameplay. BuzzFeed author Russell Brandom suggested that the mod has spawned the first photojournalist in a massively multiplayer online role-playing game, creating articles that are not only about a game world but journalism told from within it. Brandom claimed that DayZ is a unique example of the massively multiplayer online game genre in giving players the freedom to harm or murder each other, whilst adding no restrictions on how or why they may do it, quoting a player who described it as "the story of people". The mod has been compared by Kotaku to The Walking Dead and its focus on interactions between the characters when faced with desperate situations. The players in DayZ are forced to deal with dilemmas in similar ways as portrayed in both the comics and TV series for The Walking Dead.

It has been proposed that DayZ provides some insight into people's motivations and behaviors when reacting to real crisis events, mirroring controlled experiments of a similar nature. However, some critics of this theory argue that participants do not react as they would in a real world situation in which their life is truly threatened. Despite the game being biased towards self-interested, hostile competition, many players enter the game with their own perceptions and priorities. These varied approaches and experiences within the game suggest that even in a system that should theoretically promote rational behaviour, people act in unexpected ways. It has been proposed that this dispels the idea that chaos is an objective and defining feature of the system, rather it is what players make of it.

== Development ==
Dean Hall created the concept while he was a soldier in the New Zealand Army, as a suggestion for training soldiers through exposure to situations provoking emotion and relevant thought processes. He has stated he was inspired by experiences during jungle training while on exchange with the Singapore Armed Forces in Brunei, where he was badly injured in a survival skills exercise. Hall has stated that what he had endured then directly affected the development of DayZ, and the creation of immersion through forcing the player to experience emotion and tension as part of gameplay. Hall believed that early rapid success of the mod was largely due to social media and consumers' desire for games that provided significant challenge. Hall has described the mod as something of an "anti-game" as it broke what he felt were generally considered to be basic rules of game design such as balance and not frustrating users.

Originally requiring manual download and installation, DayZ mod has been released for free on Steam. On August 7, 2012, Dean Hall announced on the game's development blog that the mod was going to be made into its own game, with Bohemia Interactive as the developer, and himself as the project leader. On October 29, 2012, development of the mod officially transferred to a largely community driven effort with the release of version 1.7.3.

== Reception ==
DayZ acquired a large user base due to its unique gameplay. By August 2012, three months after release, the mod had registered more than one million unique users. IGN called it one of the most popular PC games in the world "right now" four months after release. It was credited for over 300,000 unit sales of Arma 2 within two months of the mod's release, putting this three-year-old title in the top seller charts on Steam for over seven weeks, much of this time as the top selling game.

Marek Španěl, CEO of Arma 2 developer Bohemia Interactive, said the mod was directly driving sales of the game and applauded it for an addictive and thrilling experience, saying that it could stand as a gaming experience on its own. The mod was also praised by video game developers not involved with the series. Kristoffer Touborg from CCP (EVE-Online) said it was the best game he has played in several months and called it particularly innovative given the first-person shooter genre, which he considered to be one of gaming's least innovative genres. Game designers Erik Wolpaw and Tim Schafer stated at PAX Prime 2012 that they believe that player-driven experiences such as DayZ are the future of gaming, commenting on what the title achieved without having a driving narrative.

=== Media reception ===
The mod received widespread media acclaim. Edge called DayZ the mod of the year. Wired UK's Quitin Smith said it could be the most terrifying game of 2012, and Rock Paper Shotgun's Jim Rossignol called it the best game he had played so far in 2012. PC Gamer stated the game was one of the most important things to happen to PC gaming in 2012 and included it in their 2012 list of the top five scariest PC games of all time. Metro called it one of the best games to ever to come out of PC modding and one of the single most impressive experiences available on the system. Eurogamer called it the best zombie game ever made and the break out phenomenon of PC gaming in 2012. Kotaku called it possibly the greatest zombie game of all time and the most interesting PC game of 2012. PC PowerPlay said DayZ was the most important thing to happen to PC gaming in 2012.

Eurogamer's Stace Harman suggested that the mod's designer Dean Hall might be responsible for some of the most emotive stories to come from playing a video game. Chris Pereiraa of 1UP.com called it a "shining example of PC gaming at its finest", stating the tension from interacting with other players leads to an experience unlike anything else he had experienced in gaming apart from making love in Heavy Rain, and cited the game as an example that PC gaming is not in decline, as the creation of such a mod is something that is only possible on a computer (as opposed to video game consoles). According to bit-tech's Joe Martin, no other game in the genre has offered so compelling take on a zombie apocalypse and its impact of the mod on the industry might be similar to that of Defense of the Ancients and Counter-Strike.

=== Awards ===
- The mod was nominated for the "Online Innovation" category at the Game Developers Conference Online Awards 2012.
- PC Gamer gave DayZ the "Mod of the Year" 2012 award, calling it "one of the least-forgiving and most intimidating games of the year."
- Good Game gave DayZ the "Quiet Achiever" award for 2012.
- PC PowerPlay gave DayZ the "Game of the Year 2012" and named it number five on their list of top 100 games of all time.

== Standalone game ==
The standalone title, also called DayZ, carries over many of the core gameplay mechanisms of the Arma 2 mod. DayZ has enhanced graphics, enhanced UI, and AI compared to the mod. DayZ launched on 8th generation consoles (PlayStation 4 and Xbox One) in 2019.
