= Space Station 13 =

2003 video game

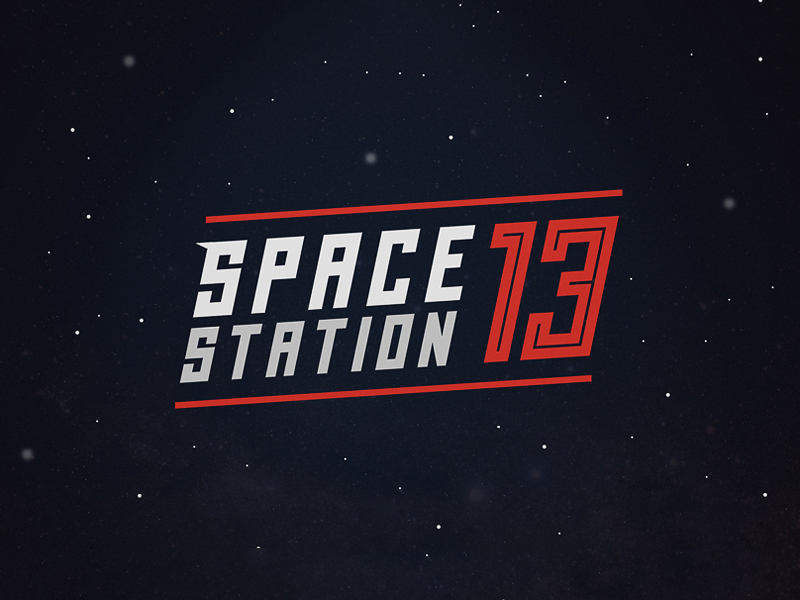
- Developers: Exadv1; Space Station 13
- Engine: BYOND
- Platform: Windows
- Release: 15 February 2003
- Genres: Role-playing, simulation
- Mode: Multiplayer

Space Station 13, often shortened to SS13, is a free-to-play role-playing multiplayer video game originally developed by Exadv1. It runs on the freeware BYOND game engine, originally released in 2003. Sessions in SS13 are round-based; players perform their assigned jobs from a top-down perspective aboard a futuristic space station, co-operating and responding to various player- and environmentally-created events in an attempt to belay a round-ending catastrophe.

Development of the base game is done under open collaboration, with some game servers forking and modifying this code under separate licenses. Space Station 13 has several maps, game modes, and round win conditions, which can range from simple survival to complex conspiracies and political intrigue, with many rounds often requiring some degree of social deduction.

== Development and history ==
Space Station 13 was originally created in 2003 by developer Exadv1 as an atmospheric simulation program before being expanded into a multiplayer game on the BYOND engine. In 2006, the original source code was released or leaked to the public, prompting player communities to create independent, competing development branches.

Because development transitioned into open-source community branches, several prominent codebases evolved with different design goals:

- Goonstation emerged as one of the earliest and most active branches, maintained by the Something Awful forums. It introduced many of the game's comedic elements, secret exploration maps, and custom chemical reaction systems.
- /tg/station originated from the 4chan /tg/ (traditional games) board after splitting from an open-source release of early Goonstation code. It focuses on modular, open-pull-request development, rapid balance passes, and standardized atmospheric and medical frameworks that were later adapted by other community servers.
- Baystation 12 and subsequent derivatives shifted the focus away from slapstick action toward structured, high-roleplay military and scientific simulation, with slower pacing and strictly enforced character protocols.

== Gameplay ==
Space Station 13's gameplay is based on the content, settings, and code applied on the game server. Due to the largely open-source nature of the game, sessions are typically hosted on user-maintained and customized game servers, which can alter or vary the gameplay experience. Sessions are played in rounds, where players can create a customized character, begin playing with a randomly generated one, or use a previously existing character. Players can choose different jobs, such as janitor, engineer, or clown, which dictate their roles and responsibilities. Sessions are usually isolated from each other, so players can choose to change their job, character, or playstyle in between rounds.

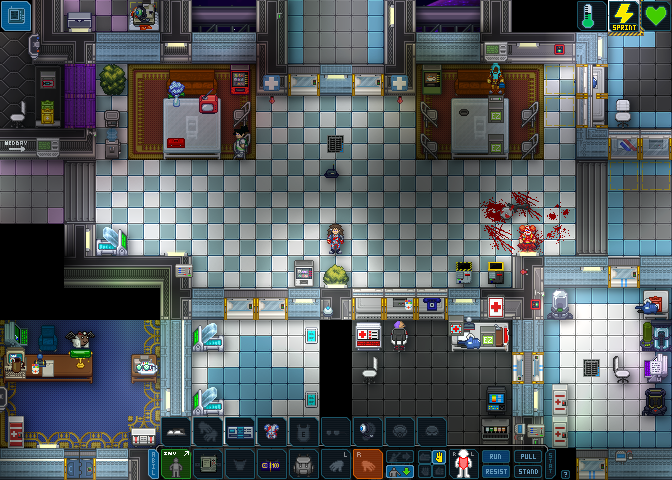
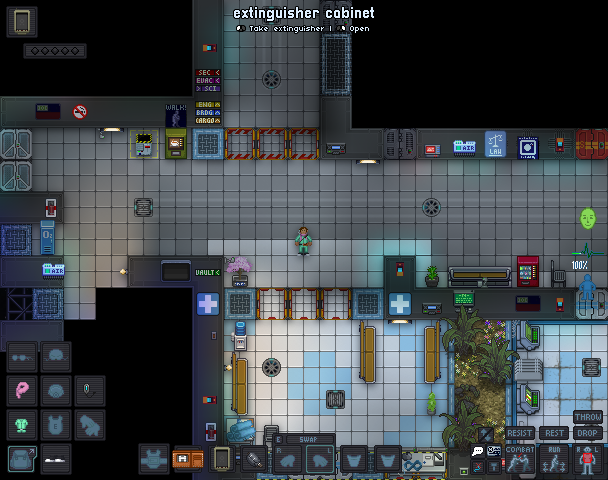
Screenshots depicting the user interfaces of Goonstation (left) and /tg/station 13 (right), both forks of a source release of Goonstation in 2010; a more extreme example of diversity between servers.

The player can interact with nearly any object or being in the game world in a context-sensitive fashion. Different results will occur depending on many variables in any given interaction (e.g., using a crowbar on another player would attack them, but using it on a floorboard would pry it up). Additionally, depending on the server, the player can change their character's 'intent' between four different states (Help, Disarm, Grab, Harm), which will further influence actions taken. For example, using the player's hands on a fallen character with help intent would help them up from the ground, while using harm intent could punch or kick them. Additionally, some servers use a "combat mode" system that assigns these intents to the left and right mouse buttons, with a single key to alternate between two modes that have different effects. Some servers also entirely lack the intent/combat mode system. Controls can differ greatly between servers, but WASD/arrow key-based movement and a "hand" system are fairly consistent.

The game simulates atmospheric mechanics, power grids, chemistry, and biology in real time rather than relying on scripted events. It originally began as an atmospheric simulation program, and the engine still tracks gas mixes, room pressure, pipe loops, heat transfer, and explosive decompression. These atmospheric factors tie into an overall electrical grid that routes power from engines, such as black holes or volatile crystals, through wiring and local area controllers to individual equipment. Most server codebases also track individual character organs, blood volume, toxins, and internal injuries alongside a chemical mixing system where reagents react and combust based on temperature and ratios.

While different servers may have their unique station constructs, generally, there are eight departments aboard the station. Supply and Service are also often grouped in the Civilian category.

- Command (taking leadership roles aboard the station)

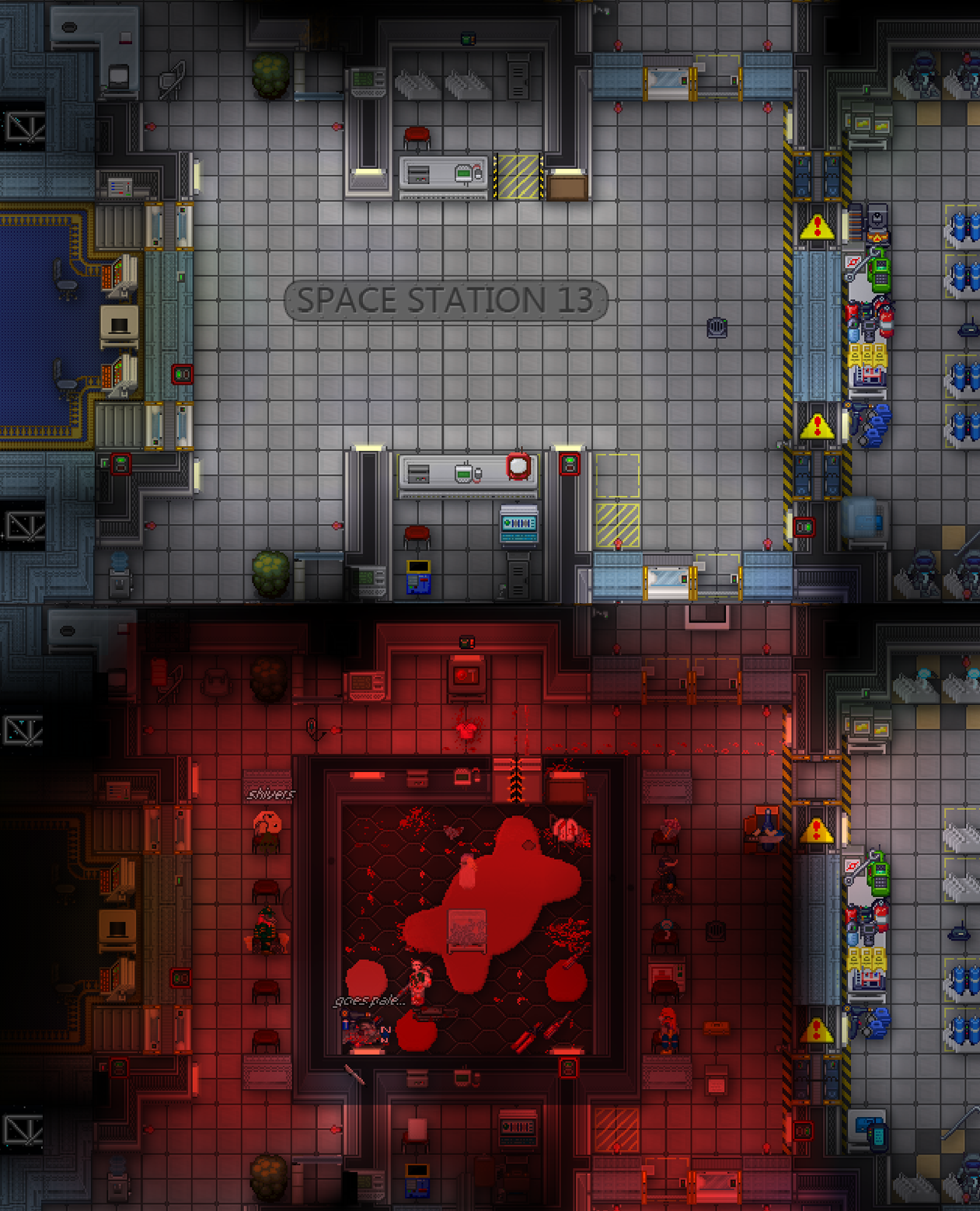
Example of extensive player-made modification to one of the stations in the game.

- Security (enforcing the law, keeping peace, and responding to emergencies aboard the station).
- Engineering (generating power and keeping utilities maintained aboard the station, such as keeping doors functional, supplying internal atmospherics, and repairing damage).
- Science (researching technologies and genetic mutations, breeding slimes, and developing 'Synthetics' aboard the station).
- Medical (keeping the crew healthy, performing most surgeries, researching diseases, cloning deceased players aboard the station).
- Supply (mining for minerals on a nearby planet and taking charge of requisitions, such as purchasing goods for departments & crew members as well as sorting through disposed items).
- Service (keeping the station clean and providing crew food, drinks, and entertainment.).
- Synthetics/Silicons (consisting of the station's AI and cyborgs, who are often bound by the Three Laws of Robotics, which restrict AI from committing illegal acts, such as assaulting a crew member, unless someone changes said laws).

Optimally, all players spawn at the beginning of each round and perform their jobs, not accounting for human error and malicious intent. However, randomly selected players are chosen to spawn as antagonists aboard the station. Antagonists can range from mostly normal characters with certain malicious intentions, rogue artificial intelligence, and a wide assortment of monsters and enemies, such as Changelings, Xenomorphs, creatures of Lovecraftian horror, assassins, and death squads armed with nuclear weapons. It can be difficult for normal crew members to identify antagonists and even harder to determine their objectives.

Due to the presence of antagonists (and, sometimes, due to players failing at their assigned jobs), many rounds escalate into chaos and disorder. While communities can have pre-set match timings, rounds are often concluded when the situation becomes critical and evacuation procedures are initiated.

There are several different servers to play on, each sporting its own set of rules and gameplay elements. Examples include Goonstation, originally created by users of Something Awful (who are collectively referred to as "goons"), CM-SS13 (with CM standing for Colonial Marines), a server inspired by the Alien franchise, /tg/station 13, originally created by members of 4chan's /tg/ or "traditional games" board and Paradise Station, a popular generalist server with a large Russian offshoot.

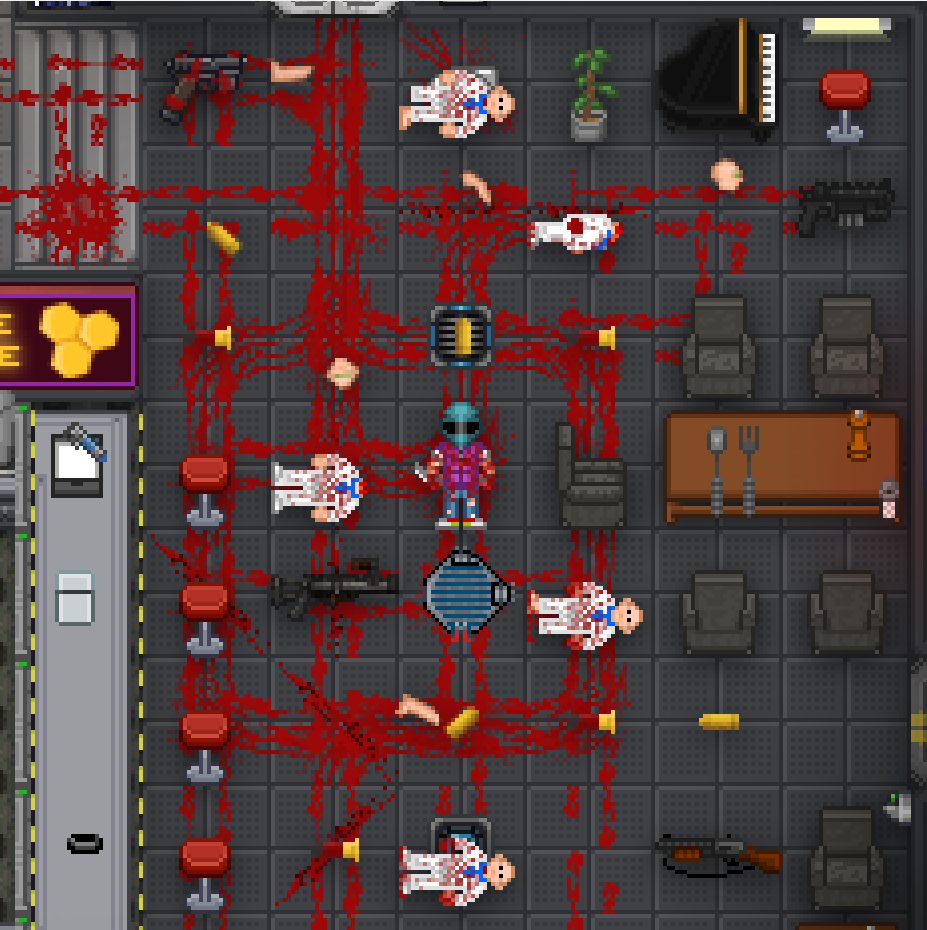
An example of the chaos caused by antagonists in a round.

== Plot ==
Due to each server's lack of an agreed canonical storyline, most, if not all, servers have individualized lores. Generally, Space Station 13 takes place several centuries in the future on a research station owned by the megacorporation known as Nanotrasen. The station exists to research the mineral 'plasma' (also referred to as 'phoron'), which is very valuable, possibly due to its extreme flammability. Nanotrasen's influence and power have effectively made them a government entity, but it is often left ambiguous as to whether they are good, evil, or a neutral party (depending on the server).

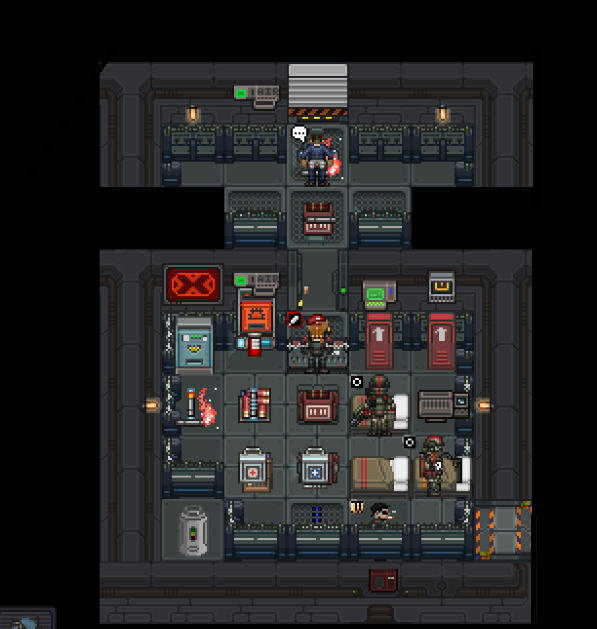
Marines hunker down a final line of defense against the Xenos.

Due to Nanotrasen's immense stature and massive monopoly on plasma, it is targeted by an array of third-party aggressors. This includes but is not limited to, the Syndicate (a coalition of smaller companies and planetary governments), the Space Wizard Federation (a federal group of thaumaturgical aggressors), and Changelings (an extraterrestrial species with the ability to take on the form of any organic life-form they've absorbed, similar to The Thing from the novella Who Goes There?).

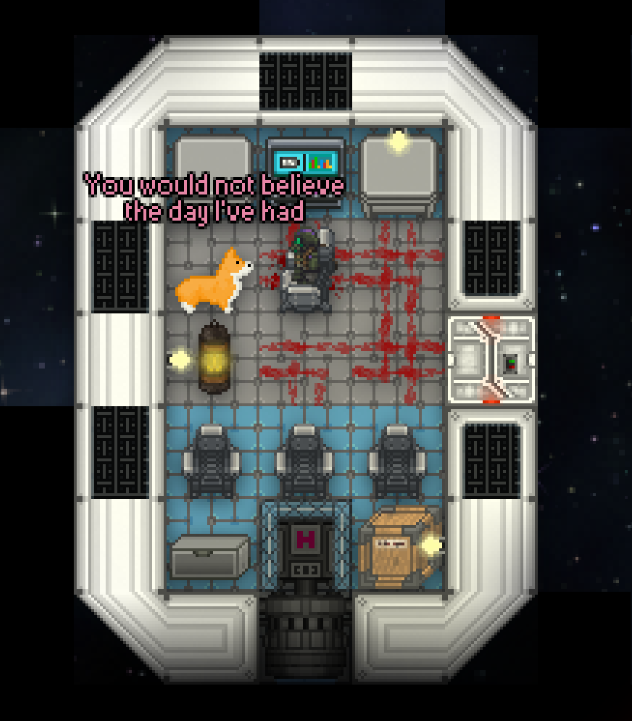
As a sandbox, the game's plot is 100% player-driven every round.

== Development ==
Space Station 13 was originally developed as an atmospherics simulator by Exadv1 in 2003. Its closed source codebase was decompiled in 2007, giving rise to SS13's current popularity.

== Reception ==
Space Station 13 garnered attention from various video game journalism websites over the years.

The game served as a direct inspiration for the role-playing video game Barotrauma, and was also mentioned by Eurogamer as an inspiration for the now-cancelled game ION by DayZ creator Dean "Rocket" Hall. He then later released Stationeers, which was also inspired by Space Station 13.

Rock, Paper, Shotgun named Space Station 13 on its list of "Best free PC games" in 2016 and 2019.

== Community Remake ==
Space Station 14
- Developer: Space Wizards Federation
- Publisher: Space Wizards Federation
- Engine: Robust Toolbox
- Platforms: Windows, macOS, Linux
- Genres: Role-playing, simulation
- Mode: Multiplayer

A large number of promising community efforts to remake SS13 have been started over the years due to longstanding frustration with SS13's closed-source engine BYOND and low quality of code. Most of these attempts have since been abandoned, and a community mythos has jokingly built up around "The Curse," a supposed force that is responsible for the failure of all attempts to remake the game.

Regardless, multiple major SS13 remakes are currently in development: Space Station 14, Unitystation, and RE:SS3D. Of these, Space Station 14, commonly abbreviated as SS14, is currently the most popular. SS14 is developed by Space Wizards Federation, a community of volunteers.

The project originated in an attempt to remake SS13 around 2011. Its source code was released in 2015, allowing other volunteers to continue development under the name Space Station 14. It uses Robust Toolbox, a custom engine written in C#, and supports community-operated servers with modified content. The game supports Windows, macOS and Linux. As of September 2026, it is accessible through Steam Playtest, while its main Steam release remains listed as forthcoming.

=== Gameplay ===
SS14 gameplay mirrors that of SS13. The game is organised into rounds representing shifts aboard a space station. Players control custom characters assigned occupations with different equipment and responsibilities. Accidents, deliberate sabotage and external disasters can disrupt these activities and create emergencies.

Gameplay relies on the competing goals, interests, and objectives of players interacting in unique ways as situations unfurl aboard the station. The game's description presents these competing responses as sources of the round's developing story. Writing in PC Gamer, Shaun Prescott described the game as combining player-versus-player and player-versus-environment activity within a shared role-playing setting.

==== Simulation and design ====
The development staff's core design document identifies interacting simulation systems, a changeable environment and player agency as central principles. Station areas can be damaged or reconstructed, and systems are intended to interact in ways that produce unplanned situations. The document also calls for mechanics that encourage contact between players and communicate enough information for them to make decisions within the game.

The stated artistic direction combines dark comedy with surreal humour. Dangerous events coexist with absurd situations, while the setting is intended to retain sufficient consistency for role-playing. These principles describe the principal project's design goals; the documentation recognises that other server communities may take the game in different directions.

==== Community servers ====
Community operators can modify the game's rules, mechanics, setting, or even its artistic direction or gameplay focus. Players can therefore encounter highly different experiences on different servers, rather than a single uniform version of the game.

Some servers are be tweaked versions of the official Wizard's Den servers, featuring a largely similar gameplay loop with a focus on adjusting the rules or content featured. Some focus largely on combat, such as Rouny's Marine Corps 14, the sequel of its SS13 equivalent, Colonial Marines 13. Some completely do away with custom characters in order to lean more into the game's social deduction aspects, such as Ephemeral Space. Many other communities may do things in a similar way, or entirely different. In its 2020 coverage, GamingOnLinux highlighted this extensibility and the ability of server operators to customise the game for their communities.

=== Development ===
==== Origins and continuation ====
Space Station 14 developed from efforts to recreate Space Station 13 outside its original BYOND platform. According to the project's official history, developers associated with Goonstation began a remake around 2011. Initially also named Space Station 13, the project was developed privately, with occasional public progress reports. Development slowed as its contributors became occupied with other commitments.

The developers released the source code in January 2015 so that other members of the community could continue the project. The continuation adopted the name Space Station 14, and volunteers organised through an IRC channel. Work remained uneven because major components, including the rendering system, required replacement. The official history dates a renewed period of development to May 2017, when additional contributors joined, a new website and Discord community were established, and further engine revisions followed.

In May 2020, GamingOnLinux reported that the project had a Steam store page and planned a free release. The publication compared it with Unitystation, another SS13 remake, noting that Space Station 14 did not require contributors to use the proprietary Unity engine.

==== Public testing ====
The developers announced Steam Playtest availability in February 2021. They explained that they had considered an Early Access release but judged a more limited testing programme better suited to the game's condition. Players were initially admitted in batches, and a standalone download remained available outside Steam. No date was set for a wider Early Access release.

The same report documented the introduction of a framework for antagonist objectives and a basic traitor mode. Its initial objectives included theft, assassination and survival. At the end of a round, the game revealed the traitors and reported whether their objectives had been completed.

In January 2025, the project lead at the time, PJB3005, published a retrospective marking ten years since the precursor's source code was released and the Space Station 14 continuation began. She described the waxing and waning of the project's development effort over the years and expressed her gratitude to the game's community. She also identified the growth of the player and contributor base as an ongoing organisational challenge, but despite this, she wrote "I think it’s fairly safe to say that we’ve broken the curse at this point."

=== Technology ===
SS14 runs on Robust Toolbox, a custom C# engine. Its architecture separates the engine from a server's game content. The client and server load a content package containing the material required for that particular version of the game. The project's documentation explains that this arrangement allows communities to develop their own content without maintaining separate modifications of the engine.

The main content repository's code is released under the MIT licence. Artwork and other assets have separate licensing arrangements. Most use Creative Commons Attribution-ShareAlike 3.0, with exceptions recorded in asset metadata; some assets have non-commercial licences. The source-code licence therefore does not apply uniformly to every component distributed with the game.

=== Distribution ===
The project offers a standalone download alongside its Steam Playtest distribution. As of September 2026, the Steam page advertises automatic acceptance of playtest requests, while continuing to list the main release as forthcoming. Space Wizards Federation states that the game will remain free after leaving Early Access.

=== Reception ===
In June 2024, PC Gamer's Shaun Prescott characterised Space Station 14 as a modernisation and engine replacement for Space Station 13. He highlighted its variety of roles and suggested that Steam distribution could introduce the experience to a larger audience.

Writing for Esports.net in August 2024, Michael Hassall identified the game as his personal highlight of the PC Gaming Show. He welcomed its potential to make the experience associated with Space Station 13 more accessible. His enthusiasm drew substantially on his experiences of the earlier game.

In September 2026, Mathias Marques of the Portuguese publication PróximoNível emphasised the role of player creativity and interaction. Drawing on his own sessions, he described both routine occupational tasks and unexpected encounters, arguing that memorable events arose from players' use of the game's systems. He preferred the convenience of accessing Space Station 14 through Steam, while noting that it and Space Station 13 offered different content.

== See also ==
- List of open source games
- Space Station 14 official website
- Space Station 14 Github
