= Arma 2: Operation Arrowhead =

- European Union cover art
- Developer: Bohemia Interactive Studio
- Publishers: EU: 505 Games; NA: Meridian4
- Series: Arma
- Engine: Real Virtuality 3
- Platform: Windows
- Release: 29 June 2010
- Genres: First-person shooter, tactical shooter
- Modes: Single-player, multiplayer

Arma 2: Operation Arrowhead (Arma 2: OA; stylized as ARMA II: Operation Arrowhead, Czech: Arma II: Operace Arrowhead) is a standalone expansion pack to Bohemia Interactive's tactical shooter Arma 2. Arma 2: Operation Arrowhead includes three new multiplayer maps, new vehicles and equipment, new factions, along with a new campaign.

The game has sold 3.5 million copies as of February 2015.

== Gameplay ==
In Arma 2: Operation Arrowhead, the player can assume the role of various military duties from simple infantry man or a special forces operative to tank commander or pilot of a combat helicopter. Also in some scenarios the users are allowed to command units like a real-time strategy game. Players are allowed to perform duties that real soldiers would perform during combat. In addition to campaigns, players are allowed to play mini-missions and participate in a simulated training program.

=== Features ===
Arma 2: Operation Arrowhead features United States Army military equipment, albeit with some creative liberties taken by the developers. The U.S. Army's standard M16 rifle has been replaced by the SCAR-L and SCAR-H in-game. New armored vehicles that were not included in Arma 2 include the U.S. Army's Stryker ICV and Bradley IFV. The U.S. Marine Corps that featured prominently in Arma 2 are not included in Arma 2: Operation Arrowhead, instead being replaced with U.S. Army soldiers, wearing the Army Combat Uniform in the Universal Camouflage Pattern. In addition, three new factions are included: NATO, United Nations peacekeeping forces from the fictional country of Chernarus, and the Takistani Army. NATO forces include the United States Army, the Army of the Czech Republic, and the German Kommando Spezialkräfte.

One touted addition to the game includes the ability to have FLIR thermal imaging technology included on vehicles such as the AH-64D Apache Longbow, and featured as rifle optics. In the game, running vehicles and live humans will glow when viewed through FLIR imaging, as in real life.

== Plot ==
Arma 2: Operation Arrowhead is set in the fictional country of Takistan and takes place in the then-future of summer 2012; nearly three years after the Chernarus conflict of fall 2009 that is depicted in Arma 2, right after Arma 2's hidden ending. In the game's single-player campaign, Takistani government led by Colonel Muhammad Aziz threatens to use SCUD missiles against a neighboring Karzeghistan, following the outbreak of the economic crisis caused by the anti-government rebels who destroyed a significant part of country's oil wells. U.S. and NATO forces are sent in to prevent the attack and overthrow Aziz government and to possibly back up the anti-government royalist faction. Players have the ability to perform optional tasks throughout the game, allowing for multiple endings.

== Development ==
Arma 2: Operation Arrowhead uses a customized version of Bohemia Interactive's own Real Virtuality 3 engine. The game allows the user to include original Arma 2 content to the game. Alternatively both games can be bought together in a package called Arma 2: Combined Operations. Several patches have been released for Arma 2: Operation Arrowhead, including public beta patches.

The game is AMD Eyefinity validated.

=== DayZ ===
In early 2012, a mod was released for Arma 2 and Arma 2: Operation Arrowhead, called DayZ. The mod centers around zombies and features a medical system. It met with enormous success in the Arma community and has had a crossover into the mainstream gaming scene, boosting Arma 2's sales drastically. As of 26 February 2013, DayZ reached 1,600,000 unique players and 2,769 years played in playing time.

DayZ later became a standalone game, releasing into early access in December 2013, along with a 1.0 release in December of 2018. Later console ports onto the Xbox One and PlayStation 4 came out in 2019.

== Downloadable content ==
On 29 August 2010 a downloadable content pack named British Armed Forces (BAF) was released worldwide which added the British Army faction to the game, including units and new vehicles.

The second downloadable content pack, Private Military Company (PMC), adds the ability for the player to play as a contractor for a fictional private military company ION. It also includes a new campaign Black Gauntlet, where the ION team has to assist and protect the UN inspector team coming to Takistan to inspect the remains of the abandoned Takistani nuclear program. In this campaign, player assumes the role of ION operative Brian Frost who, along with his team, escorts the UN inspectors through the war-torn Takistan while avoiding any large-scale conflict with multiple warring factions. The team also uncovers a conspiracy into which ION is involved and could have worldwide consequences, if made public, so Frost has to choose between loyalty and morality. British Armed Forces and Private Military Company DLCs were bundled onto DVD and released as an expansion called Arma 2: Reinforcements on 1 April 2011.

On 1 August 2012, a third DLC titled Army of the Czech Republic (ACR) was released.

== Reception ==
Reception

Aggregate score
Aggregator	Score
Metacritic	74/100

Review scores
Publication	Score
GameSpot	8.5/10
GameZone	8
IGN	8.0/10
PC Gamer (US)	82/100

The game has received warm reviews from critics. GameSpot says "Arma 2: Operation Arrowhead, its stand-alone expansion, boasts all the beauty, realism, and action of the original and none of the game-breaking bugs. Improving upon its predecessor in almost every way." Although the maps and weapons received praise from reviewers, they go on to say that its steep learning curve might deter people from playing. PC Gamer goes on to say "If you aren't open to the idea of spending days getting accustomed to a control scheme, understanding the layout and functionality of complex communication menus, and partaking in a style of gameplay that rewards patience, planning, and perseverance, then it's not very likely you're going to enjoy the intricate product Bohemia's created." IGN elaborates saying "It's a game only for the dedicated, but if you've got the desire and the attention span, it's absolutely worth checking out." Critics also point out that the game engine still has AI glitches like its predecessor. Many critics also said that the game was too computer-intensive, causing many "hiccups" in performance.

== See also ==
- Arma 2
- Operation Flashpoint: Cold War Crisis
