= Dean Hall (game designer) =

New Zealand video game designer

- Born: 14 May 1981 (age 45); Oamaru, New Zealand
- Other name: "Rocket"
- Education: University of Otago
- Occupation: Video game designer
- Organisation: RocketWerkz
- Known for: DayZ

Dean "Rocket" Hall (born 14 May 1981) is a video game designer from New Zealand. He is best known for creating the zombie apocalypse PC game DayZ, which began as a mod and was later developed into its own game under the same title. Hall left the DayZ development team in 2014 to found his own studio, RocketWerkz.

Hall was a Commissioned Officer of the Royal New Zealand Corps of Signals in the New Zealand Army and attended survival training in Brunei where he came up with the basic idea for DayZ.

== Early life and education ==
Hall grew up in Oamaru, New Zealand, and attended Waitaki Boys' High School. He played role-playing games with fellow New Zealander Chris Butcher, who later became the Technical Director at Bungie working on Halo and Destiny. Hall started video game development on an Amiga personal computer that his parents purchased him as a child.

== Military service ==
Dean Hall
- Military career
- Allegiance: New Zealand
- Branch: Royal New Zealand Air Force, New Zealand Army
- Service years: 2000 – 2005; 2009–2011
- Rank: Lieutenant
- Unit: Royal New Zealand Corps of Signals

Hall served as a commissioned officer in the Royal New Zealand Air Force for five years, completing a degree at the University of Otago under a Defense Scholarship. In 2009 Hall re-enlisted in the New Zealand Army and was posted on an exchange program with the Singapore Armed Forces. Hall was inspired by his efforts on survival training and in using video games as a method to train soldiers in the emotional reactions they may face, including him pitching the concept to leadership within the Army. When interest was not shown, Hall stated he decided to add zombies and release it publicly.

Hall was posted to the Singapore Armed Forces on an exchange program during which he completed his survival training in Brunei. His experiences on this trip formed the basis for his ideas with the development of the mod. Hall was not used to the diet during his period of deployment, and this became a further problem as the training progressed. He ran out of food during the survival component, eventually resorting to trying to eat rotten fish and ferns. By the end of his training, Hall weighed 25 kilograms less and required surgery to repair his injuries.

== Video game career ==
After leaving the Air Force, Hall was employed as a producer at Sidhe Interactive in Wellington, New Zealand, and worked on Speed Racer: The Videogame. Hall briefly left the industry to return to the army before returning for a contract at Bohemia Interactive to work on Arma 3. During this time, Hall created DayZ, a zombie survival horror mod for the game Arma 2. After the success of the mod Hall started work at Bohemia in the position of Project Lead of the standalone version of DayZ. DayZ mod was nominated for the Online Innovation Award at the GDC Online Awards 2012.

In November 2014, Hall left Bohemia Interactive to found New Zealand game studio, RocketWerkz, and announced the debut title Ion at E3 2015. Development of Ion was later cancelled. Hall announced Stationeers at EGX Rezzed 2017. The game was released on Steam in early access on 12 December 2017. The game draws inspiration from Space Station 13.

In October 2024, Hall announced that RocketWerkz had started work on a new game titled Kitten Space Agency, designed as a spiritual successor to Kerbal Space Program "To replicate the same feeling, commitment, and challenge of existing KSP", following the reported closure of Intercept Games and development freeze of Kerbal Space Program 2.

=== Views on the video game industry ===
In 2012, Hall stated that the seventh generation of game consoles were at the end of their lives, and that this had resulted in the PC providing more innovative games for the market. Hall believed this would result in the next generation of consoles competing for the ability to cater to this desire for innovation as seen on the PC. Hall has also been critical of the traditional publishing model for video games, turning down many offers to publish DayZ and asking what value publishers provide in a modern context. Hall has also expressed frustration with popular game engines such as Unity and Unreal for their accountablity towards developers, which led to the open source release of the BRUTAL framework.

== Personal life ==
=== Mountaineering ===
Hall is an accomplished mountaineer, having climbed Mount Cook in New Zealand. In May 2013, he summitted Mount Everest, making him the 42nd New Zealander to do so. He has stated that his experiences mountaineering have also formed part of the inspiration for his game design work.

== Games developed ==
Title	Year released	Notes
Speed Racer: The Videogame	2008	Producer; Developed by Sidhe Interactive
DayZ (mod)	21 February 2013	
Arma 3	12 September 2013	Playable Content Designer; Developed by Bohemia Interactive
DayZ	13 December 2018	Project Lead; Developed by Bohemia Interactive
Ion	[Cancelled]	Developed by RocketWerkz and Improbable
Out of Ammo	15 September 2016 (VR Only)	Developed by RocketWerkz
Out of Ammo: Death Drive	17 August 2017 (VR Only)	Developed by RocketWerkz
Stationeers	12 December 2017 Early Access	In Development by RocketWerkz
Icarus	3 December 2021	Developed by RocketWerkz
Art of the Rail	TBA Early Access	In Development by RocketWerkz
Torpedia	TBA	In Development by Rocketwerkz
Kitten Space Agency	14 November 2025 Early Access	In Development by RocketWerkz
Gruntz	TBA Early Access	In Development by RocketWerkz
