= Carrier Command: Gaea Mission =

2012 video game

- Developer: Bohemia Interactive
- Publishers: Bohemia Interactive, Mastertronic, Rising Star Games
- Designer: Jaroslav Kašný
- Programmer: Filip Doksanský
- Composer: Troels Brun Folmann
- Engine: Enforce
- Platforms: Microsoft Windows, Xbox 360
- Release: WW: September 28, 2012
- Genres: Real-time strategy, action
- Mode: Single-player

Carrier Command: Gaea Mission is a real-time strategy action game by Bohemia Interactive, a remake of the original 1988 Carrier Command.

== Gameplay ==
Carrier Command is a real-time strategy game, where the overarching objective is to conquer and control islands. It features a 33-island archipelago on the moon Taurus.

The player's fundamental unit is the Carrier, from which they may deploy and dock up to four aerial units and four amphibious units. Other defensive and offensive systems are present, such as drones which protect the Carrier when under attack.

Battles take place in the air, on land, and by sea. The player can take control of any deployed vehicle at any time.

When traveling between islands, a timewarp mechanic accelerates time, greatly reducing the time taken to reach the next island. During timewarp, various maintenance activities, such as managing the production queue, sending produced items to the carrier and reconfiguring the player's island network can still be performed. The archipelago is composed of 6 distinct climatic zones: Wastelands, Arctic, Marshlands, Volcanic, Mountains and Temperate. The game features real-time weather changes and day/night cycles.

Islands may be used, once controlled, in one of three ways: defense, resource or production. Setting an island to defense will boost its defense rating, as well as that of any other island directly connected to it, making it more difficult for the enemy to capture. Resource islands continuously mine material which is used to produce items (fuel, weapons etc.), while production islands build the items. The higher the number of resource and production islands the player owns, the faster they can gather materials and build items. In addition, any island may be set as the stockpile island. This is the island from which the supply barque brings produced items to the carrier. Resource and production islands must have a supply line to the stockpile island in order to contribute their materials and production. If the enemy captures an island which is a key link in the supply chain, islands can become disconnected from the stockpile and the player loses the capacity of those islands until they are reconnected.

=== Strategy mode ===
In addition to the storyline campaign mode, the game also provides a strategy mode. In this mode, all islands are unlocked from the start, there are no storyline or tutorial elements and the game is a race to conquer all the islands in the archipelago and destroy the enemy carrier. There are no first-person segments, often considered the weakest part of the campaign mode, nor are there cutscenes, apart from the destruction of the enemy carrier. The only character dialogue in this mode is in the form of the crew giving updates and advice on island missions and enemy attacks on other islands.

== Plot ==
The story takes place on the planet-moon Taurus, a pivotal battleground in the war between two factions: the United Earth Coalition (UEC) and the Asia Pacific Alliance (APA), the latter having gained control of Earth’s water supply in an apocalyptic conflict.

The player controls UEC Lieutenant Myrik. Myrik leads a team on a mission to take control of Taurus. The mission is led by Major Harrigan, with Captain Aurora as second-in-command. Myrik and his team arrive in orbit and travel to the surface in a drop-pod. During descent, the pod comes under fire from an anti-aircraft missile, but the team survives and takes control of an APA Carrier. They begin to conquer islands controlled by the APA and attempt to reconnect with other UEC units. They intercept a video showing the execution of Major Harrigan by an unknown APA officer, whose voice sounds familiar to Myrik. Myrik and his team find some UEC soldiers and reconnect with Aurora. It is then revealed that the APA is building a more advanced Carrier to face Myrik.

Myrik tries to stop the APA from building the Carrier, but it is too late and Aurora is captured. The APA officer is revealed to be Mao Shin, an old enemy of Myrik’s. A cat-and-mouse game between the two begins, eventually culminating in a final battle. The ending depends on the player’s actions during the final battle.

In the bad ending, Mao Shin escapes, killing Aurora in the process. Myrik is captured on the heavily damaged Carrier as APA forces led by Mao Shin take control of it. Myrik’s team is dead inside the Carrier.

In the good ending, Aurora kills Mao Shin, but is fatally injured. She dies in Myrik’s arms. Myrik becomes a commander of the UEC Carrier fleet. The game ends with Myrik noting that the battle for Taurus has only just begun.

== Development ==
The game was in development since 2008. It was originally a project of Black Element Software that was later acquired by Bohemia Interactive and continued under its wings. The story was inspired by the unfinished Gaea trilogy of David Lagettie (concept) and P. D. (Phil & Didi) Gilson (author team) and most notably its unreleased second book "Gaea: Sonrise", sequel to "Gaea: Beyond the Son". A film adaptation of the first Gaea book was planned before the game and a film trailer was released.

== Reception ==
PC Reception

Aggregate scores
Aggregator	Score
GameRankings	60.80%
Metacritic	60/100

Review scores
Publication	Score
CapsuleComputers	80%
NZGamer.com	74%
Forbes	70%
Strategy Informer	55%
Impulse Gamer	45%

The game was released to mixed reviews from critics. The game currently holds 60 on Metacritic based on 23 reviews.

A positive review from Games.cz criticised unused potential and frustration caused by horribly executed AI of units. It also means very bad pathfinding which was noted as one of the biggest problems that Realtime strategy could have. The review on the other hand praised graphics soundtrack and the gameplay if the player has strong nerves enough to stand the AI.

The game scored in PC Gamer review with 59%. The review concluded with "This much belated franchise-resurrection trips in execution due to unit pathfinding issues and the lack of multiplayer." The review criticised the story and characters but the most critical point was the pathfinding of units.

The game was awarded in Booom Contest for being the 3rd best video game developed in the Czech Republic of 2013.
