= Argo (video game) =

First-person shooter video game

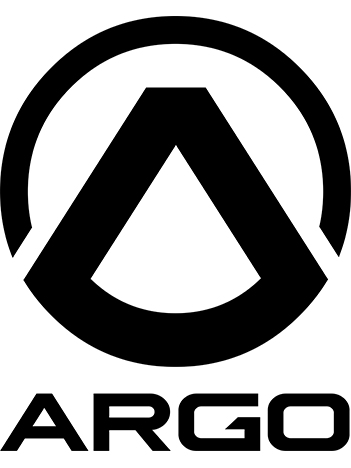
- Developer(s): Bohemia Interactive
- Publisher(s): Bohemia Interactive
- Engine: Real Virtuality 4
- Platform(s): Microsoft Windows
- Release: WW: June 22, 2017
- Genre(s): Tactical shooter
- Mode(s): Multiplayer

Argo was a free-to-play multiplayer first-person shooter video game developed by Bohemia Interactive. The initial prototype of the game, Project Argo, was released on 1 November 2016 as part of Bohemia Incubator. The game was released as Argo on 22 June 2017. On June 26, 2018, the developers announced that official servers are shutting down, only allowing unofficial server support. Servers were shut down on December 15, 2021.

== Gameplay ==
Argo was set on a fictional island called Malden (the setting of Bohemia's previous game Operation Flashpoint: Cold War Crisis). Mercenaries are deployed to Malden by two rival factions and have to fight over the remnants of a crashed space station. The game is similar to Arma 3 but is less focused on realism and military simulation.

Players can choose from multiple game modes. There is a mode called "Combat Patrol" in which players can fulfill procedurally generated tasks scattered across the island. Another mode, "Link" is about fighting on a smaller scale, in which both teams have to hack a central computer. "Raid" is a battle of attackers and defenders. "Clash" is similar to "Link" but fighting takes place on a larger area.

Argo also features a scenario editor. Argo's editor is limited in comparison with Arma 3.
