= Fairy Tale About Father Frost, Ivan and Nastya =

2000 video game

- Developers: Centauri Production; Additional work: Bohemia Interactive (motion capture)
- Publisher: Bohemia Interactive
- Platform: Microsoft Windows
- Release: 20 December 2000
- Genre: Adventure
- Mode: Single-player

Fairy Tale About Father Frost, Ivan and Nastya (Czech: Pohádka o Mrazíkovi, Ivanovi a Nastěnce) is a 2000 adventure game developed by Czech developers Centauri Production and Bohemia Interactive. It was published by Bohemia Interactive.

== Development ==
The game is heavily inspired by the 1964 Soviet fairy-tale movie Jack Frost (Морозко). The authors of the game read over 1,000 original Russian and Czech fairy tales and legends to gain inspiration.

The game was developed by Centauri Production with Bohemia Interactive providing motion-capture technology. The design style is hand-drawn animation, which were then modeled into the computer as 3D images. The game was meant to be released in October 2000, but this was postponed until mid-December with the final few weeks being spent finishing the voice overs. In cooperation with Bohemia Interactive, Bonusweb launched two competitions where entrants could win one of ten copies of the game. Due to the popularity of the game's soundtrack, four songs were released on Bonusweb in MP3 format.

Fairy Tale About Father Frost, Ivan and Nastya was included for free with the January 2009 issue of Počítač pro každého.

== Reception ==
Games.cz felt the game would appeal to children because it was simple, clear, nice, and interesting. Just Adventure felt the title would appeal to players who looked for mild cartoon violence and minimal stress in their adventure games. Gry Online felt the developers had crafted an eye-catching, cartoonish visual setting. At the time, Bonusweb deemed it the best Czech adventure game ever created, and the most technologically advanced adventure ever. Adventure Gamers disliked the repetitive fetch quests and one-note characters. Doupě said the game enjoyably extends the narrative of the film.
