= Alternativa (video game) =

2010 video game

- Developers: Centauri Production, First Reality
- Publisher: Bohemia Interactive
- Designer: Miloš Jeřábek
- Platform: Windows
- Release: 2010
- Mode: Single-player

Alternativa (styled as AlternativA) is a 2010 Czech adventure game developed by Centauri Production and published by Bohemia Interactive and IDEA Games for Windows.

== Plot and gameplay ==
Screenshot depicting the game interface

AlternativA is a dystopian adventure game set in the post-apocalyptic future of 2045, where only a global government is in charge. Only two corporations survived: Endora Corporation (mining/construction) and Theolex Industries (technology). Richard Boček is fired from his job for no reason, and so he begins to resist, discovering conspiracy and murder along the way.

The game consists of combination puzzles. In addition, dialogue choices can affect whether Boček will succeed or be captured by the police. The game has difficulty levels; lower ones allow the player to redo a failed dialogue sequence. The game has a mouse controlled interface. It features 2.5D graphics with pre-rendered backgrounds and real-time 3D character models.

== Reception ==
Metacritic aggregates eight reviews to a medium of 61/100.

Adventure Gamers appreciated the game's thought provoking dark themes. Przygodoskop negatively compared the title to Gemini Rue or the freeware game The Curfew. 4 Players deemed it a mediocre game that promised too much and delivered too little. Adventure-Treff felt that if readers wanted a good sci-fi experience, they were better off playing the then 6-year old title The Moment of Silence instead.
