= Bohemia Interactive =

Czech video game development studio

Bohemia Interactive a.s.
- Company type: Private
- Industry: Video games
- Founded: May 1999; 26 years ago
- Founders: Marek Španěl; Ondřej Španěl; Slavomír Pavlíček
- Headquarters: Prague, Czech Republic
- Key people: Marek Španěl; (CEO); Slavomír Pavlíček; (CFO)
- Revenue: ▲796.1 million Kč (2016)
- Operating income: ▼500.1 million Kč (2016)
- Net income: 636,874,000 Czech koruna (2020)
- Total assets: 1,032,294,000 Czech koruna (2020)
- Total equity: ▼471.9 million Kč (2016)
- Number of employees: 500+ (2025)
- Website: bohemia.net

Bohemia Interactive a.s. is a Czech video game developer and publisher based in Prague. The company focuses on creating military simulation games such as Operation Flashpoint: Cold War Crisis and the Arma series. It is also known for having worked on a game conversion of the DayZ mod created for Arma 2.

Founded by Marek Španěl in May 1999, the studio released its first game in 2001, a military shooter titled Operation Flashpoint: Cold War Crisis, which received critical acclaim and brought recognition for the studio. Following Operation Flashpoint was a series of downturns, such as porting the game to Xbox, which led to financial losses and the development of a sequel later abandoned by the publisher Codemasters. The studio fell into financial troubles until the United States Marine Corps employed the studio to create simulation games to train soldiers. A new division called Bohemia Interactive Simulations was created, and later spun off and became a standalone business entity. Following Codemasters' decision of not supporting the studio, Bohemia Interactive decided to develop a spiritual successor to Cold War Crisis titled Arma: Armed Assault. It was both a critical and financial success, spawning a number of sequels. Smaller projects such as Take On Helicopters were also released.

In 2012, Dean Hall produced DayZ, a mod for Arma 2, that prompted the studio to develop a standalone game. The same year saw the arrest of two employees of Bohemia, who were charged with espionage by Greece and jailed for 129 days, forcing the team to rename Arma 3's setting to a fictional one. The company is working on several new projects, including making a survival game named Vigor, releasing content patches for DayZ, and developing Ylands, an adventure game which was part of Bohemia Incubator, a platform for Bohemia Interactive to release small, experimental projects.

== History ==
=== Early history ===
Bohemia Interactive founder Marek Španěl aspired to become a game developer in the 1980s, after his brother was convinced to buy a TI-99/4A computer. Španěl first worked as a salesman for a game distribution company and made a 3D hovercraft simulator Gravon: Real Virtuality for Atari Falcon in 1995, which sold 400 copies only. He, along with his brother, Ondřej Španěl, and business partner Slavomír Pavlíček, decided to develop a game in 1997, using the money given by his former employers. They formally founded Bohemia Interactive in May 1999.

The team initially wanted to develop a shooter named Rio Grande, which was described by Španěl as "a 3D clone of River Raid". However, the team did not see the potential of the project and shifted its focus to make an open world game. It then became Poseidon, which was a first-person shooter with a heavy focus on realism. At that time, the team expanded significantly, from having only one full-time programmer, to having 12 full-time employees by the end of the game's development. According to Španěl, the entire development team was very enthusiastic about the game and was focused on creating a game that they "wanted to play", thus opting not to study the works of another development team. Poseidon suffered from an extended development cycle of over three years, causing some of its technologies to become outdated. Original publisher Interactive Magic was sold in 1999 and another publisher which signed the project later wanted to abandon it. The frequent changes of publishers caused uncertainties regarding the game's funding. Despite these development issues, Poseidon was successfully released in June 2001 under the official title Operation Flashpoint: Cold War Crisis by Codemasters to critical acclaim. It was shipped without any game-breaking bugs, and it became an international success, selling more than 500,000 copies in its first three months of release, as well as reaching a top position in retail sales chart across the world including US, UK, Germany and Australia. The team was satisfied with the game's release, with Španěl describing it as a dream coming true. Bohemia Interactive won Best Debut at the Game Developers Choice Awards, defeating strong opponents including Remedy Entertainment (Max Payne).

Following the release of Operation Flashpoint: Cold War Crisis, the team intended to continue updating the game with post-release content, develop a port for the Xbox console, and create a sequel. Projected to take only nine months to develop, the Xbox version (known as Operation Flashpoint: Elite) was released in 2005, four years after the game's initial release. The reason for the long development cycle stemmed from the team's unfamiliarity with the console's structure. With the release of a new generation of hardware including a new Xbox console, Elite's release did not gain its audience's attention. Sales were lackluster and the development suffered a huge financial loss. In 2005, the company also founded the Independent Developers Association (IDEA Games) with Black Element Software and Altar Games. The organization aimed at supporting other independent game development studios with services including marketing support and negotiation with publishers. Bohemia went on to acquire Black Element Software, Altar Games, and Centauri Production (a fourth IDEA Games member) in September 2010. Bohemia acquired the 25 staff members, technology, and facilities of the Slovak studio Cauldron in March 2014, integrating it with Bohemia Interactive Slovakia, which had been established in 2013.

In 2020 THQ Nordic acquired the entire team of Bohemia Interactive Bratislava which ceased to exist and all people joined newly created Nine Rocks Games. Additionally, in late 2020 30 people from Bohemia Interactive Brno were acquired by THQ Nordic and they joined newly created Ashborne Games studio.

The team started developing a sequel to Operation Flashpoint, codenamed Game 2, after it cancelled its open world Western-themed project, which was described as "Flashpoint in Western" by Španěl. The team had lots of ambition for Game 2 and hoped that it would become a perfect game, thus the team began spending an excessive amount of time on small details, from doing 3D scanning of real-life weapons to modelling the player character's eyeball. However, in doing so some basics were neglected by the team, and many goals remained unattained due to the team's skill and technology status. As a result, the team constantly missed the deadlines set by publisher Codemasters. Codemasters was dissatisfied with the team's work and began looking for outside help. Bohemia disagreed with the search for outside assistance, and the two studios decided to part way with each other. With Codemasters no longer supporting the studio financially, Bohemia entered a series of financial troubles. In addition, Codemasters retained the rights to Operation Flashpoint preventing Bohemia from using the title in the future.

=== Arma series ===
In the early 2000s, the US Army began using a mod of the game Operation Flashpoint: Cold War Crisis, named DARWARS Ambush!, to train soldiers. In financial distress, Bohemia capitalized on its use and made a small sum of money, saving the company from falling into immediate bankruptcy. Bohemia also set up a new division called Bohemia Interactive Simulations, specializing in creating military simulation games with its Virtual Battle Space titles for armies around the world to use. Meanwhile, the main studio, realizing that they should release a game as soon as possible, decided to rework on Elite' engine and make a spiritual successor to Cold War Crisis called Armored Assault, later renamed Arma: Armed Assault. According to Španěl, the team hated the title. Bohemia decided to self-publish the game, and launched in an early access form. The game received high critical praise and great sales, sufficient to save the company.

We can't stop Codemasters from releasing a game using the words "Operation Flashpoint". But it is not right to promote this game as the "official sequel to the multi-award-winning Operation Flashpoint: Cold War Crisis" or the "return" of Bohemia Interactive's "genre-defining military conflict simulator". The awards were given for the game created by Bohemia Interactive – not to a name.

— Marek Španěl on the promotion of Operation Flashpoint: Dragon Rising

The development of a sequel to Arma commenced afterward. The team decided to reuse some of its assets of Game 2 for Arma 2, and did not hold unrealistic ambitions for the game. An Xbox 360 version was planned but was later scrapped after the team thought that its power was inferior to that of personal computers. During this period, Codemasters announced Operation Flashpoint: Dragon Rising, a game falling into competition with Bohemia's own Arma titles, as it was marketed as the true successor to Cold War Crisis. Španěl was not happy with how Dragon Rising was being marketed as a return to the Operation Flashpoint series despite being created without the involvement of Bohemia. The team became anxious, but found relief after viewing gameplay footage Dragon Rising', which it considered to be subpar and "[did] not come even close to what they promised". Arma 2 was released in mid-2009 to high critical praise and high sales. The development team soon began work on an expansion titled Operation Arrowhead, though Codemasters took legal actions to force Bohemia to change its name due to its similarity with Operation Flashpoint. In early 2010s, the company continued to develop expansions for Arma 2, and released smaller titles such as Take On Helicopters.

Following the release of Operation Arrowhead, the company started development of a new Arma game, this time set in the future. The game was titled Arma Futura, in which players fight aliens, and its direction once shifting to role-playing. All of these futuristic elements were later scrapped, and were remade into a more realistic setting. The title eventually became Arma 3. The Greek media reported in 2012 that two Czechs were arrested on the Greek island Lemnos, the setting for Arma 3 after being charged with espionage. This was later confirmed to be Martin Pezlar and Ivan Buchta, both of them employees at Bohemia Interactive. The main reason for their charge is that they took photos of military installations, which under Greek law threatened their national security. Charges were refuted, and both of them insisted that they were traveling the island for entertainment only. If convicted, the duo faced a 20-year sentence. This soon became a diplomatic concern, with Czech President Václav Klaus urging the Greek President to solve this issue with "special attention". Bohemia also made efforts by motivating its Arma communities to petition to pressure Greece for the pair's release. During this period of time, team morale dropped. Carrier Command: Gaea Mission was released by the studio, but according to Španěl, "nobody at the studio really cared" because their friends were stranded in a foreign jail. Regardless, Pezlar and Buchta were held in prison for 129 days until the Greek government allowed them to be released on bail. After this incident, the team decided to rename Arma 3's setting from Lemnos to a fictional island called "Altis". Arma 3 was eventually released in September 2013 to positive critical reviews. Two mobile Arma games, Arma Tactics and Arma Mobile Ops, were released in 2013 and 2016 respectively. In January 2013 the investment company Riverside Co. bought Bohemia Interactive Simulations. While both companies share the engine technology due to the shared past they are now completely separate entities.

=== Current projects ===
In 2012, Dean Hall, an employee at Bohemia working on Arma 3, released a massively popular mod for Arma 2 named DayZ, which includes zombies as the game's main enemies. Its popularity led to a resurgence in Arma 2's sales, with registered players count being raised from 500,000 to one million. Impressed with the success of DayZ, Bohemia appointed Hall to fully capitalize on it by leading the development of a standalone DayZ video game, which ensured that he would not be limited by the restraints of Arma 2. While the main goal is to transit the mod into an entirely new game, the team also intended to add more content such as base-building and improved crafting. Hall eventually left Bohemia in 2014, and the game remained in early access more than five years after its release in December 2013 with a final alpha release in December 2018.

In November 2016, the company announced Bohemia Incubator, a platform for the development of experimental games. According to Bohemia Interactive, the incubator aimed at testing designs and concepts and getting the community involved in game development, as well as being the guidance of Bohemia's other technologies including its Enfusion engine and supporting services. Two titles were announced as part of the incubator. This includes Ylands, an adventure game, and Argo, a free-to-play shooter without microtransactions released in June 2017. The company is also working on Vigor, a survival game powered by Unreal Engine for the Xbox One.

Tencent acquired a minority stake in Bohemia in February 2021.

The company had announced a live stream for May 17 19:00 CEST, during the livestream it released Arma Reforger calling it a "milestone on the long road to Arma 4..." Arma Reforger is a test bed for its new engine Enfusion. On the same livestream Bohemia announced that Arma 4 is in development, but did not give a definitive release date.

== Philosophy ==
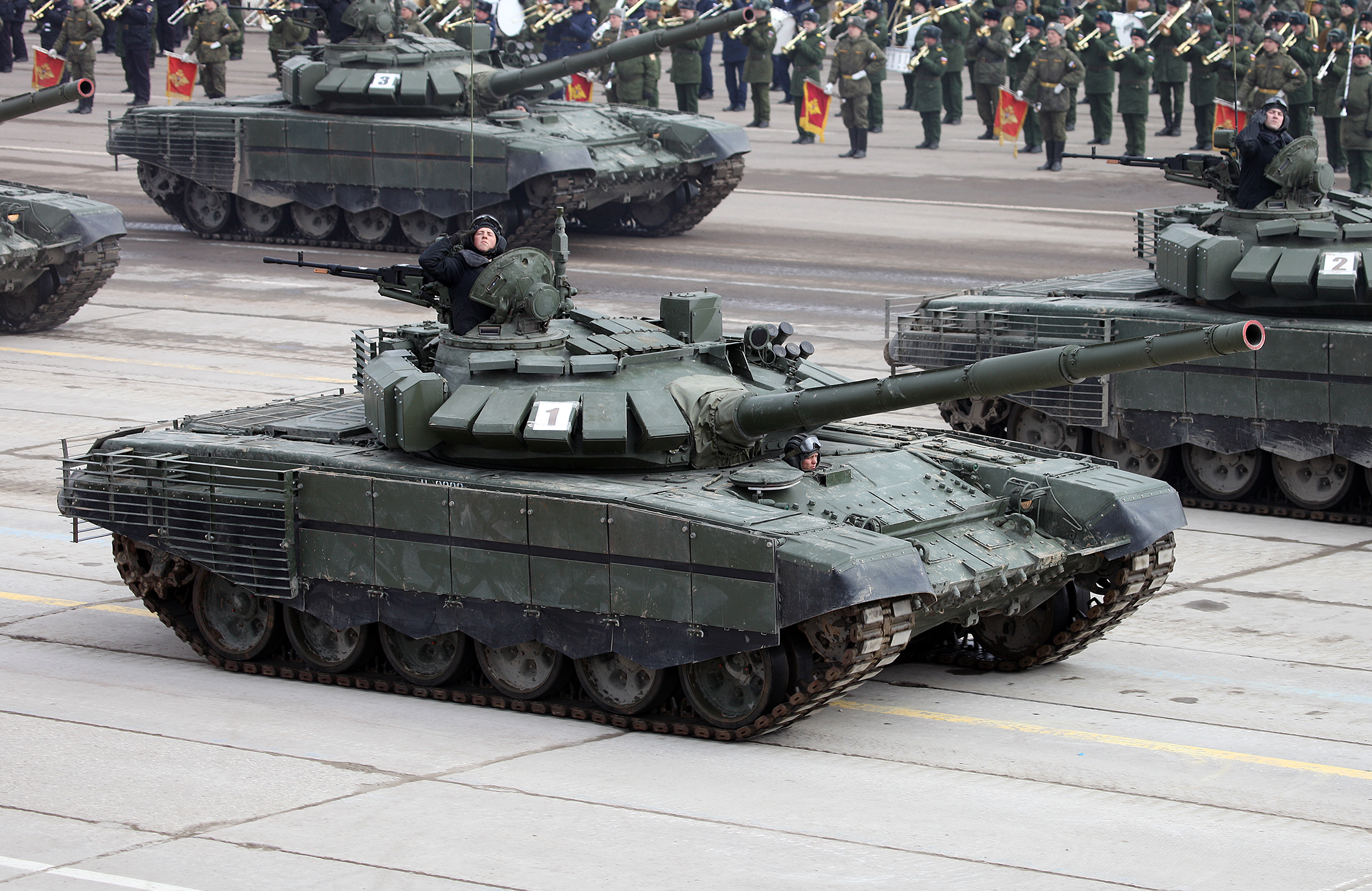
Bohemia Interactive announced its acquisition of a T-72 tank in October 2015.

Bohemia Interactive prides themselves on open communication with players. The company laid out road maps in an effort to offer details on some of its post-release content, such as in the case of Arma 3 and DayZ. The company also sometimes let players to help out with game design process. It invited players to the Czech studio to help with the design of the first Operation Flashpoint, and released several titles via early access, a way in which early build of a game is released for the community to test and play. Many of Bohemia Interactive games are moddable, a focus since the release of the Arma: Armed Assault. The company awarded players who create user-generated content with its games in 2009 during the BIS Community Awards and announced a modding competition called "Make Arma Not War", in which modders must create mods that shift Arma's focus from war into anything else. Bohemia Interactive also took a stance against pirating with its DEGRADE technology, which would automatically create technical issues to pirated copies. For instance, in Take On Helicopters, pirated copies' visuals would be extremely blurry, whereas copies bought legitimately would not suffer from the same issue. The team also bought a T-72 tank in order to express gratitude, stating: "A massive tanks goes out to everyone who has supported the studio and its games throughout the past 16 years".

Bohemia Interactive also had a close relationship with International Committee of the Red Cross, in which they partnered together for a special award named Health Care in Danger Special Award at the Make Arma Not War competition, and Bohemia also promised to follow some of Red Cross' suggestions on how video games should handle war crimes.

== Impact ==
The success of Bohemia Interactive lead Španěl and Pavlíček to fund investment fund SPM, which acquired assets including in real estate and media.

== Games ==
Bohemia Interactive specializes in making simulation games with a focus on realism. They created the military simulation game Operation Flashpoint: Cold War Crisis in 2001, and followed it with an expansion called Operation Flashpoint: Resistance. While Codemasters developed two Operation Flashpoint sequels, Operation Flashpoint: Dragon Rising and Operation Flashpoint: Red River, the series was put on hiatus when Codemasters announced its plans to refocus on racing games. Meanwhile, Bohemia followed up its first game, Cold War Crisis with a spiritual successor called Arma: Armed Assault, which was followed up by two sequels, Arma 2 and Arma 3, both of which have been critically acclaimed. The developer also had another simulation franchise called Take On, which includes Take On Helicopters, which allows players to play as a helicopter pilot, and Take On Mars, in which players explore Mars. However, both titles are smaller in scope when compared with the Arma franchise.

Year	Title	System
2000	Fairy Tale About Father Frost, Ivan and Nastya	Microsoft Windows
2000	Missing on Lost Island	Microsoft Windows
2001	Operation Flashpoint: Cold War Crisis	Microsoft Windows, Linux, macOS
2002	Operation Flashpoint: Resistance	Microsoft Windows, Linux, macOS
2005	Operation Flashpoint: Elite	Xbox
2006	Arma: Armed Assault	Microsoft Windows
2007	Arma: Queen's Gambit	Microsoft Windows
2008	Memento Mori	Microsoft Windows
2009	Arma 2	Microsoft Windows
2009	Pat & Mat	Microsoft Windows
2010	Arma 2: Operation Arrowhead	Microsoft Windows
2010	Alternativa	Microsoft Windows
2011	Take On Helicopters	Microsoft Windows
2012	Memento Mori 2: Guardians of Immortality	Microsoft Windows
2012	Carrier Command: Gaea Mission	Microsoft Windows, Xbox 360
2013	Arma Tactics	Microsoft Windows, Shield Portable, Linux, macOS
2013	Arma 3	Microsoft Windows, macOS, and Linux
2016	Arma Mobile Ops	iOS, Android
2017	Take On Mars	Microsoft Windows
2017	Mini DayZ	iOS, Android
2017	Argo	Microsoft Windows
2018	DayZ	Microsoft Windows, PlayStation 4, Xbox One
2019	Vigor	Xbox One, Xbox Series X/S, Nintendo Switch, PlayStation 4, PlayStation 5
2019	Ylands	Microsoft Windows, iOS, Android
2021	Mini DayZ 2	iOS, Android
2022	Arma Reforger	Microsoft Windows, Xbox Series X/S, PlayStation 5
2023	Someday You'll Return: Director's Cut	Microsoft Windows, PlayStation 4 and PlayStation 5
2023	Silica	Microsoft Windows, macOS, and Linux
2027	Arma 4	Microsoft Windows, macOS, Linux, and Xbox Series X/S
TBA	Brute Horse	Microsoft Windows, PlayStation 5, and Xbox Series X/S
TBA	Everwind	Microsoft Windows
TBA	Cosmo Tales	Microsoft Windows
TBA	Knights of the Fall	Microsoft Windows
TBA	Space Tail: Definitive Edition	Microsoft Windows
