= Take On Helicopters =

2011 video game

- Developer: Bohemia Interactive
- Engine: Real Virtuality 3
- Platform: Windows
- Release: 27 October 2011
- Genre: Amateur flight simulation
- Modes: Single-player, multiplayer

Take On Helicopters is a 2011 flight simulation video game developed by Bohemia Interactive. It was released on 27 October 2011 for Microsoft Windows, with its first official downloadable content, Take On Helicopters: Hinds being released on 15 March 2012. The DLC features three different versions of the Mi-24 Hind (Mil Mi-24 V, Mi-24 P and SuperHind Mk.III). It is the first game in the Take On video game series, followed by Take On Mars.

The campaign takes place primarily in the then-future of 2013, on a 3,800 square kilometer section of Seattle, Washington and its surrounding metropolitan area. In the campaign mode, the player takes on the role of a civilian helicopter pilot, Tom Larkin, whose civil aviation business is struggling through hard times. The campaign involves different types of contracts which the player earns money, which can be used to buy, repair, and upgrade helicopters. The campaign also features flashback missions, where the player takes on the role of Larkin's older brother, Joe Larkin, during his military service as a U.S. Army helicopter pilot during a 2012 war in Takistan, the fictional country that was the setting of Bohemia Interactive's 2010 video game, ARMA 2: Operation Arrowhead.

== Plot ==
In the summer of 2013, former U.S. Army helicopter pilot and war veteran, Joe Larkin, and his younger brother, Tom Larkin, take over their Seattle-based family business, civil aviation provider, Larkin Aviation, after the death of their father, who was also the owner. Only mere weeks away from closure, the Larkin brothers face an uncertain future in a struggling economy. Trying to save what their father has built, they decide to take on contracts, and competitors.

== Gameplay ==
Take On Helicopters is primarily a civil aviation video game focused on rotary-wing aircraft, featuring three different classes of helicopters: light, medium, and heavy. In addition to the career, the game includes challenges, time trials, training, a mission editor, free flight, and multiplayer.

Take On Helicopters is set in two large open world terrains (North American and South Asia) based upon real-world terrain-data. The former features 60 km x 60 km terrain of detailed Seattle city, suburban, industrial, water and woodland bodies while the latter - South Asia - includes 120 km x 120 km of deserts, rivers and simple villages. The game also features a powerful mission editor and supports modding. Sample missions and sample helicopter models have been released to support mission editors and mod-makers. The flight model in Take On Helicopters is based on helicopter dynamics middleware by RTDynamics.

== Development ==
On 24 June 2011 a community preview version of Take On Helicopters was released to the public. This version was available to anyone who owned ARMA 2: Operation Arrowhead. 4 October 2011 a beta version of the game was released for those who had pre-ordered the game. Bohemia Interactive regularly releases public beta patches for their games before they are officially released.

== Downloadable content ==
Take On Helicopters: Hinds is the first downloadable content. Shifting focus to a more combat-oriented experience, Hinds puts players in the seat of Mil Mi-24, also known as the Hind.

== Reception ==
Take On Helicopters received mostly positive reviews, being praised for its gameplay and scenery, but receiving criticism for its storyline.
