= Take On Mars =

2017 video game

- Developer: Bohemia Interactive
- Publisher: Bohemia Interactive
- Director: Martin Melichárek
- Platform: Microsoft Windows
- Release: 9 February 2017
- Genre: Simulation
- Modes: Single-player, multiplayer

Take On Mars is a simulation video game for Windows, developed by Bohemia Interactive. The game was announced at E3 2013 and released in its alpha version on 1 August of that year. It is the second installment in the Take On series after Take On Helicopters. The user assumes control of a rover or lander in order to explore Mars. The spacecraft can be equipped with scientific instruments by the player in order to study the Martian surface and complete objectives. The game includes seven destinations for the player to visit: Asteroid Belt, Deimos moon, Gale crater, Kaiser crater, Lyot crater, Ptolemaeus crater, and Victoria crater; with Mars Yard located on earth as a testing ground.

== Gameplay ==

Each mission is begun with the descent of a spacecraft onto Mars.

In Take On Mars, the player operates a variety of Mars landers and rovers. The functions of the space vehicles are not fully accurate in order to make the simulation more accessible. The speed of the rovers is increased along with their instruments. Unlike actual Mars exploration vehicles, the in-game spacecraft are controlled in real time: rather than planning a Martian spacecraft's tasks for the day, the player directly operates its instruments. Functions that a user must perform include driving to new destinations, imaging terrain, and collecting samples. Multiple science instruments are unlocked by the player in order to study Mars and complete mission objectives. Many landings are required to complete all missions for any given location. Each spacecraft carries a relevant suite of instruments designed to complete its assigned objectives.

The player is able to enter the lab where they are able to change assets on the given vehicle in order to increase the quality of the asset or outfit the vehicle with the budget allotted. From imagers or APXS to an arm on a lander, or a chemical battery, many small details can be changed about a vehicle to create a unique variant to the basic model. There are three tiers the user can choose from the first tier to the last are each incremented by double the previous tier in price.

== Story ==
The first chapter of TKOM begins in the current year the player is playing in. The player takes on the role of a rover operator, exploring the vast wastes of the Martian surface and pushing their rovers, landers and probes to their limits to complete a set of science tasks. Along the way, the player will need to research new technologies in order to progress through the campaign. After they complete chapter 1, they can do chapter 2.

The story of chapter 2 is inspired by Andy Weir's The Martian.

Chapter 2 is set in 2029 when the first crewed mission, Expedition 1, is sent to Mars. The player takes control of Mark Willis, a member of the crew. During the landing, Expedition 1 suffers an accident and the crew dies after crashing on the surface. Willis is the sole survivor on Mars surface without any contact with Earth. He has to survive and find a way home.

In a playable scenario that takes place years after Expedition 1 crashed and Willis left Mars, a rover named Elios is built sent to investigate the site and determine what went wrong. It was found a meteor hit the lander during descent and caused it to crash on Mars.

After the Europa update, 2 additional scenarios were added to the story, which mention Expedition 1. At this point in the story, humanity has expanded out to Jupiter and are now exploring its moon Europa in search for potential subsurface life.

== Development ==
=== Early access ===
The early access phase of Take On Mars allows users to help Bohemia Interactive create new content and fix many bugs the users spot. They have implemented the Mantis Bug Tracker for users to effectively report issues to the developers. They have added many new missions, since the launch of the game on August 1, 2013.

A patch released on October 3, 2013 included a workbench suite for mod-makers. Added locations Deimos moon and Asteroid Belt. It will also include Dynamic Mission Generation of every task types (e.g. photo, exploration and analysis). Weather will also make its way into the game with sandstorms, strong winds, and dust devils.

On November 20, 2013, Take On Mars received its third large patch overhaul, adding new vehicles, two new locations (Lyot, and Ptolemaeus), with a mission control room addition of a tech tree and objectives.

Bohemia Interactive announced on 21 January 2017 that Take On Mars will leave early access on 9 February.

=== Post Release ===
Bohemia Interactive released a free DLC for the game on November 15, 2017. This was the final update for Take On Mars.

Bohemia Interactive has since ended support for the game after the Europa update.

== Reception ==
IGN stated that this game will be boring for most gamers, but for a select few it would be something "nerds have been waiting for". It seems to be a great balance between science and the fun of playing a sim. IGN awarded the game by IGN's Best of PC Award in category Best New PC Game.
