= DayZ (video game) =

2018 survival video game

- Developer: Bohemia Interactive
- Publisher: Bohemia Interactive
- Directors: Dean Hall; Brian Hicks
- Producers: Matt Lightfoot; Eugen Harton
- Programmers: Filip Doksanský; Miroslav Maněna
- Composer: Filip Míšek
- Platforms: Microsoft Windows, Xbox One, PlayStation 4, Xbox Series X/S, Nintendo Switch 2
- Release: Windows; December 13, 2018; Xbox One; March 27, 2019; PlayStation 4; May 29, 2019; Xbox Series X/S; April 8, 2026; Nintendo Switch 2; August 20, 2026
- Genre: Survival
- Mode: Multiplayer

DayZ is a multiplayer online survival video game developed and published by Bohemia Interactive. It is the standalone game based on the mod of the same name for Arma 2. Following a five-year-long early access period for Windows, the game was officially released in December 2018, and was released for the Xbox One and PlayStation 4 in 2019.

The game places the player in multiple fictional countries, where a mysterious plague has turned most of the population into violent "infected". As a survivor, the player must scavenge the world for food, water, weapons, and medicine while killing or avoiding the infected and killing or cooperating with other players in an effort to survive the outbreak.

DayZ began development in 2012 when the mod's creator, Dean Hall, joined Bohemia Interactive to commence work on the standalone version of the game. The development has been focused on altering the engine to suit the game's needs, developing a working client–server architecture, and introducing new features like diseases and a better inventory system. The game sold over four million copies during its early access phase.

== Gameplay ==
The goal of DayZ is to stay alive and healthy during the conditions of the zombie outbreak that have befallen the in-game world. The player spawns in a random area of their chosen map equipped with only simple clothes, a glow stick, a bandage, and a piece of fruit, and must begin exploring to investigate locations such as houses, barns, and apartments to scavenge supplies. These supplies include food and water, which are vital to prolonging the player's life.

Beyond the basics of survival, players can find various forms of clothing, which allow customization, extra storage space for supplies, protection, and warmth. Also scattered around the map are a variety of weapons, allowing players to protect themselves from zombies, and other players if necessary. These are largely focused on a range of melee weapons, but a number of firearms are present, along with attachments such as suppressors and telescopic sights.

The game features dynamic events such as randomly spawning train wrecks, police situations, military convoys and helicopter crashes that contain rare equipment and firearms that cannot be found elsewhere in the world. Additionally, random gas attacks can strike areas of Chernarus and Livonia at random intervals. Remaining in affected zones will afflict the player with a disease that causes Hematemesis and Hemoptysis, the ensuing blood loss resulting in unconsciousness and death unless they leave the zones and find suitable medical treatment. The gas resulting from a random strike will last for 20–40 minutes before fully dissipating. Players may use a complete NBC suit and gas mask to prevent damage. There are two permanent contamination zones on Chernarus and Livonia, each containing rare equipment and firearms exclusive to the permanent gas zones.

Player interaction is a major part of DayZ gameplay. The game provides proximity voice chat and text chat. It also provides in-game gestures, such as waving, pointing, or putting hands up to indicate surrender.

While travelling the map, players can also find various medical supplies, as the environment poses a range of threats to their characters. Illnesses currently present within the game include the common cold, cholera, kuru, salmonellosis and more. It is possible to cure all of these diseases, with the exception of kuru. If a player is shot or injured, items on their person may be damaged. When bleeding, the player must be bandaged quickly to minimize blood loss; excessive damage or blood loss will result in serious deterioration of vision and can render them unconscious.

Players are able to hunt a variety of animals in the game, such as chickens, pigs, cows, and deer. If in a zone where they can spawn, it is possible the player can be attacked by a pack of wolves or a lone brown bear. Every animal can be skinned for their meat, hides, bones, and guts, except for the chicken, which will yield feathers instead of a hide and guts. Cooking is a core mechanic of the game, allowing players to cook meat for longer preservation times, safe consumption, and higher nutritional value. Players are also able to tan an animal's hide to turn into leather for crafting.

The game includes a working horticulture system, with the option to both harvest wild plants and grow crops. With this, the game also features crafting as a mechanic. There is a functional base building system that allows for both independent structures and the repurposing of already-existing structures found on the game's map. Vehicles are available to cut down on time needed for travel, provided that the player is able to locate one, restore it to working order, and keep its gas tank and radiator filled.

The game features a wide range of servers ran by members of the community instead of Bohemia Interactive themselves. These servers can be nearly identical official Bohemia servers with few changes to being wildly different via the implementation of different server rules or mods. Mods can add things like more items, vehicles, clothing, or different gameplay entirely, such as deathmatch.

== Development ==
Following the huge successes of the DayZ mod, Dean Hall announced in an August 2012 development blog that DayZ would begin development as a standalone game, in conjunction with Bohemia Interactive and himself as project lead. He said that the game needed to be released before the end of the year "in order to achieve what we have to do", and that he wanted an initial release around November 2012. At launch, the game ran on a branch of the Take On Helicopters engine (part of the Real Virtuality engine), and the main areas of developmental focus would be "critical issues", such as bug fixing, hacking, and security.

I hope I implement a lot of bad ideas... So that then, we know they are bad. Then we can remove them and move on... If we stick to safe ideas, this isn't going to become a great game over the next few months – it will just be a cool idea and I'll try and spend the next ten years going around conventions talking about how cool it was. I'd rather follow all the dead ends so I know what works and what doesn't.

— Dean Hall, lead designer of DayZ

One of the developmental focuses was making the world feel more realistic by increasing the number of enterable buildings. Hall stated that he hopes to implement bad ideas into the game, in order to find what players enjoy, rather than taking no risks at all. The game is based on a client–server architecture, where functions such as item and NPC spawning are decided on the server, rather than on the player's machine. This is in contrast to the DayZ mod in Arma 2, which had a large proportion of these tasks performed on the client. By doing so, this change aims to reduce the number of hacks and exploits available. The new engine would also allow removal of unnecessary functions from Arma 2, such as AI flanking. It was announced in November that the game would be released via digital distribution software Steam, allowing use of the Steam server browser and patching functionality.

Following the troubled release of the similar game The War Z, Hall stated in a post on Reddit that the "whole 'saga' of the development made me seriously question if I wanted to be involved in the industry" and that he had considered leaving the DayZ standalone project. The game missed its original 2012 release date, with a development update in January 2013 saying that the game was not yet released because the developers "had the chance to go from making a game that was just the mod improved slightly... to actually redeveloping the engine and making the game the way we all dreamed it could be." The release date was rescheduled and an internal closed test began on the game, with it being announced that public testing would not be taking place until the server architecture was finalized.

Development screenshot showing items (axes and cans of beans), in locations the player would expect to find them inside an abandoned building

In June 2013, Hall commented that the alpha release of the game would be a "very bare-bones" alpha in which the development team want a relatively low number of players providing bug reports and feedback. The secondary aim of the initial alpha release is to keep the project funded for further development until the full release. Hall has stated that he expects the beta release to be at least a year after that of the alpha. The last tasks prior to the alpha release were network optimizations, referred to as a "network bubble", which would reduce network load on the player by only loading events which occur within their vicinity. In October, Hall stated that the development team was on the final lap of development and that the team was "100 percent focused on getting the alpha out the door." After release, the developers are focusing on server performance and stability, adding extra features such as animals and vehicles, and improving the controls and animations, among other things.

Throughout the game's development, Hall posted development blogs, attended video game conventions, and uploaded gameplay videos, keeping the community up to date with the development progress. The second development video showed the animation team in a motion capture session recording new animations, as well as some interviews with the development team, and the third contained a large amount of in-game footage, showing new clothing items and a new area of the map.

In March 2014, Dean Hall revealed that Bohemia Interactive had purchased a new development team, Cauldron Studios, whose 25 developers would be added to the DayZ development team. At Gamescom 2014, DayZ was confirmed for the PS4 console with a release date to be determined. During E3 2015, the Xbox One version of the game was announced. Steam Workshop support, which grants players access to host servers, and a single-player mode of the game was also announced and will be added to the game in the future.

When the game released from early access, Bohemia Interactive began gradually replacing the game's engine from Real Virtuality to the made in-house Enfusion engine, along with Enforce script. The game remained a hybrid engine, gradually replacing and adding certain features before using Enfusion fully.

=== Post-release updates ===
In 2019, Bohemia Interactive released the 1.06 update. The update introduced the bear, 4 new firearms, the fishing mechanic, and the second official map, Livonia. Livonia is a fictional, landlocked, Polish-speaking country based on the Czech Republic, including its topography and climate. The map first released as a DLC costing $30, but was later made free for all players that owned the base game and the price of DayZ as a whole would increase from $40 to $49.99.

In 2024, Bohemia Interactive released the Frostline update and the third official map to the game, Sakhal. The Frostline update itself included a greater emphasis on the world temperature's effect on players throughout every map, including reworking the thermal comfort system and the need to thaw frozen food or allowing it to cool off before eating. Certain clothing items were given variants of differing insulation and style, with Sakhal spawning higher insulation and snow-oriented camouflage patterns of certain clothing. Livonia's loot economy was altered to contain summer clothing and lower insulation, and Chernarus remained a mix of both higher and lower insulation clothing. The common cold was reworked, allowing the disease to progress into pneumonia, which can be fatal if ignored. Heavy metal poisoning was also added as a hazard of eating unfiltered snow on the ground of Sakhal. Three new animals were added, the hare, the fox, and the reindeer. The new map Sakhal is set in a volcanic polar archipelago, with the climate frozen and most areas heavily wooded. Ice sheets surround most of the ocean around the island. Wells were replaced with water springs in the map's villages, and hot springs are also scattered throughout.

On October 15 2026, Bohemia Interactive released the Badlands update, introducing the fourth official map, the Nasdara Province. The area is located in the western parts of Takistan, a fictional country created by Bohemia Interactive for the ArmA series. The new map surpasses Chernarus in size, (Note: Chernarus is 225km^{2}.) becoming the largest official DayZ map at 267 km^{2}.

== Release ==
The first publicly available development build was released on December 16, 2013, during the alpha development stage through Steam's Early Access program at a cheaper price than when it was fully released. The price increased with the release of update 1.27. The alpha release was an early access build with a large amount of the features still in progress and the development team targeting the release at an audience who wanted to be involved in what Hall called a "very barebones experience that is a platform for future development." At Gamescom 2018, it was revealed that game would be released on the Xbox One's Xbox Game Preview on August 29, 2018. DayZ was officially released out of early access for Windows on December 13, 2018, and for the PlayStation 4 and Xbox One in early 2019. On June 9, 2026, a Nintendo Switch 2 port was announced during a Nintendo Direct, set to release later in the year.

== Reception ==
Reception

Aggregate score
Aggregator	Score
Metacritic	XONE: 56/100; PS4: 31/100

Review scores
Publication	Score
PC Gamer (US)	69/100
Push Square	2/10

The alpha release sold over 172,500 copies in the first 24 hours, totalling over US$5 million in sales. During peak sales, over 200 copies were being purchased per minute and after one week over 400,000 copies had been sold. The game reached a total of more than a million sales while remaining at the top of Steam's sales charts for two weeks in a row. In an alpha review of DayZ, Rick Lane of Eurogamer commented positively on the new additions but said that the game may not be worth the current price until more features have been added. On the other hand, Craig Pearson of PC Gamer said that he had good experiences in DayZ and that it was already worth the price.

By May 2014, the game had sold over two million copies. increasing to over four million by November 2018. In September 2024, DayZ reached its peak concurrent player count for Steam at 78,739 players.

=== Awards ===
DayZ won the MMORPG.com award for Best Hybrid MMO at PAX East 2013, and it was announced as the winner of IGN's People's Choice Award of Gamescom 2013, beating 49 other games with 15% of the votes. At the 2014 Golden Joystick Awards DayZ won the Best Indie Game and Best Original Game awards. DayZ won the Better With Friends category in the 2019 Steam Awards.

In 2022, two UK production companies bought the film rights to create a feature film adaptation of DayZ.

=== Controversies ===
In August 2019, the game was briefly banned in Australia due to "illicit or proscribed drug use related to incentives or rewards", derived from one of the game's options to restore health being a cannabis joint. This option was not officially in-game, and it was only available via community-made mods. The ban was eventually lifted after Bohemia Interactive edited the game in order to fully comply with the Australian Classification Board.

Did you know that 8 million users for whom we have data on Steam played for an average of 188 hours and paid an average of 30 USD gross in #Dayz? That means we received less than 10 cents for an hour of live online gaming, for which we host the online infrastructure and have been updating it for 10+ years.

Yet Dayz Frostline is currently being review-bombed on the same platform for being too expensive: $26.99 for "just a map," and some users demand "gimme more for less money"

Hmm. Please Please me.

— Marek Spanel, @maruksp - X

When the DayZ Frostline update released in October 2024, the Steam page for DayZ became the target of a review bombing campaign due to the US$26.99 price for the Sakhal map being considered too expensive by players. In response, CEO of Bohemia Interactive Marek Spanel revealed on X that the studio received less than 10 cents an hour on average for every hour of online play that 8 million users undertook, averaging about 188 hours and assuming every user paid US$30. Spanel also remarked that "nobody is forcing anyone to buy DayZ Frostline; the base game is still running for all users."
