= Arma 3 =

2013 video game

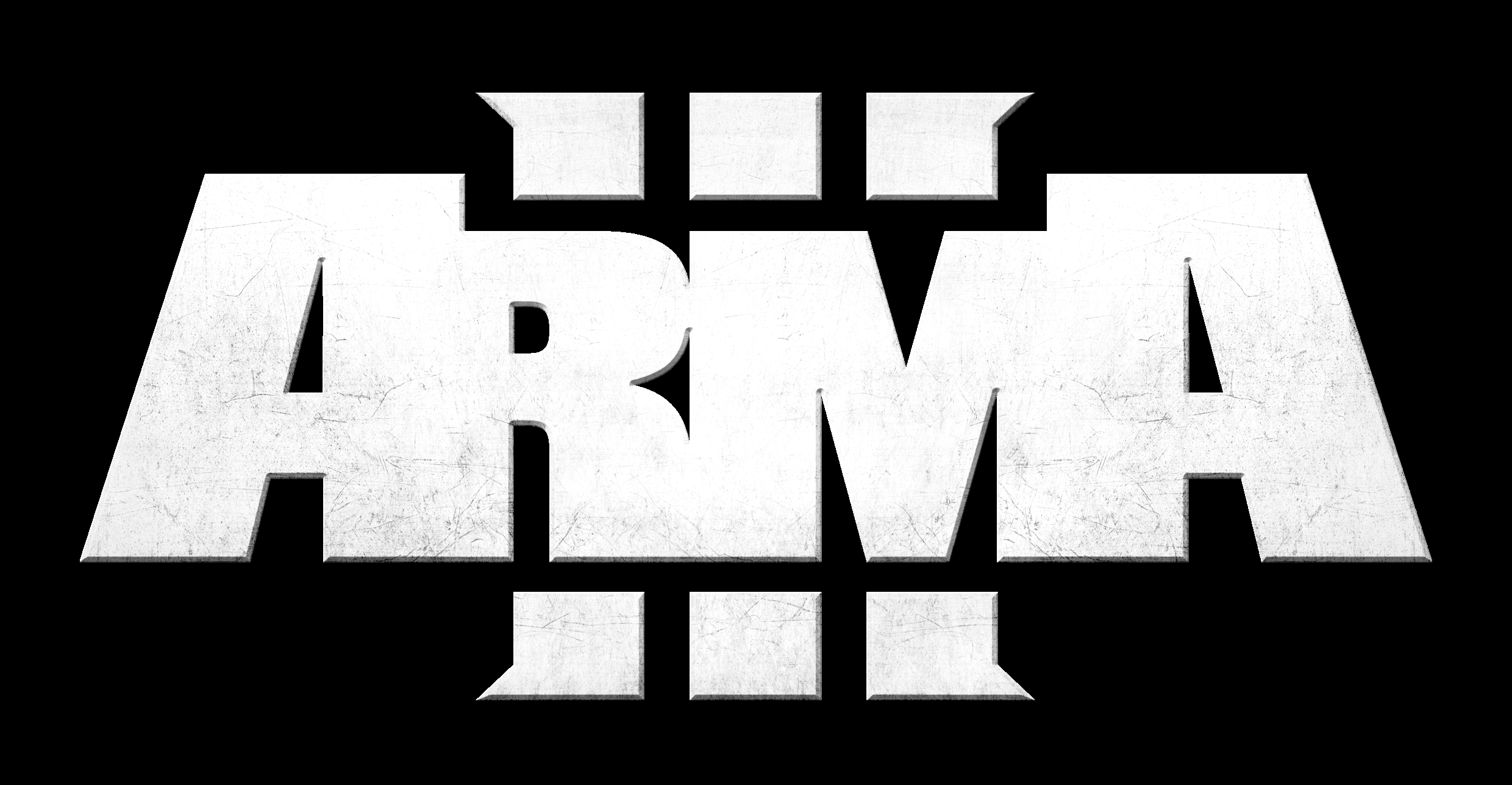
- Developer: Bohemia Interactive
- Publisher: Bohemia Interactive
- Directors: Jay Crowe; Ivan Buchta
- Producer: Joris-Jan van't Land
- Designers: Lukáš Haládik; Jaroslav Kašný
- Programmers: Vojtěch Hladík; Ondřej Martinák
- Artist: David Zapletal
- Composers: Ondřej Matějka; Ján Dušek
- Series: Arma
- Engine: Real Virtuality 4
- Platforms: Microsoft Windows, Linux, macOS
- Release: Microsoft Windows: WW: September 12, 2013; OS X, Linux: WW: August 31, 2015
- Genre: Tactical shooter
- Modes: Single-player, multiplayer

Arma 3 (Note: Stylized as ARMA 3 or Arma III) is an open world tactical shooter simulation video game developed and published by Bohemia Interactive exclusively through the Steam distribution platform. It is the third main entry in the Arma series, and the eighth installment in the series overall. Arma 3 was released for Microsoft Windows on September 12, 2013, and for macOS and Linux on August 31, 2015.

Arma 3 primarily takes place in the mid-2030s, on the fictional islands of Altis and Stratis in the South Mediterranean Sea. The game's expansions are set on the South Pacific archipelago of Tanoa; the Strait of Gibraltar island of Malden; the Eastern European country of Livonia; the Western Saharan country of Argana; and several real-life locations, including parts of Mainland Southeast Asia and Europe. The game's maps feature photorealistic terrain and water environments. Arma 3's plot is progressed through multiple episodic single-player and co-op campaigns, most of which follow different perspectives surrounding the 2035 "Altis Incident", a war fought in Altis and Stratis involving various factions, the most major belligerents being the United States-led NATO and the Iran- and China-led Canton Protocol Strategic Alliance Treaty (CSAT).

Arma 3 was conceived around 2010 as a science fiction spin-off of the Arma series, but gradually became a grounded mainline entry. Development was stymied in 2012 when two developers were arrested in Greece on charges of espionage for allegedly photographing military installations, though they were eventually released the following year. The game's first public alpha release in March 2013 made it one of the first games to be released through Steam Early Access.

Arma 3 was released to generally favorable reception, with praise toward its gameplay, visuals, and immersive realism alongside criticism toward its difficulty, learning curve for new players, and lack of single-player content on release. Arma 3 has been actively maintained and expanded by Bohemia Interactive and publishing partners, with over 20 significant updates and downloadable content (DLC) releases since 2014. Over a decade after its release, Arma 3 maintains a substantial player base and an active modding community.

A sequel, Arma 4, is currently in development using the Enfusion Engine; a prequel spin-off to test its features, Arma Reforger, was released in 2022.

== Gameplay ==
An in-game screenshot of the "Infantry" showcase mission. Most HUD elements seen here are optional and can be toggled in the game's difficulty settings.

Arma 3 is a realistic tactical shooter featuring accurate and deadly weapons that are heavily affected by external ballistics and recoil. Gameplay is set on expansive maps (officially "terrains") featuring photorealistic land and water environments that can cover hundreds of square kilometers of ground.

Arma 3's gameplay is similar to previous titles in the series, but with more refinements and customization, including a refreshed HUD. Most aspects of gameplay—such as player guidance assists like map markers and enemy outlines, NPC behaviors like radio callouts and firing accuracy, and HUD elements like crosshairs and player information—vary depending on the set difficulty level, which can be freely customized to suit the player's desired experience.

Arma 3 primarily focuses on infantry, but a wide selection of usable vehicles, including combat vehicles, armored fighting vehicles, military helicopters, multirole combat aircraft, motorboats, and civilian passenger vehicles, are essential to gameplay and are frequently expanded on in the game's DLCs. Arma 3 introduces diving to the series, with diving equipment and an underwater firearm implemented for underwater frogman operations. The game's campaigns and scenarios place the player in a wide variety of situations, from infiltration and reconnaissance to the commanding of combined arms operations.

Though most missions have specific objectives, players are usually encouraged to choose their own approach to achieving them, ranging from silently eliminating targets as a lone marksman to commanding a multirole squad into battle from multiple flanks. In some situations, various resources may be at the player's disposal, including uncrewed vehicles and fire support from artillery and mortars. Certain campaigns and scenarios change gameplay elements, add unique features, or stray from the usual combat-centric gameplay: for example, the Old Man scenario is set in an interactive open world and features a disguise mechanic, while the First Contact campaign centers around electronic warfare and allows the player to use deception among other means to non-violently remove threats.

Arma 3 and its DLCs contain over 50 unique weapons of varying type, caliber, and purpose, including rifles, submachine guns, machine guns, sniper rifles, handguns, rocket launchers, and missile launchers (primarily MANPADS and ATGM launchers), with additional variants of some weapons such as carbines and mounted underbarrel grenade launchers. Weapon attachments mostly consist of scopes and sights, though suppressors, flashlights, infrared laser sights, and bipods are available for most firearms. Equipment such as fragmentation grenades, smoke grenades, landmines, chemlights, first aid kits, binoculars, laser designators, and night vision goggles can be used to varying effects.

Standard tools such as maps, GPS satnavs, compasses, and radios operate basic in-game functions that are disabled if removed. For example, removing the radio disables NPC radio messages and multiplayer long-distance communication. The player's uniform, vest, backpack, headgear, and eyewear can be customized; vests and backpacks in particular allow for additional gear to be carried, and the majority of vests and headgear provide varying levels of ballistic and explosive protection. Clothing and carried items add weight to the player, which decreases movement speed and stamina, encouraging proper inventory management and promoting cooperation between soldiers carrying different equipment.

Multiplayer servers, hosted officially and by third parties, offer various player versus player and cooperative player versus environment modes, ranging from combined arms battles across an entire terrain to custom role-playing servers that simulate civilian life. Arma 3 also features "units", the community's official multiplayer clan system.

Arma 3 includes the Eden Editor, a level creation system that allows players to create comprehensive custom single-player and multiplayer scenarios using the game's assets and scripting, as well as compositions of assets for use in scenario creation. Scenarios and compositions created in the Eden Editor can be uploaded directly to the Steam Workshop.

== Synopsis ==
=== Setting ===
The flag of the Republic of Altis and Stratis, the primary setting of Arma 3

Arma 3 takes place in the Arma series' fictional universe, set in the near future of the 2030s, during a multipolar period of global instability following Western isolationism, economic crises, and climate change. The main plot events are primarily set in the Aegean island country of the Republic of Altis and Stratis in 2034 and 2035. Other plot events occur as early as 2026 and as late as 2039 in various other locations such as the Horizon Islands Republic, Malden (returning from Operation Flashpoint: Cold War Crisis), Livonia, and Argana.

The two primary factions in Arma 3 are the North Atlantic Treaty Organization (NATO) and the opposing Canton Protocol Strategic Alliance Treaty (CSAT), based on the Shanghai Cooperation Organisation. (Note: Only four member nations of CSAT are depicted in Arma 3: Iran, China, Belarus, and various North African states. Russia is mostly non-aligned but closer to CSAT, with whom they share technology and materiel.) Other factions include the Altis Armed Forces (AAF), the military of Altis and Stratis who rule the country under a junta; the Freedom and Independence Army (FIA), a loyalist rebel militia led by the Altian government-in-exile; the Combat Technology Research Group (CTRG), NATO's classified black operations special forces unit; Viper Team, CSAT's high-tech People's Liberation Army special forces equivalent to the CTRG; the International Development and Aid Project (IDAP), a humanitarian aid non-governmental organization; the Livonian Defense Force (LDF), Livonia's NATO-equipped military; the Gendarmerie, the Horizon Islands' gendarmerie and defense force; Syndikat, a Tanoan criminal organization that later reforms into L'Ensemble, ostensibly an anti-imperialist insurgency but practically no different from its predecessor; and Russian Spetsnaz, special forces units of the Russian Armed Forces. Factions are sorted into three forces: BLUFOR (NATO and allies), REDFOR (CSAT and allies), and INDFOR (factions not officially on either side).

The plot of Arma 3 takes place over a variety of campaigns, showcasing missions, and scenarios. The story is primarily told across eight campaigns: Prologue, The East Wind, Remnants of War, Apex Protocol, Tac-Ops, Altis Requiem, Old Man, and First Contact. Only Prologue and The East Wind are available in the base game, while the rest require their respective DLCs; additionally, the events of First Contact are considered non-canon.

Some Creator DLCs are set in real locations during certain time periods such as Vietnam War-era Mainland Southeast Asia, Cold War-era Weferlingen, and World War II-era Saint-Lô, and feature real factions such as MACV-SOG, the National People's Army, and the French Resistance. However, all Creator DLCs are considered semi-official and non-canon to the plot of Arma 3.

=== Prologue ===
After a coup d'état and civil war leaves Altis and Stratis destabilized, NATO and CSAT deploy separate peacekeeping forces to quell conflict between the AAF and FIA. In May 2034, U.S. Army Sergeant Conway and Staff Sergeant Thomas Adams are rerouted from training to assist an AAF unit, and find they have conducted a botched raid on a compound. A week later, backlash from the raid prompts the AAF to negotiate a ceasefire with the FIA in Kavala, but talks are hindered when an AAF convoy is reported missing. Conway and Adams are sent to locate it and, after a skirmish with an FIA squad, they find the convoy destroyed and the soldiers killed. They are ordered back to Kavala, where the AAF has repelled an FIA attack but is using excessive force against the defeated rebels. Conway rebukes an AAF officer for allowing his men to abuse captives, but Adams and NATO command order him to stand down; after they leave, Adams reveals the officer was Colonel Georgious Akhanteros, the de facto president of Altis. Intertitles explain that NATO–Altis relations soon deteriorated to the point that NATO peacekeepers were limited to the military-occupied island of Stratis.

=== The East Wind ===
==== Survive ====
In July 2035, the NATO peacekeeping operation winds down as their five-year commitment ends. As the last remaining NATO peacekeepers, including U.S. Army Corporal Ben Kerry, prepare to leave Stratis, the AAF suddenly attacks them unprovoked, killing several peacekeepers including Adams, Kerry's superior. Kerry regroups with the surviving NATO personnel led by British Royal Navy special forces operators Captain Scott Miller and Lieutenant James, who attempt to gather supplies and communicate with NATO. Eventually, Miller claims to have reached NATO command and leads an operation to secure a landing zone for NATO reinforcements, but Iranian CSAT forces defeat them. The survivors attempt to flee to Altis, but AAF fighter jets attack their boats, knocking Kerry overboard.

==== Adapt ====
Kerry awakens on the shore of Altis and is contacted by James, who leads Kerry through a firefight in Kavala to his position. They link up with the FIA's northern cell, led by former government agent Kostas Stavrou, and perform guerilla raids against the AAF and CSAT to supply themselves as their arms dealer, Nikos Panagopoulous, has gone missing. The FIA eventually rescues Nikos from an AAF camp on Stratis, where he has learned that NATO plans to invade Altis. The FIA attacks the AAF to support the invasion, but NATO mistakes the FIA for hostiles and fires on them until Kerry rescues an allied pilot and alerts the landing force, resolving the confusion. Now back with NATO, Kerry inquires about Miller, but NATO commander Colonel David Armstrong informs Kerry that no such man exists, and that the British contingent had left the peacekeeping operation months prior.

==== Win ====
Kerry rejoins NATO's ranks, but is put on tedious and unimportant assignments due to Armstrong's distrust of him. Kerry proves his loyalty by detecting and repelling a CSAT landing operation, and is eventually authorized to command NATO forces, though Armstrong orders him to cut all ties with Miller. During this time, several unusually frequent and strong earthquakes occur on the island, but NATO continues their rapid advance through Altis. Eventually, with CSAT withdrawing and the AAF cornered, Armstrong rallies NATO forces for a final offensive to defeat the AAF remnants under Akhanteros's personal command; however, Kerry then receives a broken distress call from a wounded James. Two endings are possible, depending on the player's actions from this point:

- "Game Over": Kerry disobeys Armstrong and assists James in stealing a mysterious device from CSAT. It is revealed that Miller and James are part of CTRG Group 14, tasked with capturing the "Eastwind Device", a CSAT tectonic weapon of mass destruction that caused the aforementioned earthquakes which, unbeknownst to Kerry, is what he stole for Miller. It is implied that the whole conflict was a CTRG false-flag to draw out the Eastwind Device for capture. Kerry is disavowed as a deserter by NATO and left to fend for himself (he can escape, be killed, or commit suicide), while CSAT learns Eastwind is in NATO's possession and launches a retaliatory invasion of Altis to directly attack NATO forces, sparking World War III.
- "Status Quo": Kerry disregards James' transmission and continues with NATO orders to spearhead the final offensive against the AAF. CSAT retreats from Altis with Eastwind, the CTRG mysteriously vanishes, and Akhanteros surrenders, ending the Altis Incident. One month later, Kerry, now a sergeant, is helping NATO stabilize the country. He meets a journalist at Altis's airport and drives him to an interview with Nikos, the new president-elect of the disarmed Altis Republic. (Note: "Status Quo" is considered the canonical ending to The East Wind, as other plot events set after the Altis Incident contradict the events of "Game Over".)

=== Apex Protocol ===
In August 2035, a massive tsunami in Southeast Asia later known as the Pacific Disaster devastates the Horizon Islands, which Syndikat exploits to overwhelm the Gendarmerie and claim territories in Tanoa. Suspicious of the Pacific Disaster and Syndikat's sudden rise, NATO sends the CTRG to investigate, using a wider peacekeeping operation as cover.

CTRG Group 15, callsign "Raider", deploys to Tanoa and learns that CSAT member China is supplying Syndikat with military-grade equipment. During an operation to capture Syndikat leader Solomon Maru, Raider is ambushed by Viper Team and is forced to withdraw. Raider later rescues CTRG asset "Keystone", revealed to be Scott Miller, who reveals his true purpose on Altis, monitoring the Eastwind Device, and informs Raider that he believes China used Eastwind to deliberately cause the Pacific Disaster.

Raider raids an abandoned CSAT black site and learns Syndikat has double-crossed CSAT and is holding Eastwind as ransom. Raider also recovers documents concerning CSAT's "Apex Protocol", detailing how clandestine methods such as Eastwind can be used to manufacture crises and spread CSAT influence through recovery aid. The CTRG tracks Eastwind to a port in northern Tanoa, where CSAT is attempting to negotiate its recovery with Syndikat. When Maru arms Eastwind as leverage, the CTRG assaults the port and defeats Syndikat and Viper, kills Maru, and seizes Eastwind. Following the operation, NATO quietly leaks redacted Apex Protocol documents to the press, prompting global condemnation of CSAT's expansionism.

=== Remnants of War ===
Days after the end of the Altis Incident, civilian Markos Kouris returns to his ruined hometown of Oreokastro to search for his missing brother Alexis, but he is killed by a landmine. Several days later, his death is recalled by IDAP unexploded ordnance disposal expert Nathan MacDade during an interview call with AAN journalist Katherine Bishop. Nathan, who has worked in Oreokastro's IDAP camp since the Altian Civil War, traverses the abandoned town while recounting to Katherine five stories that follow Oreokastro during the conflict from the perspectives of different factions. The player's actions in the stories affect how Nathan recounts the events.

- "The Peacekeeper" follows NATO Staff Sergeant Thomas Adams as he directs an IDAP supply drop and defends it from the FIA. Nathan will comment if the player damages the supplies by misdirecting the airdrop.
- "The Guerilla" follows FIA rebel Alexis Kouris as he assembles a makeshift a barricade against an approaching AAF force. Nathan will comment on which vehicles the player uses to block the road.
- "The Redacted" follows a CSAT special forces team directing a cluster bomb airstrike on Oreokastro from nearby castle ruins to support an AAF assault. Nathan will remark on whether the player waits for certain people to leave the blast radius and which building is targeted, but is regardless shocked at the negligence of bombing a civilian-occupied town. During the post-mission cutscene, Nathan mentions that NATO casings were found at the site, after which the two CSAT operators in the cutscene briefly flash to Miller and James, suggesting the CTRG was responsible for the airstrike.
- "The Survivor" follows civilian Markos Kouris, who is shot in the crossfire during a battle over the town and must limp to the IDAP evacuation point at the church. Markos is technically neutral to the AAF, but certain actions—including picking up a weapon, firing at AAF soldiers, or going too close to combatants—will provoke them. These actions will prompt Nathan to muse on the nature of the battle, and he will further lament if Markos joins the fight.
- "The Major" follows AAF Lieutenant Antoniou Dimitriou, who must hold Oreokastro with his commander Major Gavras during the NATO invasion, using a landmine dispenser to withstand the assault. After the player kills one of the FIA fighters, Nathan reveals that he was Alexis Kouris, and that this battle is what led Markos to investigate.

After all five stories are completed, Katherine asks Nathan who he thinks is most responsible for the tragedies of Oreokastro: NATO, CSAT, the AAF, the FIA, or "everyone and no one". Nathan's response and the final draft of Katherine's article changes depending on the player's actions and answer. Nathan is then tasked with clearing all of the mines in Oreokastro. Once the player chooses to leave, Nathan bids farewell to Katherine and leaves Oreokastro for another assignment.

=== Tac-Ops ===
==== Beyond Hope ====
In 2026, the AAF launches a coup d'état, suspending democracy and violently suppressing opposition and dissent. The deposed Altian government forms the Government Loyalists to fight back, sparking the Altian Civil War. With the conflict quickly triggering a humanitarian crisis, the Loyalists and AAF soon agree to a ceasefire, but this is broken after the AAF ambushes Loyalists in Orino; the Loyalists fight back and capture the village. Later, when the AAF withholds IDAP aid from Abdera by setting up a blockade in nearby Galati, the Loyalists, covertly supported by CTRG Group 13, clear the blockade and push the AAF out of both towns. The Civil War continues until 2030, by which point the AAF junta is recognized as the government of Altis, and the Loyalists have reformed into a new organization: the FIA.

==== Stepping Stone ====
In July 2035, the U.S. Sixth Fleet arrives at the island of Malden to secure air superiority over the Strait of Gibraltar and use Malden's strategic location as a "stepping stone" for the invasion of Altis. NATO's presence on Malden, which already has a substantial CSAT presence, is accepted by Chinese garrisons on the island as a sign of goodwill (and to avoid escalation), but the North African Scimitar Regiment resists. NATO forces assault Scimitar's positions, capturing most of the island south of La Trinité. Though NATO holds back to avoid provoking the rest of CSAT, China officially disavows Scimitar, subtly permitting NATO to advance on La Trinité and northern Malden. The remnants of Scimitar surrender, allowing NATO to launch the invasion without interference.

==== Steel Pegasus ====
In August 2035, after an assault on Altis's heavily-guarded airport fails, NATO launches Operation Steel Pegasus, a feint attack by the U.S. Army's 21st Brigade Combat Team against Chalkeia to divert CSAT and AAF forces away from the airport for NATO forces to capture it. However, forces at LZ Mustang face heavy casualties. Corporal Louis Barklem, the sole survivor of a VTOL crash, rescues pilot Terry Simpson and fellow survivors to reach forces from LZ Blazer, who faced less resistance and are preparing to advance. After repelling several AAF attacks and commandeering an infantry fighting vehicle, Barklem, Simpson, and the LZ Mustang survivors link up with LZ Blazer. The unified 21st BCT captures Chalkeia and repels a counterattack, successfully thinning the airport's defenses enough to allow its capture.

=== Altis Requiem ===
In April 2035, Captain Kyros Kalogeros of the AAF's 1st Mechanized Division delivers materiel to an outpost in his AWC Nyx light tank, but finds it deserted with its commanding officer killed; deducing the soldiers defected to the FIA, Kalogeros finds and defeats the defectors in the nearby village. Four months later, during the NATO invasion, Kalogeros and the 1st defend Altis' capital of Pyrgos and neighboring Dorida from NATO armor using T-140 Angara main battle tanks, achieving the AAF's first victory against the invasion. However, both towns soon fall regardless, and within less than a week the AAF is pushed back to split fronts along the eastern coast. Akhanteros orders the AAF to hold out so CSAT can withdraw and hold a better position in post-war negotiations. Using advanced T-140Ks, the 1st fend off a NATO offensive on the southern front until their tanks run out of ammunition. After Akhanteros capitulates, Kalogeros destroys his T-140K to prevent its capture and surrenders.

Kalogeros is taken to a POW camp for processing. The ending of Altis Requiem depends on whether the player avoided collateral damage and civilian casualties: if the player had bad conduct, Kalogeros is tried as a war criminal and executed by firing squad; but if the player had good conduct, Kalogeros is released and retires to live in peace.

=== Old Man ===
In 2038, Tanoa is stricken by an epidemic of "Atrox", a malaria super-strain. When NATO peacekeepers continue with their ongoing withdrawal instead of helping, the Horizon Islands' newly-elected government asks CSAT for aid. China promptly sends doctors and researchers along with soldiers, who take control of the Gendarmerie and practically occupy Tanoa. L'Ensemble wages guerrilla warfare against CSAT and the government to little support from the populace, who are aware they have not changed from their predecessor, Syndikat.

Santiago, a retired French Legionnaire, investigates CSAT's activities for Scott Miller and the CTRG; they believe the Atrox epidemic has been engineered by CSAT, their most damning evidence being suspiciously-marked containers shipped by CSAT into villages that promptly suffer deadly Atrox outbreaks. Santiago's friend, virologist Dr. Drábek of Luganville, also finds concerning discrepancies in Atrox's symptoms and biological properties. When Luganville receives the containers and suffers an outbreak, he hides his patients in the jungle and asks Santiago for help. To gather life-saving primaquine for Drábek's patients and secure support for Miller's anti-CSAT operations, Santiago is forced to work for L'Ensemble and his high-ranking contact Samjo to gain their trust and access primaquine on L'Ensemble's black market.

Miller sends Santiago to investigate CSAT research camps in Ouméré and Harcourt, where their suspicions are confirmed: Atrox is a biological agent designed to manufacture crises in target groups that only CSAT can resolve, and the Tanoans are their test subjects. With damning evidence against CSAT, Miller formulates a plan to destroy the laboratory developing Atrox on Tuvanaka Island. Santiago bombs the laboratory for a CTRG raid, and they recover a counteragent; however, Miller, Drábek, and Samjo each seek the counteragent, but there is not enough to satisfy everyone. The ending of Old Man depends on who Santiago gives the counteragent to, though none are confirmed as canon:

- "Status Quo": Santiago entrusts Miller and the CTRG with the counteragent, and they leave Tanoa together. CSAT's occupation and the Atrox epidemic continue as the Western pharmaceutical industry develops a vaccine; when it is finally distributed after lengthy trials, NATO exposes CSAT's complicity, fracturing the alliance and forcing them out of Tanoa. By then however, countless Tanoans—including everyone Santiago knows—have already died of Atrox. Left alone and awash with guilt for leaving his friends to their fates, Santiago starts a new life overseas and never returns to Tanoa.
- "Man of the People": Santiago, disgusted by Miller's willingness to abandon Tanoa, kills him and his CTRG team and flees with the counteragent. Santiago rescues Drábek from a L'Ensemble hostage-taking and learns he is wanted by CSAT for the laboratory bombing and L'Ensemble for not giving them the counteragent; he entrusts Drábek with the counteragent before fleeing Tanoa to seek refuge elsewhere. Through Drábek, the counteragent reaches the Global Health Initiative, who quickly develop a vaccine and a cure, ending the epidemic. But without Miller's evidence against them, CSAT continues their occupation unabated and restarts development of Atrox, now with the goal of negating the GHI's cure.
- "Devil's Due": Santiago, seeking payment for his work, kills Miller and his CTRG team and delivers the counteragent to L'Ensemble. Samjo pays Santiago generously for his loyalty but warns him that both NATO and CSAT have identified him and will likely kill him if he stays, forcing Santiago to flee Tanoa. L'Ensemble sells the counteragent on the black market, and it eventually reaches the GHI—but without documentation or data to work with. Vaccine tests are ineffective and a cure is never found, allowing Atrox to spread and worsen.

=== First Contact ===
In 2039, NATO and the LDF conduct a training exercise at a Livonian factory when a live fire drone strike inexplicably goes off target, killing several soldiers. As U.S. Army drone operator Specialist Aiden Rudwell and his squad rush to help, a root-like organism erupts from the factory, almost killing Rudwell's friend, Corporal Jack Stype. Two weeks later, the factory is quarantined by the LDF, and NATO is ordered to leave Livonia. Rudwell and Stype, suspicious of the factory quarantine, sneak in and learn the LDF is secretly monitoring the roots, of which there are now two.

Suddenly, a massive "alien flying object" appears over the factory and releases an electromagnetic pulse that disables vehicles and electronics across the country. Rudwell and Stype retreat to Camp Kresnik, where NATO and the LDF have gathered to investigate. NATO commander Major Homewood introduces the soldiers to researchers Dr. Ian Kesson and Šimon Čapek, who inform them that the AFO arrived to gather the roots (part of a larger network), which emit unusual electromagnetic signals that caused the drone strike to go off target. NATO and the LDF set out to investigate as paranormal phenomena occur across Livonia.

Meanwhile, Kesson and Čapek attempt to communicate with the AFO. Rudwell uses an electromagnetic spectrum device, to which the AFO responds with hallucinations of an alien world, causing Rudwell to seize. The soldiers, believing he was attacked, open fire, but are killed by the AFO's telekinesis; though Homewood orders NATO to cease fire, the LDF orders an artillery barrage on the AFO. Stype, fearing this could spark an interstellar war, threatens to destroy Camp Kresnik if the LDF does not stand down and kills Homewood when he tries to stop him, sparking conflict between NATO and the LDF. Rudwell, Stype, Kesson, Čapek, and NATO forces regroup to investigate the extraterrestrials, while the LDF attempts to destroy the AFO and the roots; both are hounded by looters and deserters as order breaks down in Livonia. After finding evidence of a third party's presence, the survivors are briefly captured by a group of Russians, but are freed by Stype after their departure.

After a particularly vivid hallucination suggesting there are larger root networks across Earth, Rudwell and the survivors meet with the Russians, who are actually a Russian Spetsnaz unit tasked with monitoring the roots. They reveal a decayed root was accidentally ruptured in Russia 19 years prior, causing a massive explosion; fearing the LDF's destruction of an entire living root network could inadvertently destroy Livonia, if not all of Eastern Europe, Russia and NATO join forces to stop the LDF. Together, they repel a massive LDF assault on the uprooted root network, allowing the AFO to safely leave Earth; the Russian military arrives soon after, forcing the LDF to stand down. In the aftermath, the world grapples with the reality that they are not alone as efforts are launched to communicate with the extraterrestrials.

== Development ==
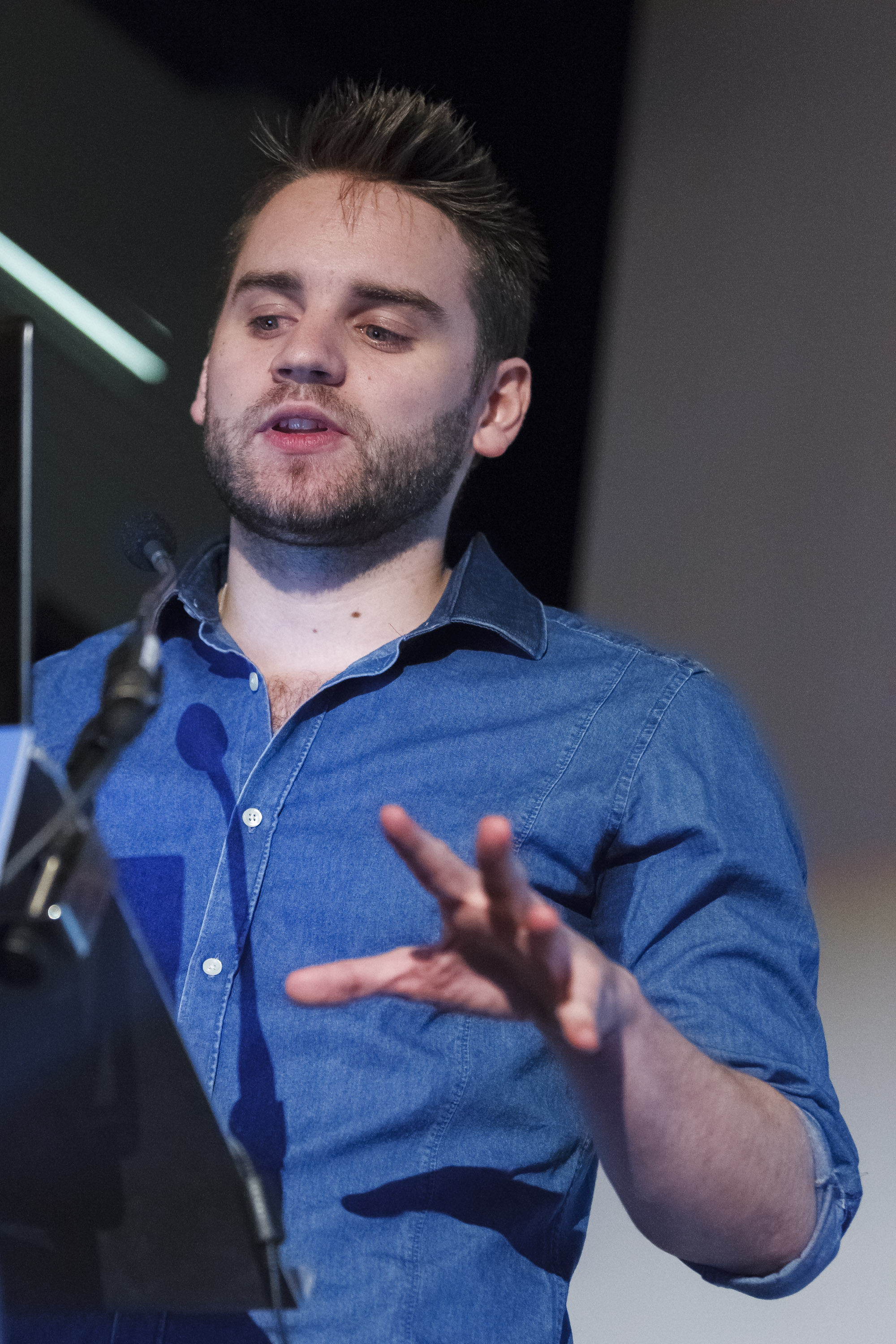
Jay Crowe was the game's creative director and provided some voice acting for the game.

Arma 3 began development after the release of Arma 2: Operation Arrowhead. In its earliest concept stages, the game was planned as Arma Futura, a post-apocalyptic science fiction spin-off that was either a role-playing game or a real-time strategy game. To develop it, Bohemia Interactive used expertise from ALTAR Games, the developers of UFO: Aftermath, UFO: Aftershock, and UFO: Afterlight, who they had recently acquired.

The game was initially set on a nondescript archipelago. Bohemia CEO Marek Španěl was inspired to change the setting to the Greek island of Lemnos after visiting it on vacation, and development gradually shifted from the Arma Futura concept to a more grounded tactical shooter in the traditional vein of the Arma series. The few elements remaining from Arma Futura in the final game are the near future setting, the game's internal name, and the general premise of the Contact DLC.

Bohemia announced the development of Arma 3 on May 19, 2011. In June 2012, an alpha version of the game was demonstrated at E3.

Arma 3 uses a new version of Bohemia Interactive's Real Virtuality game engine. Arma 3, like its predecessors, uses the SQF Syntax scripting language.

=== 2012 espionage arrests ===
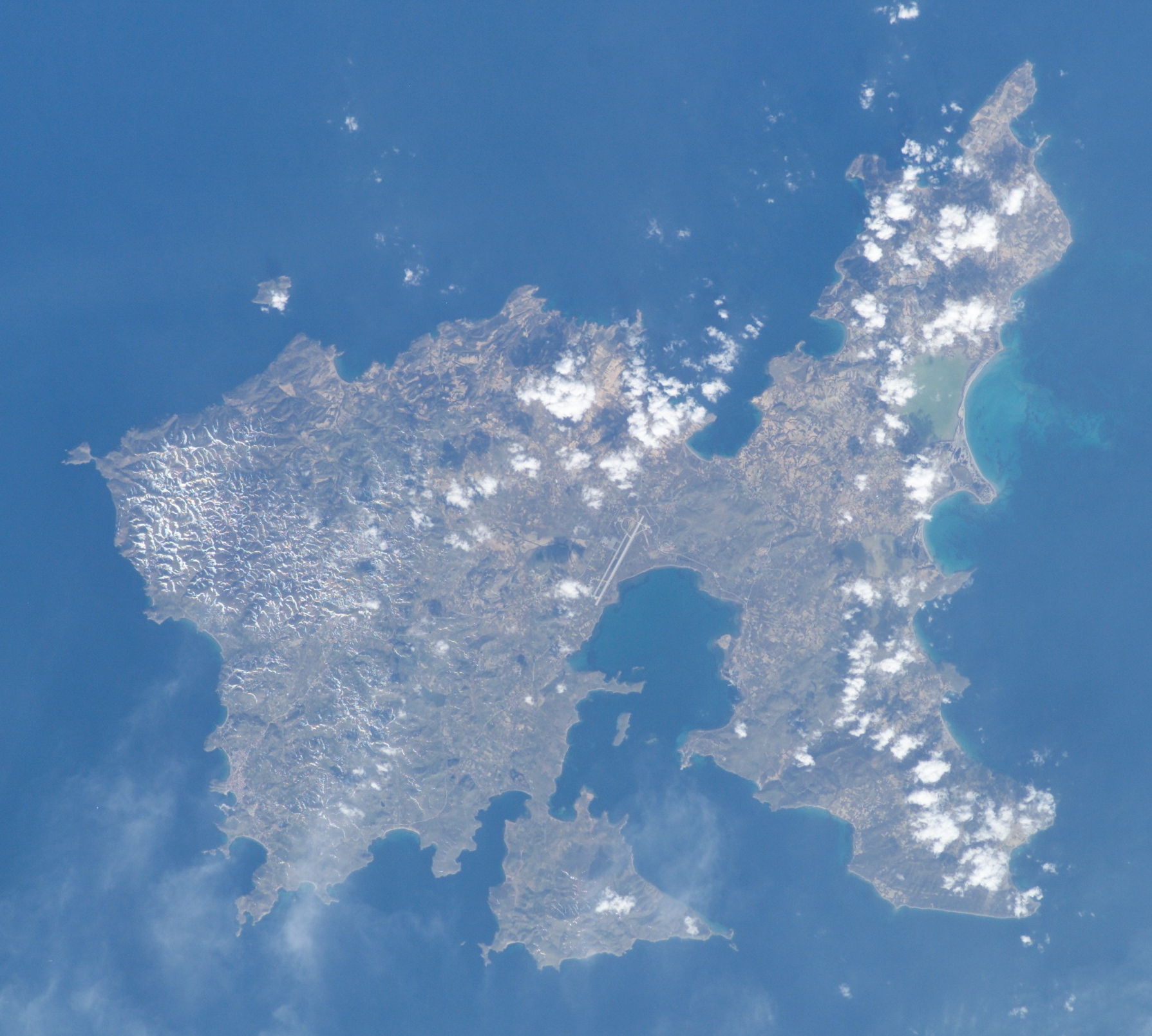
The Greek island of Lemnos, on which the island of Altis is based. Its in-game rendition was also originally named Lemnos, but it was renamed as a result of the arrests.

On September 10, 2012, Martin Pezlar and Ivan Buchta, both Czech nationals and Bohemia Interactive employees, were arrested by the Hellenic Police on Lemnos and charged with espionage. The two men were reported to have taken photographs and recorded videos of Hellenic Armed Forces installations on Lemnos, allegedly to use in the development of Arma 3. This is illegal under Greek law due to national security concerns, with a potential 20-year prison sentence if found guilty. Prior to the arrest, the issue of the game causing potential threats to Greek national security was discussed in the Hellenic Parliament in 2011. A Greek Arma fan had also urged Bohemia in August 2012 not to research and accurately recreate Greek government and military facilities in-game, as they feared it could allow enemies to use the game as training for attacks.

In response, Bohemia Interactive confirmed Pezlar and Buchta's employment, but denied they were sent there in an official capacity, and insisted they were there on holiday "to enjoy the beauty of the island". Buchta later added the layout of the island in Arma 3 "was practically done" before they arrived in Greece, meaning any photos or videos taken by them would not be used in the game's development anyway. Bohemia employees had already gone to Lemnos for development research purposes previously in 2010, with no apparent legal issues resulting from the trip.

News of Pezlar and Buchta's arrest led to a crash in morale among the rest of the development team and the studio. A website, helpivanmartin.org, was set up by the Arma fandom to monitor the situation and rally support for the pair's release. The incident even reached political and diplomatic channels when Greek President Karolos Papoulias spoke with a Czech diplomat about the arrest, and Czech President Václav Klaus called on Papoulias to resolve the issue with "special attention". Pezlar and Buchta were held in a prison in Lesbos for 129 days until January 15, 2013, when they were released from Greek custody on bail. The two men returned to the Czech Republic on January 17.

In pledging to return to court in Greece, Buchta noted, "Although it certainly won't be pleasant to go there, we will respect all the decisions of the Greek justice". On May 15, 2017, a Lesbos court rejected the claim that the two men's interest in the island was limited to the images used in Arma 3 and convicted them of espionage—handing down a two-and-a-half-year prison sentence suspended for three years to each of them. Pezlar and Buchta appealed their sentences and again returned to the Czech Republic shortly thereafter. On May 7, 2018, an appeals court in Greece reduced their prison sentences to one-and-a-half years each while maintaining the three-year suspended sentence. The two men accepted the appeals court verdict and did not further appeal to the Supreme Civil and Criminal Court of Greece. Their suspended sentences expired on May 15, 2020.

As a result of the incident, Bohemia announced the name of Arma 3's main setting would be changed from Lemnos to "Altis", to emphasize the game's fictional nature; "Stratis", based on nearby Agios Efstratios, kept its original name.

=== Release ===
An alpha version of the game was released on March 5, 2013. It was one of the earliest games to be released on Steam Early Access. The beta version was released on June 25, 2013, and anyone who owned the alpha had their copy automatically upgraded to the beta. In August 2013, Bohemia announced that they would release three downloadable content episodes for free after the game's initial launch.

The final version of Arma 3 was launched on September 12, 2013. At launch, Arma 3 featured the showcase missions, but no campaigns; these were added in later updates released shortly after the game's launch.

== Downloadable content ==
Arma 3's downloadable content is divided into two categories: "platform content", which is mostly included in the base game and is partially accessible without necessitating DLC ownership (namely weapons, equipment, and clothing; other less-essential features such as terrains, vehicle access, and campaigns require DLC ownership); and "expansion content", which is not included in the base game and must be purchased and mounted (enabled) to be accessed. This is designed to allow players who do not own certain platform content DLCs to still be able to join multiplayer sessions with players who do own those DLCs. All Creator DLCs and part of the Contact DLC are considered expansion content and are mostly considered non-canon in the Arma universe.

=== Platform content ===
==== Zeus ====
Zeus was released on April 10, 2014, as a free DLC for Arma 3. Announced in February 2014, Zeus was Arma 3's first DLC and centers around the titular "Zeus", a player-controlled gamemaster role that has full control over a scenario and can manage the flow of a game session for themselves or other players. Using an interface similar to the Eden Editor, Zeus can place, delete, and modify soldiers, vehicles, static assets, and game logic in real time.

==== Karts ====
Karts was released on May 29, 2014. Centered around go-kart racing, Karts added a Kart vehicle, racing-oriented clothing, a starting pistol, time trial scenarios, and track assets. Karts was originally not intended to be released and was simply a joke for April Fool's Day 2014, with a fake trailer parodying Jean-Claude Van Damme's Epic Split starring campaign character Scott Miller released the next day, but its popularity within the Arma community led Bohemia to officially announce the actual release of the Karts DLC as the Arma 3's first paid DLC.

==== Helicopters ====
Helicopters was released on November 4, 2014. Centered around transport helicopters, the DLC added two new heavy-lift helicopters—NATO's CH-67 Huron (CH-47 Chinook) and CSAT's Mi-290 Taru (Ka-226)—as well as new single-player scenarios and time trials. It was released alongside the free Helicopters Update, which added features such as firing from vehicles, the addition of helicopter cargo hooks, and an advanced helicopter flight model ported from Bohemia's 2011 flight simulator Take On Helicopters.

==== Marksmen ====
Marksmen was released on April 8, 2015. Centered around sniping and long-range combat, the DLC added new sniper rifles, anti-materiel rifles, designated marksman rifles, and general-purpose machine guns, as well as bipod attachments, ghillie suits, and showcases for sniping and firing from vehicles. It was released alongside the free Marksmen Update, which added a weapon stabilization mechanic, a new soundscape system, improved AI and suppression mechanics, and the "End Game" multiplayer game mode.

==== Apex ====
Apex was released on July 11, 2016. The first full expansion for Arma 3, Apex added the 100 km^{2} (39 sq mi) "Tanoa" terrain, the Apex Protocol co-op campaign, three factions, and numerous new weapons, equipment, clothing, vehicles, and assets. It was released alongside the free Apex Update, which implemented a new lighting system, a refreshed main menu, and improved performance, among other content.

==== Jets ====
Jets was released on May 16, 2017. Centered around fixed-wing aircraft, the DLC added three new fighter jets—NATO's F/A-181 Black Wasp II (F/A-18E/F Super Hornet and F-35C Lightning II), CSAT's To-201 Shikra (Su-35 and Su-57), and the AAF's A-149 Gryphon (JAS 39 Gripen)—the UCAV Sentinel (X-47B) stealth drone for NATO, a new radar display interface, a static Gerald R. Ford-class nuclear-powered aircraft carrier named the USS Freedom with automated defense turrets, and new clothing and assets. Jets was the first DLC to be produced by Bohemia and another developer, Bravo Zero One Studios. It was released alongside the free Jets Update, which overhauled the game's aircraft systems and introduced a dynamic aircraft loadout system for mounting sets of weapons to hardpoints.

==== Malden 2035 ====
Malden 2035 was released on June 22, 2017, as a free DLC. Its primary inclusion was the 57 km^{2} (22 sq mi) "Malden" terrain, a reimagining of the setting of from Operation Flashpoint: Cold War Crisis initially made for the now-defunct free-to-play FPS Project Argo and ported to Arma 3 to celebrate Operation Flashpoint's 16th anniversary. Also included was the "Combat Patrol" multiplayer game mode.

==== Laws of War ====
Laws of War was released on September 7, 2017. Centered around the human impact of war, humanitarianism, bomb disposal, and civilian assets, the DLC added the Remnants of War campaign, the IDAP faction, a demining drone, cluster munitions, a land mine dispenser, and new equipment, clothing, vehicles, and assets. Laws of War was created by Bohemia's Amsterdam studio in cooperation with the International Committee of the Red Cross, after a "major PR disaster" involving the Red Cross's alleged stance on war crimes in video games led to them seeking to discuss and clarify their stance with video game developers, with Bohemia happening to reach out first. For a period after the DLC's release, Bohemia donated part of their earnings from the DLC's sales to the Red Cross, raising a total of $176,667.

==== Tac-Ops Mission Pack ====
Tac-Ops Mission Pack, also known as the Tac-Ops DLC, was released on November 20, 2017. The DLC adds three mini-campaign scenarios—Beyond Hope, Stepping Stone, and Steel Pegasus—that are set before and during The East Wind and are designed to challenge the player's tactical skills, with unique after action reports from Bohemia's military consultants giving insight about the missions and Arma 3 in general. It was released alongside a free update that added Steam achievements and introduced a major overhaul to the game's SQF scripting system to provide greater freedom to scenario developers.

==== Tanks ====
Tanks was released on April 11, 2018. The last Arma 3 DLC developed by Bohemia Interactive's Czech studio, the DLC centers around armored warfare and added the Altis Requiem campaign, three new armored fighting vehicles—NATO's Rhino MGS tank destroyer (Rooikat), CSAT's T-140 Angara main battle tank (T-14 Armata), and the AAF's AWC Nyx light tank (Wiesel AWC)—and up-armored variants of several base game armored vehicles. It was released alongside the free Tanks Update, which added new anti-tank weapons, an improved vehicle handling and damage system, and the "Vanguard" multiplayer game mode, among other content.

=== Expansion content ===
==== Contact ====
Contact was released on July 25, 2019. Taking an alternate timeline science fiction approach to Arma's setting, the DLC includes the 163 km^{2} (63 sq mi) terrain "Livonia", the non-canon First Contact campaign, three factions, and new weapons, equipment, clothing, vehicles, and objects. Though most of Contact consists of platform content, some aspects of the DLC such as the First Contact campaign's extraterrestrial assets are treated as expansion content, and the DLC must be mounted to access these and the campaign.

==== Global Mobilization - Cold War Germany ====
Global Mobilization - Cold War Germany was released on April 29, 2019. Set in an alternate history "Cold War gone hot" 1980s where West Germany and East Germany are at war, the DLC includes the 419 km^{2} (162 sq mi) "Weferlingen" terrain, the State Scarlet campaign, seventeen multiplayer scenarios, five factions, and new weapons, equipment, clothing, vehicles, and objects. Global Mobilization was the first of Bohemia's Creator DLCs, consisting of semi-official DLCs created by the Arma modding community and third-party developers; Global Mobilization was developed by Vertexmacht.

==== S.O.G Prairie Fire ====
S.O.G. Prairie Fire was released on May 6, 2021. Set during the Vietnam War, the DLC includes the 300 km^{2} (120 sq mi) "Cam Lao Nam", 225 km^{2} (87 sq mi) "Khe Sanh", and 25 km^{2} (9.7 sq mi) "The Bra" terrains, as well as the S.O.G. Prairie Fire co-op campaign, five scenarios, thirteen factions, and new weapons, equipment, clothing, vehicles, and objects. Part of the Creator DLC program, S.O.G. Prairie Fire was developed by Savage Game Design.

==== CSLA Iron Curtain ====
CSLA Iron Curtain was released on June 16, 2021. Set in an alternate "Cold War gone hot" 1980s similar to Global Mobilization where the U.S. and Czechoslovakia are at war, the DLC includes the 256 km^{2} (99 sq mi) "Gabreta" terrain, the Iron Curtain campaign, (Note: Not included with the DLC itself, but available as a separate optional addon on the Steam Workshop) four factions, and new weapons, equipment, clothing, vehicles, and objects. Part of the Creator DLC program, CSLA Iron Curtain was developed by ČSLA Studio.

The release of CSLA Iron Curtain was met with criticism from the community, who claimed the DLC was unfinished, of a poor quality, and lacked enough content to justify its price. On June 24, 2021, Bohemia released a statement saying that they "recognize that [they] did not do enough to ensure the appropriate quality of this particular Creator DLC" and that they would be offering no-questions-asked refunds until July 30, 2021.

==== Western Sahara ====
Western Sahara was released on November 18, 2021. Set in the Arma universe's fictional country of Argana during a period of instability in 2036, the DLC includes the 100 km^{2} (39 sq mi) "Sefrou-Ramal" terrain, the Extraction campaign, a showcase, two multiplayer scenarios, five factions (most prominently ION Services from Arma: Armed Assault and Arma 2), and new weapons, equipment, clothing, vehicles, and objects (including a ballistic shield, an AA-12 initially cut before Arma 3's release, a ZU-23-2 anti-aircraft turret, and variants of several existing vehicles). Part of the Creator DLC program, Western Sahara was developed by Rotators Collective.

==== Spearhead 1944 ====
Spearhead 1944 was released on July 25, 2023. Set during Operation Cobra in July 1944, the DLC includes the 150 km^{2} (58 sq mi) "Normandy" terrain, two showcases, a multiplayer game mode, five factions, and new weapons, equipment, clothing, vehicles, and objects. Part of the Creator DLC program, Spearhead 1944 was developed by Heavy Ordnance Works.

==== Reaction Forces ====
Reaction Forces was released on March 26, 2024. Set in Arma 3's original setting, the DLC is centered around rapid reaction forces and emergency services, and includes five scenarios, static mortars, a rifle-deployed micro-UAV, and new weapons, equipment, clothing, vehicles, and objects. Like Western Sahara, another vanilla-styled Creator DLC, Reaction Forces was developed by Rotators Collective.

==== Expeditionary Forces ====
Expeditionary Forces was released on November 26, 2024. It is set during the latter portion of The East Wind campaign, centered around a United States Marine Corps Joint Task Force responsible for invading the western coast of Altis. The DLC includes new weapons, equipment, clothing, and vehicles. It also includes a static amphibious warfare ship asset, the USS Takmyr. The mini campaign centers on a Force Recon team scouting the west for AAF targets, an amphibious mechanized assault to secure a beachhead, and urban combat to capture the city of Kavala from the AAF. Expeditionary Forces was developed by Tiny Gecko Studios.

=== Other content updates ===
The Bootcamp Update, released on July 14, 2014, added training content, a Virtual Reality terrain, and the Prologue campaign.

The Nexus Update, released on December 1, 2015, added an improved version of the official multiplayer mission "End Game", a spectator mode, and multiple improvements to soldier protection, stamina, and audio.

The Eden Update, released on February 18, 2016, added an in-game 3D editor, making the creation of missions easier. It also included launcher and server browser improvements, and an update to the audio system.

The Encore Update, released on August 1, 2018, added the NATO's MIM-145 Defender and CSAT's S-750 Rhea anti-air missile batteries, anti-radiation missiles, and a static fictional Liberty-class destroyer with automated defense turrets.

The Old Man Update, released on April 14, 2020, added the Old Man scenario, an open world mini-campaign (specifically a heavily-scripted scenario) with a plot loosely inspired by COVID-19 bio-weapon theories. Set on Tanoa, Old Man requires the Apex DLC to play.

Update 2.0, released on October 14, 2020, added the ability for players for share custom compositions from the game directly to the Steam Workshop, a new firing range scenario, new variants of CTRG uniforms, and a black variant of the P07 pistol.

Update 2.14, released on September 12, 2023 (the tenth anniversary of Arma III's release), added new headgear variants, assets from Bohemia's previous game Argo, and the T-100X Futura railgun tank, based on prerelease concepts of the T-100 Varsuk tank having a railgun turret instead of a conventional tank gun.

== Reception ==
Reception

Aggregate score
Aggregator	Score
Metacritic	74/100 (38 reviews)

Review scores
Publication	Score
GameSpot	8.0/10
IGN	7/10
PC Gamer (US)	8.4/10
AusGamers	7.2/10

Arma 3 has received favorable reviews, garnering a score of 74 out of 100 on the review aggregation website Metacritic based on 38 reviews, and a user score of 7.6 based on 1048 ratings.

Praise was directed toward the gameplay, game engine, graphics, physics, and sense of realism, but criticism was directed toward the game's difficulty, unfriendliness toward new and inexperienced players, and complex controls. Many reviewers noted the game's heightened focus on user-generated content compared to older Arma titles, complimenting the ease of installing content through the Steam Workshop. Significant early criticism focused on the lack of single-player content on release, with some critics calling the game unfinished due to its initial lack of a campaign.

The islands of Altis and Stratis received much praise. The Guardian included them along with Chernarus (the setting of Arma 2 and DayZ) in their list of top 10 most beautiful video game environments.

=== Accolades ===
PC Gamer selected the game to be their simulation game of 2013. Arma 3 won the Technical Contribution to Czech Video Game Creation Award at the 2013 Czech Game of the Year Awards, and the Czech Game of the Year Award at Boom 2013. Rock, Paper, Shotgun placed Arma 3 16th on their list of best FPS games of all time, and 10th on their list of best simulation games of all time.

In 2022, Arma 3 was among the military video games featured in the Imperial War Museum's "War Games" exhibit. Exhibit curator Chris Cooper highlighted Arma 3's realism, the freedom and agency of the sandbox-like gameplay, the social engagement of the team-based multiplayer, and what that engagement teaches players about conflict and teamwork.

=== Sales ===
It was announced on May 28, 2014, that the game had sold one million copies. In October 2015, sales had reached two million units, and by March 2017 it reached 3 million sales. The game has sold 5 million copies as of June 2019.

== Controversies ==
=== Ban in Iran ===
On September 19, 2012, the Iran Computer and Video Games Foundation and the Iranian Revolutionary Guard Corps denied Bohemia Interactive's license to sell Arma 3 in Iran and banned the game's sale in the country for its depiction of the Iran Armed Forces. In Arma 3, Iran is portrayed as a member of the CSAT faction, a rival to NATO and one of the story's main antagonists.

=== Combat footage hoaxes ===
Gameplay footage of Arma 3 has frequently been mistaken for actual combat footage, deliberately misrepresented as such in fake news, or used in propaganda. In-game footage is edited or modified to prevent easy identification of the hoax. Arma hoaxes typically consist of shaky low-resolution footage of anti-aircraft warfare in nighttime settings, with land or people rarely visible, often depicting the unrealistic application of military assets (such as American C-RAM systems destroying American aircraft). Some hoaxes may also unintentionally leave in gameplay features, such as visible HUD elements or in-game sound effects.

In September 2018, Russian state-run news channel Channel One Russia aired footage from Arma 3, claiming to show Russian Su-25 attack aircraft conducting an airstrike on a military convoy during the Syrian Civil War. Channel One claimed the clip was accidentally reused from an archived report about computer games. Following the announcement of the withdrawal of U.S. forces from Afghanistan in April 2021, a Facebook post claiming to show the Taliban shooting down an American military transport plane received millions of views; however, the video was actually taken from a demonstration of a Phalanx CIWS mod for Arma 3.

In May 2021, supposed footage of Israeli anti-aircraft missiles being used against Hamas was sourced to Arma 3. In September 2021, Republic TV broadcast footage purportedly showing a Pakistani anti-aircraft tank supporting the Taliban by firing at an American A-10 Thunderbolt II. Several sources, including journalist Mohammed Zubair, noticed the clip was from Arma 3; Republic TV promptly deleted their online posts of the video. In August 2022, amid tense Chinese military exercises around Taiwan, a video of "military helicopters from China attacking Taiwan" was found to originate from an Arma 3 livestream.

In April 2023, following the outbreak of the 2023 Sudan conflict, the Sudanese Air Force released footage of what they claimed were their aircraft conducting strikes against the Rapid Support Forces, but Al Jazeera found it was from an Arma 3 clip circulating on TikTok. In October 2023, footage from Arma 3 was misrepresented as showing Hamas militants shooting down an Israeli helicopter during the Gaza war.

Arma 3 has been used to produce hoax videos claiming to depict events in the Russo-Ukrainian War since the start of the Russian invasion of Ukraine, when a video of a Ukrainian anti-aircraft gun shooting down a Russian military jet received hundreds of thousands of views before being exposed as a hoax made in Arma 3; parts of the clip were previously used in January 2020, under the similarly false claim that it was an American anti-aircraft weapon destroying an Iranian missile. Other hoaxes related to the Russian invasion have claimed to depict a drone attack on Russian naval vessels, an attack helicopter destroying a Russian convoy, Ukrainian soldiers ambushing a Russian tank with an NLAW, and Russian missiles destroying crewed NATO tanks traveling to Ukraine.

Bohemia Interactive is aware of the frequent use of Arma games in military hoaxes, and has confirmed Arma 3's use in several hoaxes. Bohemia CEO Marek Španěl told PC Gamer in 2012 that he was "surprised" that Arma gameplay could be confused for real footage so easily. In November 2022, Bohemia officially acknowledged and condemned the use of Arma games in combat footage hoaxes, and published an official guide to help viewers identify hoaxes made in video games.

== Sequels ==
Arma 4, a sequel to Arma 3, was announced on May 17, 2022. It was later announced during Bohemia Interactive's 25th Anniversary Concert that the sequel would be releasing in 2027.

Arma Reforger, a spin-off game using the new Enfusion engine, was announced and entered early access on May 17, 2022. Arma Reforger is the first game in the series to be released simultaneously on PC and Xbox Series X/S, later being added to PlayStation 5 on December 12th, 2024.
