= Operation Flashpoint: Resistance =

2002 video game

- Developer: Bohemia Interactive Studio
- Publisher: Codemasters
- Director: Marek Španěl
- Designer: Viktor Bocan
- Programmer: Ondřej Španěl
- Composer: Ondřej Matějka
- Series: Operation Flashpoint
- Platforms: Windows, Linux, Xbox
- Release: Windows: NA/EU: 28 June 2002; AU: 16 July 2002; Linux; 21 March 2003; Xbox: EU/AU: 28 October 2005; NA: 8 November 2005
- Genre: Tactical shooter
- Modes: Single-player, multiplayer

Operation Flashpoint: Resistance (Czech: Operace Flashpoint: Resistance, also known as ARMA: Resistance) is an expansion pack to Operation Flashpoint: Cold War Crisis. It was developed by Bohemia Interactive, authors of the original game, and published by Codemasters. It is the second expansion of Operation Flashpoint, the first one being Operation Flashpoint: Red Hammer, which was developed by Codemasters. Resistance was later re-released as part of ArmA: Cold War Assault.

The expansion adds a new campaign, which takes place on the fictional island of Nogova. The island's towns and villages are mostly named after real locations in the Czech Republic. The plot is inspired by the Warsaw Pact invasion of Czechoslovakia.

The story takes place in 1982, three years before the events of Operation Flashpoint: Cold War Crisis. The player takes on the role of an ex-special operations soldier, Victor Troska, who joins and comes to lead a resistance movement fighting against the Soviet Army, which has invaded his country.

== Gameplay ==
Player controls the character of Victor Troska who leads a Squad of partisans against Soviet Enemies.

The gameplay is the same as the original game. It varies significantly depending on the player's role, but the game is best described as a tactical shooter with significant vehicle elements and minor real-time tactics elements. OFP 's gameplay is largely team oriented and the player spends much of the game with a squad of up to 11 AI controlled members, either as a member of the squad or as its leader. On-foot gameplay and the vehicle elements are blended seamlessly and the player can get into any available vehicle at any time, orders and mission conditions permitting. Whether on foot or in a vehicle the player can view the action from both first and third-person views, as well as an additional 'command view' available to squad leaders which gives the player a limited birds-eye view of the surrounding area. At the start of each mission the player is presented with a briefing explaining the situation, describing the player's goals in the mission and, often, providing further information in the form of notes. Once in-game the player is provided with a map, compass, watch, and a notebook. Depending on the mission the player may be required to participate in and complete a variety of tasks, from simply driving a truck or guarding bases to attacking or defending various objectives, patrols, reconnaissance and sabotage behind enemy lines, air support, or any combination of these and more.

When the player is given command of a squad of NPCs, the game becomes more strategy oriented. As a leader the player is responsible for guiding the squad to its objectives and is able to issue a wide variety of orders to men under their command, such as movement orders, designation of priority targets, formation orders and various other tactical instructions governing how they should behave such as holding fire or attacking only select targets. He must also provide the weapons for the guerilla fighters (mostly from defeated Soviet forces). His task is also to minimize the losses of men and equipment as both are available in limited numbers.

Resistance features updated graphics, sounds, and multiplayer mechanics. Unlike Cold War Crisis, which is more focused on infantry combat, Resistance focuses heavily on guerrilla warfare and its tactics such as raids, ambushes, escape, and evasion. The player can also control AI guerrilla units giving it an RTS feel. There are also many weapons and vehicles ranging from Tokarev pistols and AK-47 assault rifles, to LAW rocket launchers and Hind attack helicopters. Multiplayer mode is also included, which can be PvP or co-op. The mission editor from Cold War Crisis has been retained, where players can create their own multiplayer maps. In the beginning of the game, an invasion takes place from a civilian's point of view. In certain missions, the player can call for guerrilla reinforcements, but only in missions where it is part of the objective.

== Plot ==
The story is set to a 95 km^{2} large island of Nogova.

In 1982, Victor "Viking Viki" Troska (voiced by Stephen Critchlow), is an ex-special operations soldier who has returned to his homeland of Nogova after years in exile serving with British special forces. Nogova is a small and quaint island nation whose coalition government has recently collapsed. The island is then invaded by the Soviet Union after some members of the Nogovan Communist Party betray the country and invite Soviet forces to overthrow the government and install a socialist puppet regime. Troska is approached by Nogovans who are resisting the Soviet occupation and asked to join them. Initially, Troska refuses to have any part in the fighting and rebukes them because he wants to put combat behind him and also he believes that any resistance will be futile and the inexperience of the partisans will get them killed. Later, a wounded guerrilla fighter being pursued by Soviet soldiers takes refuge in Troska's shed. When Soviet soldiers, led by Colonel Guba, arrive and threaten to shoot Troska and his friends if they do not co-operate, Troska is forced to make a decision: betraying the partisan, trying to negotiate with the Soviets or fighting off the Soviet soldiers and joining the resistance.

- The first choice makes Victor to join the Soviets who give him a task to locate the main resistance base and reveal its position to Soviets. After finding the base, Victor is once again forced to decide whether he will betray the partisans or lead the Soviets to the false location to join the resistance anyway. If he chooses to betray them, the Soviets win and Victor is executed with the other partisans as a traitor who cannot be trusted because he betrayed his close friends.
- The second choice only makes the Soviets more angry and the negotiation is unsuccessful.
- The last choice forces Victor to grab the gun, kill the Soviets holding him and his friends at gunpoint, and escape to join the resistance.

When Victor joins the resistance, he is immediately forced to take command and fight the Soviets who attack their base and kill the resistance commander. Then he leads his unit to attack Soviet bases and convoys to obtain weapons, ammunition, and tanks as the resistance forces only have a limited supply of weapons. Besides the fighting, this becomes a very important objective through all throughout the campaign. After some initial successful actions against remote Soviet outposts more people begin to join the resistance, making it stronger.

Later, the resistance receives some weapons and supplies from the U.S. who also send an old friend of Victor's, Major James Gastovski, and his team in to assist the resistance. Victor is also helped by "Tasmanian Devil", an informant of unknown identity who passes critical information to him via radio (he is later discovered by the Soviets and killed).

The successful actions drive the Soviets back until they are pushed to the airfield where Guba holds his tactical bombers to be used to obliterate Nogova after the Soviet retreat. After initial refusal of U.S. assistance and failed attempt of special forces to destroy the bombers, Victor manages to destroy them. However, the Soviets surround him, leaving his ultimate fate uncertain, most likely being dead. Then the Soviets launch an offensive which puts the resistance on the brink of defeat, but U.S. forces sent by Colonel Blake wipe out the remaining Soviet forces. Guba escapes in a helicopter before the final defeat and James Gastovski, disappointed after losing his friend and Colonel Guba's escape, leaves the army.

== Development ==
Bohemia Interactive released Operation Flashpoint: Cold War Crisis in 2001; the game was a huge success for the company. Bohemia Interactive supported the game by releasing new addons and patches but eventually decided that they should make "something bigger." They started to work on a new expansion called Operation Flashpoint: Outrage. This expansion was meant primarily for Central and Eastern Europe, while Codemasters, publisher of the game, worked on Operation Flashpoint: Red Hammer, which was meant to release overseas. Outrage was later renamed to Resistance as Codemasters disliked the name. Resistance was officially announced in February 2002 and released on 28 June 2002 in North America and Europe, and on 16 July in Australia. It received positive acclaim from players and critics alike. A dedicated server for Linux was made available on 21 March 2003. An Xbox version was released in 2005 as part of Operation Flashpoint: Elite in Europe and Australia on 28 October, and in North America on 8 November.

Resistance was re-released in 2011 as part of ArmA: Cold War Assault when the contract between Bohemia Interactive and Codemasters expired. This version was patched and upgraded for modern computers and newer operating systems.

== Reception ==
Reception

Aggregate scores
Aggregator	Score
GameRankings	81%
Metacritic	77%

Review scores
Publication	Score
PC Gamer	79%
IGN	79%
Game Spy	90%
Computer Gaming World	90%
PC Zone UK	83%
Games.cz	90%
Bonusweb	81%

Resistance was released to very positive reviews. It was praised for its story and the whole idea of guerrilla warfare as well as for its missions and technical improvements but it was also criticised by some reviews. Technical improvements are according to some critics unnoticeable and missions were criticised for less variety than the original game. GameSpot named it a runner-up for its July 2002 "PC Game of the Month" award.

ActionTrip released a review that praised the guerilla warfare and extra content. On the other hand, it noted the dated engine and dodgy AI.

GameRevolution praised the fact that, unlike the original, player controls only one character in the story which makes it easier to attach to him. The Review also praised the level design and the new campaign with a solid story but with less variety than the original.

GameVortex criticized the Resistance expansion for not being any big improvement but underlined that the single-player campaign has a replay value, and also praised the Multi-player aspect. The review recommended the expansion only to those who loved the original.

Resistance was nominated for GameSpot's annual "Best Expansion Pack on PC" award.
