= Arma: Queen's Gambit =

2007 video game

- Developers: Bohemia Interactive; Black Element Software
- Publisher: 505 Games
- Series: Arma
- Engine: Real Virtuality
- Platform: Microsoft Windows
- Release: WW: 28 September 2007
- Genre: Tactical shooter
- Modes: Single-player, multiplayer

Arma: Queen's Gambit (stylized as ARMA: Queen's Gambit) is an expansion pack to Arma: Armed Assault. It was made by Bohemia Interactive, the developer of the original game and Black Element Software. It contains new units, weapons, islands and campaigns.

== Plot ==
The first campaign "Rahmadi Conflict" is a follow-up to the original storyline. Player takes role of Leon Ortega who leads a U.S. Army Special Forces team. He is sent to nearby island of Rahmadi where the remaining of Sahrani Liberation Army is located and led by a mysterious leader, called "the President". The campaign consists of three missions and takes place on Rahmadi and a new island Porto.

The other campaign, "Royal Flush", takes place on Sahrani a few years after the original storyline. The island is united, but the people from the northern part of the island together with the refugees from the south are dissatisfied with the monarchy which evolved into an oppressive regime. A group of mercenaries from Black Element private military company is hired by Sahrani queen Isabella who has taken the throne after a sudden death of her father, King Jose and her brother, Prince Orlando in a helicopter crash, causing a full scale-insurgency on the north. They are supposed to fight anti-government insurgents on North and to seize a stockpile of chemical weapons believed to be in possession of the rebels. Player takes role of Kurt Lambowski who is a member of the group. Before arriving to Sahrani, Lambowski believes there is something fishy about the Queen who is unable to quell the insurgency despite having well-trained armed forces at hand. This proves true during the campaign as the team discovers that the Queen is a ruthless leader who runs a police state and puts the opponents to the concentration camps. Which is more – Prince Orlando is alive and leads the rebels. With these facts at hand, the team decides to help the rebels.

Depending on the player's decisions the Queen is either overthrown (killed or escapes) or she manages to get Prince Orlando killed, forcing the contractors to hastily leave the island and they are later branded as the rogue contractors. The allegations about the involvement of Black Element company in a coup d'état is one of the reasons for a later rebranding of the company name to ION Services.

== Characters ==
- Kurt Lambowski – The player character. He is the grenadier of the group.
- John Wicks – The leader of mercenaries, but is killed, leaving Kurt as the Team Leader.
- Orlando – Prince Orlando is the heir of Sahrani throne. He leads the Partisans who are trying to overthrow Isabella for her crimes.
- Isabella – The Queen of Sahrani. She has taken the power over the country when her brother seemed to be dead.

== Reception ==
Critical reception of Arma: Queen's Gambit was mixed; the game currently holds 67% on Metacritic.
