= Operation Flashpoint: Red River =

2011 video game

- Developer: Codemasters
- Publisher: Codemasters
- Director: Sion Lenton
- Producer: Adam Parsons
- Series: Operation Flashpoint
- Platforms: Microsoft Windows; PlayStation 3 Xbox 360; OnLive
- Release: EU: April 21, 2011; NA: June 7, 2011
- Genre: Tactical shooter
- Modes: Single-player, multiplayer

Operation Flashpoint: Red River is a 2011 tactical shooter video game developed and published by Codemasters for Microsoft Windows, PlayStation 3 and Xbox 360. It is the sequel to Operation Flashpoint: Dragon Rising and the final game of the Operation Flashpoint series.

== Gameplay ==
Operation Flashpoint: Red River is a tactical shooter. The player has the choice of playing the campaign co-operatively. However, the game does not feature competitive multiplayer. The game does not feature a mission editor or SDK. The player will be able to choose between four classes of Marines; rifleman, grenadier, scout, and automatic rifleman, each with their own weapons and abilities. The player will gain experience during gameplay, which can be used to unlock weapons, attachments and perks. For example, a scout could acquire an enhancement that will reduce the amount of bullet drop. The game's director Sion Lenton said "Operation Flashpoint: Red River is being built around four player co-op online play, complete with a strong narrative, new enemies and combat scenarios to deliver gameplay that immerses players in the reality of war like never before." The enemies will be able to kill the player with a single shot. The single player campaign will be divided into three distinct acts.

The game uses a video camera style feedback in the game for the action. With shots near the player getting dirt in the players vision similar to a lens would, and damage scrambling the screen, along with losing stamina causes parts of the screen to scramble and freeze in some places until the player rests.

== Plot ==
The player assumes control of "Outlaw 2 Bravo", a United States Marine Corps fireteam during a fictional conflict in Tajikistan in 2013.

The terrorist group, East Turkestan Islamic Movement (ETIM) launches mortar attacks on a U.S. forward operating base (FOB) in Afghanistan, prompting the United States to launch Operation Enduring Shield, invading western Tajikistan to wipe out the insurgent threat. Outlaw platoon is tasked with capturing several villages and an airfield, along with defusing IEDs and taking several insurgent positions. The unit is then tasked with securing and repairing a dam, while at the same time reinforcing Forward Operating Base Viper, located close by.

Outlaw is ordered to quell the remaining insurgents located in a stronghold. After reaching the stronghold, the Chinese People's Liberation Army intervenes, having invaded eastern Tajikistan in retaliation for the ETIM massacring Chinese athletes during the London 2012 Summer Olympics. Outlaw is ordered to slow the PLA advance while other Marines are evacuated to a secondary FOB. After Outlaw reaches the FOB, it is attacked by a PLA mechanized division. After a fierce battle, Outlaw barely escapes from the FOB, with their commanding officer telling them that they are the only unit who made it out.

The remaining marines conduct a guerilla war against the PLA. First, they ambush and destroy a PLA supply convoy in order to cripple the PLA supply lines. After that, the members of Outlaw learn that in order to halt the PLA advance in western Tajikistan, the remaining Marines need to prevent a set of bridges from falling in the PLA's hands. Even though they are heavily outnumbered, the Marines manage to hold out long enough for reinforcements to arrive from Afghanistan.

After the fight at the bridges the Marines start pushing the PLA back. They fight through PLA defenses and towns to secure an old fortress and establish a new FOB there. In order to have air support for the last battle, Outlaw attacks PLA SAMs at an old observatory. After knocking out the SAMs, Outlaw launches an attack on a town in the middle of the battle. After pushing through the town, with support from LAVs, Outlaw holds off a massive PLA counterattack with help from artillery and aircraft. In the end, the U.S. Marines push the PLA back across the border, into China.

== Reception ==
Reception

Aggregate scores
Aggregator	Score
GameRankings	(PC) 67.20% (PS3) 65.88% (X360) 69.11%
Metacritic	(PC) 67/100 (PS3) 67/100 (X360) 69/100

Review scores
Publication	Score
Eurogamer	8/10
Game Informer	6/10
GameRevolution	4/10
GameSpot	6.5/10
GamesRadar+	3/5
IGN	7.5/10
The Guardian	4/5
VentureBeat	5.5/10
VideoGamer.com	7/10
Strategy Informer	8/10
PC Gamer	45/100

The game has received mixed reviews. Strategy Informer stated that the game "fills in a niche between fast-paced action games and hyper-realistic military simulators". VideoGamer.com says the campaign is of far higher quality than in its predecessor, Dragon Rising. IGN was disappointed in player movement being locked to only a very small section of the wide-open terrain. PC Gamer criticized the poor artificial intelligence of players' teammates and the overly macho voice acting. "Red River takes all the things the Flashpoint name is associated with – creative, emergent destruction and go-anywhere realism – and lets them wash away." GameZone gave the game a 7.5 out of 10, stating "Operation Flashpoint: Red River isn't your typical shooter. You're not going to be a gunslinger, running into a compound to take out a horde of enemies like a one-man wolf pack. It's a slower, more tactical, squad-based shooter that relies on teamwork, strategy, and finesse."

Eurogamer praised the game's realism, tense gameplay, and realistic dialogue, noting that the missions were intentionally long and arduous, while criticizing the game's animation, vehicle sections, and AI. Game Informer wrote, "...as Red River demonstrates, an unchecked dedication to realism can cripple the entertainment factor," while similarly criticizing the AI, recommending the four-player co-op experience over playing solo. VentureBeat noted that the game "compels to hardcore audiences only", heavily criticizing the tedious nature of the game. GameSpot and GamesRadar+ praised the tactical missions, co-op campaign, and player expression, while taking issue with the lackluster graphics and poor AI.
