= Operation Flashpoint: Dragon Rising =

2009 video game

- Developer: Codemasters
- Publisher: Codemasters
- Producer: Sion Lenton
- Designer: James Nicholls
- Composer: Christian Marcussen
- Series: Operation Flashpoint
- Engine: EGO Engine
- Platforms: Microsoft Windows; PlayStation 3; Xbox 360
- Release: NA: 6 October 2009; EU: 8 October 2009; AU: 15 October 2009; UK: 9 October 2009
- Genre: Tactical shooter
- Modes: Single-player, multiplayer

Operation Flashpoint: Dragon Rising is a tactical shooter video game for Microsoft Windows, PlayStation 3 and Xbox 360 developed and published by Codemasters. Codemasters has advertised the game as a tactical shooter designed to represent modern infantry combat realistically. It is a stand-alone sequel to Bohemia Interactive's Operation Flashpoint: Cold War Crisis, but was developed entirely by Codemasters due to a falling-out between the two companies.

== Plot ==
Dragon Rising takes place on the fictional island of Skira, in May 2011. After the 2008 financial crisis causes mass unemployment and political destabilization in China, the People's Liberation Army (PLA) seize control of Skira and the vast, newly discovered reservoir of oil there, from the Russian Federation. Peace talks prove useless as both combatants lay claim to Skira due to previous ownership of it. The situation deteriorates quickly and China begins to fortify its northern provinces in anticipation of armed conflict with Russia. Russia, already countering the PLA in mainland China, calls to the United States to retake Skira from the Chinese. Bound by treaty arrangements made after the end of the Cold War, America agrees and the two biggest armies in the world begin to clash on the island.

=== Setting ===
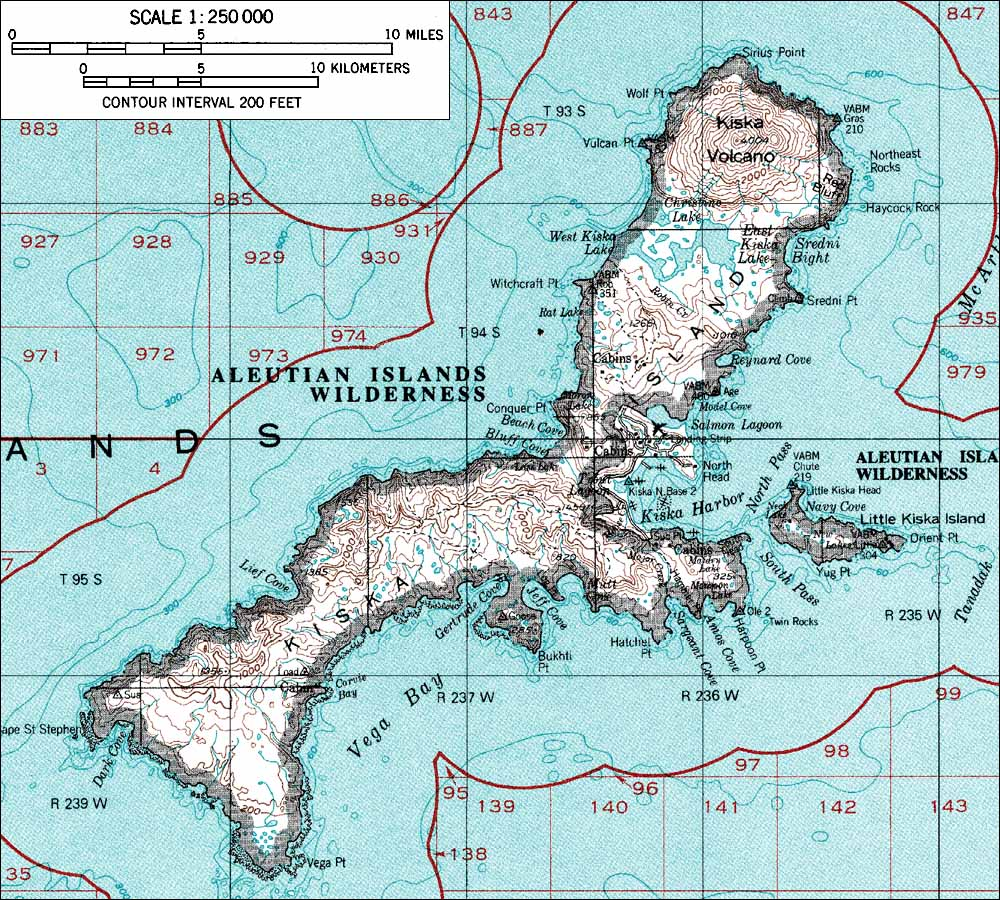
Skira is based directly on Kiska Island, Alaska.

The real-world island of Kiska (on which the in-game island of Skira is directly based) is located on the western end of the Aleutian Islands, Alaska and was involved in World War II. It was at one point liberated by US and Canadian forces after capture by Japanese forces. The developers have aimed to copy the 277.698 km^{2} (107.220 sq mi) accurately to give players a sandbox composed of natural terrain, instead of artificially designed or procedurally generated terrain.

Skira is a volcanic island with a variety of terrain. At one end is a stratovolcano, 8.5 by 6.4 km (5.3 by 4.0 mi) in diameter at its base and 1,221 m (4,006 ft) high, and at the base of the volcano is a section of low lake lands. A ridge of 1,000+ foot mountains runs down one side of the western portion of the island while the other side is generally flatter with numerous lakes and small waterways.

Skira is sparsely populated with some towns and more isolated houses and settlements. An interview with developers suggested that the civilians have all been evacuated ahead of the arrival of US forces.

=== Multiplayer ===
Dragon Rising also features a multiplayer mode. In storyline co-op mode, up to four human players can play through the single player campaign together, each human player replacing a computer-controlled character. The player versus player multiplayer includes four maps to choose from on the disk. There are also the pure multiplayer modes Annihilation and Infiltration, with more multiplayer modes promised for after the release of the main game. The game does not feature dedicated servers, and the official servers are still online though sources claim otherwise.

=== Weapons, vehicles and characters ===
According to Game Informer, there are over 70 weapons in game, all supported by a realistic ballistics system, although most are not readily accessible to the player. The weapons available range from pistols and submachine guns to artillery and large bombs. Depending on the current mission, they are equipped with optics, grenade launchers, laser sights or suppressors. The ballistics system, which simulates the effects of each weapon on buildings, vehicles, and people, is based as much as possible on the real specifications of each weapon (information on Chinese PLA weapons and vehicles is limited in some cases) and also takes into account flight times and effective ranges for each projectile. The balance of the weapons was not arbitrarily created by the game developers, but was based on information provided by real life weapons designers. Learning the best usage of each of these weapons was intended to be a significant part of the challenge of the game.

The player can play as two different characters: 2nd Lieutenant Mulholland and Sergeant Hunter.

=== Difficulty levels ===
Operation Flashpoint: Dragon Rising has a scalable HUD. On easier difficulty modes extra information is provided to the players above what they can see. In Hardcore Mode, however, the entire HUD is stripped away and only character speech is shown on screen.

Difficulty levels are differentiated by the visual information given to the player. At the easiest level, standard FPS information is given to the player about weapons, ammunition, squad health, and compass direction via a HUD. Additionally the location of enemies who have been spotted by the player's squad is indicated at the lowest level. Higher levels of difficulty remove this information until none is left on screen. Ammunition must be remembered as well as the health of the squad. Locations of enemies must be determined by listening to AI squad mates and using other visual cues like the direction they are firing. At high difficulties visual effects become more important, particularly at long range where smoke or dust can help to identify areas which are dangerous. At any difficulty level the player may be killed by a single shot. The highest difficulty removes the game's checkpoint system entirely, meaning death results in starting the level again.

=== Unlockable missions ===
In addition to its standard campaign and modes, Operation Flashpoint: Dragon Rising has seven bonus missions that can be unlocked by using codes. Originally, codes to unlock two missions (Encampment, Debris Field) could be obtained through the Operation Flashpoint: Dragon Rising Recruit website and remaining five unlock codes were received by pre-order customers, however all seven codes are available today as of 2026.

== Development ==
Dragon Rising uses a version of Codemasters' EGO Engine, shared with a number of Codemasters' racing games. The engine has been designed to support Dragon Rising's wide, open spaces and 35 km (22 mi) draw distances.

The game features both night vision and thermal imaging effects, real-time weather, lighting and shadow effects, 5.1 and 7.1 surround sound support. Other effects include realistic ballistics and limb disattachment. Weapon attachments, a medic system, and swimming are also featured.

=== Mission editor ===
The PC version of the game has a mission editor, which allows players to create their own missions for single player, multiplayer and cooperative game modes. The editor is real time, meaning no pre-render of the work is needed, users press a key and can drop into the mission 'live' to test out or play. The editor supports many features including time of day, visual effects, dynamic weather and Lua scripting.

=== Downloadable content ===
The main release of Dragon Rising was followed by two downloadable content expansion packs, both containing multiplayer game modes. "Skirmish" was released on 5 November 2009, for the PC, with Xbox 360 and PS3 versions following at later dates.

On 16 February 2010, Codemasters Community Manager 'Helios' announced that development of Operation Flashpoint: Dragon Rising content had ceased.

== Reception ==
Reception

Aggregate score
Aggregator	Score
Metacritic	(X360) 77/100 (PS3) 76/100 (PC) 76/100

Review scores
Publication	Score
Eurogamer	7/10
GameSpot	7.5/10
GameTrailers	7.1/10
IGN	7.8/10
Official Xbox Magazine (US)	8/10
VideoGamer.com	7/10
X-Play	3/5
Bit-tech	5/10
Games Xtreme	8.5/10
GamingUnion.net	8/10

The game received "generally favorable" reviews, according to video game review aggregator platform Metacritic.

Bit-tech described it as "a schizophrenic design built over a bland world" and described the environment as "an imagination wasteland".

GameSpot said "This tactical military shooter delivers tense and engaging action, competently completing its objective in the face of AI blunders and occasional bugs." However, GameSpot did note the generally intelligent AI enemies and allies alike, saying that the squadmates are "more of an asset than a liability", and that the enemies make you "feel threatened," and are like "battle-hardened, intelligent soldiers."

IGN described the game as unique, fun, and challenging, but unpolished. Despite "consistent issues due to weak AI," they said the AI was decent, and "not awful." Praise was also given to the details and graphics of the PC version.

However, some reviewers found that the game "lacked polish," and that despite many finding that they "wanted to like it," it simply did not live up to expectations. IGN stated that the game should not have been released on consoles as it feels and plays like a PC-only experience.

== Sequel ==
The sequel, Operation Flashpoint: Red River was released for the Xbox 360, PS3 and PC.
