= Operation Flashpoint =

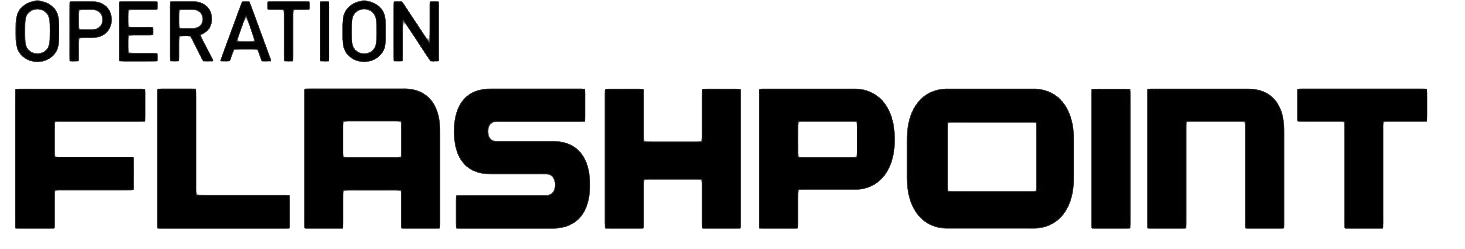
- Logo since 2011
- Genres: Military simulation, tactical shooter
- Developers: Bohemia Interactive; Codemasters
- Publisher: Codemasters
- Platforms: Microsoft Windows; PlayStation 3; Xbox; Xbox 360; OS X; Linux
- First release: Operation Flashpoint: Cold War Crisis; 2001
- Latest release: Operation Flashpoint: Red River; 2011

Operation Flashpoint is a series of military simulation games. The first game, Operation Flashpoint: Cold War Crisis and its expansions Operation Flashpoint: Red Hammer and Operation Flashpoint: Resistance, were developed by Bohemia Interactive Studio. The second games, comprising Operation Flashpoint: Dragon Rising and Operation Flashpoint: Red River, were developed by Codemasters. There is also a spiritual sequel series to the original game made by Bohemia Interactive Studio, Arma.

== Bohemia Interactive series ==
=== Operation Flashpoint: Cold War Crisis (2001) ===
Operation Flashpoint: Cold War Crisis's (also Arma: Cold War Assault) gameplay varies significantly depending on the player's role, but the game is best described as a tactical shooter with significant vehicle elements and minor real-time tactic elements. Set in 1985, the game takes place on the island-states of Everon and Malden, and later in the game, on the barren Russian island of Kolgujev which is the staging point for the renegade Russian forces invading Everon and Malden. It has been re-released as Arma: Cold War Assault in 2011.

==== Operation Flashpoint: Red Hammer (2002) ====
An expansion, Red Hammer, which was developed by Codemasters, depicts the same conflict as Cold War Crisis, but places the player in the role of a Russian soldier, Dmitriy Lukin, rather than an American soldier.

==== Operation Flashpoint: Resistance (2002) ====
Resistance, an expansion, included updated graphics, sounds, and multiplayer mechanics. The storyline takes place three years before the events of the original game storyline. The player takes on the role of an ex-Special Operations soldier, Victor Troska, who has returned to his homeland of Nogova after years in exile serving with British Special Forces. During the first introductory mission to the campaign, the island is invaded by the Soviet Union after some members of the socialist party betray the country and invite Soviet forces to overthrow the government. Troska becomes the leader of a resistance movement against the Soviet Army.

== Codemasters series ==
=== Operation Flashpoint: Dragon Rising (2009) ===
Dragon Rising takes place on a fictional island named Skira, in May 2011. After the global economic crisis causes mass unemployment and political destabilization in China, the PLA seize control of Skira and the vast, newly discovered reservoir of oil there, from the Russian Federation. Peace talks prove useless as both combatants lay claim to Skira due to previous ownership of it. The situation deteriorates quickly and China begins to fortify its northern provinces in anticipation of armed conflict with Russia. Russia, already countering the PLA in mainland China, calls to the United States of America to retake Skira from the Chinese. Bound by treaty arrangements made after the end of the Cold War, America agrees and the two biggest armies in the world begin to clash on the island. Dragon Rising was released for both PC and consoles, with the PC version including map editors and larger multiplayer games.

Bohemia Interactive disputed that Codemasters had made the true Operation Flashpoint sequel because although Codemasters owned the publishing rights to the Operation Flashpoint name, they did not own the publishing rights to any of the intellectual property in the game which was all owned by Bohemia Interactive. Bohemia Interactive had already started their own spiritual sequel to Operation Flashpoint with the Arma series in 2006.

=== Operation Flashpoint: Red River (2011) ===
Operation Flashpoint: Red River was released in 2011 as a sequel to 2009's Dragon Rising. The game's plot concerns a fictional conflict in Tajikistan. The game follows a platoon of Marines, with the player controlling Kirby, Bravo fireteam leader.
