= Arma Tactics =

2013 video game

- Developer: Bohemia Interactive (Note: Actually developed by Centauri Production but released under Bohemia Interactive brand)
- Publisher: Bohemia Interactive
- Series: Arma
- Engine: Unity
- Platforms: Nvidia Shield, selected Android Tegra3 and Tegra4 phones and tablets, Microsoft Windows, Linux, Mac OS X, iOS
- Release: WW: May 2013; WW: October 1, 2013 (Stream)
- Genre: Turn-based tactics
- Mode: Single-player

Arma Tactics (stylized as ARMA TACTICS) is a turn-based tactics video game for mobile devices that run iOS and Android, developed by Bohemia Interactive. The game was released in May 2013 for the Nvidia Shield. Unlike the previous Arma games, this is a turn-based tactical game where the player controls a squad of several so called "operatives".

== Gameplay ==
Arma Tactics is a turn-based strategy game. The player has control of 4 operators with different abilities. There are two game modes, one is the regular campaign and the other user created missions. Score up on experience points to gain operator superiority and add up credits to buy gadgets and upgrades.

== Development ==
As of July 26, 2013 this game will support only Tegra3 and Tegra4 devices a full list is available here. Although, there is a separate version for non-Tegra devices. Currently, the game is supported on Windows, Mac OS X, and Linux in addition to various mobile platforms.

== Reception ==
Reception

Aggregate score
Aggregator	Score
Metacritic	iOS: 60/100; PC: 47/100

Review scores
Publication	Score
4Players	30%
Pocket Gamer	5/10

Arma Tactics received mixed reviews for the iOS version, while the PC version received negative reviews. On Metacritic, the game holds score of 60/100 for the iOS version based on 5 reviews, and 47/100 based on 5 reviews.
