= Operation Flashpoint: Red Hammer =

2002 video game

- Developer: Codemasters
- Publisher: Codemasters
- Series: Operation Flashpoint
- Engine: Real Virtuality
- Platforms: Microsoft Windows; Linux
- Release: WW: 1 February 2002
- Genre: Tactical shooter
- Modes: Single-player; multiplayer

Operation Flashpoint: Red Hammer, also known as Operation Flashpoint: Gold Upgrade (Czech: Operace Flashpoint: Zlatá verze), is an expansion pack to Operation Flashpoint: Cold War Crisis. It was developed by Codemasters.

Red Hammer depicts the same conflict as Operation Flashpoint: Cold War Crisis, but places the player in the role of a Soviet soldier, Dmitri Lukin, rather than a U.S. soldier.

== Plot ==
In the 1980s, Dmitri Lukin, who is one of the few Soviet soldiers stationed on Kolgujev with previous combat experience, takes part in the Soviet invasion of Everon and later in the invasion of NATO-held Malden where the Soviets are pushed back after some initial success. He stays on Malden after a hasty Soviet retreat and manages to bring many Soviet soldiers back to Everon, eventually being sent to Spetsnaz. He leads the defense of Everon and leads the action behind enemy lines, but protests strongly after he is sent to kill the unarmed civilians. It is then revealed that Lukin had been a Spetsnaz operative in Afghanistan previously but was demoted to private for not obeying the orders and shipped to the regular army for insubordination. He is then sent to kill one of the resistance leaders and surprisingly discovers that he is a Spetsnaz deserter who didn't want to serve under general Guba any more, claiming that Guba is a rogue general pursuing his own agenda independently from the Soviet Union. Lukin then switches sides and joins the resistance, ending the mission by arresting the remaining commanders still loyal to Guba.

== Content ==
There are a few new vehicles added, including the AH-64 Apache, Bell OH-58 Kiowa, BMP-2, BRDM and M2A2 Bradley. Additionally some extra weapons such as the G36 and the Steyr AUG were added too.

A strategy guide was also included with original copies of the expansion.

== Reception ==
Red Hammer has received mostly positive reviews from critics.

Games.cz gave Red Hammer 5 points of 10, stating that Red Hammer should have been released as a free addon and not as an expansion. It criticised unduly difficulty of missions and the story. Another critical point was lack of new content besides new missions. Games.cz praised technical treatment of missions.

Jeuxvideo gave 14 points of 20. It praised diverse types of missions and high difficulty. On the other hand, it criticised a lack of improvements over the original game.

Bonusweb praised the opportunity to play for the other side of conflict which brings new dimension to gameplay. It praised the high difficulty and design of the new campaign.

Gamekult praised the new campaign to be exciting and challenging. It also praised patches that were included in the expansion.
