= Arma: Armed Assault =

2006 video game

- Developer: Bohemia Interactive
- Publishers: 505 Games; Atari
- Director: Marek Španěl
- Programmer: Ondřej Španěl
- Artist: Petr Víšek
- Composer: Ondřej Matějka
- Series: Arma
- Engine: Real Virtuality
- Platform: Microsoft Windows
- Release: CZE: November 10, 2006; UK: February 16, 2007; EU: February 23, 2007; AU: March 8, 2007; NA: May 4, 2007
- Genre: Tactical shooter
- Modes: Single-player, multiplayer

Arma: Armed Assault (titled Arma: Combat Operations in North America) is a 2006 tactical shooter simulation video game developed by Bohemia Interactive and published by 505 Games in Europe and Atari in North America for Microsoft Windows. It is the first installment in the Arma series and is a spiritual successor to the 2001 video game Operation Flashpoint: Cold War Crisis, which was also developed by Bohemia. Set on the fictional Atlantic island of Sahrani, the game follows United States Armed Forces military advisors as they are caught in the midst of a conflict between the two rivalling nations on the island.

Arma was developed after an internal falling-out between Bohemia and Operation Flashpoint publisher Codemasters in 2005 led to the two studios cutting ties; as Codemasters retained the rights to the Operation Flashpoint name, Bohemia named their follow-up title Arma. The game uses a similar game engine to Operation Flashpoint's Xbox port Operation Flashpoint: Elite, albeit with improved graphics, physics, multiplayer functionality, and scripting capabilities.

Arma was released on November 10, 2006 in the Czech Republic, with further releases in other regions throughout 2007, to generally positive reception from critics, who highlighted its dedication to realism and accuracy but criticized its difficulty and bugs. An expansion pack, Arma: Queen's Gambit, was released in 2007, while a real-time strategy multiplayer mode, Arma Warfare, was released in 2008. A sequel, Arma 2, was released in 2009.

== Gameplay ==
The multiplayer aspect of the game features a "Join in Progress" option, so that players can play without waiting. The number of people allowed in a multiplayer game is limited only by the server's capability. NPCs are also available in multiplayer missions, both as allies and enemies, while the mission editor allows users to script battle scenarios. A cooperative mode of gameplay is also included, allowing players online to complete the single player missions as a human player squad. The Armed Assault community also creates custom content such as new missions, campaigns, factions and weapons.

An in-game screenshot demonstrating the high draw distance, making long range engagements up to 10 kilometres possible

A multiplayer mode that blends FPS and RTS elements was released as Arma Warfare in official update 1.14. Arma Warfare contains team-based multiplayer missions with real-time strategy. Two sides fight for control of the entire map or destruction of the enemy base. Players must capture whole cities to gain resources that can be channeled into manufacturing even more weapons, units and cars.

The campaign follows a linear storyline. However, each level in the campaign has options for the player on how to progress through the mission. The player's in-game performance and choices determine how the storyline progresses and ultimately will have a bearing on the war itself. For example, a mission to seize a crucial town can have a substantial effect on the story depending on the player's level of success or failure. Failure to successfully complete an objective does not result in the game ending but will affect the storyline. Hostile squads act independently of the player's actions so that they may be engaging in an activity dictated by the game A.I. that does not necessarily involve the player. This implies that the game has high replay value as no two games will be identical.

== Plot ==
A map of the 98 km^{2}-large Sahrani Island

The campaign in Armed Assault is narrated by Private First Class William Porter of the United States Army (voiced by Todd Kramer), and takes place on the fictional Atlantic island of Sahrani, an island nation which is divided in two, with the northern section a Communist nation called the Democratic Republic of Sahrani (DRS) and the southern one an oil-rich monarchy called the Kingdom of South Sahrani. The narrative begins when American forces, after a few months of training the South Sahrani military, begin to depart the island. Prime Minister Torez, leader of the DRS, uses this moment of perceived weakness to launch a full-scale invasion of South Sahrani. The player takes on the role of an American soldier in one of the U.S. Army platoons not yet rotated off the island before the conflict began. The few U.S. Army platoons remaining on the island aid the Royal Army Corps of Sahrani (RACS), the South Sahrani military, in fending off the more powerful northern neighbor's offensive, being spearheaded by the North Sahrani military, with the Sahrani Liberation Army (SLA) at the forefront. While the SLA offensive is successful at first, U.S. Army manages to halt the offensive and starts driving the occupying forces from the southern part of the island with plans to topple the regime on the north.

== Expansion ==
Arma's expansion pack, Arma: Queen's Gambit (also known as Royal Flush in the USA), was released on September 28, 2007 and contained a followup to the original storyline and added a second event afterward.

== Reception ==
Reception

Aggregate scores
Aggregator	Score
GameRankings	73.41%
Metacritic	74/100

Review scores
Publication	Score
1Up.com	C+
Computer and Video Games	8.4/10
Edge	5/10
Eurogamer	8/10
GameSpot	7.0/10
GameSpy	3/5
GameZone	7.4/10
IGN	7.3/10
PC Gamer (UK)	7/10
PC Gamer (US)	78%

Arma received average reception on its release, praised for the unique believability of its action but criticized for its difficulty, complexity, and bugs. IGN said "Arma's adherence to realism and accuracy in terms of weapons and world design is highly commendable and hopefully will inspire other developers in similar directions." GameDaily praised its "spectacular graphics" and its multiplayer, but criticized its bugs and "complicated menu system". Computer Games Online said "It's hard...to believe that they actually thought that such an unpolished game would enjoy any kind of success."

The game has sold 300,000 units as of 28 February 2008. By 2010, sales has surpassed 400,000 copies.Generally Arma is celebrated as a tactical shooter and strategy video game.

== Sequel ==
Arma's sequel, Arma 2, was released in June 2009.
