= Arma (series) =

Video game series

- Genres: Military simulation, tactical shooter
- Developer: Bohemia Interactive
- Publisher: Bohemia Interactive
- Platforms: Microsoft Windows; Xbox Series X/S; Linux; Android iOS; PlayStation 5
- First release: Arma: Armed Assault; November 10, 2006
- Latest release: Arma Reforger; May 17, 2022

Arma (sometimes stylized as ArmA) is a series of first- and third-person military tactical shooters developed by Czech game developer Bohemia Interactive and originally released for Microsoft Windows. The series centers around realistic depictions of modern warfare (2026's cold-war era to speculative near-future settings) from various perspectives. Combined arms warfare is depicted, and while the series primarily focuses on infantry, the games have a wide selection of usable vehicles, including combat vehicles, armored fighting vehicles, military helicopters, multirole combat aircraft, motorboats, and civilian passenger vehicles. Arma was originally conceived as a spiritual successor to Operation Flashpoint: Cold War Crisis after Bohemia Interactive lost the intellectual rights to the series. The first installment was released in 2006 and the most recent in 2022.

== History ==
Release timeline Main series in bold
2006	**Arma: Armed Assault**
2007	Arma: Queen's Gambit
2008
2009	**Arma 2**
2010	Arma 2: Operation Arrowhead
2010	Arma 2: British Armed Forces
2010	Arma 2: Private Military Company
2011	Arma: Cold War Assault
2011	Arma 2: Firing Range
2012	Arma 2: Army of the Czech Republic
2013	Arma Tactics
2013	**Arma 3**
2014	Arma 3: Zeus
2014	Arma 3: Karts
2014	Arma 3: Helicopters
2015	Arma 3: Marksmen
2016	Arma Mobile Ops
2016	Arma 3: Apex Expansion
2017	Arma 3: Jets
2017	Arma 3: Malden 2035
2017	Arma 3: Laws of War
2017	Arma 3: Tac-Ops Mission Pack
2018	Arma 3: Tanks
2019	Arma 3: Creator DLC: Global Mobilization - Cold War Germany
2019	Arma 3: Contact
2020
2021	Arma 3: Creator DLC: SOG - Prairie Fire
2021	Arma 3: Creator DLC: Western Sahara
2022	**Arma Reforger**
2023	Arma 3: Creator DLC: Spearhead 1944
2024	Arma 3: Creator DLC: Reaction Forces

Aggregate review scores
Game	Year	Metacritic
Operation Flashpoint: Cold War Crisis	2001	85/100
ARMA: Armed Assault	2006	74/100
ARMA: Queen's Gambit	2007	67/100
ARMA 2	2009	77/100
ARMA 2: Operation Arrowhead	2010	73/100
ARMA Tactics	2013	IOS: 60/100; PC: 47/100
ARMA 3	2013	74/100
Arma Mobile Ops	2016	
Arma Reforger	2022	

=== Arma: Armed Assault ===
Arma: Armed Assault, known as Arma: Combat Operations in the United States, is the first Arma installment, released for Microsoft Windows in November 2006 (Czech Republic/Germany), February 2007 (Europe) and May 2007 (U.S.) using the Real Virtuality 2 game engine.

==== Arma: Queen's Gambit ====
Queen's Gambit is downloadable content for Armed Assault; it was released in September 2007 (Europe) using the Real Virtuality game engine.

=== Arma 2 ===
Arma 2 is the second full Arma installment, released for Microsoft Windows and released in June 2009 using the Real Virtuality game engine. The mod DayZ was released on this title, which requires the other standalone title Operation Arrowhead.

==== Arma 2: Reinforcements ====
Reinforcements is a standalone expansion of the original Arma 2. It includes the downloadable content Arma 2: British Armed Forces and Arma 2: Private Military Company which can be purchased for any standalone Arma 2 title.

=== Arma 2: Operation Arrowhead ===
Arma 2: Operation Arrowhead is a standalone installment for Microsoft Windows, released in June 2010 with the Real Virtuality 3 game engine.

=== Arma: Cold War Assault ===
In June 2011, Bohemia Interactive re-released Operation Flashpoint as Arma: Cold War Assault, as Codemasters retain the rights to the Operation Flashpoint trademark. Owners of Operation Flashpoint: Cold War Crisis and the Game of the Year Edition may download and install the latest patch for free, and the game is available for purchase via a number of digital distribution channels. This release does not include the Red Hammer expansion, which was developed by Codemasters. The game uses the Real Virtuality game engine.

=== Arma 2: Firing Range ===
Arma 2: Firing Range is a standalone for Android and iOS and was released in July 2011.

=== Arma Tactics ===
Arma Tactics is a standalone installment for Nvidia Shield and other Android devices with Nvidia Tegra3 and Tegra4. It was released in May 2013 using the Unity game engine.

=== Arma 3 ===
Arma 3 is a standalone installment for Microsoft Windows, released on September 12, 2013, using the Real Virtuality 4 game engine. It was first open to the public on March 5 using Steam's Early Access program. In 2015 and 2016 it was also released for MacOS and Linux.

=== Arma Mobile Ops ===
Arma Mobile Ops is a standalone installment for Android and iOS. It was released in June 2016.

=== Arma Reforger ===
Arma Reforger is a standalone game released in 2022 into early access for Microsoft Windows and Xbox Series X/S. It received its 1.0 release in November 2023. It received PlayStation 5 release in December 2024. Set on the island of Everon (from Operation Flashpoint: Cold War Crisis), Arma Reforger follows a "Cold War gone hot" conflict between the United States, the Soviet Union, and Everon-based rebels. The name alludes to the REFORGER maneuver.

=== Arma 4 ===
Arma 4 is an upcoming installment for Microsoft Windows, PlayStation 5 and Xbox Series X/S. It was announced on May 17, 2022. On October 16, 2024, the game was given a release date of 2027 during the Bohemia Interactive 25th Anniversary Concert.
