= Operation Flashpoint: Cold War Crisis =

2001 video game

- Developer: Bohemia Interactive Studio
- Publisher: Codemasters
- Director: Marek Španěl
- Composer: Ondřej Matějka
- Series: Operation Flashpoint; Arma
- Platforms: Windows, Xbox, Linux, macOS
- Release: Windows; AU: June 21, 2001; EU: June 22, 2001; NA: August 30, 2001; Xbox; PAL: October 28, 2005; NA: November 8, 2005; TW: August 31, 2005; Linux, macOS; WW: March 14, 2017
- Genre: Tactical shooter
- Modes: Single-player, multiplayer

Operation Flashpoint: Cold War Crisis (Czech: Operace Flashpoint) is a 2001 tactical shooter simulation video game developed by Bohemia Interactive Studio and published by Codemasters. Set during the Cold War in 1985, the game follows United States Armed Forces personnel in various combined arms roles as they combat a rogue Soviet Armed Forces field army invading the fictional island countries of Everon and Malden.

Operation Flashpoint was released on June 22, 2001 in Europe and August 30, 2001 in North America to positive reviews from critics, who praised its realistic gameplay and depiction of modern warfare. The game was ported to the Xbox in October 2005 as Operation Flashpoint: Elite. Two expansion packs, Operation Flashpoint: Red Hammer and Operation Flashpoint: Resistance, were released in February and June 2002 respectively and follow differing perspectives surrounding the conflict on Malden and others on nearby islands.

In 2005, developer Bohemia Interactive split from publisher Codemasters following an internal falling-out, with the former losing the rights to the Operation Flashpoint name. Operation Flashpoint: Cold War Crisis thus has two sequels under two different series: Arma: Armed Assault, a spiritual successor released in 2006 by Bohemia Interactive; and Operation Flashpoint: Dragon Rising, a direct sequel released in 2009 by Codemasters. In 2011, Bohemia Interactive rereleased the game as Arma: Cold War Assault, establishing it as part of their Arma series and distributing it for free to owners of the original Operation Flashpoint. In June 2026, Bohemia Interactive released the source code of the game under the GNU General Public License on Github.

== Gameplay ==
An in-game screenshot of American infantry advancing on a Soviet position

Operation Flashpoint's gameplay varies significantly depending on the player's role, but the game is best described as a tactical shooter with significant vehicle elements and minor real-time tactics elements. OFP's gameplay is largely team-oriented and the player spends much of the game with a squad of up to 11 computer-controlled members, either as a member of the squad or as its squad leader. On-foot gameplay and the vehicle elements are blended seamlessly and the player can get into any available vehicle at any time, orders and mission conditions permitting. Whether on foot or in a vehicle the player can view the action from both first- and third-person views, as well as an additional "command view" available to squad leaders that provides a limited bird's-eye view of the surrounding area.

At the start of each mission the player is presented with a briefing explaining the situation, describing the player's goals in the mission and, often, providing further information in the form of notes. Once in-game the player is provided with a map, compass, watch, and a notebook. Depending on the mission the player may be required to participate in and complete a variety of tasks, from simply driving a truck or guarding bases to attacking or defending various objectives, patrols, reconnaissance and sabotage behind enemy lines, air support, or any combination of these and more.

When the player is given command of a squad of NPCs, the game becomes more strategy-oriented. As a leader the player is responsible for guiding the squad to its objectives and is able to issue a wide variety of orders to men under their command, such as movement orders, designation of priority targets, formation orders and various other tactical instructions governing how they should behave such as holding fire or attacking only select targets.

=== Equipment ===
Operation Flashpoint features a wide variety of Cold War-era equipment, all of which can be used by the player, depending on availability in any given mission. Available firearms range from standard-issue military assault rifles such as the M16A2 and the AK-74, machine guns, and more specialized weaponry such as sniper rifles and suppressed submachine guns, all of which have iron sights or telescopic sights that the player can use to aim.

Available vehicles include wheeled vehicles (such as jeeps and trucks), patrol boats, tanks and APCs, helicopters and fixed-wing aircraft such as the A-10 Thunderbolt II. If a vehicle is accessible to the player, they can take the position of driver or simply ride in the vehicle as a passenger. Many vehicles, such as tanks, require a crew of at least a driver and a gunner to be used effectively. All vehicles have accurately modeled 3D interiors.

Operation Flashpoint pioneered the use of realistic vehicle and aircraft combat in first-person shooter games. While Operation Flashpoint does not provide the same level of vehicle realism as a dedicated simulator like Steel Beasts or Falcon 4.0, it is nevertheless notable because it does not only simulate aircraft, tank and infantry combat with consistently high levels of realism, but also accurately simulates the complex combined arms relationships between these elements in warfare.

Operation Flashpoint includes an in-game mission editor which can be used to create missions and campaigns.

=== Multiplayer ===
Multiplayer was available through GameSpy until the termination of their master server in July 2014. Multiplayer is now only possible through the third-party application "OFP-Monitor". For the Xbox, multiplayer for Operation Flashpoint Elite was available through Xbox Live until it was shut down on April 15, 2010. The game is now playable online using replacement online servers for the Xbox called Insignia.

Multiplayer missions are not limited any specific mode, with the mission editor instead allowing mission creators to set their own mission parameters. The most common modes include:

- Deathmatch – Players battle each other to earn the most kills and points.
- Team Deathmatch – Players, split into two teams, battle to earn the most kills and points.
- Capture The Flag – Players must steal their enemy's flag and bring it back to their own base.
- Cooperative – Players work together to complete a mission, fighting against computer-controlled enemies.

== Synopsis ==
=== Setting ===
Operation Flashpoint is set in 1985 on an archipelago in the Atlantic Ocean consisting of four major islands: Everon, a microstate that houses a NATO training camp but otherwise tries to remain neutral in the Cold War; Malden, a neighboring microstate housing a NATO garrison; Kolgujev (Not to be confused with the real life Kolguyev Island), a barren island part of Russia where Soviet military units are regularly stationed; and Nogova, a country near Everon and Malden that is invaded by Soviet forces in 1982 in a political crisis mirroring the 1968 Warsaw Pact invasion of Czechoslovakia.

The game's story is told through three campaigns: Cold War Crisis, Red Hammer, and Resistance. The events of Cold War Crisis and Resistance are considered canon in both the Operation Flashpoint and Arma series, but the events of Red Hammer are not considered canon in the Arma series due to Bohemia lacking legal rights to the expansion's assets.

=== Cold War Crisis ===
In May 1985, new Soviet General Secretary Mikhail Gorbachev's glasnost and perestroika reforms are welcomed by Western governments but rejected by Communist Party hardliners. One such hardliner, General Aleksei Vasilii Guba, orders his 3rd Army on Kolgujev to invade Everon and Malden, with the goal of discrediting Gorbachev's administration and forming an anti-Western government with Guba at its helm. Soviet forces under Guba land on Everon and defeat the Everon Freedom Alliance militia, crushing opposition and cutting the island's communications.

During a training exercise on Malden, United States Army Colonel Caper Blake, commander of NATO forces in the region, becomes suspicious of the sudden loss of contact with Everon and dispatches a squad of soldiers to investigate, one of which being infantryman Corporal David Armstrong. When Armstrong's squad comes under fire from Soviet forces, Blake authorizes the deployment of additional NATO units, who manage to push deep into Everon; however, after seizing the city of Montignac, Guba retaliates with a massive counterattack of Soviet troops and combat vehicles who overrun NATO forces and push them out of Everon. Armstrong, the sole survivor of his squad, is captured by the Soviets but is rescued by the Freedom and Independence Army (FIA), a guerilla army formed from the remnants of the Everon Freedom Alliance. After fighting their way through Soviet lines to reach the FIA's base camp, FIA leader Ian Stoyan arranges for Armstrong to return to Malden to seek help from the NATO garrison.

Armstrong returns to Malden, but his superiors refuse to support the FIA. Reassigned as a sentry, Armstrong is attacked by Spetsnaz saboteurs and learns the Soviets are invading Malden. NATO forces elsewhere on Malden, including inexperienced tank commander Lieutenant Robert Hammer, fight back and achieve some victories but are ultimately pushed to the northern coasts of the island. With geopolitical tensions escalating as the West erroneously blames Gorbachev's government for the invasion, Guba contacts Blake with an ultimatum to surrender; however, this reveals his complicity and prompts the Soviet government to condemn his actions, and Blake refuses to surrender when the U.S. government orders a carrier battle group to the region. United States Army Special Forces Major James Gastovski is brought out of retirement to sabotage Soviet materiel, while Armstrong is promoted to lieutenant for his actions in combat against the Soviets, who are eventually forced out of Malden. NATO forces, including helicopter pilot Captain Sam Nichols, launch a counter-invasion of Everon and liberate it with the FIA before shifting their attention to Kolgujev, which Guba's forces are using as a staging area.

When NATO invades Kolgujev, Guba acquires a Scud missile and captures Nichols, by then reassigned from a UH-60 Black Hawk to an A-10 Thunderbolt II, and threatens to fire the Scud and publicly execute Nichols and other prisoners of war to coerce Blake's forces to withdraw. However, Nichols manages to escape, while Gastovski's special forces team acquires the Scud's disarm codes, allowing NATO to destroy it. In a fit of rage, Guba kills his secretary and lover Angelina and orders the preparation of a second Scud for launch, but is captured by Gastovski. While in custody, Guba accidentally reveals the location of the second Scud, which is promptly destroyed by NATO, ending the conflict. With the crisis resolved, the Soviet Union and the West agree to cover up the conflict as a foiled nuclear terrorist attack. In the campaign's epilogue, a fully retired Gastovski returns to Everon to reunite with Armstrong, Hammer, Nichols, and Stoyan, now his friends.

=== Red Hammer ===
In 1980s, Afghanistan veteran Dmitri Lukin takes part of the Soviet invasion of Everon, later in the invasion of NATO-held Malden where Soviet soldiers are pushing back ahead after a few initial success. Lukin leads the defense of Everon and the action behind enemy lines, and he is sent to kill one of leaders of resistance and discovers that he is a Spetsnaz defector and did not want to serve under general Guba anymore. Lukin then defects to the resistance and conducts missions against Guba's forces. After the war, he returns to Russia and rejoins the Spetznaz, the same post he held back in Afghanistan.

=== Resistance ===
In 1982, The Soviet Union invades the fictional island of Nogova, after socialist members of its government take power. Guerilla resistance forces soon establish a small camp at Blackwood Forest. Judge Victor Troska is approached about joining the movement but is initially hesitant to do so, he eventually joins anyway when Soviet troops appear at his house and begin questioning him.

== Reception ==
=== Sales ===
In the United States, Operation Flashpoint sold 230,000 copies and earned $8.8 million by August 2006, after its release in June 2001. It was the country's 90th best-selling computer game during this period. It received a "Silver" sales award from the Entertainment and Leisure Software Publishers Association (ELSPA), indicating sales of at least 100,000 copies in the United Kingdom. The German Entertainment Software Association awarded its Platinum sales award for 200,000 copies sold in German-speaking regions till December 2001. Sales of Operation Flashpoint surpassed 1 million units by 2002, and ultimately topped 2 million copies by 2010.

=== Critical reviews ===
Reception

Aggregate scores
| Aggregator | Score |
|---|---|
| GameRankings | PC: 87% XBOX: 67% |
| Metacritic | PC: 85/100; XBOX: 64/100 |

Review scores
| Publication | Score |
|---|---|
| GameSpot | 5/5 |
| IGN | 5/5 |
| Next Generation | 4/5 |

Awards
| Publication | Award |
|---|---|
| Computer Gaming World | Game of the Year |
| Computer Games Magazine | Best action game of 2001 |

John Leaver reviewed the PC version of the game for Next Generation, rating it four stars out of five, and stated that "This is an extremely realistic sim. Its only major drawback is that the realism sometimes takes precedence over playability, and at times it will bore less-than-hardcore war gamers."

Operation Flashpoint has won critical acclaim for its realism of simulating military conflict situations on PC, even to the extent where the game's technology has been adapted for real soldiers to use as the special combat training application VBS1.

Operation Flashpoint: Cold War Crisis won Computer Gaming World's 2001 "Game of the Year" award. The editors wrote, "Little did we know that somewhere in what used to be Czechoslovakia, Bohemia Interactive was quietly building one of the most revolutionary games that we would ever play." The editors of Computer Games Magazine named Cold War Crisis the best action game of 2001, and wrote, "It doesn't play quite like any other action game out there, and that's a good thing—especially in a game that's this much fun." The magazine also presented Cold War Crisis with its 2001 "Best AI" award.

=== Accolades ===
- PC ZONE Classic Award
- IGN Editors Choice Award
- Gamespy: Best of 2001 (PC Action)
- Computer Gaming World's Editors Choice Award
- The Adrenaline Vault: Seal of Excellence Award
- ECTS winner
- The Wargamer: Award of Excellence
- Gamestar.de Award
- PC Gamer Awards
- COMBATSIM.COM: Best Integrated Battlefield Simulation 2001

== Expansions ==
Throughout 2002, Codemasters released two expansion packs for Operation Flashpoint. They were Operation Flashpoint: Red Hammer, released on February 1, 2002; and Operation Flashpoint: Resistance, released on June 28, 2002. Red Hammer, developed by Codemasters, added the Red Hammer campaign and several new vehicles and game improvements, while Resistance, developed by Bohemia Interactive, added the Resistance campaign, improved graphics, and guerrilla warfare-focused gameplay mechanics.

== Sequels ==
A direct sequel, Operation Flashpoint: Dragon Rising, was released by Codemasters on October 6, 2009. Independently, Operation Flashpoint: Cold War Crisis developer Bohemia Interactive released its own spiritual sequel, Arma: Armed Assault, on November 10, 2006.
