= Central & Eastern European Game Awards =

Annual video game awards

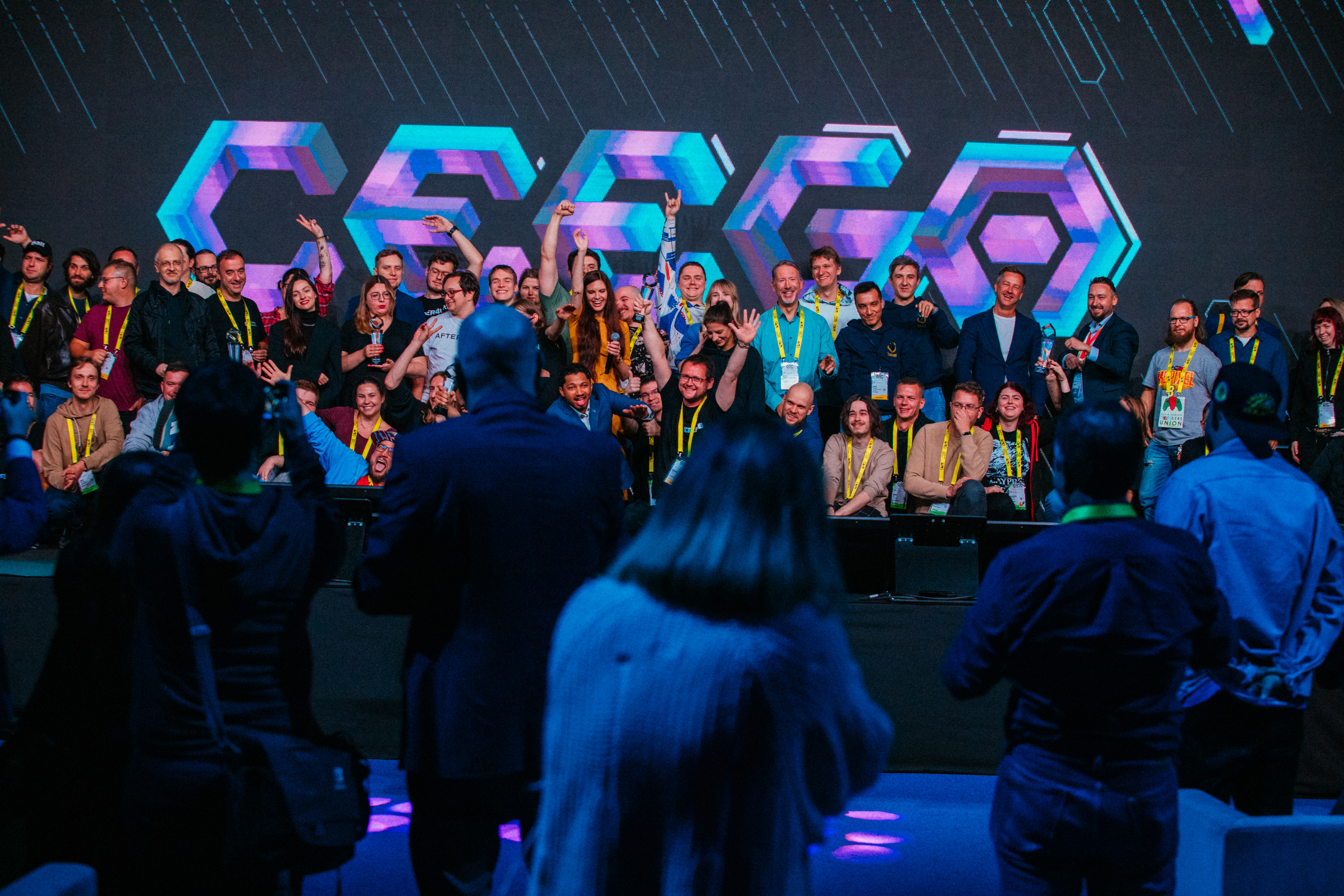
- Awarded for: Best video games from Central and Eastern Europe
- Country: Poland
- First award: 2018
- Website: https://ceega.eu

Central & Eastern European Game Awards (CEEGA) established in 2018, the Central & Eastern European Game Awards was created as a collaborative project between game industry organisations from the Central and Eastern European region to honour the best games produced and released by local studios in the current year. The final gala of the Central & Eastern European Game Awards, during which the winners are awarded CEEGA statuettes, is organised by the Centre for the Development of Creative Industries and is held periodically (annually in autumn) in the Earth Hall of the Poznań International Fair, on the occasion of one of the most popular trade fairs in our part of Europe, the Poznań Game Arena and the accompanying Game Industry Conference.

== 2026 ==
The winners were announced on October 23, 2026.

Best Game	Best Mobile Game
(Belarus) Replaced - Sad Cat Studios; (Poland) Cronos: The New Dawn - Bloober Team; (Poland) Dying Light: The Beast - Techland; (United Kingdom) (Czech Republic) Mafia: The Old Country - Hangar 13	(Hungary) Off the Road 2 - DogByte Games; (Georgia (country)) A Difficult Game About Letters - Giorgi Abelashvili, Elene Abelashvili, Giga Putkaradze; (Slovakia) Highway Heroes: Truck Manager - Pixel Federation; (Ukraine) Unamon: Hero Ranking Survivor - Wowky Games
Hidden Gem	Technology
(Hungary) Don't Sleep with the Fishes - Taiki; (Lithuania) Cat Isle - domkegames, pixelduckoo; Loot Loop - BitBrew; (Czech Republic) (Moldova) TROLEU - andrground	(Poland) Dying Light: The Beast - Techland; (United Kingdom) (Czech Republic) Mafia: The Old Country - Hangar 13; (Belarus) Replaced - Sad Cat Studios; (Ukraine) Ukrainian Fight Drone Simulator - Simtech Solutions
Narrative	Design
(Belarus) Replaced - Sad Cat Studios; (Poland) Cronos: The New Dawn - Bloober Team; (United Kingdom) (Czech Republic) Mafia: The Old Country - Hangar 13; (Serbia) Rue Valley - Emotion Spark Studio	(Belarus) Replaced - Sad Cat Studios; (Lithuania) All Will Fall - All Parts Connected; (Slovenia) Starminer - Cool And Good Games; (Poland) StarRupture - Creepy Jar
Audio	Visual Art
(Poland) Cronos: The New Dawn - Bloober Team; (Poland) Metal Eden - Reikon Games; (Belarus) Replaced - Sad Cat Studios; (Serbia) Rue Valley - Emotion Spark Studio	(Poland) Mouse: P.I. for Hire - Fumi Games; (United Kingdom) (Czech Republic) Mafia: The Old Country - Hangar 13; (Belarus) Replaced - Sad Cat Studios; (Serbia) Rue Valley - Emotion Spark Studio
Code: The Rights - Best Game	Code: The Rights - Special Award
(Czech Republic) Phonopolis - Amanita Design	(Poland) Liberated - Atomic Wolf

== 2025 ==
The winners were announced on October 24, 2025.

Best Game	Best Mobile Game
(Czech Republic) Kingdom Come: Deliverance II - Warhorse Studios; (Ukraine) (Czech Republic) S.T.A.L.K.E.R. 2: Heart of Chornobyl - GSC Game World; (Poland) Silent Hill 2 - Bloober Team; (Poland) The Alters - 11 Bit Studios	(Czech Republic) Playing Prague - Charles Games; (Slovakia) TrainStation 3 - Pixel Federation; (Estonia) Tsikara - Dream Book Games; (Poland) Pup Champs - Afterburn
Hidden Gem	Technology
(Lithuania) Ved - Karaclan	(Ukraine) (Czech Republic) S.T.A.L.K.E.R. 2: Heart of Chornobyl - GSC Game World; (Czech Republic) Kingdom Come: Deliverance II - Warhorse Studios; (Czech Republic) Farming Simulator 25 - GIANTS Software CZ; (Slovakia) The House of Da Vinci VR - Blue Brain Games
Narrative	Design
(Poland) The Alters - 11 Bit Studios; (Czech Republic) Kingdom Come: Deliverance II - Warhorse Studios; (Poland) Tainted Grail: The Fall of Avalon - Questline; (Croatia) Go Home Annie - Misfit Village	(Poland) Frostpunk 2 - 11 Bit Studios; (Czech Republic) Kingdom Come: Deliverance II - Warhorse Studios; (Poland) Witchfire - The Astronauts; (Serbia) The King is Watching - Hypnohead
Audio	Visual Art
(Poland) Silent Hill 2 - Bloober Team; (Czech Republic) Kingdom Come: Deliverance II - Warhorse Studios; (Serbia) Somber Echoes - Rock Pocket Games, Lav Games; (Poland) The Alters - 11 Bit Studios	(Poland) Silent Hill 2 - Bloober Team; (Slovakia) Preserve - Bitmap Galaxy; (Lithuania) Ved - Karaclan; (Croatia) Go Home Annie - Misfit Village
Code: The Rights	Code: The Rights - Human Rights Award
(United Kingdom) Citizen Sleeper 2: Starward Vector - Jump Over the Age	(France) Detroit: Become Human - Quantic Dream

== 2024 ==
The winners were announced on October 26, 2024.

Best Game	Best Mobile Game
(Croatia) Talos Principle - Croteam; (Serbia) Let Bions Be Bygones - Bohemian Pulp; (Serbia) The Cub - Demagog Studio; (Poland) Against the Storm - Eremite Games	(Poland) Raccoon Mania - Sun Storm Studio; (Georgia (country)) Odyssey: Sakutaiso - RERODEV; (Croatia) Swung - ANIQ; (Poland) Hunt Royale: Action RPG Battle - BoomBit Games
Hidden Gem	Technology
(Bulgaria) Death Must Die - Realm Archive; (Slovakia) Felvidek - Jozef Pavelka and Vladimir Ganaj; (Cyprus) I Am Cat - New Folder Games LTD; (Poland) Heading Out - Serious Sim	(Poland) Ghostrunner 2 - One More Level; (Croatia) Talos Principle - Croteam; (Romania) Lords of the Fallen - Hexworks; (Serbia) Let Bions Be Bygones - Bohemian Pulp
Narrative	Design
(Serbia) Let Bions Be Bygones - Bohemian Pulp; (Croatia) Talos Principle - Croteam; (Poland) Nobody Wants to Die - Critical Hit Games; (Czech Republic) Last Train Home - Ashborne Games	(Croatia) Talos Principle - Croteam; (Czech Republic) Last Train Home - Ashborne Games; (Poland) Against the Storm - Eremite Games; (Serbia) The Cub - Demagog Studio
Audio	Visual Art
(Poland) Ghostrunner 2 - One More Level; (Serbia) The Cub - Demagog Studio; (Croatia) Talos Principle' - Croteam; (Serbia) Let Bions Be Bygones - Bohemian Pulp	(Serbia) Let Bions Be Bygones - Bohemian Pulp; (Croatia) Talos Principle - Croteam; (Poland) Nobody Wants to Die - Critical Hit Games; (Poland) Invincible - Starward Industries
Code: The Rights - Nagrodna Główna	Code: The Rights - Nagrodna Specjalna
(Belgium) Baldur's Gate 3 - Larian Studios	(Poland) This War of Mine - 11 Bit Studios

== 2023 ==
The winners were announced on October 7, 2023.

Best Game	Best Mobile Game
(Poland) Hard West 2 – Ice Code Games; (Bulgaria) Jagged Alliance 3 – Haemimont Games; (Serbia) Scorn – Ebb Software; (Ukraine) Sherlock Holmes The Awakened – Frogwares	(Poland) Railbound – Afterburn; (Poland) Creatures of the Deep: Fishing – Infinite Dreams; (Lithuania) Murder By Choice - Nordcurrent Game; (Czech Republic) Šachová hra - Play By Ears
Hidden Gem	Technology
(Poland) Midnight Fight Express - Jacob Dzwinel; (Croatia) Aquatico - Digital Reef Games; (Poland) McPixel 3 - "Sos Sosowski"; (Latvia) The case of the Golden Idol - Color Gray Games	(Poland) Gloria Victis: Medieval MMORPG - Black Eye Games; (Serbia) Scorn - Ebb Software; (Hungary) The Valiant - Kite Games; (Slovakia) Way of The Hunter - Nine Rocks Games
Narrative	Design
(Ukraine) Sherlock Holmes The Awakened – Frogwares; (Poland) Blacktail - THE PARASIGHT; (Croatia) Paws of Coal - Gamechuck; (Czech Republic) The Last Oricru – GoldKnights	(Poland) Hard West 2 – Ice Code Games; (Poland) Contraband Police – Crazy Rocks; (Bulgaria) Jagged Alliance 3 – Haemimont Games; (Latvia) The Case of the Golden Idol – Color Gray Games
Audio	Visual Art
(Poland) Layers of Fear – Anshar Studios, Bloober Team; (Serbia) Scorn – Ebb Software; (Ukraine) Sherlock Holmes The Awakened – Frogwares; (Slovakia) Way of The Hunter - Nine Rocks Games	(Serbia) Scorn – Ebb Software; (Hungary) Circus Electrique - Zen Studios; (Slovakia) Life of Delta – Airo Games; (Serbia) Scars Above - Mad Head Games

== 2022 ==
The winners were announced on October 8, 2022. Dying Light 2 by Techland won the Best Game category.

Best Game	Best Mobile Game
(Poland) Dying Light 2 – Techland; (Czech Republic) Happy Game – Amanita Design; (Hungary) King Arthur: Knight’s Tale – NeocoreGames; (Ukraine) Sherlock Holmes Chapter One – Frogwares	(Poland) Gwent: Rogue Mage – CD Projekt RED; (Hungary) Flåklypa Grand Prix – Ravn Studio, Rock Pocket Games, Invictus Games; (Slovakia) Path of Evil - Tinysoft; (Ukraine) quadline - Ivan Kovalov
Hidden Gem	Technology
(Czech Republic) ArtFormer: Ancient Stories - Jan Šídlo, Adam Hrubý; (Croatia) Eyes in the Dark - Under the Stairs; (Czech Republic) Fixfox - Rendlike; (Serbia) Golf Club Wasteland - Demagog Studio	(Poland) Dying Light 2 - Techland; (Czech Republic) Arma Reforger - Bohemia Interactive; (Hungary) Bean Stalker - VR Storm Studio; (Poland) The Riftbreaker - Exor Studios
Narrative	Design
(Ukraine) Sherlock Holmes Chapter One – Frogwares; (Poland) Best Month Ever - Warsaw Film School Video Game & Film Production Studio; (Poland) Gamedec - Anshar Studios; (Czech Republic) Svoboda 1945: Liberation – Charles Games	(Poland) The Riftbreaker – Exor Studios; (Croatia) Eyes in the Dark – Under the Stairs; (Czech Republic) Fixfox – Rendlike; (Ukraine) Tile Cities – Yevheniy
Audio	Visual Art
(Serbia) Golf Club Wasteland - Demagog Studio; (Poland) Loud – Hyperstrange; (Bulgaria) Moo Lander – The Sixth Hammer; (Ukraine) Sherlock Holmes Chapter One – Frogwares	(Poland) Trek to Yomi – Leonard Menchiari, Flying Wild Hog; (Czech Republic) Happy Game - Amanita Design; (Ukraine) Sherlock Holmes Chapter One – Frogwares; (Poland) Slice of Sea - Mateusz Skutnik

== 2021 ==
Fourth year was held on 22 October 2021. Cyberpunk 2077 won the Best Game award.

Best Game	Best Mobile Game
(Poland) Cyberpunk 2077 – CD Projekt RED; (Poland) Ghostrunner – One More Level; (Czech Republic) Factorio – Wube Software Ltd.; (Ukraine) The Sinking City – Frogwares	(Lithuania) Card Hog - Dungeon Crawler Game – SnoutUp Games; (Poland) The Witcher: Monster Slayer – Spokko; (Croatia) Cats in Time – PINE STUDIO, Pine Studio D.O.O.; (Lithuania) Bricky Boy - Moorland Games
Hidden Gem	Technology
(Poland) Tohu - Fireart Games; (Poland) Papetura - Petums; (Ukraine) Tukoni - Oksana Bula, Alexey Furman, Alexey Sysoiev; (Czech Republic) Hadr - Ateliér Duchů	(Poland) The Medium - Bloober Team; (Poland) Outriders - People Can Fly; (Serbia) Aquanox: Deep Descent - Digital Arrow; (Czech Republic) Factorio - Wube Software Ltd.
Narrative	Design
(Czech Republic) Mafia: Definitive Edition – Hangar 13; (Poland) The Medium - Bloober Team; (Poland) Cyberpunk 2077 - CD Projekt RED; (Czech Republic) Hobo: Tough Life – Perun Creative	(Czech Republic) Factorio – Wube Software Ltd.; (Poland) Ghostrunner – One More Level; (Poland) Cyberpunk 2077 – CD Projekt RED; (Slovakia) YesterMorrow – Bitmap Galaxy
Audio	Visual Art
(Poland) Cyberpunk 2077 - CD Projekt RED; (Romania) Unbound: Worlds Apart – Alien Pixel Studios; (Serbia) Aquanox: Deep Descent – Digital Arrow; (Czech Republic) Mafia: Definitive Edition – Hangar 13	(Poland) Papetura – Petums; (Ukraine) Tukoni - Oksana Bula, Alexey Furman, Alexey Sysoiev; (Romania) Unbound: Worlds Apart – Alien Pixel Studios; (Poland) Cyberpunk 2077 - CD Projekt RED

== 2020 ==
Third year was held on 9 December 2020. Nominations were announced in December 2020. Creaks received the highest number of nominations.

Best Game	Best Mobile Game
(Poland) Blair Witch – Bloober Team; (Czech Republic) Creaks – Amanita Design; (Czech Republic) Someday You'll Return – CBE Software; (Lithuania) Inmost – Hidden Layer Games	(Czech Republic) Pilgrims – Amanita Design; (Slovakia) The House of Da Vinci 2 – Blue Brain Games; (Poland) Poopdie – Bulbware; (Slovakia) Train Station 2 - Pixel Federation
Hidden Gem	Technology
(Ukraine) No One Lives Under the Lighthouse - Sowoke Entertainment Bureau; (Poland) Here Be Dragons - Red Zero Games; (Czech Republic) Ministry of Broadcast - Ministry of Broadcast; (Romania) Yaga - Breadcrumbs Interactive	(Poland) Chernobylite - The Farm 51; (Czech Republic) Shadowgun War Games - Madfinger Games; (Ukraine) This Land is My Land - Game-Labs; (Belarus) Virtual Classroom: Atoms & Orbitals - Iridescent Studio
Narrative	Design
(Poland) Vampire: The Masquerade - Coteries of New York – Draw Distance SA; (Romania) Interrogation: You Will Be Deceived - Critique Gaming; (Czech Republic) Ministry of Broadcast - Ministry of Broadcast; (Czech Republic) Someday You'll Return – CBE Software	(Poland) Carrion – Phobia Game Studio; (Poland) Blair Witch – Bloober Team; (Czech Republic) Creaks – Amanita Design; (Belarus) Rebel Cops – Weappy Studio
Audio	Visual Art
(Romania) Yaga - Breadcrumbs Interactive; (Poland) Carrion – Phobia Game Studio; (Czech Republic) Creaks – Amanita Design; (Serbia) Trial and Terror – Stargazer Studio	(Czech Republic) Creaks – Amanita Design; (Poland) Chernobylite - The Farm 51; (Poland) Liberated – Atomic Wolf, L.INC; (Romania) Yaga - Breadcrumbs Interactive

== 2019 ==
Second year was held on 19 October 2019. Mordhau won the Best Game award.

Best Game	Best Mobile Game
(Slovenia) Mordhau – Triternion; (Poland) Book of Demons - Thing Trunk; (Poland) Green Hell - Creepy Jar; (Belarus) World of Warships: Legends - Wargaming	(Poland) Tanks a Lot - BoomBit; (Poland) Golf Peaks - Afterburn; (Lithuania) Murder in the Alps - Nordcurrent; (Hungary) Pa Pa Land: Head Escape - Invictus Games
Hidden Gem	Technology
(Czech Republic) Feudal Alloy – Attu Games; (Poland) Age of Civilizations II – Łukasz Jakowski; (Bulgaria) Copperbell – Zero Fun; (North Macedonia) WOUNDED – Workbench Entertainment	(Slovakia) Shadows: Awakening – Games Farm; (Czech Republic) Space Engineers – Keen Software House; (Czech Republic) Vigor – Bohemia Interactive; (Belarus) World of Warships: Legends – Wargaming
Narration	Design
(Poland) Thronebreaker: The Witcher Tales – CD Projekt RED; (Slovakia) Blood Will Be Spilled – Doublequote Studio; (Lithuania) Murder in the Alps – Nordcurrent; (Poland) We. The Revolution – Polyslash	(Poland) Book of Demons – Thing Trunk; (Poland) Green Hell – Creepy Jar; (Slovenia) Mordhau – Triternion; (Czech Republic) Space Engineers – Keen Software House
Audio	Visual Art
(Romania) Door Kickers: Action Squad – PixelShard, KillHouse Games; (Poland) Driftland: The Magic Revival – Star Drifters; (Poland) My Brother Rabbit – Artifex Mundi; (Czech Republic) Jets'n'Guns 2 – Rake in Grass	(Slovakia) Blood Will Be Spilled – Doublequote Studio; (Romania) Gibbous - A Cthulhu Adventure – Stuck In Attic; (Poland) World War 3 – The Farm 51; (Serbia) Pagan Online – Mad Head Games
China Choice
(Poland) World War 3 – The Farm 51

== 2018 ==
The first year was held on 13 October 2018. Frostpunk won the Best Game and Best Design awards. Other winners included Kingdom Come: Deliverance for Best Narration, Chuchel for Best Visual Art, and Ruiner for Best Audio.

Best Game	Best Mobile Game
(Poland) Frostpunk – 11 bit studios; (Czech Republic) Chuchel – Amanita Design; (Czech Republic) Kingdom Come: Deliverance – Warhorse Studios; (Belarus) This is the Police 2 – Weappy	(Ukraine) G30 – Ivan Kovalev; (Slovakia) Been There Together – Marian Horkovic; (Czech Republic) Under Leaves – Circus Atos; (Hungary) Wormster Dash – Gamelab
Hidden Gem	Technology
(Czech Republic) Attentat 1942 – Charles University/Czech Academy of Sciences; (Latvia) Dude, Stop – Team HalfBeard; (Croatia) Inked – Somnium Games; (Russia) PUSS! – teamCoil	(Czech Republic) Beat Saber – Beat Games; (Poland) Frostpunk – 11 bit studios; (Czech Republic) Kingdom Come: Deliverance – Warhorse Studios; (Romania) Marble Land – Devious Technologies
Narration	Design
(Czech Republic) Kingdom Come: Deliverance – Warhorse Studios; (Poland) Frostpunk – 11 bit studios; (Romania) Gray Dawn – Interactive Stone; (Belarus) Tardy – One Wing Cicada	(Poland) Frostpunk – 11 bit studios; (Czech Republic) Chuchel – Amanita Design; (Ukraine) G30 – Ivan Kovalev; (Poland) Ruiner – Reikon Games
Audio	Visual Art
(Poland) Ruiner – Reikon Games; (Poland) Ancestors Legacy – Destructive Creations; (Bulgaria) Elea – Kyodai; (Poland) Seven: The Days Long Gone – Fool's Theory	(Czech Republic) Chuchel – Amanita Design; (Poland) Apocalipsis: Harry at the End of the World – Punch Punk Games; (Romania) Gray Dawn – Interactive Stone; (Croatia) Inked – Somnium Games
China Choice
(Poland) Frostpunk – 11 bit studios
