= Railbound =

2022 puzzle video game

- Developer: Afterburn
- Publishers: Afterburn (Note: Android, iOS, macOS, and Windows versions); 7Levels (Note: Nintendo Switch, Xbox One, and Xbox Series X/S versions)
- Engine: Unity
- Platforms: Android; iOS; macOS; Windows; Nintendo Switch; Xbox One; Xbox Series X/S
- Release: Android, iOS, macOS, Win; 6 September 2022; Nintendo Switch; 1 December 2022; Xbox One, Xbox Series X/S; 31 May 2023
- Genre: Puzzle
- Mode: Single-player

Railbound is a 2022 puzzle video game developed by Polish indie developer Afterburn. It was released on Windows, macOS, Android, and iOS in September 2022 by Afterburn, then later released on consoles by publisher 7Levels, to Nintendo Switch in December 2022 and Xbox One and Xbox Series X and Series S in May 2023.

The game received generally favorable reviews and won the 2023 Apple Design Award for interaction.

== Gameplay ==
The two train carriages, numbered 1 and 2, are brought in order behind the locomotive in the top right. Two world-specific mechanics, train tunnels and junction switches, are depicted.

Railbound is a puzzle game themed around trains featuring two canine protagonists. In each level, the player is presented an isometric view 2D grid with train tracks, one to four train carriages, and other elements. The player uses a tap-and-drag system to place tracks on unoccupied spaces in the grid, and is given a limited set of tracks per level. Tracks can be placed in any orientation, and can be placed to go straight, turn, or branch. The goal is to place tracks to guide the carriages, each of which are numbered sequentially, in order, to the back of a steam locomotive.

The game's more than 150 levels are structured into sets of stages called "worlds". Each world introduces a new mechanic, such as tunnels or numbered stations, that affects how carriages must be routed. Later worlds combine previously introduced mechanics. Each world has approximately ten base puzzles that introduce its mechanic and must be completed to move on to the next world, as well as additional optional bonus puzzles.

== Development ==
Afterburn is a Polish indie developer which previously released puzzle games Golf Peaks and inbento. According to studio founder Luke Spierewka, Railbound's gameplay was inspired by Mini Metro and Cosmic Express. Its art style was developed from concepts from studio Vile Monarch, and further influenced by French graphic novels. Developing the game's graphical style took up over half of development time.

The game's divide into base and bonus levels was an attempt to appeal to both experienced and casual players. Many bonus levels were designed as modifications of base levels.

Development began in November 2021, with an initially expected launch in spring 2022. The game was eventually published by Afterburn on 6 September 2022 for Android, iOS, macOS, and Windows. It was published by 7Levels for the Nintendo Switch on 1 December 2022, and for the Xbox One and Xbox Series X and Series S on 31 May 2023.

=== Post-release ===
On 3 February 2023, Railbound's 2.0 update added an additional set of 30 levels and a "semaphores" mechanic. A year after release, the 3.0 update added two additional sets of levels and a "two locomotives" mechanic.

== Reception ==
Reception

Aggregate score
Aggregator	Score
Metacritic	NS: 81/100

Review scores
Publication	Score
Nintendo Life	8/10
Pocket Gamer	3/5
TouchArcade	4/5

Railbound's Nintendo Switch edition received "generally favorable" reviews according to review aggregator Metacritic.

The visual, audio, and interaction design of the game drew praise from reviewers, with most finding that these elements contributed to a cosy, laid-back ambiance. Reviewers cited its comic book-inspired, cel shaded style and warm pastel color palette, describing the art as "cosy", "cute", and "striking". Kotaku generally described the soundtrack as "laid-back", Touch Arcade liked "the little sounds of everything clacking together", and PC Gamer said that "when the piano kicked in in world four I was jazzed". PC Gamer also praised the game's intuitive controls.

The level design and difficulty received mixed feedback. Pocket Gamer found the difficulty frustrating, especially in later levels when mechanics were combined, a problem made worse by skipping optional levels. The divide of the game into core and optional levels was controversial. Rock Paper Shotgun wished that more of the optional levels had been integrated into the core path of the game, criticizing "the game's relentless obsession with ploughing on toward the finish line". Rock Paper Shotgun described it as a "hint system done right", offering small clues to allow the player room to solve the puzzle, and Pocket Gamer said that it increased the ease of solving the puzzles but that "the game doesn't spoonfeed you with its hints". Nintendo Life criticized that the small play area led to many levels having only one solution.

=== Accolades ===
Railbound won the 2023 Apple Design Awards for interaction, based on the simplicity of its tap-and-drag system for placing rails. It also won "Best Mobile Game" at the 2023 Central & Eastern European Game Awards.

=== Sales ===
The game sold 50,000 copies on Steam by July 2023, surpassing its break-even point of around 30,000 copies.
