= Inspector Waffles =

2021 video game

- Developer: Goloso Games
- Publishers: Goloso Games (Windows, macOS, Linux); Hitcents (Nintendo Switch, PlayStation 4)
- Engine: Unity
- Platforms: Windows; macOS; Linux; Nintendo Switch; PlayStation 4
- Release: Windows, macOS, Linux; WW: March 23, 2021 (Steam, GOG); WW: May 4, 2021 (itch.io); Switch, PS4; WW: October 14, 2021
- Genre: Point-and-click adventure game
- Mode: Single-player

Inspector Waffles is a 2021 point-and-click adventure game developed by the French solo studio Goloso Games. Set in a world of anthropomorphic animals, it follows the title character, a cat detective, as he investigates the murder of a prominent industrialist in the fictional Cat Town. The game was released for Windows, macOS and Linux in March 2021, first through Steam and GOG and then on Itch.io, before being ported to Nintendo Switch and PlayStation 4 later that year through publisher Hitcents.

Inspector Waffles received generally positive reviews, with critics praising its writing and humor while giving a more mixed reception to its pixel art presentation.

== Gameplay ==
Inspector Waffles is a traditional point-and-click adventure game in which the player controls Inspector Waffles, a cat detective, as he explores locations in Cat Town, collects clues, solves inventory-based puzzles and interrogates suspects to advance a murder-mystery plot centered on the killing of a wealthy industrialist. Reviewers noted that the game's puzzles are pitched to accommodate both newcomers to the genre and players familiar with harder classic adventure-game design.

== Development ==
Inspector Waffles was developed by Goloso Games, a one-person studio founded in 2017 by a French developer working under the name Yann and based in Avignon, France. The character of Inspector Waffles originated as a prototype created in about two weeks for the "My First Game Jam: Winter 2017" event, whose theme was "cats and/or dogs". The finished game features a jazz-influenced soundtrack and hand-drawn pixel art.

== Release ==
Inspector Waffles was released for Windows, macOS and Linux on Steam and GOG on March 23, 2021, followed by a release on Itch.io on May 4, 2021. Hitcents published console ports for Nintendo Switch and PlayStation 4, which were both released on October 14, 2021; a physical PlayStation 4 edition was separately published by Red Art Games.

A prequel, Inspector Waffles: Early Days, was later developed for Game Boy Color and other platforms.

== Reception ==
Inspector Waffles was reviewed positively by critics, who highlighted its writing, characters and mystery plot. GameCritics' Damiano Gerli scored the game 7.5 out of 10, praising its "entertaining and surprisingly deep narrative" and the way its puzzles balance classic adventure-game difficulty against newcomer accessibility, while criticizing its "limited animations and too-simple sprites". Nintendo Life's Kate Gray described it as a story of "murder, mystery, and murder mystery" that placed the game alongside other anthropomorphic-detective titles such as Aviary Attorney and Later Alligator. The Escape Roomer's RussBuilds rated it 4.6 out of 5, praising its "outstanding theming, visuals and a heavy emphasis on fun".

Additional reviews aggregated by OpenCritic included scores of 8 out of 10 from Nindie Spotlight and 8.5 out of 10 from WhatIfGaming.
