= Mark Dodson (actor) =

American voice actor (1960–2024)

- Born: February 1, 1960; St. Louis, Missouri, U.S.
- Died: March 2, 2024 (aged 64); Evansville, Indiana, U.S.
- Occupation: Voice actor
- Years active: 1983–2024
- Notable work: Return of the Jedi, Gremlins
- Children: 1

Mark Dodson (February 1, 1960 – March 2, 2024) was an American voice actor.

== Career ==
Dodson began his career in 1983. He voiced Salacious Crumb in Return of the Jedi, the Ewoks in Ewoks: The Battle for Endor, and Niima Scavenger in Star Wars: The Force Awakens. He also voiced the Mogwai in Gremlins and Gremlins 2: The New Batch, and several zombies in Day of the Dead. Dodson also had voice roles in commercials and video games, including Ghostrunner, Ghostrunner 2, Bendy and the Dark Revival, Lego Star Wars: The Skywalker Saga, Star Trek Online, and Heroes of Newerth.

== Death ==
Dodson died from a heart attack on March 2, 2024, at the age of 64.

== Filmography ==
=== Film ===
Year	Film	Role	Notes
1983	Return of the Jedi	Salacious B. Crumb	
1983	The Christmas That Almost Wasn't	Elves and Storm Cloud	Animated Short Film
1984	Gremlins	Gremlins/Mogwai	
1984	Fitness & Me: Why Exercise?	Sir Sloth, French Dragon, Drools (Voice)	Animated Short Film
1985	Day of the Dead	Zombies	Uncredited
1990	Gremlins 2: The New Batch	Daffy, Lenny, George	
2007	Deadwood Park	Harold Everett	
2013	Atlantis: The Last Days of Kaptara	Aegeus	
2014	Mister... Salacious Crumb?	Salacious B. Crumb	Archive Recordings
2015	Star Wars: The Force Awakens	Niima Scavenger	Uncredited
2016	This Halloween Night	Narrator	Short Film
2017	Small Town Z: The Next Chapter	Narrator and Zombie Sounds	Short Film
2020	Headcheese: The Movie	Bubba, Junior (Voice)	
2022	Toking with the Dead I2 (Misfortune)	Zombie Voices	Short Film
2022	Toking with the Dead I3 Smoked Out	Zombie Voices	
2023	Detectives Don't Sleep	Himself	Narrator of Podcast Series

=== Television ===
Year	Film	Role	Notes
1983	Wishman	Wishman (Voice)	TV Movie
1985	Ewoks: The Battle for Endor	Voice Characterization	TV Movie
1991	Darkwing Duck	Henchmoles	1 episode - (Aduckyphobia)
1993	Bonkers	The Locomotive Kid	1 episode - (Trains, Toons, and Toon Trains)
2009	Bow Madness	Announcer	47 episodes
2009	Natural Born Killers	Narrator	45 episodes
2013	Eddie Salter Turkey Man	Narrator	
2014	Arachnicide	Multiple Voices	TV Movie
2015	Legend of the Superstition Mountains	Narrator	6 episodes - (Secrets of the Lost Map - The Climb)
2020	Machtails from the Cantina	Himself	TV Special
2021	Wandering with the Dead	Donato Almonte	1 episode - (Chapter 3: Oil on Canvas)
2021	Still Toking With...	Himself	1 episode - (Still Toking With Mark Dodson)
2022	Toking with the Dead Reanimated	Zombies	

=== Video Games ===
Year	Game title	Role	Notes
2010	Star Trek Online	Various Roles	Voice Only
2010	Heroes of Newerth	Draconis	
2011	Nancy Drew: Alibi in Ashes	Chief McGinnis	
2012	Awesomenauts	Ghosthouse Announcer	
2012	Nancy Drew: The Deadly Device	Gray Cortwright	
2012	Lucius	Fabius, Michael	Voice Only
2012	Painkiller: Hell & Damnation	Grim Reaper	
2013	Anomaly 2	Soldiers	Voice Only
2015	Lucius II	Devil, Doctor 2, Worker 2, Generic Male 2	Voices Only
2015	Rebel Galaxy	Pirate, Meathook, Stafford, Prospector	
2016	Killing Floor 2	Slasher Zombie	Voice Only
2016	Grim Dawn	Barnabas	
2016	Neon Chrome	Overseer	
2016	Grim Legends 3: The Dark City	Captain Alonzo, Additional Voices	
2016	Enderal: The Shards of Order	Tabaccus	Voice Only
2016	Dragon Front	Narrator, Entropy, Ja'Ru	Voices Only
2016	Duke Grabowski, Mighty Swashbuckler	Pirates, Zombie	Voices Only
2017	Danse Macabre: Curse of the Banshee	Lord Cavanagh	
2017	Phantasmat: Insidious Dreams	Doctor, Entity	Voices Only
2017	Grim Dawn: Ashes of Falmouth	Jordyth, Barnabas, Theodin Marcell	
2017	Hidden Expedition: The Curse of Mithridates	William Hunt	Voice Only
2018	Phantom Doctrine		Voices Only
2018	Lucius III	Lucifer	
2019	Showdown Bandit	Doc Carver	
2020	Ghostrunner	Architect	Voices Only
2021	Magic Legends		Voices Only
2022	Lego Star Wars: The Skywalker Saga	Salacious B. Crumb	
2022	Bendy and the Dark Revival	Nathan Arch, The Lost Ones	Voices Only
2023	Ghostrunner 2	Architect, Adam Hamada	
2024	Galacticare	Klem Banzig, Kouber	Posthumous Voice Role
