= Mordhau =

Mordhau may refer to:

- Mordhau (video game), a 2019 video game
- Mordhau (weaponry), a sword technique

== See also ==
- Mordhaus, a fictional location in the television series Metalocalypse
