= Unbound: Worlds Apart =

2021 puzzle-platform video game

- Developer: Alien Pixel Studios
- Publishers: Alien Pixel Studios; Digerati Distribution
- Designer: Sergiu Crăițoiu
- Programmers: Sergiu Crăițoiu; Andrei Simion
- Artist: Olga Ciob
- Writer: Dave Cook
- Composer: Alexey Nechaev
- Engine: Unreal Engine 4
- Platforms: Microsoft Windows; macOS; Linux; PlayStation 4; PlayStation 5; Xbox One; Xbox Series X/S; Nintendo Switch
- Release: July 28, 2021: Microsoft Windows, macOS, Linux, Nintendo Switch; July 28, 2021; PlayStation 4, PlayStation 5; February 9, 2022; Xbox One, Xbox Series X/S; February 11, 2022
- Genre: Puzzle-platform
- Mode: Single-player

Unbound: Worlds Apart is a puzzle-platform game developed and published by Alien Pixel Studios. The game was released for Windows, macOS, Linux, and Nintendo Switch on July 28, 2021. Digerati Distribution published the PlayStation and Xbox versions of the game. The PlayStation 4 and PlayStation 5 versions were released on February 9, 2022, later releasing on February 11 for Xbox One and Xbox Series X/S. Physical copies of the PlayStation versions will be released by Perp Games.

The game follows Soli, a mage with the ability to open portals into alternate realities. Portals have different abilities; some can manipulate time, invert gravity, or change Soli himself. The player is tasked with collecting crystals that open the gates to the dark world. The game's portal mechanics were inspired by the music video of the Architects' song "Gone with the Wind", from their 2016 album All Our Gods Have Abandoned Us. Development was funded through a Kickstarter campaign that raised over $41,000 by June 6, 2019.

Unbound: Worlds Apart received generally favorable reviews, with praise for the game's portal mechanics and art style.

== Gameplay ==
Soli creates a portal to stop a platform from falling, then uses it to cross a pit of spikes.

Unbound: Worlds Apart is a puzzle-platforming game taking place in the Sea of Reality, which connects all of the worlds in the game's universe. The player controls Soli, a mage with the ability to open portals into alternate realities. The player is tasked with collecting crystals that open the gates to the dark world. Soli can only be hit once, dying and respawning at the most recent checkpoint.

Portals that Soli creates manifest in a circle around him. There are ten portals in the game, each with its own abilities. Only the environment within a portal's area is affected; the rest remains unchanged. Portals can manipulate time, invert gravity, or change Soli himself. Only one portal can be used at a time, and the use of some portals can be blocked by certain gates. Portals can also affect the game's creatures, as some can become hostile if they are caught inside of them. As Soli progresses through the game, he will acquire new abilities, including an additional mid-air jump and a quick dash. These abilities enable the player to find new secrets or locations in previously explored areas. Floating cairns are used to fast travel through the game's world; they activate when Soli runs through them.

Throughout the game, the player encounters non-player characters (NPCs) who provide information about the game's lore. Soli can also find NPCs known as "lost villagers". Lost villagers can be found throughout the world, and provide information about the game's story if they are rescued. If enough lost villagers are rescued, harder levels in the game are unlocked.

== Plot ==
Unbound begins in Rhu, a village located in the world of Vaiya, just before the annual celebration of The Guardian. Rhu is built around a stone gate that contains a crystal suspended inside of it. Soli involuntarily creates a portal to an alternate realm, from which a creature jumps out. Soli then follows the animal outside of the village. When the ceremony starts, the crystal breaks and a portal opens. Vaiya is invaded by the Demon King, and Rhu is destroyed. Soli learns of his village's destruction upon his return. He falls into a cavern while fleeing from a demon. Soli picks up a crystal in the cavern and gains the ability to open portals at will.

== Development and release ==
Unbound: Worlds Apart was developed by Romanian indie studio Alien Pixel Studios. The game's concept was created in 2016 as a 3D project that used Unreal Engine. The gameplay revolved around players using a magical torch that affects the environment. The project later transitioned from 3D to 2D, and the team started to look for another gameplay mechanic that was similar to the torch. The game's portal mechanics were inspired by the music video of the Architects' song "Gone with the Wind", from their 2016 album All Our Gods Have Abandoned Us. Developer Sergiu Crăițoiu was watching the video when he noticed a portal in the background, giving him the idea to use it as a gameplay mechanic.

In July 2018, the team decided to create a Kickstarter campaign. They planned to launch the campaign in October, but did not due to a lack of experience with the site. They looked at the campaigns of other games within the puzzle-platformer genre and got in contact with other developers, asking them about their experience with the site. The campaign's launch was delayed to February 2019, with Crăițoiu citing multiple reasons, including the size of their community, a lack of a trailer, and a lack of a vertical slice demo. Unbound: Worlds Apart was featured at EGX 2018, and was playable during the event.

Alien Pixel Studios released a Kickstarter trailer for the game on April 2, 2019, with the campaign planned to start on May 7. On May 7, 2019, the team launched the campaign, seeking $25,000 to fund the game's development. It came with a free demo that was available to those who signed up. The campaign was successful, with over $41,000 raised by the campaign's end on June 6. Following the success of the Kickstarter campaign, the team quit their jobs to work on the game full time. Alien Pixel Studios was also a recipient of an Unreal Dev Grant, which helped cover some of the financial costs of development. In 2020, Unbound: Worlds Apart was featured at GamesRadar's Future Games Show. From October 7-13, the game's demo was available during the Steam Game Festival: Autumn Edition. Unbound: Worlds Apart's demo was made available again during the Steam Game Festival: February 2021 Edition. The game's July 28 release date was announced during the IGN Expo of E3 2021. During the COVID-19 pandemic, the team partnered with Triple Dragon to receive more funding, allowing the team to increase their size and accelerate the game’s development.

Unbound: Worlds Apart's soundtrack was composed by Alexey Nechaev, who previously worked on the video game Inmost. He composed different music for each of the game’s areas, intending for each location to be "very unique" and have its "own mood and tempo".

Unbound: Worlds Apart was released for Microsoft Windows, macOS, Linux, and Nintendo Switch on July 28, 2021. Video game publisher Digerati Distribution published the PlayStation and Xbox versions of the game. The release dates for the ports were announced in November 2021. The PlayStation 4 and PlayStation 5 versions were released on February 9, 2022, and later released on February 11 for Xbox One and Xbox Series X/S. Perp Games will publish the physical copies of the game for PlayStation 4 and PlayStation 5.

== Reception ==
Reception

Aggregate score
Aggregator	Score
Metacritic	PC: 78/100 (Note: Score based on 13 reviews); NS: 78/100 (Note: Score based on 12 reviews)

Review scores
Publication	Score
Adventure Gamers	4/5
Nintendo Life	8/10
Shacknews	8/10
Screen Rant	4.5/5

Unbound: Worlds Apart received "generally favorable" reviews according to review aggregator website Metacritic.

Matt Aukamp from Adventure Gamers rated the game 4/5 stars, praising the game's portal mechanic as "innovative". He also liked the game's hand-drawn art style, soundtrack, and gameplay. However, Aukamp felt that the story was underdeveloped and "not very engaging". Donovan Erskine from Shacknews agreed, describing the story as "generic", but praised the game's hand-drawn art style, calling it "gorgeous". Erskine felt that the portal mechanics made the puzzles creative, and wrote that the platforming was "challenging" and "inventive". Nintendo Life's Ollie Reynolds praised the portal mechanics and called the visuals "gorgeous", but felt that the game's frame rate was poor. Reynolds liked the cast of characters, and wrote that the game's world-building was "strong".

Ryan Keenum from Screen Rant rated the game 4.5/5 stars, strongly commending the gameplay mechanics, art style, and narrative, writing that they were all "fantastic". He compared the game's difficulty to that of Ori and the Blind Forest, and the puzzles to those of Limbo. Keenum recommended the game for fans of the puzzle-platforming genre or a "gorgeous" narrative.

=== Nominations ===
Unbound: Worlds Apart was nominated for the Audio category at CEEGA 2021, but lost to Cyberpunk 2077. The game was nominated for Best Concept at Adventure Gamers' 2021 Aggie Awards. The game was also included in the final shortlist of Tencent's GWB Game Awards.

Year	Association	Award	Category	Result	Ref.
2021	Adventure Gamers	Best Concept	Games	Nominated	
2021	Central & Eastern European Game Awards	Audio	Games	Nominated	
