= Mark Dodson =

Mark Dodson may refer to:

- Mark Dodson (record producer)
- Mark Dodson (actor)
