= Daniel Deluxe =

Russian electronic music producer

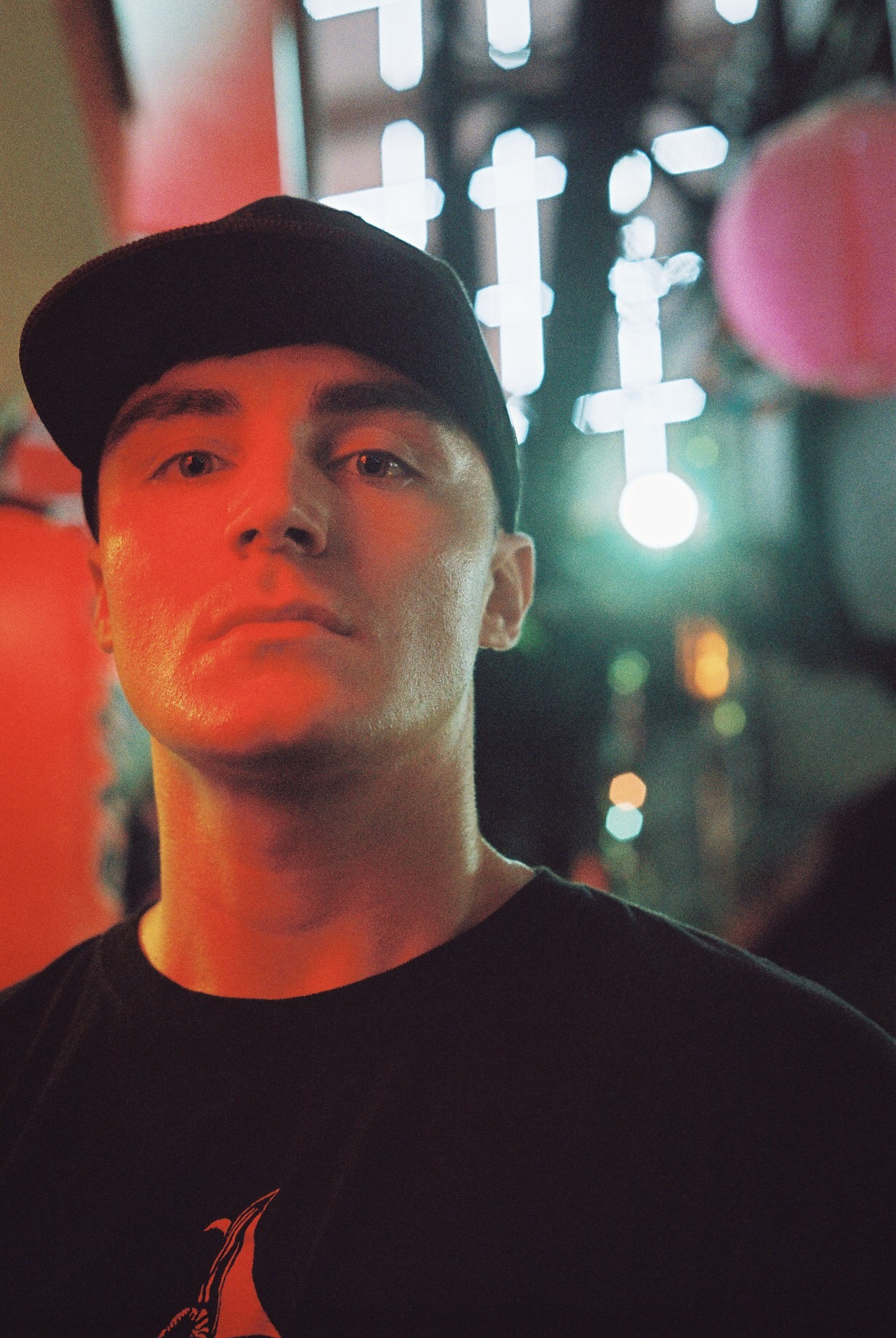

Background information
- Born: Daniel Alexandrovich; Moscow, Russia
- Genres: Electronic; synthwave; retrowave
- Years active: 2013–present
- Website: danieldeluxe.com

Daniel Alexandrovich, known professionally as Daniel Deluxe, is a Copenhagen-based, Russian electronic music producer. He has released three albums: Corruptor (2016), Instruments of Retribution (2017), and Exile (2020). Deluxe has also composed the scores for video games Desync (2017), Ghostrunner (2020) and Ghostrunner 2 (2023).

== Discography ==
=== Albums ===
- Corruptor (2016)
- Instruments of Retribution (2017)
- Exile (2020)
- Sometimes He Comes Back (2026)

=== Extended play ===
- Night Stalker (2014)

=== Original soundtracks ===
- Desync (2017)
- Ghostrunner (2020)
- Ghostrunner 2 (2023)
