= The King Is Watching =

2025 video game

- Developer: Hypnohead
- Publisher: tinyBuild
- Composer: Innata Vita
- Platforms: Windows, PlayStation 5, Xbox Series X/S, Nintendo Switch
- Release: 21 July 2025
- Genres: Real-time strategy, city builder, roguelike
- Mode: Single-player

The King Is Watching is a 2025 video game, where the player manages a castle, placing buildings to generate resources, produce units, and ultimately fight off enemy invaders. The game combines elements of real-time strategy and city builder games, with the run-based pseudorandom structure of a roguelike.

The game was developed by Serbian indie studio Hypnohead. First created for the October 2023 game jam Ludum Dare 54, the game underwent further development, including a change in genre, and was eventually published by tinyBuild for Windows in July 2025. It received generally favorable reviews, with critics reacting positively to the core mechanic and gameplay loop. The game sold over 500,000 copies and was a finalist for "Strategy/Simulation Game of the Year" at the 29th Annual D.I.C.E. Awards.

== Gameplay ==
A partially filled castle on the left, with units and enemies fighting on the right.

The King Is Watching is a single-player real-time strategy and city builder game with roguelike elements.

The player manages a castle, which is represented by a 5x5 grid of tiles. They place buildings in those squares; different buildings generate resources, transform resources into secondary resources, and produce units for combat. Enemy units periodically appear; the player's units will automatically fight them. The core mechanic is known as the "king's gaze". The player selects, by moving a shape over the grid, a limited number of tiles to be active at once; this number starts at three but can be upgraded over time. Buildings in tiles not under the king's gaze become inactive. The game runs in real-time, but the player is able to pause or speed up the game.

Resources are limited: each building can only generate a certain amount of resources before expiry, and buildings themselves are a resource. New buildings are acquired randomly as rewards for defeating enemies, or from traders that periodically appear. However, neither of these methods guarantees that particular buildings will appear.

The game is structured into runs in roguelike fashion. Each run is structured into waves. Between each wave, players can buy resources, or upgrades that last for the run, such as increasing the size of their castle or increasing the size of the king's gaze. Periodically, the player makes choices that determine how many enemies will be created in the following waves and the rewards given for defeating them.

After each run, there are metaprogression mechanics. The player unlocks different kings, advisors, and upgrades in skill trees. For each run the player can select a king, which provides passive and active abilities, and up to six advisors, which improve some aspect of their kingdom.

== Development ==
Hypnohead is a Serbian indie studio consisting of founders Semyon Itmanyuk and Maxim, as well as another programmer. The King Is Watching was first created for the October 2023 game jam Ludum Dare 54, where it ranked third place overall. Publisher tinyBuild discovered the game in February 2024, this led to a publishing contract in March of that year. The game was first announced, with a corresponding demo, in May 2024.

These early versions were described by Hypnohead as a puzzle-like deck-building game; the team found that "the game became repetitive" and revised the game to its current structure. A demo of this was released on Steam in July 2024, which was majorly updated in January 2025.

The full release was announced in May 2025, and was released on 21 July 2025 for Windows via Steam. DLC titled "Crowns of History" was released on 16 March 2026.

On 14 July 2026, it was announced that The King Is Watching would be released for PlayStation 5, Xbox Series X/S, and Nintendo Switch on 29 July 2026.

== Reception ==
Reception

Aggregate scores
Aggregator	Score
Metacritic	80/100
OpenCritic	93% recommend (Note: Based on 15 reviews)

Review scores
Publication	Score
The Games Machine (UK)	8.5/10
Gameliner.nl	3.5/5
Vandal	8/10

The King Is Watching received "generally favorable" reviews, according to review aggregator Metacritic. 93% of critics recommended the game, according to OpenCritic.

Reviewers complimented the gameplay and the core mechanic. PC Gamer's Fraser Brown found the gaze mechanic "both stressful and devilishly clever". Aftermath's Luke Plunkett described the integration of the gaze mechanic into the game as "elegant", commenting that the decision-making it added contributed to the game's "wonderful tension". Alessandro Alosi of The Games Machine describe the gameplay loop as constantly forcing the player to compromise and sacrifice, uniquely amongst the genre forcing the player to find balance between goals. Writing for Ars Technica, Kyle Orland praised the game's depth relative to its playtime, commenting that it "perfectly rides the fine line between engrossing and overwhelming". At release, some criticized the lack of an option to save the player's progress, although this feature was later added.

Some commented on the use of roguelike mechanics. Writing for PCGamesN, Rach Macpherson described the roguelike elements as letting the player learn from their mistakes. Vandal's William van Dijk said that the random acquisition of buildings and upgrades was positive in forcing the player to approach runs from different perspectives, but negative in causing frustration by adding a luck-based element. Similarly, Brown described the randomness as "crushing". Alosi complimented the metaprogression, describing it as contributing to a "one last game" gameplay loop.

Anita van Beugan of Gameliner.nl praised the variety of kings, but felt that variety was lacking in some other areas, such as enemies and areas. Van Dijk complimented the art and aesthetic, while lamenting that the game did not have more story. Van Beugan praised the game's pixel art, commenting that they found it charming and the iconography easy to understand. The game drew comparisons to 9 Kings, another kingdom building roguelike that was released in early access in 2025. Plunkett described The King Is Watching as a "deeper, more sedate strategy game", referencing the longer playtime and larger variety of content.

After its full release, The King Is Watching sold 200,000 copies in a couple weeks, and had sold 500,000 copies by March 2026. The game was a finalist in the "Strategy/Simulation Game of the Year" category at the 29th Annual D.I.C.E. Awards, and was nominated in the "Design" category at the 2025 Central & Eastern European Game Awards.
