= Dave Cook =

Video game journalist and author of comic books

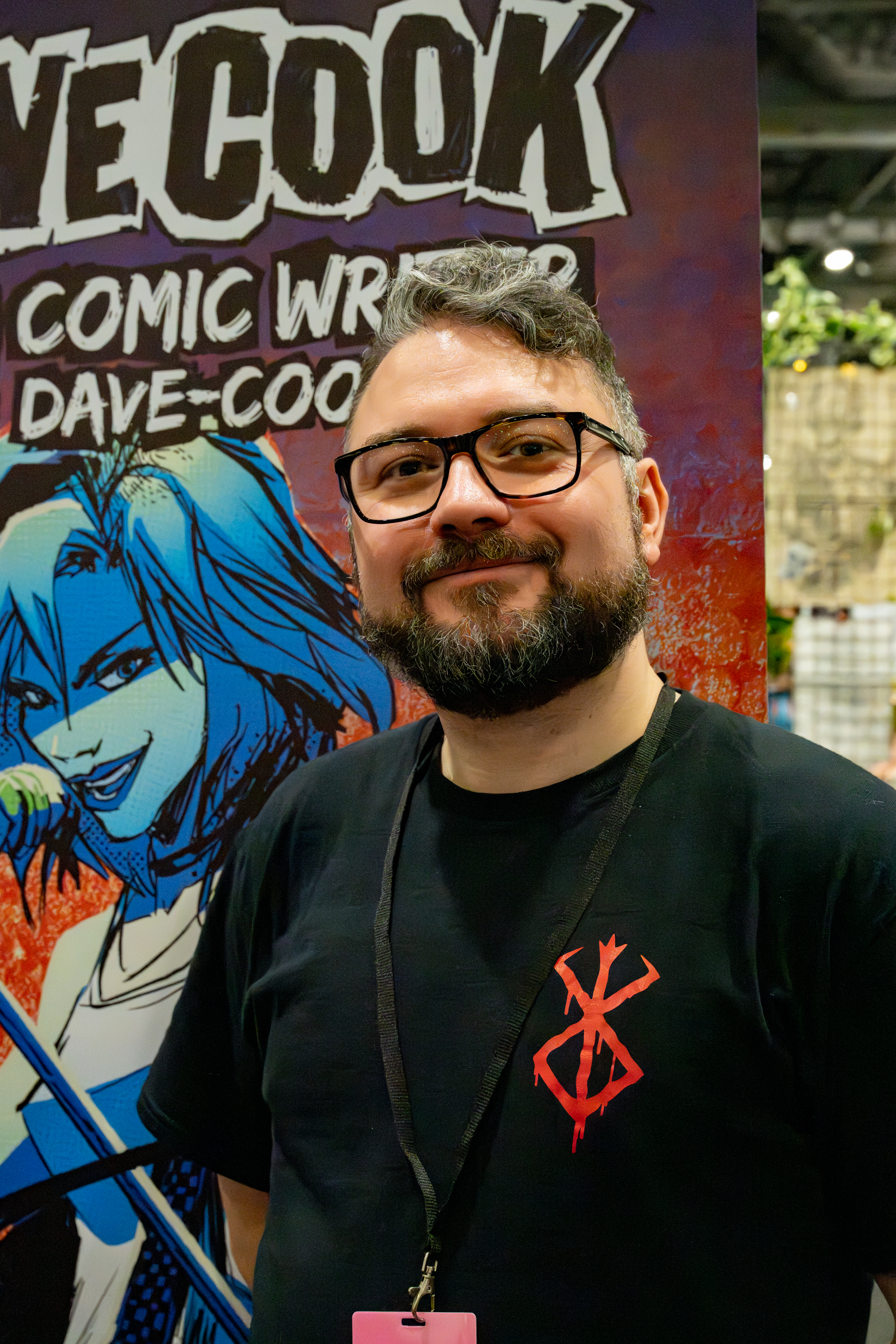
- At MCM Comic Con London, May 2025
- Born: 2 August 1983 (age 43); Scotland
- Occupation: Comic writer

Dave Cook is an author of comic books, video game history books and video game scripts, living in Edinburgh, Scotland. He has previously worked as a video game journalist and PR consultant. In 2014, he founded independent comic production house Card Shark Comics.

== Killtopia ==
In 2016, Cook released the first book in the cyberpunk comic series Killtopia through publisher BHP Comics, which in 2018 won a Creative Edinburgh Award for Creativity. In 2024, the series was compiled as a complete edition and distributed worldwide by publisher Titan Comics.

In 2021, Cook and BHP Comics sold the TV adaptation rights for Killtopia to Los Angeles animation studio Voltaku Studios

In 2024, Cook successfully curated, edited and self-published the comic anthology Killtopia: Nano Jams. The book contains more than 20 stories that look at how today's media technology (video games, social media, virtual reality, movies and more) could evolve in our warped cyberpunk future. It features contributions from more than 50 creators, including Skylar Patridge, Steve Gregson, Jason Loo, Liana Kangas, Stipan Morian, Gustaffo Vargas, Scott Bryan Wilson and GameSpot's Lucy James.

== Other comic book works ==
Under Card Shark Comics, Cook wrote and published post-apocalyptic comic series Bust, dark fantasy series Vessels and the six-part serial Feather for UK anthology Comichaus.

Cook also writes comic books with long-time collaborator, Steve Gregson. Their releases include BPM: Beatdowns Per Minute and Ninja Baseball Spirits – an adaptation of the 1993 IREM arcade beat 'em up game Ninja Baseball Bat Man, created in collaboration with the game's original creator, Drew Maniscalco.

In 2024, Cook appeared in issue #1 of the Boom! Studios horror anthology Hello Darkness. with the short story "Stay In Your Lane", featuring artist David Cousens, colourist Angel De Santiago and letterer Nathan Kempf.

== Video game history books ==
In 2021, gaming book publisher Bitmap Books announced it would be publishing Cook's coffee table book Go Straight: The Ultimate Guide to Side-Scrolling Beat 'Em Ups in February 2022.

Cook's second Bitmap Books project was released in 2024 – Run 'n' Gun: A History of On-Foot Shooters.

== Video game writing ==
In 2019, Cook began work on writing the video game Unbound: Worlds Apart with independent developer Alien Pixel Studios. The game launched on 28 July 2021, for Steam and Nintendo Switch.

In 2021, Cook announced he was writing for the early access version of rogue-like video game, Loot River, developed by independent developer Straka Studio.

In 2021, Cook self-published the non-fiction guide book Crowdfunding Comics: A Guide to Marketing, Running and Fulfilling a Comic Book Kickstarter.

== Video game journalism ==
He has written game reviews and features for online and print publications, including Vice, Lost in Cult, NME, and BuzzFeed. His previous work includes writing for GamesTM, The Escapist, as well as SquareGo, Ready Up, The List and The Skinny.

From January 2009 to April 2010, Cook was managing director of video game public relations firm Ink Media. He wrote a weekly gaming column in The Scotsman which has earned him a Games Media Award in 2008, 2010 and one in 2011 for best regional newspaper writer.

Between April 2010 and July 2012, Cook served as games editor at UK-based multiformat gaming site NowGamer. He wrote for video game website VG247 as Deputy Editor.

In October 2012, Cook received criticism by video games writer Rab Florence and video game journalist John Walker for participating in a competition to win a PS3 by tweeting about a specific company's game.

On Boxing Day 2013, Cook and author Matthew Drury released collaboratively-written sci-fi novel Drifting.
