= Sascha Dikiciyan =

German composer and musician

- Also known as: Sonic Mayhem, Toksin
- Born: December 18, 1970 (age 55); Stuttgart, Germany
- Genres: Dance/Electronic
- Occupations: Musician, composer, producer
- Instruments: Keyboards, synthesizer, drums
- Years active: 1993–present

Sascha Dikiciyan, known professionally as Sonic Mayhem, is a video game composer known for electronic and industrial scoring, producer and professional sound designer who has produced the soundtrack for Quake II, Tomorrow Never Dies, Hellgate: London, approximately half of the soundtrack for Quake III Arena, all the weapon sound effects for Unreal Tournament and, since the build 220 patch, also its predecessor, Unreal. Dikiciyan has also produced independent music albums.

Dikiciyan's style is primarily a very driving and forceful form of aggro-industrial, with an emphasis on repeated musical phrases (though this is less pronounced in his non-soundtrack work).

Dikiciyan's work came to prominence when he sent a copy of his first CD, Methods of Destruction, an alternate Quake soundtrack, to id Software in 1996. As a result, John Romero asked him personally to score the soundtrack for Quake II.

Dikiciyan has contributed sound patches to Moog Music's award-winning Animoog app. Dikiciyan is also known under the name Toksin, producing dance remixes for the likes of BT, Celldweller, and many others.

== Works ==
Video games
Title	Year	System	Notes
Quake: Methods of Destruction	1996	PC	Alternate soundtrack for Quake
Quake II	1997	PC, PlayStation	with Bill Brown and Jer Sypult, also composed the music expansion packs, Ground Zero & The Reckoning
Unreal	1998	PC, Mac	Sound effects
Unreal Tournament	1999	PC, PS2	
Tomorrow Never Dies	1999	PlayStation	with Tommy Tallarico, Howard Ulyate, and Todd Dennis.
Quake III Arena	1999	PC, PS2, Xbox 360	with Bill Leeb
Terminator 3: Rise of the Machines	2003	PS2, Xbox, GBA, Mobile phones	
Tom Clancy's Splinter Cell: Double Agent	2006	GameCube, PC, PS2, PS3, Xbox, Xbox 360, Wii	Main theme only, with Michael McCann
Battlezone PSP	2006	PSP	
Dark Messiah	2006	PC, Xbox 360	
SpyHunter: Nowhere to Run	2006	PS2, Xbox	with Kyle Richards and Cris Velasco
TMNT	2007	GameCube, PC, PS2, PSP, Wii, Xbox 360	
John Woo's Stranglehold	2007	PC, PS3, Xbox 360	with Jim Bonney, Jamie Christopherson and Serj Tankian.
Beowulf: The Game	2008	PC, PS3, Xbox 360, PSP	
G.I. Joe: The Rise of Cobra	2008	PS2, PS3, Wii, Xbox 360, Mobile phone, Nintendo DS, PSP	
Prototype	2009	PC, PS3, PS4, Xbox 360, Xbox One	
Mortal Kombat vs. DC Universe	2009	PS3, Xbox 360	with various others.
Borderlands	2009	PC, PS3, Xbox 360	with Raison Varner and Jesper Kyd.
Mass Effect 2	2010	PC, Xbox 360	Composed the soundtrack for the DLC pack, Kasumi - Stolen Memory.
MAG	2010	PS3	Composed the music for the Raven faction.
StarCraft II: Wings of Liberty	2010	PC	Additional music with Laurence Juber, Cris Velasco and Inon Zur
Arthur and the Revenge of Maltazard	2010	PS3, Wii, PC	with Jason Graves.
Tron: Evolution	2010	PC, PS3, PSP, Xbox 360	with Cris Velasco and Kevin Manthei
Warhammer 40,000: Space Marine	2011	PC, PS3, Xbox 360	with Cris Velasco.
Mass Effect 2: Arrival	2011	PC, PS3, Xbox 360	
Mortal Kombat	2011	PlayStation 3, Xbox 360, PSVita, PC	with Todd Haberman and Cris Velasco
The Agency	Unreleased	PS3, PC	
Twisted Metal	2012	PS3	with various others.
Might & Magic: Duel of Champions	2012	PC, PS3, Xbox 360	
Mass Effect 3	2012	PC, PS3, Xbox 360, Wii U	with Sam Hulick, Chris Lennertz and Clint Mansell, also composed the soundtrack for the DLC pack, Leviathan.
Borderlands 2	2012	PC, PS3, PSVita, Xbox 360, PS4, Xbox One, Nvidia Shield	with Raison Varner, Kevin Riepl and Jesper Kyd.
Injustice: Gods Among Us	2013	PS3, Wii U, Xbox 360, PC, PS4, PSVita, Mobile	with various others
Deus Ex: Mankind Divided	2016	PC, PS4, Xbox One	With Michael McCann, also scored the System Rift and A Criminal Past DLC packs.
The Long Dark	2017	PC, Xbox One, PS4	
Tom Clancy's The Division 2 (Season 9)	2022	PC, PS5, Xbox Series X	
Metal Eden	2025	PC, PS5, Xbox Series X	
Solo/other
Title	Year	System	Notes
Quake 3 Arena : Noise	1999	Digital Album	
Promo 2001	2001	Digital Album	
Music for Visual Media	2002	Digital Album	
Doomsday	2015	Digital Album	Physical Album
Dystopika: Meditations from the Future	2025	Digital Album	Physical Album
Metal Eden: Corrupted Memory Edition	2025	Digital Album	Physical Album
