= Metal Eden =

2025 video game

- Developer: Reikon Games
- Publisher: Deep Silver
- Composer: Sonic Mayhem
- Engine: Unreal Engine 5
- Platforms: PlayStation 5 Xbox Series X/S; Windows
- Release: September 2, 2025
- Genre: First-person shooter
- Mode: Single-player

Metal Eden is a 2025 first-person shooter video game developed by Reikon Games and published by Deep Silver. It was released on 2 September 2025 for PlayStation 5, Xbox Series X/S and Windows.

== Gameplay ==
Metal Eden is a first-person shooter. The player controls Aska, an android sent to Moebius to retrieve the Cores capable of storing the human mind while fighting the hostile robots who protect them. The player can "hijack" Cores from enemies, killing them instantly; the removed Cores can be tossed like a grenade or consumed to boost the health and activate the super-punch. Certain enemies have armour that protects the Core and breaks after absorbing enough damage or being hit with a super-punch. Scattered aross the levels are vials of dust, which are used to buy weapon attachments. The game features a skill tree with various player upgrades. Aska's Core can be upgraded using body modules obtained from hacking drones.

The player has extensive mobility options, being able to hover using a jet pack, grapple onto rails and wall-jump. A "Ball Mode" is unlocked later into the game, transforming the player into a ball that can roll at high speeds and deal damage on impact. A bullet time mechanic is present, allowing the player to briefly slow down time at will. Nexus, the creator of Aska, remotely communicates the player throughout the game.

== Plot ==
Metal Eden takes place in the far future, with the story mainly revolving around Cores - devices capable of storing the information of a human's brain. After the Earth became uninhabitable, millions of people have transferred their mind into Cores in hopes of these cores later being inserted into a new body, effectively resurrecting them. The Cores were sent to Moebius, a monolithic city floating above the surface of a planet Vulcan, built and occupied by corporations with the goal of extracting resources from the planet. The city was overrun by rogue AI and a mysterious group known as Engineers. Aska, the protagonist, is a Hyper Unit with regenerative powers, who is sent to Moebius to secure the Cores.

== Development ==
Metal Eden's art direction was partially inspired by Reikon Games' previous project, Ruiner. The game was first announced to the public during the State of Play presentation on 12 February 2025. A gameplay trailer was released on April 8, alongside a free demo. A speedrunning competition was hosted by Reikon Games with a $1,000 prize pool distributed among people who complete the demo the fastest. Originally slated for launch on 6 May 2025, the game was delayed to summer of that year due to feedback from the demo. The release was later postponed again to 2 September.

== Reception ==
Reception

Aggregate scores
Aggregator	Score
Metacritic	73/100
OpenCritic	64% recommend

Review scores
Publication	Score
Game Informer	8/10
TechRadar	3/5

Metal Eden received "mixed or average" reviews, according to the review aggregator website Metacritic.

Game Informer rated the game an 8/10, praising the movement and combat mechanics, while criticizing the narrative and calling the Ball Mode sections boring. GamingBolt gave the game a rating of 7/10, praising the gameplay and level design, while criticizing the game's performance, balance and weapon progression. TechRadar rated the game three stars out of five, complimenting the shooting mechanics, weapon variety and upgrade system, but calling the dialogue "jarring" and the companion characters "annoying", while also criticizing the frame rate issues. Various sources compared the game to Doom, Ghostrunner, Metroid and Titanfall.
