= Papetura =

- Developer: Petums
- Publisher: Feardemic
- Composer: Floex
- Engine: Unity
- Platforms: macOS; Windows; Nintendo Switch; PlayStation 4; PlayStation 5; Xbox One; Xbox Series X/S
- Release: Win, macOS; WW: May 7, 2021; Switch; WW: December 1, 2022; Consoles; WW: March 9, 2023
- Genre: Adventure
- Mode: Single-player

Papetura is a 2021 point-and-click adventure game developed by Petums and published by Feardemic.

== Gameplay ==
Players control Pape, a paper doll who lives in world made of paper. When creature made of sentient darkness attempts to set the paper world on fire, Pape and his sidekick, a worm named Tura, attempt to save it. This mostly involves solving puzzles.

== Development ==
Tomasz Ostafin did everything but the music and sound effects. Floex did the music. Ostafin was inspired by The Neverhood, an adventure game from 1996 that used claymation, to use real-world models. It took Ostafin six years to create the paper models, put them together to form scenes, and photograph them. It was made in Poland. Feardemic released Papetura for Windows on May 7, 2021; Switch on December 1, 2022; and Xbox One, Xbox Series X/S, and PlayStation 4 and 5 on March 9, 2023.

== Reception ==
On Metacritic, Papetura received positive reviews for Windows and mixed reviews on Switch. Adventure Gamers praised the work put the creating the paper world, the soundtrack, and the game's uniqueness. Nintendo Life similarly praised the world, puzzles, and soundtrack, but they criticized its brevity and controls on the Switch.

It won the awards for its visual art at the Independent Games Festival Awards and Central & Eastern European Game Awards.
