= Inbento =

2020 puzzle video game

- Developer: Afterburn
- Publisher: 7Levels
- Engine: Unity
- Platforms: Nintendo Switch; Xbox One iOS; Windows
- Release: 12 March 2020
- Genre: Puzzle

Inbento is a puzzle video game developed by Afterburn and published by 7Levels. It was released 12 March 2020. Players must prepare a bento by following a recipe perfectly. Inbento had mostly positive reviews.

== Gameplay ==
Inbento is a puzzle video game. The player, controlling a cat, must prepare a bento by following a recipe. Each stage has a recipe that must be replicated perfectly.

== Development and release ==
Inbento was developed by Polish studio Afterburn, the same one behind Golf Peaks. It was released 12 March 2020 for Nintendo Switch.

== Reception ==
Reception

Aggregate scores
Aggregator	Score
Metacritic	76/100
OpenCritic	73% recommend

Review scores
Publication	Score
AppGet	3.5/5
Cubed3	NS: 9/10; XSXS: 8/10
FNintendo	7/10
Multiplayer.it	7.5/10
Video Chums	3/5

Inbento received mostly positive reviews according to review aggregator website Metacritic. 73% of critics recommended the game according to OpenCritic.

Multiplayer.it stated its logic was accessible yet also difficult at the same time. Cubed3 writers agreed the game was charming and contains challenges when wanting more.

Inbento was also reviewed by TouchArcade, Stuff, and 148Apps.
