= SquareGo =

- Editor-in-Chief: Graeme Strachan
- Former editors: Josh Wilson, Dave Cook, Phil Harris
- Staff writers: Phil Doyle, Elspeth Ritchie, Si Wellings, Chris Peebles, Pete Swan, Thom Louis, Sidney Fussell, Paul Walker, Joel Spencer, Cameron Phillips, Rishi Alwani,
- Categories: Videogame Industry
- Frequency: Daily
- Circulation: 30,000 per calendar month
- First issue: August 2007
- Final issue: August 2008 (print)
- Company: Fidget Publishing
- Country: Scotland
- Based in: Edinburgh
- Language: English
- Website: https://www.square-go.com

SquareGo was an independent publication founded in Scotland in 2006 and publishing until 2015, which reported on video game news, reviews and previews.

== History ==
SquareGo originated as an offshoot from the digital section of The Skinny. Due to a lack of available space in the magazine's pages, the digital editor of The Skinny, Josh Wilson, started up a spin-off magazine with the aim of providing the digital coverage for the magazine but also with the required space to further cover the Games Industry.

In August 2008, SquareGo separated amicably all business links with The Skinny.

The website appeared online on 10 May 2006 as Fidget Magazine, but by August the name had been changed to SquareGo. The original paper edition of the magazine was published from August 2007 every calendar month until August 2008, featuring wraparound covers varying in subject from titles such as Star Wars: The Force Unleashed to Fallout 3.

In February 2009, SquareGo entered into a distribution deal with retail company Gamestation, to provide copies of the magazine in all Scottish branches of the store

The website took over in earnest after August 2008 and grew exponentially over the years to over 30,000 weekly hits.

The site slowed its article output throughout 2014, and closed for good in March 2015.

== Editors-in-chief ==
- February 2006 – June 2008; Josh Wilson
- July 2008 – August 2009; Dave Cook
- September 2009 – February 2010; Graeme Strachan
- February 2010 – December 2011; Phil Harris
- December 2011 – December 2012; Josh Wilson
- January 2013 – March 2015; Graeme Strachan

== Regular features ==
In addition to reviews, First Impression, and Hands-On previews, The magazine also regularly publishes several standard types of featured articles.

- Bargain/Bin – A series wherein Phil Harris and various colleagues review games that can be purchased for less than £5. Each game is given a rating of either 'Bargain' if it is an enjoyable distraction, or 'Bin' if they consider it worthless.
- Scotland in Focus – Phil Harris's series of articles looking into the Scottish Games industry and the wider political ramifications.
- For The Love Of... – A series of articles written by the staff on the topic of their favourite old games.
- Month in Japan – A monthly blog by Pete Swan, covering the gaming industry and gaming scene in Japan.
- Pixel Curry – A monthly blog by award nominated writer Rishi Alwani, covering the games industry and scene in India.

== Critical reception ==
On 7 November 2010 SquareGo was named Computer and Video Games's Site of the Week.

On 21 July 2011 SquareGo was named the 26th Best Website in Scotland by The List.
