= Liberated (video game) =

- Developer: Atomic Wolf
- Publisher: Walkabout Games
- Engine: Playable Graphic Novel
- Platforms: Windows; Nintendo Switch; PlayStation 4; Xbox One; Xbox Series X/S
- Release: Switch; June 2, 2020; Windows; July 30, 2020; Enhanced Edition; Nintendo Switch; December 3, 2020; PS4, Xbox One & Series X/S; April 20, 2022
- Genre: Action-adventure
- Mode: Single-player

Liberated is a 2020 action-adventure video game developed by Atomic Wolf and published by Walkabout Games. It was released on Nintendo Switch on June 2, 2020, with a version for Microsoft Windows launching on July 30, 2020. An enhanced edition released for the Nintendo Switch on December 3, 2020, and for PlayStation 4, Xbox One, and Xbox Series X/S on April 20, 2022.

The game uses hand-drawn interactive art in the style of comic books, with the intent of making the player feel like they're inside an actual graphic novel. The story is a tech-noir/cyberpunk thriller about democracy slipping into authoritarianism.

== Reception ==
Reception

Aggregate scores
| Aggregator | Score |
|---|---|
| Metacritic | 59/100 |
| OpenCritic | 33% recommend |

Review scores
| Publication | Score |
|---|---|
| GameSpot | 4/10 |
| Nintendo Life | 8/10 |
| Nintendo World Report | 3/10 |
| Shacknews | 6/10 |

Liberated received mixed reviews from critics. On the review aggregation website Metacritic, the Nintendo Switch version of the game holds a score of 59/100 based on 33 reviews. Fellow review aggregator OpenCritic assessed that the game received weak approval, being recommended by 33% of critics. The game received praise for its art style and music, but received criticism for its gameplay, level design, and poor performance of the Nintendo Switch version.
