= Pixel Federation =

Slovak video game developer and publisher

- Industry: Video Games
- Founded: 8 October 2007
- Headquarters: Bratislava, Slovakia
- Number of employees: 300 (2021)
- Website: portal.pixelfederation.com

Pixel Federation, Ltd. is a Slovak game developer and publisher. The company was founded in 2007 with headquarters in Bratislava, Slovakia. It publishes mobile and social networking games including Diggy's Adventure, Seaport, Trainstation, and Emporea.

With Trainstation garnering recognition in 2012, Pixel Federation became one of the Top 20 Facebook game-developing studios in the EMEA region. In 2017, it was recognized as one of the fastest growing tech startups in Central and Eastern Europe. In 2018, the company had over 300 employees and had earned more than €50,900,000 in revenues.

== Games ==
Title	Year	Status	Description
Libera Wing	2009	Discontinued	Action and strategy title for Nintendo DSi.
Emporea	2010	Available	Multiplayer war-strategy fantasy game focused on building alliances and conquering the world.
Happy Birthday Mart	2010	Discontinued	Title for Nintendo DSi.
TrainStation	2010	Available	Rail management simulation exploring trains and railways throughout history.
Diggy's Adventure	2012	Available	Casual adventure and exploration puzzle game with quests and events across the world.
Big Shopkeeper	2012	Discontinued	Online shop-management simulation game.
Seaport	2015	Available	3D game dedicated to ships, sea exploration and naval quests.
Morning Men	2016	Discontinued	Episodic story-driven RPG inspired by the golden age of science fiction.
Galactic Junk League	2016	Discontinued	Tactical competitive sci-fi combat/building multiplayer game.
CoLab	2016	Discontinued	VR escape room for HTC Vive and Oculus Rift.
Button Blast	2016	Discontinued	Matching puzzle app game.
TrainStation 2	2019	Available	New rail management simulation exploring trains and railways throughout history.
AFK Cats	2019	Available	Manage your CAT team, level up and fight against the epic Doomba vacuum cleaner with your friends to dominate the world!
Port City	2021	Available	New ship management simulation exploring ships and ports throughout the world.
Puzzle Adventure	2022	Available	Adventure-packed game with mysterious creatures, thrilling puzzles, and plot twists to discover and solve.
TrainStation3	2025	Available	Similar to Ts2, with higher Graphics and slight gameplay changes.
Highway Heroes: Truck Manager	2026	Available	New truck management simulation.
