= Replaced (video game) =

2026 video game

- Developer: Sad Cat Studios
- Publishers: Coatsink; Thunderful Publishing
- Director: Yura Zhdanovich
- Composer: Igor Gritsay
- Engine: Unity
- Platforms: Windows; Xbox Series X/S; Android
- Release: Windows, XBX/S; April 14, 2026; Android; December 8, 2026
- Genres: Action, platform
- Mode: Single-player

Replaced is a platform video game developed by Sad Cat Studios and published by Coatsink and Thunderful for Windows and Xbox Series X/S. It was released on April 14, 2026. A port for Android is scheduled to release on December 8 of the same year.

== Gameplay ==
Replaced is an action-platform video game. The game is set in a dystopian, alternate version of America in the 1980s. The player assumes control of R.E.A.C.H (Research Engine for Altering and Composing Humans), an artificial intelligence unwillingly trapped in the human body of his creator, Warren Marsh. As a 2.5D video game, the player character can move into the foreground and the background to retrieve items and upgrades. To progress, players must solve various environmental puzzles and complete platforming challenges. Replaced also features a free-flow combat system, in which indicators on enemies' heads remind the player when to counter or dodge. Performing multiple successful dodges or parries allow the player character to perform a special move which execute a regular enemy or destroy the shields of armored opponents. The game also features an explorable hub area where R.E.A.C.H can talk to other non-playable characters to know more about the game's world and setting, as well as tackling side quests.

== Development ==
Replaced was developed by Sad Cat Studios. It is the debut project for the studio, whose three founders only previously worked on mobile games. Development of the game started in 2018. According to co-founder Yura Zhdanovich, Replaced was designed with the intention of creating something that was more "risky" and "complicated". Zhdanovich added the team initially chose to make a game with "indie pixel art style", though they eventually became bored by it and decided to move the game to 2.5D, inspired by games like Hercules, Tails Noir and The Last Night. The initial goal for the studio was to make a cinematic platformer similar to Flashback and Another World, though they eventually decided to add a combat system to the game as they did not have a budget to create a solely "visual experience where [players] go from point A to point B". The platforming gameplay were inspired by Inside, Uncharted, and the Prince of Persia games released in the 2000s, whereas the combat system was inspired by Batman: Arkham. A lot of time was spent in creating the platforming animations of the protagonist, as the team wanted the game to look realistic.

According to Igor Gritsay, the co-founder of the studio, the game's story was about the "survival of a creature that knows nothing about the ruthless world it finds itself in". The cyberpunk theme was inspired by films such as Upgrade and Blade Runner 2049, though the team focused mainly on US culture and deemphasized the role Asian cultures typically play in cyberpunk fiction. While creating its setting, a retrofuturistic theme was chosen as the team loved old science-fiction films and wanted to explore how people in the past imagined about the future. The game is set in an alternate reality where the United States detonated nuclear bombs on its own soil instead of Japan at the end of World War II. The primary setting is Phoenix City, a walled-off urban enclave for the wealthy, where the poor have their organs harvested for the elite and are discarded outside the city’s borders.

Announced at E3 2021, the game was initially slated to be released in 2022, though it was delayed multiple times. Sad Cat Studios was originally based in Minsk, Belarus, though the Russo-Ukrainian War significantly impacted the game's production and prompted the studio to relocate to Cyprus. The game was released for Windows and Xbox Series X/S on April 14, 2026. A port for Android was announced in October 2026 and is scheduled to release on December 8 of the same year.

== Reception ==
Reception

Aggregate scores
Aggregator	Score
Metacritic	(PC) 76/100 (XSXS) 78/100
OpenCritic	79% recommend

Review scores
Publication	Score
Destructoid	7.5/10
IGN	7/10
The Guardian	3/5

Replaced received "generally favorable" reviews, according to review aggregator website Metacritic. Fellow review aggregator OpenCritic assessed that the game received strong approval, being recommended by 79% of critics.

Rachel Samples from Destructoid gave the game a 7.5/10 saying that "Despite REPLACED's glaring issues, it'll sink its teeth into you. The narrative's got bite with plenty of twists and turns, and the world-building, which is told through the game’s collectibles system and minor dialogue options, is enthralling."

IGN's Tristan Ogilvie scored the game a 7/10 with the verdict "Replaced is a gripping and gorgeous 2.5D action platformer, even though this cyberpunk adventure could do with a system update to completely iron out the bugs."

"This pulpy sci-fi thriller is a beautiful, if deferential, homage to the genre greats, with a poignant real-world echo." was the conclusion for Lewis Gordon on The Guardian with the score of 3 out of 5 stars.

Replaced received a nomination for "Best Debut Indie Game" at the Game Awards 2026.
