= Go Home Annie =

2024 video game

- Developer: Misfit Village
- Publisher: Nordcurrent Labs
- Designer: Mladen Bošnjak
- Writers: Mladen Bošnjak; Lovro Golac
- Engine: Unity
- Platforms: Microsoft Windows; PlayStation 5; Xbox Series X/S
- Release: Microsoft Windows; 10 December 2024; PS5, Xbox Series X/S; 31 March 2026
- Genre: Psychological horror
- Mode: Single-player

Go Home Annie is a 2024 first-person horror adventure video game developed by Misfit Village and published by Nordcurrent Labs.

== Plot ==
Go Home Annie is set in the SCP Foundation universe. The player takes the role of Annie, a low-level employee of the SCP Foundation, an organization tasked with securing and containing paranormal entities. Major gameplay elements involce solving various puzzles and exploring the environment. Annie initially finds herself in front of an abandoned house, then acquires a camcorder allowing her to see objects from a parallel universe.

== Development and release ==
The game was announced in 2022, when both a demo and a trailer were released, and entered beta by the end of 2023. Misfit Village was actively looking for a publisher during the early stages of development, eventually opting for Lithuanian-based publishing house Nordcurrent Labs. In total, the development of the game lasted five years.

The PC release for Go Home Annie was initially slated for release on December 3, 2024 but was subsequently postponed to December 10. The development of the game was partially funded by the Croatian Audiovisual Centre, which awarded the developers a grant of 75,000 kuna (€10,000) in 2021. A new update for the game, with additional story content, as well as ports to PlayStation 5 and Xbox Series X and S, were released on March 31st, 2026.

== Reception ==
A review published on the Greek editions of PCMag and IGN made positive remarks, giving it 8.0 out of 10. Softpedia was also positive in its review, praising its story and atmosphere, but criticized the stealth sequences and puzzles, giving it 8.5 out of 10.
