= Aquatico =

- Logo
- Developer(s): Digital Reef Games
- Publisher(s): Overseer Games
- Platform(s): Windows
- Release: January 12, 2023
- Genre(s): City-building
- Mode(s): Single-player

Aquatico is an underwater city-building video game released on January 12, 2023, and developed by Digital Reef Games and published by Overseer Games.

== Gameplay ==
The game's gameplay revolves around building a city at the bottom of the ocean. The player places buildings, discovers diverse biomes, gathers resources, checks temperature readings etc. It also includes a research tree to unlock various technologies and buildings such as sushi houses, oxygen retractors and similar.

On April 12, 2023, it released a major update which added more mods, story content and citizen opinions game mechanic.

== Reception ==
The game received mixed reviews upon release. Ken Allsop of PCGamesN described it as Subnautica meets Cities: Skylines. Rock, Paper, Shotgun praised its presentation and visuals, but criticized the gameplay as being too straightforward and uncompelling, as well as lacking in the survival aspect. PC Gamer was similar in its critique, stating that although there are 'charming details and inventive ideas', as well as a deep management system, the city itself never felt convincing, and gave it a score of 68. German GameStar likewise praised its setting, but said it offers too little to compete with other similar games in the genre, giving it 70%.
