= Ukrainian Fight Drone Simulator =

2025 video game

- Developer: Simtech Solutions
- Platform: Microsoft Windows
- Release: 2025
- Genre: Combat flight simulator / Flight simulator
- Modes: Single-player, Multiplayer

Ukrainian Fight Drone Simulator (also Ukrainian Fight Drone Simulator – Starter Edition, abbreviated as UFDS) is a flight simulation program produced by Simtech Solutions, available since 10 December 2025 via digital distribution on the Steam platform. The production constitutes a commercial version of software used for training operators of combat drones (primarily soldiers of the Ukrainian armed forces). The purpose of the program is operator training rather than providing entertainment typical of combat flight simulator video games, and therefore the game does not focus on typical elements such as narrative.

== Production ==
Ukrainian Fight Drone Simulator was designed as a realistic simulator of combat drone piloting intended for civilians interested in acquiring practical skills in operating such machines. The production is a simplified, commercial version of software used to train operators of combat drones (primarily soldiers of Ukrainian military units); the full version has been used to train more than 5,000 drone operators in Ukraine and is based on real-world experience and feedback from soldiers.

The program was designed by Simtech Solutions (associated with the Ukrainian research and training center Drone Fight Group) and has been available since 10 December 2025 via digital distribution on the Steam platform. The publicly available version is representative of the initial stages of combat operator training and is described as "a game that is ‘not entirely a game". Elements considered classified (e.g. information concerning tactics or military algorithms) were removed from the program; according to the producer, "What the user sees on Steam is only a basic educational level".

== Gameplay ==
Gameplay in Ukrainian Fight Drone Simulator focuses exclusively on simulating drone flight—from device launch to its destruction, target impact, or loss of control. The program offers a set of training scenarios (without an extensive or connecting narrative, although the game clearly references the war in Ukraine—some missions take place, for example, on Snake Island in the Black Sea), in which the user practices obstacle avoidance, precise maneuvers, and attacks on stationary and moving targets. Available drones include reconnaissance, bombing, kamikaze, and interceptor drones; additional drones (e.g. with longer range) are planned to be added. The game uses real combat drones (produced by Drone Fight Group) active on the Ukrainian front, including Angel Arrow 12", Angel Arrow 15", Mimic 3T, FPV Kamikaze Phantom 7–10", and LuckyStrike. Gameplay is presented in the first-person perspective. Realistic targets are available—enemy infantry, fortifications, and vehicles (ground-based as well as airborne).

Ukrainian Fight Drone Simulator incorporates numerous elements of flight physics and factors present on the modern battlefield, such as range limitations caused by electronic warfare systems, weather conditions, day and night operations, PID controller tuning, and navigation using the NATO standard Military Grid Reference System (MGRS); according to the producer, no other drone flight simulator offers similarly realistic gameplay elements. The high degree of realism translates into a high level of complexity—reviewers note that before the player even encounters the enemy, they will crash many (dozens of) times.

The simulator nature of the program is reflected in the control system. Although it is possible to use a keyboard or gamepad, reviews indicate that the target solution is compatible radio controllers for FPV drones. Differences in control stick behavior significantly affect flight realism, including thrust control, altitude, and maneuvering, making the program closer to real training conditions. However, certain solutions were implemented to increase gameplay attractiveness, such as shortening the long and usually monotonous flight time to the target.

Although the program is described as a simulator, it also contains elements atypical for the genre, such as logistical management of ammunition and fuel (battery) supplies, and mission planning (including map study), which is sometimes compared to the real-time strategy genre. Initially, the game did not include a multiplayer mode—it was planned as an expansion; according to data from 1 February, it is already described as a game feature on the Steam platform. Besides the main single-player and multiplayer combat modes, a non-combat drone racing mode was also added in an update.

== Reception ==
Reception

Review score
Publication	Score
CD-Action	8/10

A reviewer from CD-Action assessed the program as a useful and proven training tool for future combat drone operators. The program was compared to an interactive shooting range, allowing for safe improvement of piloting skills without the risk of losing real equipment. The review also stated that the simulator is a more realistic training tool than other productions on similar topics available on Steam. The reviewer emphasized that each mission requires repeated attempts to achieve operational proficiency. The production received a score of 8/10, while also noting limitations such as the lack of a typical storyline, limited artificial intelligence and enemy capabilities, a small number of dynamic combat scenarios, and a modest basic training program; the reviewer stressed that the high rating was given in the context of evaluating the program as a training tool for drone pilots rather than an entertainment-focused video game, concluding: “I recommend it to those who want to learn drone control with the intention of using this skill on the battlefield. Everyone else can pass. And if someone just wants to fly a drone on a computer screen, without ramming tanks and searching for Kamaz trucks, they should reach for the well-reviewed and more spectacular Uncrashed”.

The game was also described by John Breeden II for the NextGov portal. The review emphasized that Ukrainian Fight Drone Simulator goes beyond the framework of a typical video game and represents a publicly available version of an advanced simulator used to train Ukrainian military operators. The author highlighted the high level of realism, encompassing flight physics, battlefield condition modeling, and the necessity of mission planning while accounting for threats such as air defense and electronic warfare. The reviewer noted that the simulator is demanding and "unforgiving" for the user, and that effective gameplay relies on training, discipline, and repetition rather than entertainment elements. The article also stated that the program allows for a better understanding of the role of drones in modern armed conflicts and the importance of operator training as a key factor of military advantage. In conclusion, the reviewer wrote: "Although I had a great experience with Ukrainian Fight Drone Simulator, it was not really about flying for fun. It was more about understanding how drones can be successfully used in modern conflicts".

== See also ==
- Ghost of Kyiv
