= YesterMorrow =

2020 video game

- Developer: Bitmap Galaxy
- Publisher: Blowfish Studios
- Director: Peter Jánošík
- Engine: Unity
- Platforms: Windows, Switch, PlayStation 4, Xbox One
- Release: November 5, 2020
- Genre: Platform
- Mode: Single-player

YesterMorrow is a 2D scrolling platform game developed by Slovak studio Bitmap Galaxy and published by Blowfish Studios for Microsoft Windows, Nintendo Switch, PlayStation 4, and Xbox One on November 5, 2020. Upon its release, the game received generally favorable reviews on PC, PlayStation 4, and Xbox One, but negative reviews for Nintendo Switch due to technical issues.

== Gameplay ==
The player takes control of Yui and has to jump, climb, and run through different environments, beating enemies and, collecting Everlight, a mysterious source of energy that is used for special abilities. Throughout the game, the player unlocks more abilities and can therefore reach new areas in previous locations. Furthermore, the player can talk to non-player characters, find animals to pet, and travel to the past or the future at certain points in the game. As the player advances through the story more lore entries are unlocked to learn more about the world and its inhabitants.

== Plot ==
Rui's world has been destroyed and her family kidnapped. In order to save them she has to embark on a journey through the four islands, which include forest, desert, ice, and clockwork environments. On her journey she collects Everlight and fights against the Shadows and other enemies. In order to restore everything to normal, the so-called Conduit has to be fixed. Depending on the overall completion one out of two endings can be unlocked.

== Development ==
The game was developed by Bitmap Galaxy and programmed by Peter Jánošík, Jorge Rosique Contreras, and Lubos Lednar. It was simultaneously released on all platforms by Blowfish Studios on November 5, 2020. Furthermore, it was published in China by Gamera Game and in other Asian countries by ORENDA.

In an interview, the developers cited older Nintendo titles as in inspiration, such as Super Mario and Donkey Kong Country, while other parts were inspired by modern titles such as Celeste, TowerFall, The Messenger, SteamWorld Dig, Hollow Knight, and Timespinner.

The game was written in English and translated into French, German, Spanish, and Russian by the localization group Warlocs. The funding was supported by Slovak Arts Council.

== Reception ==
Reception

Aggregate scores
Aggregator	Score
Metacritic	71/100 (PC); 69/100 (Xbox One); 49/100 (Nintendo Switch)
OpenCritic	18% recommend

According to review aggregator Metacritic, YesterMorrow received "mixed or average reviews" for PC and Xbox One based on 5 reviews respectively, and "generally unfavorable reviews" for Nintendo Switch based on 9 reviews. Fellow review aggregator OpenCritic assessed that the game received weak approval, being recommended by 18% of critics.

Screen Rant gave the Nintendo Switch release a negative rating of 2 out of 5 stars saying, "If YesterMorrow is fixed, then it would make for a decent, if unambitious game. As it stands, the technical issues are so distracting that we can't recommend it in its current form. The odd glitch can be overlooked in a title during its launch window, but the problems in YesterMorrow are so persistent that they undermine the entire experience."

PC Invasion gave the PC release a positive rating of 8.5 out of 10 saying, "YesterMorrow is a thoroughly enjoyable, challenging 2D platformer with excellent pixel artwork and lots of familiar tropes. No one will be impressed by the story or the uniqueness of anything it has to offer, but the consistently strong game design and tight controls make it well worth playing all the same."
