= Gray Dawn (video game) =

2018 video game

- Developer: Interactive Stone
- Publisher: Interactive Stone
- Engine: Unreal Engine 4
- Platform: Windows
- Release: June 7, 2018
- Genre: Survival horror
- Mode: Single-player

Gray Dawn is a survival horror game from Romanian independent game studio Interactive Stone. It was released on June 7, 2018. The game is a psychological thriller infused with religious elements and revolves around Father Abraham, a priest who is trying to find the missing altar boy.

== Gameplay ==
The gameplay is survival horror from a first-person perspective. The player takes the role of the protagonist, Father Abraham and explores the scenes by walking around and clicking on certain objects. The game features voice-overs and subtitles to convey the story and the player has the option to listen to recordings to learn more about it. In order to advance through the story, the player has to solve some puzzles and can optionally collect seven images of Christ. Depending on whether the player found all seven images or not, there are two different endings to discover.

== Plot ==
The game is set on Christmas Eve in 1920. Father Abraham has to solve several mysteries at once, starting with the disappearance of altar boy David. It is implied that Father Abraham has killed several children and he has to find evidence in order to save himself from wrongful persecution. In dream-like sequences, Abraham finds more clues in a world from David and finally uncovers what really happened. Father Abraham has to piece these clues together in order to prove his innocence — if he is innocent.

== Development ==
The game has been in development since 2015, and after a failed Kickstarter campaign with only €2,542 of the €50,000 goal, it was released on June 7, 2018 for PC. The Bucharest-based games incubator/accelerator Carbon offered development funding for Gray Dawn and they also helped with mentorship as well as support with PR/Marketing. On July 13, 2018, an update was released including a German as well as a Romanian and Hungarian translation. On 28th of april 2024 the game was released on ps4 and ps5

== Reception ==
Reception

Aggregate scores
Aggregator	Score
GameRankings	90%
Metacritic	73/100

The game received mixed or average reviews.

Gray Dawn received a rating of 5/5 stars on digitallydownloaded.net with reviewer Ginny W. saying, "The real strength of Gray Dawn lies far from its decent controls, its ability to run economically on a PC whilst looking amazing, and its employment of psychological horror tropes to get your heart rate up. This game peers at the line between portraying real life religion in a game and using it as artful commentary, and completely obliterates it."

Gamespace.com praised the "engaging story with twists", but criticized the voice acting, religious iconography, and the character model design, while saying, "Gray Dawn is true to its description of being a psychological thriller with religious elements, but it can’t seem to focus in on which religious elements it wants to portray."
