= Golf Club: Nostalgia =

2018 video game

- Developer: Demagog Studio
- Publisher: Untold Tales
- Director: Igor Simić
- Composers: Shane Berry; Igor Simić
- Engine: Unity
- Platforms: iOS; Android; Microsoft Windows; PlayStation 4; Xbox One; Nintendo Switch
- Release: iOS; June 20, 2018; Android; December 24, 2018; PC, PS4, XONE, NS; September 3, 2021
- Genre: Sports
- Mode: Single-player

Golf Club: Nostalgia (formerly known as Golf Club: Wasteland) is a 2018 video game developed by Demagog Studio and published by Untold Tales. It was initially launched on June 20, 2018, on iOS and on Android in late December 2018. On September 3, 2021, it was released on Microsoft Windows, PlayStation 4, Xbox One, and Nintendo Switch, after being announced at E3 2021. The game has players explore desolate ruins of the Earth that have been transformed into a golf course after an apocalyptic event kills all of humanity except for the extremely wealthy, who flee to Mars. The game's narrative is mainly told through its soundtrack, which presents itself as a radio show called "Radio Nostalgia from Mars" playing music and interviews of people reminiscing about life on Earth.

Primarily developed by the visual artist Igor Simić, the game follows in the footsteps of his earlier mobile games, Crisis Expert and Children's Play, in providing commentary on social issues. Specifically, Golf Club: Nostalgia was inspired by the influence that owners of large corporations have on the world. The game has been praised for its soundtrack, narrative, and art style, while it has been criticized for relatively simple and shallow golf gameplay.

== Gameplay and synopsis ==
The game's minimalist art style highlights large skyscrapers and pink signs in the background in addition to a deserted foreground.

The gameplay of Golf Club: Nostalgia occurs over 35 two-dimensional, side-on golf stages. Some levels also have players use golf balls to open mechanical switches. Each hole has a designated par, ranging from 3 to 20. There are three modes of gameplay: "Story Mode", with no restrictions on stroke count, "Challenge Mode", with an enforced par limit, and "Iron Mode", in which no mistakes are allowed. On the desktop and console releases, players set an angle and power using an analog stick or mouse, swinging with one button press, while mobile players drag their fingers to aim and release.

In the story, an ecological catastrophe has caused rich inhabitants of Earth to move to Tesla City on Mars, with the decaying wasteland of Earth (specifically the city of Alphaville) being used as a golf course. The narrative of the game is primarily told through its soundtrack, an in-game radio station called "Radio Nostalgia from Mars" playing original music tracks, safety public service announcements, and interviews of survivors, in addition to diary entries that are unlocked through game progress. A common theme throughout the interviews is the nostalgia that people have for Earth, contrasting to the corporate-owned environment of Mars, with one interviewee wondering "Is living this way on Mars worth living at all?" The public service announcements showcase details of Martian life, such as the need for rationing water and anger management. The art of the game's stages features demolished and empty buildings dotted with neon signs.

== Development and release ==
Golf Club: Nostalgia was developed by Igor Simić, a visual artist from Belgrade, Serbia, in collaboration with two high school friends who were programmers. The team initially formed because of Simić's interest in pursuing video games as art, and he stated that the games aimed to be "something more akin to interactive satire" due to his background as an editorial cartoonist. Together known as "Demagog Studio" (named after demagogue, a term for a populist leader), they had previously worked on other "experiments" aiming to provide dark commentary on social issues, including Crisis Expert, a game referencing the 2008 financial crisis, and Children's Play, themed around child labor. For Golf Club: Nostalgia, Simić was inspired by the power and influence of corporations and their owners, an idea he called the "Silicon Valley Ideology". The apocalyptic golf concept (described internally as "Desert Golfing meets Blade Runner") took inspiration from a viral picture of golfers playing in front of the Eagle Creek Fire in addition to then-United States President Donald Trump's ownership of golf courses. Simić aimed to create an "emotional kind of message" with the story, attempting to "make [players] think of things [they] have now as if [they] had lost them forever". The background ruins were illustrated to look like communist-era architecture, particularly brutalist buildings and large monuments.

Golf Club: Nostalgia was created using the game engine Unity. The development team used FMOD to create ambient sounds, and they used custom shaders and tools to form the game's atmospheric art style. They reduced background assets to minimal silhouettes with small color palettes and used a blue fog effect, aiming to create a bleak yet light-hearted mood. Demagog also animated three-dimensional music videos, acting as narrative-less mood boards, in Unity. "Radio Nostalgia from Mars", the game's soundtrack, was developed in collaboration with Shane Berry and originally comprised seven original songs in addition to interviews. Simić envisioned the game as an "interactive audio book", with the radio program being the focal point of the game. After meeting Janet Biggs, an artist who had worked at the Mars Desert Research Station in Utah, they decided to make the interviews be realistic and plausible for Martian residents, rather than add satirical elements, as "the reality was absurd enough".

The game was released for iOS on June 20, 2018, to coincide with the Unite Berlin event. In September 2018, a new song called "Two Astronauts" was added to the soundtrack, with vocals from Ana Ćurčin. The game was then ported to Android on December 24, 2018. The desktop and console release of Golf Club: Nostalgia was announced for August 2021 during IGN's Summer of Gaming event, part of E3 2021. Simić jokingly announced in July of that year that only one copy of the game would be sold, at a price of $500 million. He added that it would be distributed on 750 floppy disks to "help maximize the amount of environmental damage" of the video game. The game's release was slightly delayed, due to the developers wanting "to finish up some free extras", to September 3, 2021. On that day, it was released on Microsoft Windows (distributed via both Steam and the Epic Games Store), PlayStation 4, Xbox One, and Nintendo Switch. Orders of the game also included a two-hour-long soundtrack and a 55-page graphic novel called Charlie's Odyssey. The publisher Untold Tales, consisting mostly of former Techland employees, attempted to create word-of-mouth marketing for the game by posting information about the game's story and message rather than its mechanical features. In July 2023, the developers were forced to change the title of the game from Golf Club: Wasteland to Golf Club: Nostalgia due to a legal claim.

== Reception ==
Reception

Aggregate score
Aggregator	Score
Metacritic	PC: 78/100; PS4: 76/100; XONE: 77/100; NS: 76/100

Review scores
Publication	Score
Nintendo Life	7/10
Nintendo World Report	7.5/10
Push Square	7/10
TouchArcade	4.5/5

According to review aggregator Metacritic, reviews of Golf Club: Nostalgia were "generally favorable" on all desktop and console platforms.

Reviewers generally praised the sound design of the game, especially its radio format: Andy Chalk of PC Gamer stated that it "plays one of the best videogame soundtracks [he's] heard in ages". Several found it calming, including Jordan Loades from Nintendo World Report, who noted that the soundtrack "offers an incredible yet melancholic backdrop", and Rock Paper Shotgun's Katharine Castle, who called the station "[the game's] greatest weapon against any grinding or gnashing of teeth" and "just so darn soothing". The narrative and art style were also high points noted by reviewers, with Chalk writing that "the real hook, though, is everything that's going on in the background". TouchArcade's Carter Dotson enjoyed the story and its themes, saying that "it uses golf quite well to convey a message, even if it is a bit ham-fisted at times". However, Ollie Reynolds of Nintendo Life found some of the neon signs to be "needlessly childish" or inappropriate and that they "pulled [him] out of an otherwise pretty engaging and deep narrative". Christopher Byrd, writing for The Washington Post, applauded the game's use of references to science fiction novels and films.

Some reviewers, such as Byrd, praised Golf Club: Nostalgia's simple mechanics, but others, including Loades and Reynolds, largely considered it and the repetitive gameplay a negative. Loades also thought that the level design was uninspired, with the puzzle elements seeming more like annoyances. Chandler Wood of PlayStation LifeStyle found the gameplay highly frustrating, with inconsistent swings, necessary trial and error to determine the correct path, and long animations required to restart each stage; he stated that the golf "is simply not all that fun" and that he wished the developers focused more on secrets and interactions rather than "making frustratingly difficult levels that require lobs to barely reachable and tiny platforms". Push Square's John Cal McCormick stated that the holes "are more like little, self-contained puzzles than actual golf courses" but noted the presence of some frustrating levels. Additionally, Castle felt that the distance of shots could be difficult to judge and thought it could be clarified with color coding.
