= Rue Valley =

2025 video game

- Cover
- Developer: Emotion Spark Studio
- Publisher: Owlcat Games
- Platforms: Linux; macOS; Nintendo Switch; PlayStation 5; Windows; Xbox Series X/S
- Release: 11 November 2025
- Genre: Role-playing
- Mode: Single-player

Rue Valley is a 2025 role-playing video game developed by Serbia-based Emotion Spark Studio and published by Owlcat Games. It follows Eugene Harrow, who is stuck in a 47 minute time loop in the desert town Rue Valley. It was released on 11 November 2025 on PC via Steam, as well as on Nintendo Switch, PlayStation 5, and Xbox Series X/S. The game received mixed reviews from critics.

== Synopsis ==
The game follows Eugene Harrow, who recently arrived at a motel in the desert town Rue Valley, where he meets a therapist through his mental health issues. At 8:47, the entire sky alights and Harrow finds himself back in therapy, realizing that he is stuck in a 47 minute time loop.

== Gameplay ==
Gameplay screenshot

The player starts the game by assigning the protagonist's personality points across three different spectrums: decisional, social, and emotional, making Eugene impulsive, short-tempered or anxious that allows or locks dialogue options. Inspiration points can be acquired to activate "intentions", which serve as quests, and as Harrow's mental health he can also acquire willpower, which serve as permanent inspiration points that can be reused after an intention is completed.

== Reception ==
Reception

Aggregate scores
Aggregator	Score
Metacritic	(PC) 70/100
OpenCritic	39% recommend

Review score
Publication	Score
PC Gamer (US)	62/100

The PC version of Rue Valley received "mixed or average reviews" according to the review aggregation website Metacritic. Fellow review aggregator OpenCritic assessed that the game received fair approval, being recommended by 39% of critics.

A review in Console Creatures praised the game's writing, time loop mechanics and graphics, although it noted performance issues on Steam Deck. Maddi Chilton in PC Gamer notes the similarities between Rue Valley and Disco Elysium and describes as an "extremely effective metaphor" the time loop as manifestation of depression and surreal happenings as literalization of mental state, but felt that the game failed in its execution and felt that the loop mechanic was sometimes tedious. Rue Valley has been described as a spiritual successor of Disco Elysium.
