= Inked (video game) =

2018 video game

- Developer: Somnium Games
- Publishers: Starbreeze Studios; Pixmain (consoles); Nuverse (iOS, Android)
- Platforms: Microsoft Windows; Nintendo Switch; PlayStation 4; Xbox One; iOS; Android
- Release: Windows; 26 April 2018; Switch, PS4, Xbox One; 27 August 2021
- Genre: Puzzle-platform
- Mode: Single-player

Inked: A Tale of Love is a puzzle-platform game developed by Somnium Games and published by Starbreeze Publishing for Microsoft Windows. It was demoed at the 2016 Reboot Infogamer convention in Zagreb and released on 26 April 2018 via Steam. An iOS and Android version was released in February 2021. Versions for Nintendo Switch, PlayStation 4 and Xbox One published by Pixmain were later released on 27 August 2021.

The story follows two protagonists; a rogue samurai called Nameless Hero, who is on a quest for his love Aiko, and Adam, a comic book artist. The game uses an art style similar to papercraft visuals, but using a ballpoint pen on a grid textbook for outlining.

== Reception ==
Upon release, the game received mixed reviews. It has an aggregated score of 67 on Metacritic, based on 15 reviews for the PC version. It holds 78 for the Nintendo Switch version, based on 4 reviews. Destructoid praised the aesthetic, Nintendo Life in its review criticized its length, but praised its visuals, soundtrack, story and puzzles. Pocket Gamer also praised the visuals, but found the puzzles tiring after a while. Gamezebo complimented the unique look and puzzles, but complained that the camera could use more movement. Destructoid stated it had high potential, but ultimately found the movement awkward.
