= Ministry of Broadcast =

2020 adventure platform game

- Developer: Ministry of Broadcast Studio
- Publisher: Hitcents
- Engine: GameMaker Studio 2
- Platforms: Microsoft Windows; macOS; Nintendo Switch
- Release: Microsoft Windows 30 January 2020; Nintendo Switch 28 April 2020
- Genre: Platformer
- Mode: Single-player

Ministry of Broadcast is a 2020 independent adventure cinematic platform video game developed by the developer Ministry of Broadcast Studio. It was mostly praised for its character development, cinematic tone, art style and story. It is inspired by George Orwell's novel 1984.

== Gameplay and plot ==
Gameplay of Ministry of Broadcast is inspired by Prince of Persia as a classical 2D platform game. The game is set in a totalitarian country divided by the Wall. The player character, named Orange, must compete in a lethal reality TV show called the "Wall Show". Orange goes through various levels full of traps and enemies that include guards dogs; must avoid hostile characters and traps that include spikes or piranhas in water and comes across puzzles that needs to be solved and can use other contestants to solve the puzzle.

== Development ==
Ministry of Broadcast was in development since February 2018 by two teams known as Twin Petes (Petr Škorňok and Petr Melicherík) and Fuchs+Dachs (Sanja Čežek and Dušan Čežek). They came up with the idea in late 2017 when they saw a video about the Berlin Wall. Škorňok and Melicherík previously worked together as programmers at various start-up web services. They wished to make video games, but because they are both programmers they made a small text game. They decided to find artists for their new game. They came across the pixel art work of Sanja Čežek and her husband Dušan Čežek. They liked their work on browser game A Midsummer Night's Dream: Replayed and they offered collaboration. The Čežeks worked at the time on the video game whose development was at the time terminated, so they agreed. Škorňok and Melicherík joined forces with Sanja and Dušan and Twin Petes was merged into Ministry of Broadcast Studio.

Original MOB game was meant to be an arena shooter, but after the teams joined forces, they completely redesigned it into cinematic platformer with a strong narrative.

During the development, Ministry of Broadcast Studio partnered with publisher Hitcents who agreed to publish Ministry of Broadcast on Steam and Nintendo Switch. The game was released for Steam on 30 January 2020. The Nintendo Switch version was released in Japan on May 7, 2020.

== Reception ==
Reception

Aggregate scores
Aggregator	Score
Metacritic	67/100
OpenCritic	58% recommend

Ministry of Broadcast won Best Gameplay and was nominated for Best Art at 2018 Game Access.
