= Hitcents =

American video game publisher and developer

- Type: Private
- Industry: Video games
- Founded: 1999
- Founder: Chris Mills; Clinton Mills
- Headquarters: Bowling Green, Kentucky, U.S.
- Divisions: Game Development and Publishing, Web Development, IT
- Website: hitcents.com

Hitcents is a video game publisher and mobile app and games studio, headquartered in Bowling Green, Kentucky. They are the creators of the cross-platform gaming series Draw A Stickman. In 2014, Hitcents partnered with actor Tom Hanks to develop the Hanx Writer. Founded in 1999 as a software company by twin brothers Chris and Clinton Mills, the company has offices in Los Angeles and San Francisco.

== History ==
As high school sophomores, Chris and Clinton Mills started Hitcents as an internet advertising company. The company name referred to the policy of paying clients on a cents-per-hit basis. Hitcents was acquired by Houchens Industries in 2003. The company expanded from its headquarters in Bowling Green, Kentucky to San Francisco in April, 2014 and Los Angeles in 2015.

The business includes mobile game and application development, e-commerce, technology, marketing, creative design, software development, production, automation, self-service checkout, and enterprise resource planning.

In 2007, Hitcents was ranked No. 191 on Inc. magazine's list of the top 500 fastest-growing private companies in the U.S., after growing 1,099.8% over 3 years. Clinton and Chris Mills were also ranked in the top 5 CEOs under 30. In 2013, the company moved from its offices at Western Kentucky University into a building called "The Wrap" in Bowling Green, which was developed by the Mills family's real estate business. Hitcents was named one of the best places to work in Kentucky for 2014.

After contractors on the building said the family's real estate business owed them more than $2 million, the county took over the project and the company moved out in August 2015.

Hitcents, as of today, no longer has a game department, and they are not working on game projects, this was announced around 2023–2024 by one of the Hitcents moderators through the official Hitcents Discord Server.

== Mobile application development ==
Hitcents develops mobile applications for both in-house and client projects. These applications vary in genre: from mobile games to enterprise-level business applications.

=== Draw a Stickman series ===
Hitcents created the series Draw a Stickman. The idea started as a simple website, DrawAStickman.com. After it was a critical and commercial success, the game was later developed into a full series of mobile and PC games. Draw a Stickman: Epic was released in October 2012, a mobile application for iOS, Android, Kindle, Windows 7 and 8 phones, and later into full desktop versions for Windows 8, Linux, Mac OS X and Steam.

A player creates a stick figure, which becomes the main character of the game. Throughout the game, the player guides the stick figure through multiple levels, utilizing various pencils to draw elements, tools, and weapons to solve puzzles and overcome obstacles.

In July 2015, Hitcents launched a sequel to Draw A Stickman: Epic, Draw A Stickman: Epic 2.

A 3rd game titled Draw a Stickman: Epic 3 was released on mobile in May 2020 with a console & PC port in March 2023.

=== Battlepillars ===
Hitcents created Battlepillars, a tug-of-war real-time strategy game for iOS, Android, and PC. The game was launched on October 2, 2013. Battlepillars allows players to strategically build and command caterpillars, which are then sent to battle an enemy caterpillar army and various bosses. The game allows users to build each caterpillar in their army using specialized segments that offer various powers and abilities.

Battlepillars was one of the first mobile cross-platform multiplayer games, allowing Android user to play against iOS users through Google Play. Battlepillars was Hitcents' first free-to-play mobile game.

=== Hanx Writer ===
Hitcents created Hanx Writer, a mobile app in collaboration with Tom Hanks. Inspired by Tom Hanks' appreciation for classic typewriters, the Hanx Writer App reflects the look, feel, and sound of old-fashioned word-processing.

Hanx Writer was released on August 14, 2014. Hanx Writer reached the No. 1 ranking on the iTunes App Store during its launch week, where it held the top spot in both the Productivity section and the Overall section.

=== Rigged ===
On September 16, 2016, Hitcents launched Rigged, a mobile game about gerrymandering, in partnership with Fusion. The game play was centered around educating players about the practice of gerrymandering in the United States.

=== The Godfather: Family Dynasty ===
On February 9, 2017, Hitcents launched an officially-licensed, free-to-play, mobile strategy game based on The Godfather.

The game received mostly positive reception. The game was praised for its art style, gameplay, and multiplayer functionality. However, it was criticized for being unoriginal and for its repetitive gameplay.

=== NBA Life ===
On March 30, 2017, Hitcents launched NBA Life, a free-to-play mobile strategy and simulation game where one plays as a new NBA player on a team of one's choice. A player improves an avatar's body and skills so the player can compete with AI versions of real-life players. Players can join with other players in crews for various rewards. After joining a crew, the player can face off with other crews in the crew tournament system.

The game received very positive reviews. Reviewers praised the game for its gameplay and aesthetic. Many reviewers also appreciated that the in-game NBA player avatar can be female.

== Video game publishing ==
Hitcents is a video game publisher. In 2018, they published two games developed by other indie video game studios.

=== A Robot Named Fight ===
Hitcents published A Robot Named Fight, a 2D action figure game developed by Matt Bitner Games. The game was released on April 26, 2018, for the Nintendo Switch platform. In A Robot Named Fight players are robots tasked with defeating Megabeast while exploring a labyrinth where you can discover artifacts and power-ups.

=== Don't Sink ===
Hitcents published Don't Sink for the Nintendo Switch platform on January 3, 2019. Studio Eris developed the game in cooperation with Hitcents. Don't Sink is an adventure, pirate-themed role-playing video game where players explore the high seas, islands, and grow a pirate empire. Players must balance adventure with physical needs for the pirate crew, governing islands and expanding their empire.

== Games developed ==
Title	Year	Platform(s)
Draw a Stickman	2011	iOS, Google Play, Amazon
Draw a Stickman - Episode 2	2012	iOS, Google Play
Draw a Stickman: EPIC	2012	iOS, Google Play, Steam, Amazon, Windows & Windows Phone, Mac, Kindle, Xbox One
Battlepillars	2013	iOS, Google Play, Amazon Store, Steam, Windows & Windows Phone
The Harlem Shake	2013	iOS
Hanx Writer	2014	iOS
Krampus In Wreck The Halls	2014	Google Play
San Francisco	2014	Google Play
Poisonous Creatures	2014	Google Play
Charlie Charlie	2015	iOS, Google Play
Draw a Stickman: EPIC 2	2015	iOS, Google Play, Steam, Wii U, Nintendo Switch, Amazon, Windows, Windows Phone, PlayStation 4 & Xbox One
Draw a Stickman: Sketchbook	2015	iOS, Google Play, Amazon
Tac - Tic Tac Toe Reimagined	2015	iOS
Sparkle Corgi Goes Cave Diving	2015	Google Play, iOS
Godfather: Family Dynasty	2017	Google Play, iOS, Amazon

== Games published ==
Title	Year	Platform
A Robot Named Fight	2018	Nintendo Switch
Don't Sink	2019	Nintendo Switch
Duke of Defense	2019	Nintendo Switch
Get To The Orange Door	2019	Steam, TBA
Forgotton Anne	2019	iOS, Google Play
Rashlander	2019	Steam
Ministry of Broadcast	2020	Microsoft Windows, Nintendo Switch
Draw a Stickman: EPIC 3	2020	Steam, iOS, Google Play
Shores Unknown	2021	Steam, Nintendo Switch, TBA
Inspector Waffles	2021	Steam, Nintendo Switch, TBA
Aquamarine	2021	Steam, TBA
Kokopa's Atlas	TBA	Steam, TBA

== Services ==
Hitcents web development services include web design, programming and maintenance, administrative access, eCommerce, data transfer and website hosting. Hitcents web department has been recognized over the years with numerous awards for their website work including Marcom Awards, Davey Awards and Communicator Awards.

Other services include consulting, data backup, hardware purchasing, virtual private network setup, secure DSL, kiosk development, computer networking and high-speed Internet access.

== Awards ==
2011

- Davey Award- Draw A Stickman- GOLD
- Dope Award- Draw A Stickman- SITE OF THE MONTH
- Design Licks- Draw A Stickman- SITE OF THE DAY
- FWA Award- Draw A Stickman- SITE OF THE DAY
- AWWWARD's- Draw A Stickman- SITE OF THE DAY
- Design Taxi- Draw A Stickman- SITE OF THE DAY

2012

- Interactive Media Award (IMA)- Draw A Stickman- BEST IN CLASS
- Hermes Creative Award- Connected Nation Corporate- GOLD
- Hermes Creative Award- Draw A Stickman- PLATINUM
- Horizon Interactive Award- Draw A Stickman- BEST IN CATEGORY
- Webby Award- Draw A Stickman- Viral Marketing- PEOPLE'S VOICE
- Webby Award- Draw A Stickman- Best Use of Motion Graphics- PEOPLE'S VOICE
- Webby Award- Draw A Stickman- Best Use of Motion Graphics- WEBBY
- The Web Award- Draw A Stickman- GAME SITE STANDARD OF EXCELLENCE
- W3 Award- Draw A Stickman- Animation- GOLD
- W3 Award- Draw A Stickman- Self Promotion- GOLD
- Innovation Award- BG Chamber of Commerce- Hitcents- AWARD
- Davey Award- BART- Animation- SILVER

2013

- Webby Award- Draw A Stickman: Epic- Mobile Sites & Apps/Games- WEBBY WINNER
- Webby Award- Draw A Stickman: Epic- PEOPLE'S VOICE
- Webby Award- One Direction Scrapbook App- HONORABLE MENTION
- W3 Award- Tampico Website- AWARD
- Manny Award- Draw A Stickman- AWARD
- Lovie Award- Draw A Stickman: EPIC- Games- GOLD
- Lovie Award- Draw A Stickman: EPIC- Tablet Games- SILVER
- Lovie Award- Draw A Stickman: EPIC- Tablet Games- PEOPLE'S LOVIE

2014

- Webby Award- Hanx Writer- HONORABLE MENTION

2015

- W3 Award- Hanx Writer- Mobile App: Entertainment- GOLD
- W3 Award- Hanx Writer- Best Visual Design: Aesthetic- SILVER
- W3 Award- Draw A Stickman: EPIC 2- Mobile App: Innovative & Experimental- SILVER

2016

- Webby Award- Draw a Stickman: Epic 2- Mobile Games- HONOREE
