= Inmost =

2019 video game

- Developer: Hidden Layer Games
- Publisher: Chucklefish
- Programmer: Andriy Vinchkovskiy
- Artist: Alexey Testov
- Composer: Alexey Nechaev
- Platforms: iOS, macOS, Windows, Nintendo Switch, Android
- Release: iOS; October 11, 2019; macOS, Windows, Switch; August 21, 2020; Android; October 28, 2025
- Genre: Platform game
- Mode: Single-player

Inmost is a puzzle-platform game developed by Lithuanian developer Hidden Layer Games and published by Chucklefish. It was released for iOS through Apple Arcade on October 11, 2019, and later ported to macOS, Microsoft Windows, Nintendo Switch, on August 21, 2020. The game follows a young girl, a knight, and an old man in search of answers. These characters are interconnected to each other in the story, which is set in two different worlds. The story has themes of pain, bonding, and loss.

On October 28, 2025, Inmost was re-released on the App Store for iOS, also becoming available for the first time on the Android platform through Google Play.

== Reception ==
Reception

Aggregate score
Aggregator	Score
Metacritic	NS: 78/100 (Note: Score based on 19 reviews.); PC: 76/100 (Note: Score based on 14 reviews.)

Review scores
Publication	Score
Destructoid	8/10
Nintendo Life	7/10
Nintendo World Report	8/10

Inmost received "generally favorable" reviews according to review aggregator Metacritic.
