= Golf Peaks =

2018 video game

- Developer(s): Afterburn
- Publisher(s): Afterburn; 7Levels (Switch, Xbox One)
- Platform(s): iOS; macOS; Windows; Android; Nintendo Switch; Xbox One
- Release: iOS, macOS, Windows; November 13, 2018; Android, Switch; March 14, 2019; Xbox One; September 21, 2021
- Genre(s): Puzzle
- Mode(s): Single-player

Golf Peaks is a puzzle video game developed and published by Afterburn. Players are challenged to solve golf-themed puzzles.

== Gameplay ==
Golf Peaks is an isometric, golf-themed puzzle game. Each map consists of a series of platforms, and players draw cards that determine how they traverse the platforms. The game implements various hazards, which provide new challenges in optimally traversing the platforms, but these hazards do not model physics; they are purely logical puzzles.

== Development ==
Afterburn said Golf Peaks recouped its development costs a week and a half after its release, which they attributed to Poland's low cost of living, being featured in the App Store, and having a short development time. Development took about five months. It was released for iOS on November 12, 2018; Windows and macOS on November 13, 2018; the Nintendo Switch on March 14, 2019; and Xbox One on September 21, 2021. 7Levels helped port it to the Switch.

== Reception ==
Reception

Aggregate score
Aggregator	Score
Metacritic	Switch: 78/100

The Switch version of Golf Peaks received positive reviews on Metacritic. Nintendo Life called it "fun and engaging" but said it is a bit short. The Verge wrote, "The puzzles are well-crafted, and the game is so relaxing to play that I don't want to stop." Pocket Gamer praised its balanced levels and called it "a pretty magnificent experience" held back only by its lack of further content. Digitally Downloaded recommended it for times when one only has periods of time to play games, but they said it has "somewhat limited" gameplay during longer sessions. Although he was disappointed in the lack of in-game hints for the most challenging puzzles, NintendoWorldReport's reviewer said that it is "a nice, serene, and challenging way to wind down".

It was nominated for best mobile game at the 2019 Central & Eastern European Game Awards.
