= Mordhau (video game) =

2019 multiplayer fighting video game

- Developer: Triternion
- Publisher: Triternion
- Engine: Unreal Engine 4
- Platforms: Windows; PlayStation 4 PlayStation 5 Xbox One; Xbox Series X/S
- Release: Windows; 29 April 2019; PS4, PS5, Xbox One, Xbox Series X/S; 12 July 2023
- Genres: Fighting, hack 'n' slash
- Mode: Multiplayer

Mordhau is a multiplayer medieval hack and slash fighting game developed by the independent Slovenian studio Triternion, with a prominent aspect of skill-based competitive play and customization. It features a combat system emphasizing hand-to-hand combat, loosely based on historical techniques such as feints, redirection, and alternative use of weapons. Other features include ranged weapons, siege engines and mounted combat. The game was released on 29 April 2019 for Windows via Steam. Versions for PlayStation 4, PlayStation 5, Xbox One, and Xbox Series X/S were released on 12 July 2023.

The game was partially financed through a Kickstarter campaign in 2017, raising nearly $300,000.

== Gameplay ==
In Mordhau, players engage in hand-to-hand combat with medieval weapons such as swords, spears, shields, hammers, bows, siege weapons and more. When in close-quarters combat, players can defeat their opponents by utilizing techniques like directional strikes, stabbing, kicking, dodging, blocking, and parrying while watching their health and stamina bars. Players may ride horses in battle. The game can be played in either first person perspective or third person perspective.

=== Customization ===
Outside of gameplay, the player can edit and create mercenaries for most game modes. When creating or editing, the player can change their mercenary's body type, face, and voice for cosmetic purposes. Editing things like armor, weapons, and perks cost in-game points. Depending on what type of armor the player has it can affect the movement speed of the player like how wearing heavier armor will make the player move slower and cost more points, while there are only three levels of armor there are also cosmetic variations for armor. All weapons point values are roughly determined by the size of weapon as a light dagger would not be as costly as a heavy hammer. The perk system will grant the mercenary various passive abilities at the cost of points, which scale based on how ideally useful the perks are.

=== Game modes ===
- Frontline: In this game mode, up to 64 players form into two teams. Each team starts with 1000 points, and competes with the other team to earn more points by fighting each other, capturing opposing territory and completing the team's objectives. For every enemy defeated, the other team loses a point. Capturing central or enemy territory reduces the opposing team's points. However, completing the team's objective will instantly end the game in favor of whichever team completed their objective.
- Invasion: In this game mode, up to 64 players form into two teams, with one team acting as attackers and the other as defenders. The defenders must protect key objectives while the attackers must complete them to advance further. Once objectives are captured, the defenders must fall back to defend the next objective. The game is on a timer, which increases when the attackers secure an objective. The defenders win if the timer runs down to zero, while the attackers win if all objectives are completed within that time.
- Battle Royale: In this game mode, 64 players compete against each other in a free-for-all match. When a player is defeated, they will lose the game and not spawn again. The last player standing will be the winner. At the start of the game, all players will spawn without weapons or armor. They must seek out chests containing equipment in order to increase their chance of survival. To avoid stalemates, a ring surrounds the entire map, and will slowly shrink to bring the players closer to each other. The game mode was, however taken down.
- Horde: In this game mode, a small team of players is pitted against waves of computer-controlled enemies that will get increasingly harder each wave. Players will start with no weapons or armor, and their health will not regenerate normally. To regenerate health and earn weapons, the player must defeat the enemies and survive the round. Defeating an enemy will award the player a quarter of their health and currency. Completing a wave will refill the player's health and award currency. Currency is used to purchase weapons and armor. All purchasable equipment is scattered all over the map, needing the player to have extensive knowledge of places like item locations. On April 29th, 2024, the horde game mode was updated to Demon Horde which took the original horde game mode and added an array of new weapons, maps, and enemies. The Demon Horde update also made changes to inventory systems and the horde skill tree.
- Skirmish: This game is in the form of a team deathmatch; however, when a player is defeated, they will not spawn for the rest of the round. The last team standing will win the round and play will continue until one team has won 7 rounds. As of the removal of Battle Royale, this mode is now available through the Brawl option of the fight menu
- Deathmatch: This game mode has everyone fight against each other with no teams or in a free-for-all. The first player to score the target amount of kills will win the game. Many Deathmatch servers are duel-only (private) servers, where two players must emote at each other to initiate a duel, the emote used most often is the Flourish emote which is a basic sword twirl. Ever since the removal of Battle Royale, Deathmatch is available through the Brawl option of the fight menu
- Team Deathmatch: This game mode is similar to deathmatch, except that the player will form two even teams and will compete for the most kills of players on the other team. As with Deathmatch and Skirmish, it is available through the Brawl option of the fight menu
- Swordgame: This game mode is similar to deathmatch, except that each player will start with the same weapon and will change or improve to other weapons with each subsequent kill of an enemy, each new weapon is unlocked only by earning a kill with the weapon you most recently upgraded to. In order to win, a player must get a kill with each of the 20 weapons provided in the game mode.

== Development ==
The game was built using Unreal Engine 4.

Marko Grgurovič, a Slovene PhD student of computer science at the University of Primorska, began development of Mordhau alone. With no experience in game development, Grgurovič had begun building a prototype in Unity called Project Slasher. After working on Project Slasher with another person for two years, the team decided to remake the entire project, as it was not up to their standards. During the next three years, Grgurovič was joined by other programmers, graphic designers, and animators from all over the world, many of whom enjoyed playing video games like Chivalry: Medieval Warfare and wanted to make something similar. This led to them founding the company Triternion, and producing first versions. In this time period, the development team switched from using Unity to Unreal Engine, and renamed the project to Mordhau.

In March 2017, the company launched a Kickstarter campaign to raise funds for development and achieved fundraising goals in less than 24 hours. The game was released on 29 April 2019 on Steam. Mordhau was released for Playstation 4, Playstation 5, Xbox One, and Xbox Series X/S on 12 July 2023.

== Reception ==
=== Critical reception ===
Reception

Aggregate score
Aggregator	Score
Metacritic	81/100

Review scores
Publication	Score
Destructoid	7.5/10
Game Informer	8.5/10
GameSpot	8/10
IGN	8.2/10
Jeuxvideo.com	16/20
PC Gamer (US)	84/100

Mordhau has a score of 81 on Metacritic based on 21 critic reviews. Prior to release, Mordhau received praise from early reviewers for its fighting system, the chaotic but fun gameplay, and its graphics.

Reviewers enjoyed the game's intricate fighting system. James Swinbanks of GameSpot called it a "strategic, punishing and ultimately satisfying" video game. Destructoid's Patrick Hancock found it "exciting to find efficient and unique combos" that led to players developing their own unique play style. IGN's Samuel Horti enjoyed the "feeling of constant skill progression" as he gradually learnt the game's mechanics through experience and video tutorials. Javy Gwaltney of Game Informer shared this feeling, saying that "every increment of improvement is rewarded with spectacular displays of violence". However, GameSpot and IGN also shared the belief that the game's in-game tutorial could have done a better job of explaining the game's mechanics to new players. Swinbanks wrote that Mordhau did not provide adequate feedback to strikes, which made the game feel like a "slow, merciless grind of death after death" as you learned how to play. Horti wished that the game's tutorial would help him "learn by playing instead of turning to YouTube guides". T.J. Hafer from PC Gamer worried that the game's complexity might alienate players who wanted to play a supporting role in battle, stating that Mordhau "doesn't support that playstyle especially well".

In a July 2019 article in PC Gamer, Samuel Horti described Mordhau's player base as having toxicity problems, claiming that many players who use homophobic, racist or sexist language in the game or on Mordhau's forums were not adequately punished by Triternion. He criticized Triternion's hands-off approach to word filtering and player banning in order to avoid claims of censorship. Horti also criticized Triternion's proposed approach to handling female and non-white characters in upcoming expansions. He quoted a Triternion artist who, when asked about character diversity, stated that the developers would "give [the players] the option to enable and disable different things". When prompted by PC Gamer for clarification, a Mordhau developer confirmed the stance, saying "it depends how [the Mordhau] community is in the future". A Mordhau moderator's post on Mordhau's Steam community forums dated April 2019 stated that the developers "might add a simple client-side toggle" for players concerned about character realism. Subsequently, Triternion released a statement on Twitter, denying that they had considered adding the option for players to disable characters based on their ethnicity. On 3 July, the company reaffirmed via a post on their own forums that they were not going to add those options, saying that "our official stance is that these toggle options are out of the question". Triternion elaborated that the idea was briefly discussed and ultimately discarded, but that the employees that PC Gamer interviewed were not aware of the final decision. The controversy was picked up by many major gaming sites.

=== Sales ===
Mordhau became a success, selling 200,000 copies in less than a week, then exceeding 500,000 copies sold by 7 May. It reached the top of the Steam sales charts. Triternion apologized after its servers could not sustain the massive influx of players. About a month after its release, Mordhau had sold 1 million copies; to celebrate, the developers released a new map alongside new weapons and cosmetics.
