= Machinarium 2 =

Upcoming puzzle adventure game

- Developer: Amanita Design
- Publisher: Amanita Design
- Designer: Jakub Dvorský
- Composer: Tomáš Dvořák
- Platforms: Windows; macOS
- Genres: Adventure, Puzzle
- Mode: Single-player

Machinarium 2 is an upcoming point-and-click puzzle adventure video game developed and published by Amanita Design. It is the sequel to Machinarium (2009) - a highly-rated graphic adventure game, featuring similar design and gameplay as its sequel. Machinarium 2 was announced on 8 October 2026, during The Triple-i Initiative showcase.

== Gameplay ==
In Machinarium 2, the goal of the player is to solve a series of point-and-click puzzles and brain teasers, interacting with characters and objects in the game world. The game retains the hand-drawn visual style and non-verbal storytelling associated with its predecessor.

The player can freely switch between protagonists Josef and Berta to complete various puzzles, with each character having unique abilities and interacting with the environment in different ways.

== Plot ==
Following the events of Machinarium, Josef and Berta escape from the city of Machinarium in a helicopter, but crash in a desolate area. They descend from a nearby cliff into a hidden valley inhabited by two robot tribes: one in the Elektrona monastery and the other in the city of Oilton, both of them facing a grim future as their power is slowly running out. One tribe lives in a monastery high in the mountains, while the other occupies a city below. Both communities are gradually running out of energy.

== Development ==
Machinarium 2, like its prequel, is developed by Czech independent studio Amanita Design known for games like Chuchel, Botanicula, Samorost and Happy Game. The game was officially announced on October 8, 2026, during The Triple-i Initiative, after more than 17 years from the release of the first game. Jakub Dvorský, the CEO of Amanita Design, jokingly stated that "We're not getting any younger, and the world seems to be ending, so if we were ever going to make Machinarium 2, now is the right time." Tomas Dvorak (known under pseudonym Floex), who composed the soundtrack for the first game, is working on the official soundtrack for the sequel too. Dvorak stated that he does not think of Machinarium 2 as a sequel, viewing it as a different unique project where he can "have fun" and try not to think about comparing it to the original game.
