= Game Masters (exhibition) =

Video game exhibition

Game Masters: The Exhibition was an exhibition curated by the Australian Centre for the Moving Image (ACMI). The exhibition was designed to highlight the key designers who have had a large influence on video games and video game culture. Following the showing at ACMI, the exhibition began to tour internationally. Conrad Bodman, who also curated Game On, was the curator of the exhibition.

The exhibition included over 125 playable games from over 30 different designers, as well as concept and development artwork. Interview events with game designers were hosted on location by ABC's Stephanie "Hex" Bendixsen.

== International tour venues ==
Venue	City	Country	Start date	End date
Australian Centre for the Moving Image	Melbourne	Australia	28 June 2012	28 October 2012
Museum of New Zealand Te Papa Tongarewa	Wellington	New Zealand	15 December 2012	28 April 2013
Powerhouse Museum	Sydney	Australia	13 December 2013	25 May 2014
National Museum of Scotland	Edinburgh	Scotland	5 December 2014	20 April 2015
Halmstad Arena	Halmstad	Sweden	28 May 2015	31 August 2015
Oregon Museum of Science and Industry	Portland	USA	13 February 2016	8 May 2016
COSI	Columbus	USA	11 June 2016	5 September 2016
Museum für Kunst und Gewerbe Hamburg	Hamburg	Germany	14 November 2016	23 April 2017
Fleet Science Center	San Diego	USA	1 July 2017	18 January 2018
The Franklin Institute	Philadelphia	USA	31 March 2018	3 September 2018
Science Museum of Minnesota	St Paul	USA	15 February 2019	5 May 2019
National Film and Sound Archive	Canberra	Australia	27 September 2019	9 March 2020

== Games exhibited ==
The exhibition showcased the work of over 30 notable video game designers, and featured over 125 playable games, including original arcade games that are hard to find in working condition. Also displayed were concept and development artwork, and interview events with the game designers. The exhibition was divided into three sections: "Arcade Heroes" (highlighting games from the golden age of arcade video games), "Game Changers" (highlighting the works of paradigm-shifting game designers that greatly influenced later designers), and "Indies" (featuring indie games).

Arcade Heroes
Designer	Games
Dave Theurer	Tempest, and Missile Command
Ed Logg	Asteroids, and Centipede
Eugene Jarvis	Defender, and Robotron: 2084
Masanobu Endo	Xevious, and Tower of Druaga
Shigeru Miyamoto	Donkey Kong
Tim Skelly	Reactor, and Rip Off
Tomohiro Nishikado	Space Invaders, and Gun Fight
Toru Iwatani	Pac-Man, and Gee Bee
Konami	Scramble
Taito	Elevator Action

Game Changers
Designer	Games
Alex Rigopulos & Eran Egozy	Dance Central 3, Frequency, Amplitude, and Rock Band
Blizzard Entertainment	Starcraft 2, Diablo 3, and Warcraft III: The Frozen Throne
Fumito Ueda	Ico, and Shadow of the Colossus
TT Games	Lego Star Wars II: The Original Trilogy, Lego Star Wars III: The Clone Wars, Lego Batman: The Videogame, Lego Harry Potter: Years 1–4
Paulina Bozek	SingStar Vol. 2 (PS3)
Peter Molyneux	Populous, Dungeon Keeper, Black & White, and Fable III
SEGA	Columns, Alex Kidd in Miracle World, Streets of Rage 2, Phantasy Star IV: The End of the Millennium, Altered Beast, and Golden Axe
Sonic Team	Sonic the Hedgehog, Sonic the Hedgehog 2, Sonic Adventure, Nights into Dreams, and Sonic Forces
Tetsuya Mizuguchi	Sega Rally Championship, Space Channel 5, Rez, Lumines, and Child of Eden (2D)
Tim Schafer	Maniac Mansion: Day of the Tentacle, Monkey Island 2: LeChuck's Revenge, Broken Age, Psychonauts, and Brütal Legend
Warren Spector	System Shock, Deus Ex, Disney Epic Mickey, and Ultima Underworld
Will Wright	SimCity, SimCity 2000, The Sims 3, and Spore
Yu Suzuki	Hang-On, OutRun, Virtua Fighter, and Shenmue

Indie
Designer	Games
Capybara Games	Critter Crunch, and Superbrothers: Sword & Sworcery EP
Chocolate Liberation Front	Game Masters: The Game
The Behemoth	Alien Hominid, and Castle Crashers
Bennett Foddy	QWOP, and Getting Over It with Bennett Foddy
Eric Chahi	Another World, Heart of Darkness, and From Dust
Halfbrick	Fruit Ninja, and Jetpack Joyride
Introversion Software	Darwinia, and Defcon
Jakub Dvorsky	Samorost 2, Machinarium, and Botanicula
Jonathan Blow	Braid
Markus 'Notch' Persson	Minecraft
Masaya Matsuura	Vib-Ribbon and Parappa the Rapper
Mountains	Florence
Rovio	Angry Birds
State of Play Games	Lumino City
thatgamecompany	Flow, Flower, and Journey
Ustwo Games	Monument Valley
