= Attentat 1942 =

2017 Czech WWII video game

- Developers: Charles University; Czech Academy of Sciences
- Publishers: Charles University; Czech Academy of Sciences
- Platforms: Macintosh, Windows, Linux, Android, iOS, iPadOS
- Release: WW: October 31, 2017
- Genres: Adventure, Educational
- Mode: Single-player

Attentat 1942 is a Czech point-and-click adventure game developed by Charles University and the Czech Academy of Sciences. Based on true events, players investigate the protagonist's family history and learn the truth about various events that took place Nazi-occupied Czech lands during World War II. The game received positive reviews upon its release and won multiple accolades, including Czech Game of the Year from the Czech Game of the Year Awards. A sequel, Svoboda 1945: Liberation, was released in 2021.

== Premise ==
During World War II, Jindřich Jelínek was arrested by the Gestapo shortly after the assassination of Reinhard Heydrich, ruler of the Nazi-occupied Czech lands and the leading architect of the Holocaust. Players take on the role of a grandchild of Jelínek, and seek to uncover what role he played in the assassination, as well as the reason for his arrest. Throughout the investigation, players interview eyewitnesses, discover the family's backstory, and learn more about life in the Protectorate of Bohemia and Moravia.

== Development ==
The game was developed by Charles University and the Czech Academy of Sciences. It is the first game in the Czechoslovakia 38-89 project, which covers different events from contemporary history. Attentat 1942 is a significantly enhanced version of the game "Československo 38-89: Atentát", which was released in Czech in 2015, adapted and changed for an international audience. Revenues from the game are to be invested into the continuing research and science in their field. The core development team is composed of the lead game designer, Vít Šisler (from the Faculty of Arts), the lead programmer, Jakub Gemrot (from the Faculty of Mathematics and Physics), art director Richard Alexander, and students from Charles University and historians from the Institute of Contemporary History of the Czech Academy of Sciences. The illustrations were created by Peter Novák (Ticho 762), and the music was composed by the band DVA, which also created soundtracks for the games Botanicula and Chuchel. The game was released for Windows and Mac on Steam on October 31, 2017. Subsequent Linux version was made available in Spring 2020 as well as mobile/tablet versions in summer that year. The game is available in Czech, with English, Russian, and German subtitles.

=== Release ===
The game was released on Steam in October 2017. It was available worldwide, except for Germany, where it was banned due to German laws barring games containing Nazi symbols. In May 2018, Attentat 1942 won the "Most Amazing Game" Award at the A MAZE. festival in Berlin, although attendees could not play it. In August 2018, the policy of USK, the authority providing age ratings for video games, was changed to allow games with Nazi symbolism to receive age ratings, depending on their individual "social adequacy". Attentat 1942 was released in Germany as the first PC game with Nazi symbolism with the USK age rating after the policy change.

== Reception ==
The game received "generally favorable" reviews from critics, according to review aggregator website Metacritic, where it holds a score of 76 based on fourteen reviews.

Rock Paper Shotgun stated that Attentat 1942 "captivates from start to finish by humanizing history brilliantly." Destructoid's review was also positive: "Attentat 1942 will be a treasure not only for a fresh perspective on a widely reported period of time but also for the amount of work that you can see the developers put into making sure their story fit within the confines of history."

=== Accolades ===
- "Most Amazing Game" at A MAZE festival in Germany.
- "Best Learning Game" at Games for Change in the U.S.
- "Excellence in Narrative" nomination at Independent Games Festival in the U.S.
- Second place at the Game Development World Championship in Finland
- "Czech Game of the Year" at the 2017 Czech Game of the Year Awards
- "Educational Game" at The Independent Game Developers' Association Awards 2018 in the UK

== Sequel ==
A sequel, Svoboda 1945: Liberation, was released in 2021. The game retains the same gameplay elements from its predecessor and is explores events during the end of World War II. Svoboda 1945 was developed by the newly created Charles Games, a studio created under Charles University and consisting of members of the same team that worked on Attentat 1942. The game received similar praise as its predecessor, likewise winning "Czech Game of the Year" awarded by the Czech Game of the Year Awards.
