= The Tiny Bang Story =

2011 video game

- Developer: Colibri Games
- Publisher: Colibri Games
- Programmer: Dmitriy Sannikov
- Artist: Eduard Arutyunyan
- Engine: Playground SDK
- Platforms: Windows macOS; Linux iPad 2 Android; Windows Phone; Nintendo Switch
- Release: 22 April 2011: Windows, macOS 22 April 2011 iOS, Android March 2012 Linux June 2015 AppleTV 2 February 2016 Nintendo Switch 3 March 2019
- Genre: Graphic adventure
- Mode: Single-player

The Tiny Bang Story (Russian: Теория крошечного взрыва) is a puzzle point-and-click adventure game developed and released by Colibri Games. It was first released for Windows and macOS on Steam. In the years that followed, the game was ported to iOS, Android, Linux, AppleTV, and Nintendo Switch. A port to Windows Phone had also existed.

== Gameplay ==
The Tiny Bang Story takes place on an unnamed planet that was shattered into numerous jigsaw pieces by the explosion of a nearby soccer-shaped asteroid. The player is tasked with rebuilding the planet by collecting the missing pieces hidden throughout the game.

The game is progressed through completing a total of 30 puzzles. Some puzzles may be attempted upon first encounter, but most puzzles in the game require the player to collect additional hidden objects to unlock.

Notably, The Tiny Bang Story contains no spoken or written text except in menus. The player interacts with non-player characters only through visual cues. The game's hints system is diegetic, revealing the location of hidden objects through movements of a flying insect. Basic instructions for individual puzzles are also given through captionless illustrations.

== Development ==
The Tiny Bang Story was developed by Colibri Games, an independent game development studio based in Russia. Eduard Arutyunyan is the artist for the game, and Dmitriy Sannikov is the programmer. Andrey Arutyunyan was later added to the team to handle the business aspects. The art of the game was inspired by Dutch classic art, and the video game Machinarium by Amanita Design.

== Reception ==
Reception

Aggregate scores
Aggregator	Score
GameRankings	(PC) 58%
Metacritic	(PC) 63/100

Review scores
Publication	Score
Adventure Gamers	2/5
Gamezebo	4.5/5
Rock Paper Shotgun	7/10

The Tiny Bang Story received mixed reviews on release. The average score on critic aggregate site Metacritic is 63/100, and 58% on GameRankings. Reviewers unanimously applaud the hand-drawn art style, calling it "gorgeous" or "absolutely stunning",. However most reviewers criticise the short playtime. Rock Paper Shotgun considers "hidden object games as potentially great puzzles, and The Tiny Bang Story is a superb piece of evidence for that", and subsequently declaring it the #20 "Best Puzzle Games Ever Made". XGN and Adventure Gamers feels the puzzles are "easy" and "repetitive". GamePitt notes that the "easiness makes the game suitable for the whole family, including younger children".
