= Dračí Historie =

1995 video game

- Developer: NoSense
- Publisher: Vochozka Trading
- Writer: Pavel Pospíšil
- Composer: Radovan Kramář
- Platform: MS-DOS
- Release: 1995
- Genre: Point-and-click adventure
- Mode: Single-player

Dračí historie (English: Dragon History) is a point-and-click adventure game for MS-DOS developed in the Czech Republic by NoSense. It was published on CD-ROM in 1995 by Vochozka Trading. It was the first Czech game to include dubbing The dubbing was also translated into Polish and subtitles were translated into English and German. The game was last updated in 2006.

== Plot ==
The game centres around a teen dragon named Bert. He lives with his father Herbert and mother Berta. Bert's father leaves to look for treasure. In his absence, Bert befriends the evil magic wand Evelyn. His father did not return for a long time, and the wand also disappeared. Therefore, Bert decides to find them.

== Development ==
Early development commenced in 1994, by a group called NoSense, consisting of students at Masaryk University, in Brno, Czech Republic. The team consisted of programmers Pavel Pospíšil, Lukáš Svoboda and Robert Špalek; graphic artists Jakub Dvorský, Pavel Jura and Jan Pokorný; and musician Radovan Kramář. These students knew members of the small development team Pterodon, which had been responsible for Tajemství Oslího ostrova, a noted success at the time. Hoping to outdo the Pterodon team, the team grew and eventually consisted of seven people. During 1994 and early 1995, NoSense focused on finding artists and writing a story. Active development began in mid-1995. The game was designed to be a grotesque adventure with unbridled jokes, and contained forty locations.

== Release ==
Published in Christmas 1995, the game sold 7000 copies, becoming one of the best selling Czech games. In addition, it was the first-ever title to be released in the Czech Republic on CD. The CD version was the first Czech game to include amateur Czech dubbing, a breakthrough for the Czech game industry. 11 years later, the game was made available under the GPL License and was free to download after this point.

NoSense followed the game with 1997's Asmodeus, which was worked on by Jakub Dvorský, who had also contributed to Dračí historie and later founded the Czech development company Amanita Design.

11 years after the game's original release in 2006, the game was revised for the first time, when Roberta Špalka cleaned it up ready for a remastered version which was released as freeware. In the summer of 2009, Denis Kasak completed an initial port of the game into C++ as part of the ScummVM project, during Google Summer of Code'09 (with Špalek as the mentor). The port was then completed by Špalek. In 2010 he cleaned the game scripts and graphics in order to make it easier to translate to other languages, while the English, German, and Polish versions were refined.

== Reception ==
The game received mostly positive reviews from critics in 1995. The lowest rating was 60% from Score, while the highest was 92% from Riki.

A review on Freegame.cz written in 2006 commented that the technical processing still held up. Tiscali.cz said that while the game was disappointing, it was nevertheless a turning point for the Czech game scene. Gry Online felt the game was humorous and targeted at children. Databaze-her.cz thought the title had pleasant cartoon graphics and humorous dialogues. In 2006, Bonusweb gave the game a rating of 80%, commenting that it had lost virtually nothing of its attractiveness. FreeHry.cz described it as a "true nostalgic memory of old good adventures". In 2010, Root.cz deemed it a blast from the past, yet still fun to play.

The game sold 7,000 copies in 1995, one of the best-selling Czech games at the time. Between 1995 and 1999, approximately 10 to 15 thousand official copies were sold.

== See also ==
- Video games in the Czech Republic
