= Jakub Dvorský =

Czech game developer

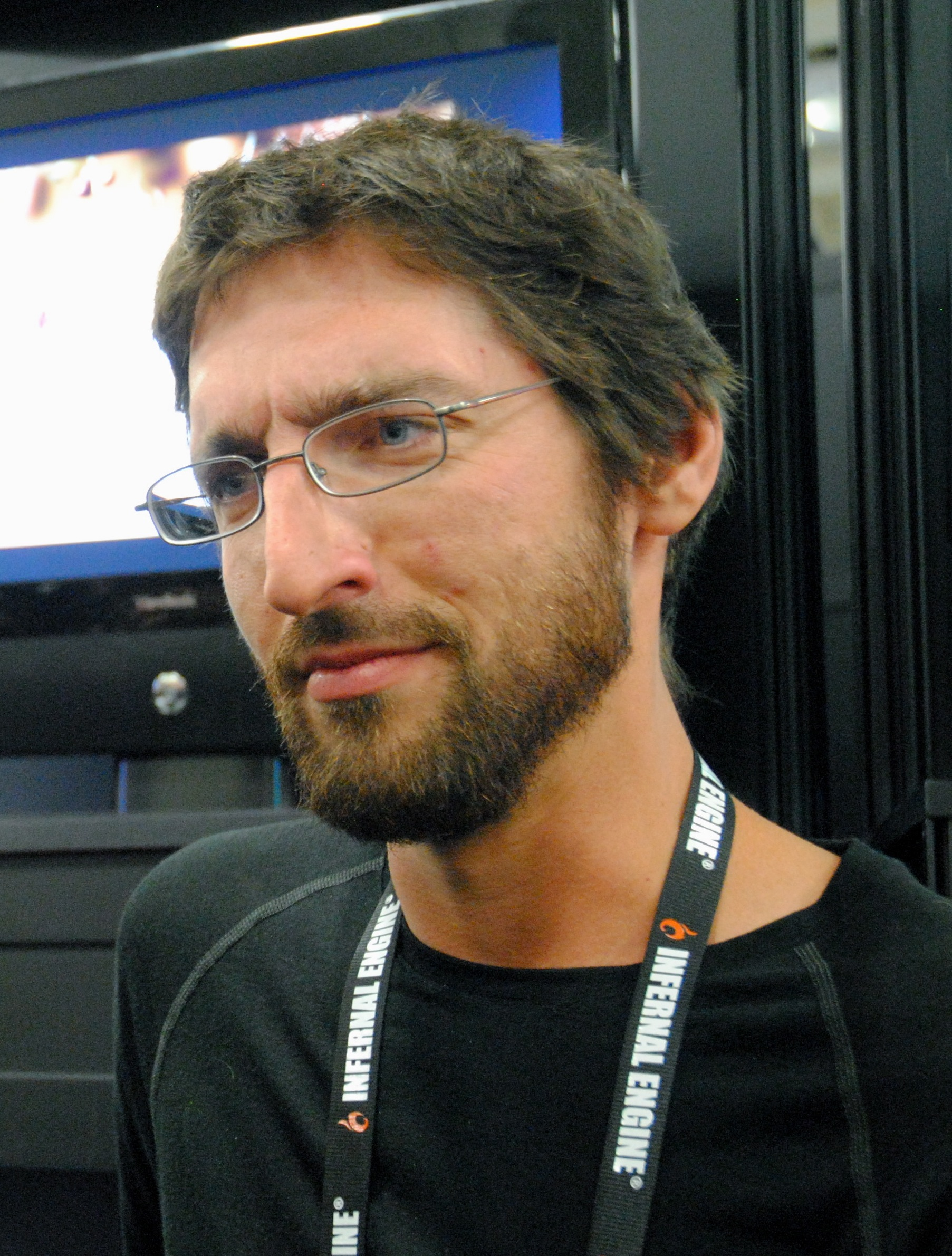
Dvorský in 2012

Jakub Dvorský (born August 19, 1978) is a designer and video game creator from Brno, Czech Republic. In 2003, he founded Amanita Design, a small independent game developing studio based in the Czech Republic.

== Life and career ==
Between 1994–1997, he was part of video game studio NoSense. He participated in development of projects Dračí Historie ("Dragon History"), Katapult ("Catapult") and Asmodeus: Tajemný kraj Ruthaniolu ("Asmodeus: Mysterious Country of Ruthaniol"). The studio was defunct in 1997. In the years 1997–2003, he studied at the Academy of Arts, Architecture and Design in Prague. He was taught by Jiří Barta.

In 2003, he established the company Amanita Design and released his first project Samorost ("Maverick"). Amanita Design was partially made from former NoSense staff. The studio develops games in Flash. Most of the projects were Point-and-click adventure games. Dvorský worked on projects such as Samorost 2, Machinarium, and Samorost 3, which was released on March 24, 2016 after five years in development. His latest game, Happy Game, was released 2021. He also worked on animated film Kooky for which he gained nomination for Český lev

=== Games ===
- Dragon History - (1995)
- Katapult - (1996)
- Asmodeus - (1997)
- Samorost (2003)
- Rocketman VC – game for Nike (2004)
- Samorost 2 (2005)
- The Quest for the Rest – game for The Polyphonic Spree (2006)
- Questionaut – educational game for BBC (2008)
- Machinarium (2009)
- Botanicula (2012)
- Samorost 3 (2016)
- Chuchel (2018)
- Pilgrims (2019)
- Creaks (2020)
- Happy Game (2021)
- Phonopolis (2026)
- Machinarium 2 (TBA)
- Bubblegum (TBA)
- The Curious Life of Theodor Hoffman – Collaboration game whit Uncanny studio (TBA)

=== Awards ===
Machinarium won the award for the Best Indie Game 2009 by Gamasutra and the award for the Best Soundtrack in a video game by PC Gamer. Botanicula won a European Games Award 2012 in the category "Best European Adventure Game".
