= Kooky =

2010 Czech action comedy film

Kuky se vrací
- Directed by: Jan Svěrák
- Written by: Jan Svěrák
- Produced by: Jan Svěrák; Erik Abraham
- Starring: Oldřich Kaiser; Kristýna Nováková; Filip Čapka; Ondřej Svěrák
- Cinematography: Vladimír Smutný; Mark Bliss
- Edited by: Alois Fišárek
- Music by: Michal Novinski
- Release date: 20 May 2010
- Running time: 96 minutes
- Country: Czech Republic
- Language: Czech
- Budget: 40 million CZK
- Box office: 30 million CZK

Kooky (Czech: Kuky se vrací, literally "Kuky returns", a pun on Lassie se vrací) is a 2010 Czech action comedy film directed by Jan Svěrák. The film combines techniques of puppet animation, stop motion and live action. It tells the story of a six-year-old asthmatic boy whose parents throw his favorite toy away, an old teddy bear named Kooky. The boy, however, secretly sneaks out of the house at night (without his boots and being dressed only in his pajamas), to retrieve Kooky from the garbage can and bring him back home. Due to that, the boy gets ill. In his feverish dreams, Kooky comes to life in the landfill, escapes into a mysterious forest and begins its journey amongst the rough-and-ready creatures of the forest.

== Background ==
Jan Svěrák initially planned to create a film depicting the world viewed from the perspective of a dog who survives floods; however, he changed his plans after he retold parts of the story to his son Ondřej.

The film was inspired by the works of the Czech sculptor and painter František Skála, who refused to participate in the production. Svěrák offered collaboration on the technical development of puppets and visual effects to Jakub Dvorský from the video game company Amanita Design. The puppets in the film were manipulated by the members of the ensemble Buchty a loutky. During the post-production process, Svěrák and his team concentrated on removing the strings and wires with the help of computer animation. Kooky is technically the most complicated film by Svěrák; it contains three times more visual effects than Dark Blue World, the most expensive Czech film up to that point. In addition to fictional puppet figures, the film makes use of real animals (fox, butterfly, snail, frog etc.)

Kooky was shot at various locations in the Czech Republic: the winter scenes were filmed at Ještěd, the forest background was shot near to Bechyně and in the National Nature Reserve Voděradské bučiny, and the scenes containing sandstone rocks were filmed in Drábské světničky. Production began in autumn of 2008. It was planned for 35 days but difficulties extended the duration of the shoot to 100 days.

It is now available to watch on iTunes.

The movie was also available as part of the Humble Botanicula Debut.

== Characters ==
=== Kooky ===
Kooky (voiced by Ondřej Svěrák) is a stuffed teddy bear, the only fictional character in the film connected with the "human world". The other puppet characters are supposed to recall forest creatures rather than toys. Kooky's puppet is 21 cm tall; it was manufactured in 18 versions for the purpose of filming all the technically complicated scenes. Kooky's face is lacking facial expression.

=== Captain von Hergot ===
Captain von Hergot (voiced by Zdeněk Svěrák, Bolek Polívka in the English version) is an old forest guardian who seeks to protect Kooky. The manufacturing of Hergot's puppet was complicated; Jakub Dvorský drew hundreds of sketches of the character. The final visual appearance of the puppet is similar to a root vegetable.

=== Nightshade ===
Nightshade (in Czech: Anuška, voiced by Jiří Macháček) is an antagonist fighting against Captain von Hergot, as he himself wants to become the forest guardian. The puppet has a big mouth and it likes to eat slugs. Nightshade is the only puppet character moving its mouth during speaking and swallowing.

=== Pytlík Vidlička and Pytlík Zapík ===
Pytlík Vidlička (voiced by Petr Čtvrtníček) and Pytlík Zapík (voiced by Jiří Lábus) are the landfill guardians. They chase Kooky, who escaped from the landfill. The puppets are made of deformed plastic bottles.

== Releases, awards and nominations ==
Kooky was chosen as the official Czech Republic contestant film for the 45th Karlovy Vary International Film Festival, where it was nominated for the Crystal Globe and won the Special Jury Prize. Thereafter it won six more awards and four nominations in various international film festivals.
