= Pilgrims (video game) =

2019 adventure video game

- Developer: Amanita Design
- Publisher: Amanita Design
- Designer: Jakub Dvorský
- Composer: Floex
- Platforms: Windows iOS; Linux macOS; Nintendo Switch
- Release: 6 October 2019; Nintendo Switch; 3 November 2022; Android; 17 April 2024
- Genre: Graphic adventure
- Mode: Single-player

Pilgrims is a graphic adventure game developed and published by Amanita Design. The game was released for Linux, macOS, Windows, and Apple Arcade on 6 October 2019, Nintendo Switch on 3 November 2022, and the iOS App Store and Android devices on 17 April 2024. Pilgrims was one of the first games distributed through Apple Arcade.

== Development ==
The game was developed by a team led by Jakub Dvorský. It was in development for two years. The idea for the game came from a card mini-game found in Samorost 3.

== Gameplay ==
Pilgrims is a point-and-click adventure game. The player controls an adventurer who wants to take a boat ride, but the owner of the boat refuses to take him until he catches a bird for her. He is eventually joined by other characters (a crone, a devil, a robber and a princess). Each of them has a problem that the player has to solve in order to get the elusive bird, but also an ability to help him with his quest.

The world is made up of a collection of scenes which can be traversed using a world map. While looking at a scene, the player can click on objects to pick them up. Objects that have been collected, as well as characters who have joined the player, are represented by a deck of cards under the scene view. Cards can be dragged from the deck onto the scene in order to use them. For several problems the player can apply multiple solutions by choosing another character or another item. So the story can differ somewhat in different playthroughs.

== Reception ==
Reception

Aggregate score
Aggregator	Score
Metacritic	PC: 78/100

Review score
Publication	Score
Adventure Gamers	4.5/5

Pilgrims received positive reviews from critics. Games.cz gave it 8/10, stating that it was a nice walk through the world of Czech fairy tales and humor. Rock, Paper, Shotgun praised the game's concept and replayability value. Adventure Gamers gave Pilgrims an "excellent" rating.

=== Accolades ===
Year	Award	Category	Result	Ref.
2019	Czech Game of the Year Awards	Main Award	Won	
2019	Czech Game of the Year Awards	Audiovisual Execution	Nominated	
2020	The New York Game Awards	A-Train Award for Best Mobile Game	Nominated	
2020	Central & Eastern European Game Awards	Best mobile game	Won	
