= Poppy Ackroyd =

- Born: Bermondsey, London, England
- Occupations: Musician; composer
- Instruments: Piano; violin
- Labels: Denovali; One Little Independent

Poppy Ackroyd is a British composer, pianist and violinist and a regular member of the live project Hidden Orchestra. She is known for her "non-conformist approach to producing sounds" and while her debut album consisted of violin and piano played by Ackroyd, Resolve, incorporated improvisation from Manu Delago, Jo Quail and Mike Lesirge.

== Biography ==
Ackroyd grew up in Bermondsey in London and her father is visual artist Norman Ackroyd. When only seven, she decided that her future career would be as a pianist. Ackroyd was classically trained on violin and piano from an early age. She studied piano and composition at the University of Edinburgh and holds a master's degree in piano performance. She makes music by manipulating and multi-tracking sounds from just those two instruments.

Her debut album Escapement was released in December 2012 and a DVD – Escapement Visualised – featuring bespoke visuals by Lumen for each track on the album, was released in September 2014. Feathers, her second album, followed in November 2014 and builds on the concept behind her debut, with most of the sounds again coming from the violin and the piano; however, this time the tracks also feature other keyboard and string instruments. In 2017 she signed to Björk's label One Little Independent Records and released a mini album, Sketches in August. Sketches is an acoustic solo piano album comprising ten tracks, six of which are re-workings of tracks from Escapement and Feathers, the other four are arrangements of new tracks from latest full album Resolve. Resolve features guest instrumentalists for the first time including Manu Delago on hang, Mike Lesirge on flute and clarinets, and Jo Quail on cello.

Ackroyd is a member of Joe Acheson's live project Hidden Orchestra.

== Discography ==
- Escapement (Denovali Records, 2012)
- Escapement DVD (Denovali Records, 2012)
- Feathers (Denovali Records, 2014)
- Sketches (One Little Independent, 2017)
- Resolve (One Little Independent, 2018)
- Pause (One Little Independent, 2021)
