= Resolve (Poppy Ackroyd album) =

Studio album by Poppy Ackroyd
- Released: 2 February 2018
- Genre: Avant-garde
- Length: 47:34
- Label: One Little Independent

Poppy Ackroyd chronology
Sketches (2017)	Resolve (2018)	Pause (2021)

Professional ratings
Aggregate scores
Source	Rating
Metacritic	77/100
Review scores
Source	Rating
AllMusic	4/5 stars
Clash	8/10
Exclaim!	7/10
Loud and Quiet	8/10

Resolve is the second studio album by British musician Poppy Ackroyd. It was released on 2 February 2018, under One Little Independent Records.

== Critical reception ==
Resolve was met with "generally favorable" reviews from critics. At Metacritic, which assigns a weighted average rating out of 100 to reviews from mainstream publications, this release received an average score of 77, based on 7 reviews. Aggregator Album of the Year gave the release a 75 out of 100 based on a critical consensus of 7 reviews.

== Track listing ==
Resolve track listing
No.	Title	Length
1.	"Paper"	4:34
2.	"Light"	5:20
3.	"The Calm Before"	6:09
4.	"Resolve"	4:16
5.	"Quail"	4:54
6.	"The Dream"	5:23
7.	"Time"	6:09
8.	"Luna"	4:41
9.	"Stems"	1:33
10.	"Trains"	4:35

== Personnel ==
Musicians

- Poppy Ackroyd – primary artist, piano, producer
- Manu Delago – idiophone
- Mike Lesirge – clarinet
- Jo Quail – cello

Production

- Joe Acheson – mixer
- Mandy Parnell – mastering
