= Charles Games =

Czech video game developer

- Type: Private
- Industry: Video games
- Founded: 2020
- Headquarters: Prague, Czech Republic
- Key people: Lukáš Kolek
- Number of employees: 9
- Website: charlesgames.net

Charles Games is a Czech independent video game developing company founded in 2020 under Charles University. It aims to develop and sell computer games as well as serve as an incubator for computer game development students.

== History ==
Charles University started developing video games in 2010s. Employees and students from Faculty of Arts and Faculty of Mathematics and Physics made education game Československo 38–89: Atentát in 2015. In 2017 they developed largely expanded version Attentat 1942. Success of Attentat 1942 led to decision to establish new development studio.

Charles Games was founded in 2020. Otomar Sláma became first director. He stated that the profit from the sales of games will be invested back into the project, at least in the first years. He also expects Charles Games to increase the sales potential of games developed at Charles University. 6 people were employed at Charles Games at the time. First project released under Charles Games was Svoboda 1945: Liberation. It was followed by Train To Sachsenhausen which was developed in cooperation with in cooperation with the Living Memory organization. Charles Games next game was Beecarbonize which tackled topic of climate change. It received nomination for Apple Design Awards in category Social Impact. In May 2024 the studio released Playing Kafka.

== Released titles ==
| Year | Title | Platform(s) | | | | | Notes |
| Year | Title | iOS | Android | Win | OS X | Switch | Notes |
|---|---|---|---|---|---|---|---|
| 2021 | Svoboda 1945: Liberation | Yes | Yes | Yes | Yes | Yes | Sequel to Attentat 1942. |
| 2021 | DigiStories: Nela | No | No | Yes | No | No | Game about cyberbullying for the NGO People in Need. Used in schools. |
| 2022 | Train To Sachsenhausen | Yes | No | Yes | No | No | Game depicting the dramatic events associated with the closing of Czech universities on 17 November 1939. |
| 2023 | DigiStories: Alex | No | No | Yes | No | No | Game about digital addiction for the NGO People in Need. Used in schools. |
| 2023 | Beecarbonize | Yes | Yes | Yes | No | No | Card simulation game with ecological topic. Created again in collaboration with People in Need |
| 2024 | Playing Kafka | Yes | Yes | Yes | No | No | Adventure game aiming to introduce work of Franz Kafka to young generation. Created in collaboration with Goethe-Institut. |
| 2024 | Velvet 89 | Yes | Yes | Yes | No | No | Hidden object game about Velvet Revolution. |
| 2025 | Playing Prague | Yes | Yes | No | No | No | Puzzle game aiming to introduce Prague. |
| TBA | We Grew Up in War | No | No | Yes | No | No | Adventure game about children living in armed conflicts. |
| TBA | Silicomrades | No | No | Yes | No | No | |
