= Happy Game =

2021 video game

- Developer: Amanita Design
- Publisher: Amanita Design
- Designer: Jaromír Plachý
- Composer: DVA
- Engine: Unity
- Platforms: Microsoft Windows; macOS; Nintendo Switch; iOS; Android
- Release: October 28, 2021: Windows, macOS, Nintendo Switch October 28, 2021 iOS, Android February 2, 2023
- Genre: Graphic adventure game
- Mode: Single-player

Happy Game is a horror point-and-click adventure video game developed and published by Amanita Design. The game was first released on October 28, 2021 for Microsoft Windows and macOS via Steam and Nintendo Switch. It was then later released for iOS and Android on February 2, 2023.

== Gameplay ==
Happy Game is a point and click adventure game reminiscent of previous titles by Amanita Design but much darker. The Player has to get through three worlds while solving various puzzles on their way. The Player also comes across various creatures that can kill them and often has to perform actions quickly to not be killed.

== Plot ==
A young boy falls asleep to a horrible nightmare. He must go through three horrible nightmares to become happy once again. Throughout these nightmares, the player sees flashbacks from the boy's past.

== Development ==
Happy Game was mentioned as an upcoming project of Amanita Design in an interview by Lukáš Kunce in March 2018. Kunce stated it will be similar to Botanicula and Chuchel but darker. Happy Game was in development for 7 years. The game is designed by Jaromír Plachý, creator of Botanicula and Chuchel, while the soundtrack is composed by the band DVA. The game was officially announced on December 15, 2020 during a Nintendo Indie World presentation and it was scheduled to release in Fall 2021. A demo version of the game was released on February 3, 2021 during the Steam Game Festival.

== Reception ==
Reception

Aggregate scores
Aggregator	Score
Metacritic	(PC) 81/100
OpenCritic	74/100; 54% Critics Recommend

Review scores
Publication	Score
Adventure Gamers	3.5/5
Nintendo World Report	7.5/10
Shacknews	7/10

Happy Game received generally favorable reviews for PC, according to review aggregator Metacritic.

Review outlets praised the title's art style, score, sound design, and themes, and criticized the unengaging puzzles and clumsy controls.
