= Beecarbonize =

2023 video game

- Developer: Charles Games
- Engine: Unity
- Platforms: iOS; Android; Windows; macOS
- Release: March 2023
- Genre: Simulation
- Mode: Single-player

Beecarbonize is a 2023 free-to-play real time card-based simulation video game. It was developed by Prague-based studio Charles Games in association with People In Need, and being part of the 1PLANET4ALL project.

The game was released for iOS and Android in March 2023, and for Windows and macOS in August 2023.

The game was shortlisted for the 2023 awards of The Independent Game Developers' Association.

== Gameplay ==
In this game, the player is in charge of the sectors of industry, ecosystems, people, and science, and need to carefully manage emissions and avoid disasters in order to reach a sustainable future. The game is not turn-based: it runs on real time, but there are controls to pause or speed up. The objective of the game is to get a winning card, and this is done by upgrading the ones already "bought" using the tokens generated by the sectors.

The player is free to decide how to build each sector, with each card most often speeding up the token production speed of its sector. Some cards increase emissions, others reduce it, and others are neutral, and most cards are means of getting other more advanced cards. The size of the sectors can be upgraded to allow more cards to be placed on it.

Random disaster cards are generated and placed on the top row of the game board, and the player needs to mitigate the crisis before the card timer ends and the disaster happens. The disasters can have any effect, from increasing emissions, through loss of resources, up to losing the game entirely.

Out of the total 120 cards, there are 6 winning cards in the game:

1. "Industry 22nd Century"
2. "A Global Oasis"
3. "Eco Symbiosis"
4. "Planet B Colonized"
5. "No Tech Civilization"
6. "Planetary Thermostat"
