= Machinarium =

2009 video game

- Developer: Amanita Design
- Publishers: Amanita Design: WW: Lace International; WW: Daedalic Entertainment
- Designer: Jakub Dvorský
- Composer: Tomáš Dvořák
- Engine: Adobe Flash, DirectX
- Platforms: Windows; Windows Phone; OS X Linux; PlayStation 3 (PlayStation Network); PlayStation Vita iOS; BlackBerry PlayBook; Android; PlayStation 4 Nintendo Switch; Xbox One tvOS
- Release: October 16, 2009: Windows, OS X, Linux 16 October 2009 Definite Edition 23 June 2017 Collector's Edition; UK: 5 March 2010 PlayStation 3 (PSN); EU: 6 September 2012; NA: 9 October 2012; AS: 18 October 2012 PlayStation Vita; NA: 26 March 2013; EU: 1 May 2013; AS: 7 May 2013 iPad 2 8 September 2011 BlackBerry PlayBook 21 November 2011 Android 10 May 2012 PlayStation 4; JP: 1 September 2019; NA: 21 September 2016; PAL: 18 October 2016 Nintendo Switch 1 November 2018 Xbox One 16 April 2020
- Genres: Graphic adventure, Puzzle
- Mode: Single-player

Machinarium is a puzzle point-and-click adventure game developed by Amanita Design. It was released on 16 October 2009 for Microsoft Windows, OS X, Linux, on 8 September 2011 for iPad 2 on the App Store, on 21 November 2011 for BlackBerry PlayBook, on 10 May 2012 for Android, on 6 September 2012 on PlayStation 3's PlayStation Network in Europe, on 9 October 2012 in North America and on 18 October 2012 in Asia. It was also released for PlayStation Vita on 26 March 2013 in North America, on 1 May 2013 in Europe and on 7 May 2013 in Asia. Demos for Windows, Mac and Linux were made available on 30 September 2009. A future release for the Wii's WiiWare service was cancelled as of November 2011 due to WiiWare's 40MB limit.

Microsoft Windows, OS X, Linux and Android versions of this game were released along with Humble Indie Bundle for Android 4 on 8 November 2012, to customers who paid over the average price. The Windows Phone version was released on 22 March 2014. In 2017, the developer released a Definitive Version of the game that is based on a DirectX engine instead of Adobe Flash and can be played in full-screen mode. The Xbox One version of the game was released on 16 April 2020.

== Gameplay ==
A screenshot from Machinarium, demonstrating the hand-drawn backgrounds and the communication of objectives through pictorial thought bubbles

The goal of Machinarium is to solve a series of puzzles and brain teasers. The puzzles are linked together by an overworld consisting of a traditional "point and click" adventure story. The overworld's most radical departure is that only objects within the player character's reach can be clicked on.

Machinarium is notable in that it contains no dialogue, spoken or written, and apart from a few tutorial prompts on the first screen, is devoid of understandable language entirely. The game instead uses a system of animated thought bubbles. Easter egg backstory scenes in the same format can only be revealed by idling in certain areas.

The game employs a two-tier hint system. Once per level, the player can receive a hint, which becomes increasingly vague as the game progresses. Machinarium also comes with a walkthrough, that can be accessed at any time by playing a minigame. As with dialogue, the walkthrough is not in written or spoken form, but instead a series of sketches describing the puzzle at hand and its solution. However, the walkthrough only reveals what must be done in that area, and not how that puzzle relates to the game chronology.

== Plot ==
Machinarium opens with an overview of the eponymous city as a disposal flier launches from the pinnacle of its highest tower. The player character, a robot called Josef (named after Josef Čapek, the creator of the word "robot" and brother to Karel Čapek) is dumped on a scrapheap, where he re-assembles himself and sets off for the city. Entering the city, he discovers a plot by the Black Cap Brotherhood, the three criminal antagonists, to blow up the city's tower. He himself is then discovered and locked up.

After breaking out of prison, Josef aids the citizens of the city, as he discovers the mischief which the Brotherhood has been working. Shortly after flooding the Brotherhood's room (leaving them incapacitated), Josef locates his girlfriend Berta, who has been locked up and forced to cook. Unable to free her, he works his way to the top of the tower. After he foils the Black Cap Brotherhood's plot by disarming the bomb taped to the tower, Josef reaches the highest room, in which the story began.

A huge-headed robot, the "head" of the city, sits in the middle of the room, incapacitated and gibbering. Josef recalls how the three of them lived happily until the Black Cap Brotherhood zapped his friend, the huge-headed robot, leaving him disabled, and kidnapped Berta. When a garbage sucker arrived to dispose of the Black Cap thug, it apprehended Josef instead. After this revelation, Josef restores his friend to sanity, dumps the Brotherhood down a drain, and frees Berta. The two of them climb back to the tower, wave goodbye to their friend, and fly off into the sunset. In the final closing scene, their vehicle suffers a collision and falls, and they are seen being carried away separately by two fliers.

== Development ==
Machinarium was developed over a period of three years, by seven Czech developers, who financed the project with their own savings. The marketing budget for the game was $1,000.

The game was in development for the Xbox 360 platform for a period of six months; however, Microsoft, whom the developers had approached to publish the title on Xbox Live Arcade, ultimately decided not to do so. Microsoft does not allow games to be released on Xbox Live Arcade without a publisher attached to the title, and the developers were reluctant to approach a third party to publish the game, as this would mean that profits for the developers from sales over Xbox Live Arcade would be greatly reduced.

Subsequently, Amanita Design approached Sony, whose policies do allow for self-publishing on the PlayStation Network platform, and submitted the game for approval. In October 2012, Machinarium was released on the PlayStation 3, and included various new features; such as the ability to zoom in on the screen in-game and trophies. On 26 March, 2013, Machinarium was released on the PlayStation Vita, which featured touch screen controls and PSN leaderboards for players to compare their completion times and mini-game scores.

In 2011 it was mentioned that a sequel to Machinarium "is possible" but something the team has yet to fully consider. "We don't look far through the future", said Jakub Dvorský. On 8 October 2026 Machinarium 2 was announced during The Triple-i Initiative showcase.

== Reception ==
Reception

Aggregate scores
Aggregator	Score
GameRankings	(PC) 85%
Metacritic	(iOS) 88/100 (VITA) 88/100 (PC) 85/100 (PS3) 78/100

Review scores
Publication	Score
Edge	8/10
Eurogamer	8/10
Famitsu	32/40
GameSpot	8.0/10
IGN	(PS3) 8.0/10 (PC) 8.1/10
PC Gamer (UK)	73%
PC Gamer (US)	79%
TouchArcade	(iOS) 5/5

Awards
Publication	Award
IGF	Excellence in Visual Art (2009)
Kotaku	PC Game of the Year 2009 Runner-up
Aggie	Best Independent Adventure, Best Adventure of 2009 Runner-Up, Best Graphic Design, Best Music, Best Animation
Indiecade	Aesthetics (2008)

=== Critical response ===
Machinarium was well-received on release; on the critic aggregate sites GameRankings and Metacritic, the game has an average score of 85% and 85/100, respectively.

In 2008, it won the Aesthetics award at IndieCade (the International Festival of Independent Games). It won the Excellence in Visual Art award at the 12th Annual Independent Games Festival and the Best Soundtrack award from PC Gamer in 2009. During the 13th Annual Interactive Achievement Awards, Machinarium was nominated for "Outstanding Achievement in Art Direction" by the Academy of Interactive Arts & Sciences; it was also nominated for a Milthon award in the 'Best Indie Game' category at the Paris Game Festival.

Gaming site Kotaku named it a runner-up for "PC Game of the Year 2009" alongside Torchlight, losing to winner Empire: Total War. Gamasutra, Gamerview and the Turkish site of Tom's Hardware all selected Machinarium as the 'Best Indie Game' of 2009.

In 2011, Adventure Gamers named Machinarium the 17th-best adventure game ever released.

=== Pirate amnesty ===
On 5 August 2010, Amanita Design announced that according to their estimates, only 5–15% of Machinarium players had actually paid for the game. In an effort to increase sales, the game's price was lowered from the regular $20 to $5 until 12 August as an incentive for pirates to purchase the game legally. The campaign was later extended until 16 August, resulting in 20,000 game copies sold over the whole amnesty period.

=== Sales ===
Machinarium has sold over 4 million units as of 15 July 2016, 49% of which consists of PC sales, 44% mobile devices, and 7% consoles.

== Editions ==
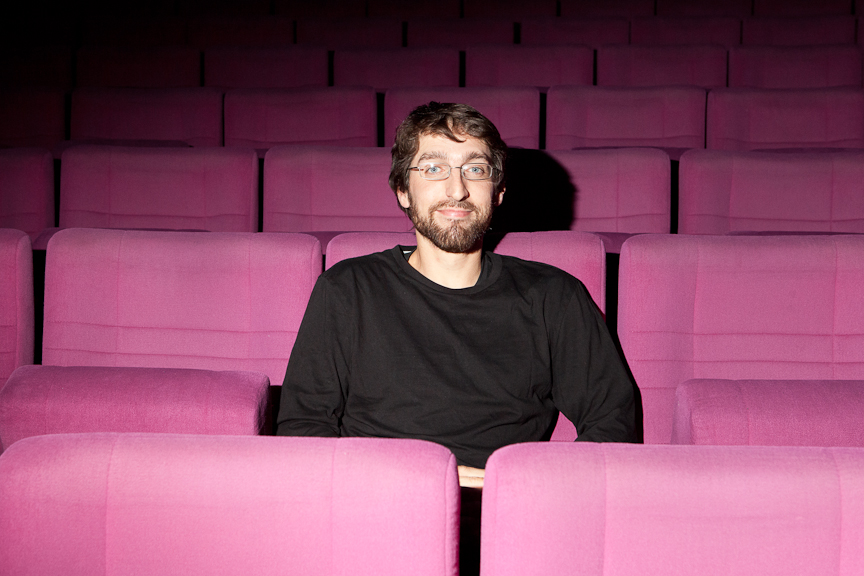
Jakub Dvorský, designer of Machinarium

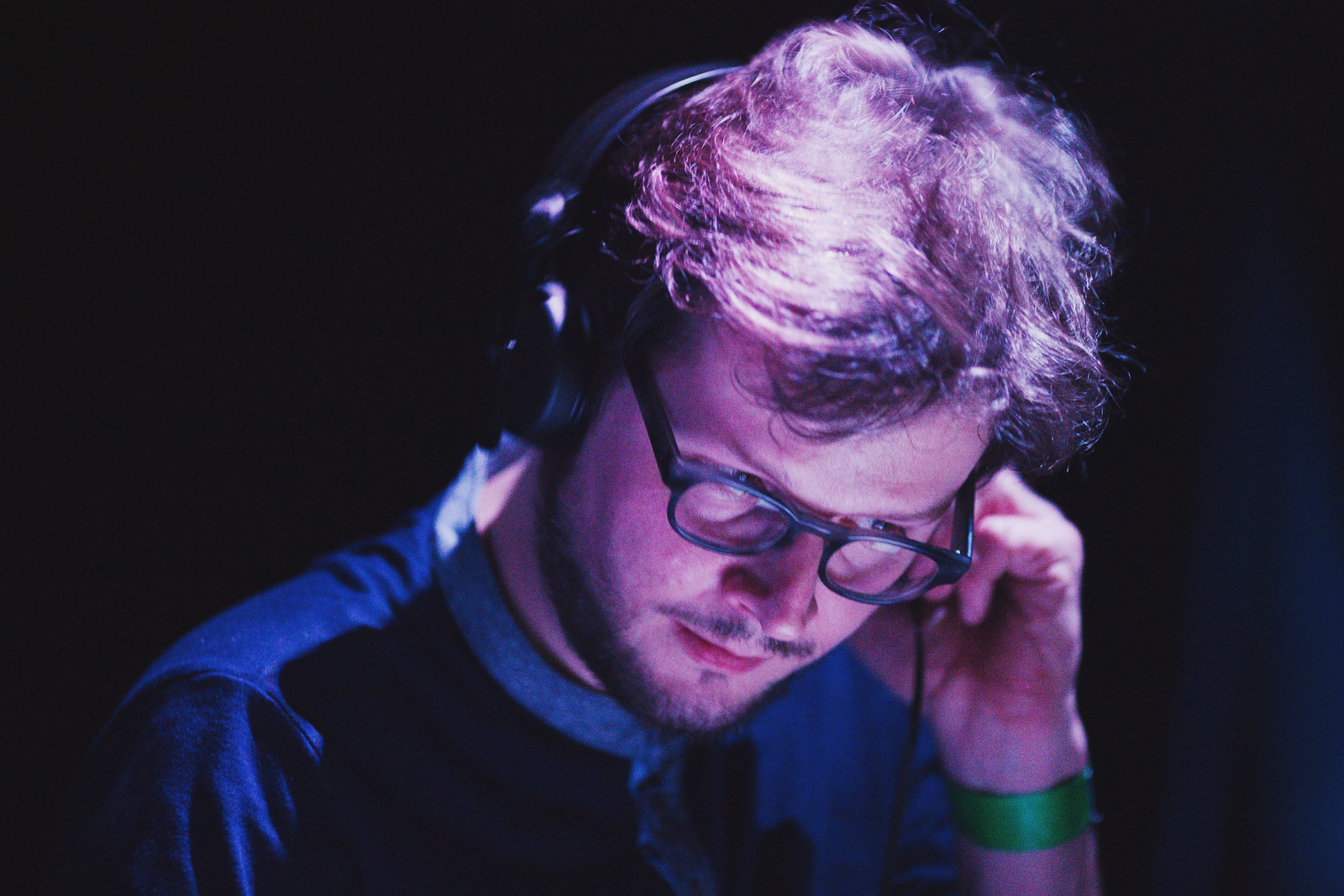
Tomáš Dvořák (Floex), composer of the soundtrack

Machinarium was released in several physical and digital formats.

- Physical:
1. Machinarium Collector's Edition (United Kingdom) – includes a DVD with the game, a soundtrack in digital format, a CD with the soundtrack, a printed walkthrough, an A3 poster and concept art. Systems: Windows, Mac (no Linux).
2. Mашинариум (Machinarium) (Russian Edition) – includes a DVD with the game and a CD with the soundtrack. Systems: Windows, Mac (no Linux).
3. Machinarium (German Edition) – includes a game disc, a CD with the soundtrack, Samorost 2 and a poster. Systems: Windows, Mac (no Linux).
4. Machinarium (French Edition) – includes a game disc, a CD with the soundtrack, Samorost 2 and a poster. Systems: Windows, Mac (no Linux).
5. Machinarium (Italian Edition) – includes a game disc. Systems: Windows (no Mac, no Linux).
6. Machinarium (Czech Edition) – includes a game disc and an MP3 soundtrack. Systems: Windows, Mac (no Linux).
7. Machinarium (Slovak Edition) – includes a game disc and an MP3 soundtrack. Systems: Windows, Mac (no Linux).
8. Machinarium (Polish Edition) – includes a DVD with the game, a soundtrack, an EP album in FLAC/MP3 digital formats and a poster. Systems: Windows, Mac. Packed in an "exclusive", metal box.
- Digital:
1. Amanita Design Store – includes Win, Mac and Linux versions of the game and a soundtrack in FLAC/MP3 format. It was released on 16 October 2009.
2. Steam – includes Win and Mac versions of the game. It was released on 16 October 2009.
3. GOG.com – "Machinarium: Collector's Edition" includes Win, Mac and Linux versions of the game, a soundtrack, and various artwork and supplemental materials.
4. Desura – includes Win, Mac and Linux versions of the game and a soundtrack. It was released on 19 December 2010 in conjunction with Humble Indie Bundle 2.
5. Impulse – includes a Win version of the game.
6. Direct2Drive – includes a Win version of the game.
7. GamersGate – includes Win and Mac versions of the game.
8. Mac App Store – includes a Mac version of the game. It was released on 18 March 2011.
9. Playism (Japan) – includes Win and Mac versions of the game. It was released on 11 May 2011.
- Consoles:
1. PlayStation 3 (PSN) (as Ultimate Version) – released on 6 September 2012 in Europe, 9 October 2012 in North America and 18 October 2012 in Asia.
- Cancelled:
1. Xbox 360 (XBLA) – the game was in development for the Xbox 360 platform for a period of six months; however, Microsoft, whom the developers had approached to publish the title on Xbox Live Arcade, ultimately decided not to do so.
2. Wii (WiiWare) – the game was being scheduled for a release for the Nintendo Wii's WiiWare service, but as of November 2011, it has been cancelled due to WiiWare's 40MB limit.
- Handheld game consoles:
1. PlayStation Vita – released on 26 March 2013 in North America, on 1 May 2013 in Europe and on 7 May 2013 in Asia.
- Tablets:
1. iPad 2 – released on 8 September 2011.
2. BlackBerry PlayBook – released on 21 November 2011.
3. Android – released on 10 May 2012.
4. iPad 1 – released as v2.0 on 16 October 2013.
- Natively runs on another platforms:
1. HP TouchPad – natively runs on the Flash-based PC version.

== Other media ==
Josef has been featured as a playable character in the platform game Super Meat Boy, and makes a cameo in the puzzle game ilomilo.

Josef was also included in the Video Game Character alphabet, created by Fabian Gonzalez.

Josef also made a cameo in Amanita Design's second full-scale game, Botanicula.

Machinarium and its soundtrack inspired the poem The Machingeon, written by Andrew Galan and published in Establishment Magazine Issue 1.

Josef is included in the "Good Friends" Character DLC pack for Runner2.

Josef is featured as an assist character in the fighting game Fraymakers.

In 2019, Tomáš Dvořák, the soundtrack composer for Machinarium better known under his pseudonym Floex, was performing live shows with a robotic version of Josef who plays various beat instruments. The performance itself consists of reworks of the soundtrack.

== Sequel ==
The sequel Machinarium 2 was announced on 8 October 2026, after almost 17 years from the release of the game. The game will feature similar elements of exploration and puzzles, same hand-drawn art style and storytelling, continuing the plot of the first Machinarium. The player will be able to switch between controlling Josef and Berta, and using their unique abilities to complete puzzles.

== See also ==
- Video games in the Czech Republic
- Art game
- Gobliiins
- The Humble Indie Bundle
