= Questionaut =

2008 video game

- Developer(s): Amanita Design
- Publisher(s): Amanita Design
- Designer(s): Jakub Dvorsky
- Programmer(s): David Oliva
- Artist(s): Václav Blín
- Composer(s): Tomáš Dvořák
- Engine: Adobe Flash
- Platform(s): Web browser
- Release: 2008
- Genre(s): Point-and-click adventure
- Mode(s): Single-player

Questionaut is a short educational video game developed by Amanita Design for the BBC. It's a point-and-click adventure game meant for English speaking children of school age. It is supposed to exercise their knowledge in English, mathematics and natural science.

== Gameplay ==
Players control an aeronaut who tries to get with his balloon as high as possible to get a hat which belongs to his friend Vodník. But the balloon loses its air and the aeronaut has to land on levitating planets. There are creatures on these planets who are specialized in some way (English language, mathematics, chemistry, etc.). The player has to solve a simple problem and then answer questions from the subject in which is the creature living on the planet specialized. Each of these questions have three possibilities. When the player chooses the right answer, the balloon gets some air but if he/she chooses wrong the balloon loses its air. When the player gets enough air, the balloon gets him to a higher planet.

== Development ==
Amanita Design developed Questionaut on BBC's commission. Amanita Design received questions that were to be included in the game and requested for it to be set in different environments, but the developers otherwise had creative freedom.
