= Phonopolis =

2026 video game

- Developer: Amanita Design
- Publisher: Amanita Design
- Platforms: Windows; macOS
- Release: 20 May 2026
- Genres: Puzzle, adventure
- Mode: Single-player

Phonopolis is a point and click adventure puzzle video game, developed by Czech company Amanita Design and released in May 2026.

== Plot ==
Felix, an inconspicuous young garbage collector, lives in Phonopolis, a city ruled by the dictatorial Leader. Though it isn't a direct depiction of any country, its visual design and political themes are inspired by the Soviet Union avant-garde constructivism in the late 1920s.

Felix unknowingly faces a great threat with his fellow citizens. Leader created a system of amplions through which he sends subliminal commands, and with them he leads the whole society to perfection. But behind what may have been a noble pursuit of a perfect community in its seed lies slavery, and after finding a pair of headphones, which are able to suppress the amplions' noise, Felix realizes that the pursuit of the Absolute Tone, to which the Leader has dedicated his life, may end in disaster. So he decides to thwart all Leader's plans and make sure that the society survives in its imperfection.

Felix begins his journey by meeting a group of three elders who oppose the Leader's regime. They reveal that Rachel, an opera singer whom they had hoped would help free the citizens from the Leader's control, is apparently performing the Absolute Tone. Felix eventually discovers that Rachel is being held captive by the Leader and forced to cooperate with him. After escaping imprisonment, Felix returns to the three composers, who help him find a way into the Avant-Garde Quarter, where the Leader's headquarters are located.

Felix infiltrates the Avant-Garde Quarter and reaches the Leader's tower, where he discovers Rachel imprisoned. The Leader is preparing to broadcast the Absolute Tone, forcing Rachel to produce the melodies required to complete it. Felix interferes with the machine and destroys it before the Absolute Tone can be completed. He then confronts the Leader, who grabs Felix and points a gun at him. Rachel intervenes by taking the microphone and singing a high note that causes the floor of the tower to collapse.

In the aftermath, the amplions throughout Phonopolis stop functioning and the citizens gradually regain consciousness. Felix removes his headphones, as the Leader's commands can no longer be heard through the amplions. The three elders then arrive and begin arguing about what Rachel should sing and how she should perform. Rachel eventually walks away from them. Felix leaves shortly afterwards.

Felix leaves Phonopolis alone, carrying his backpack. Rachel's bird joins him and perches on his shoulder. Felix remarks that Rachel may simply not have belonged in his world, although he can still hear her voice. The game ends with a view of Phonopolis, where a statue of the three elders has replaced the former statue of the Leader.

== Gameplay ==
Phonopolis is a point and click adventure puzzle game, mixing exploration with puzzles. The game's voice acting was released in English, with subtitles in other 15 languages. A month after the release, Czech voice acting was also supposed to be added.

== Development ==
Phonopolis was originally developed by Hammeware. The project caught interest of Jakub Dvorský from Amanita Design and in 2016 development moved under Amanita Design. The game was officially announced on 18 May 2022. The game differs from previous titles by Amanita Design with its graphics. While previous games used 2D graphics Phonopolis uses 3D graphics, made from real paper and then digitized. The game refers to interwar avant-garde artistic trends, such as constructivism, futurism or suprematism. A playable demo version consisting of a few beginning scenes was released on Steam on 11 February 2026. The full game was released on 20 May 2026.

== Reception ==
Reception

Aggregate scores
| Aggregator | Score |
|---|---|
| Metacritic | 84/100 |
| OpenCritic | 88% recommend |

Review score
| Publication | Score |
|---|---|
| Eurogamer | 80/100 |

Phonopolis received generally favorable reviews from critics, according to the review aggregation website Metacritic. Fellow review aggregator OpenCritic assessed that the game received strong approval, being recommended by 88% of critics.

Phonopolis received nominations for "Best Indie Game – Self-Published" and "Best Visual Design" at the Golden Joystick Awards 2026.
