= Hidden Orchestra =

Scottish musician

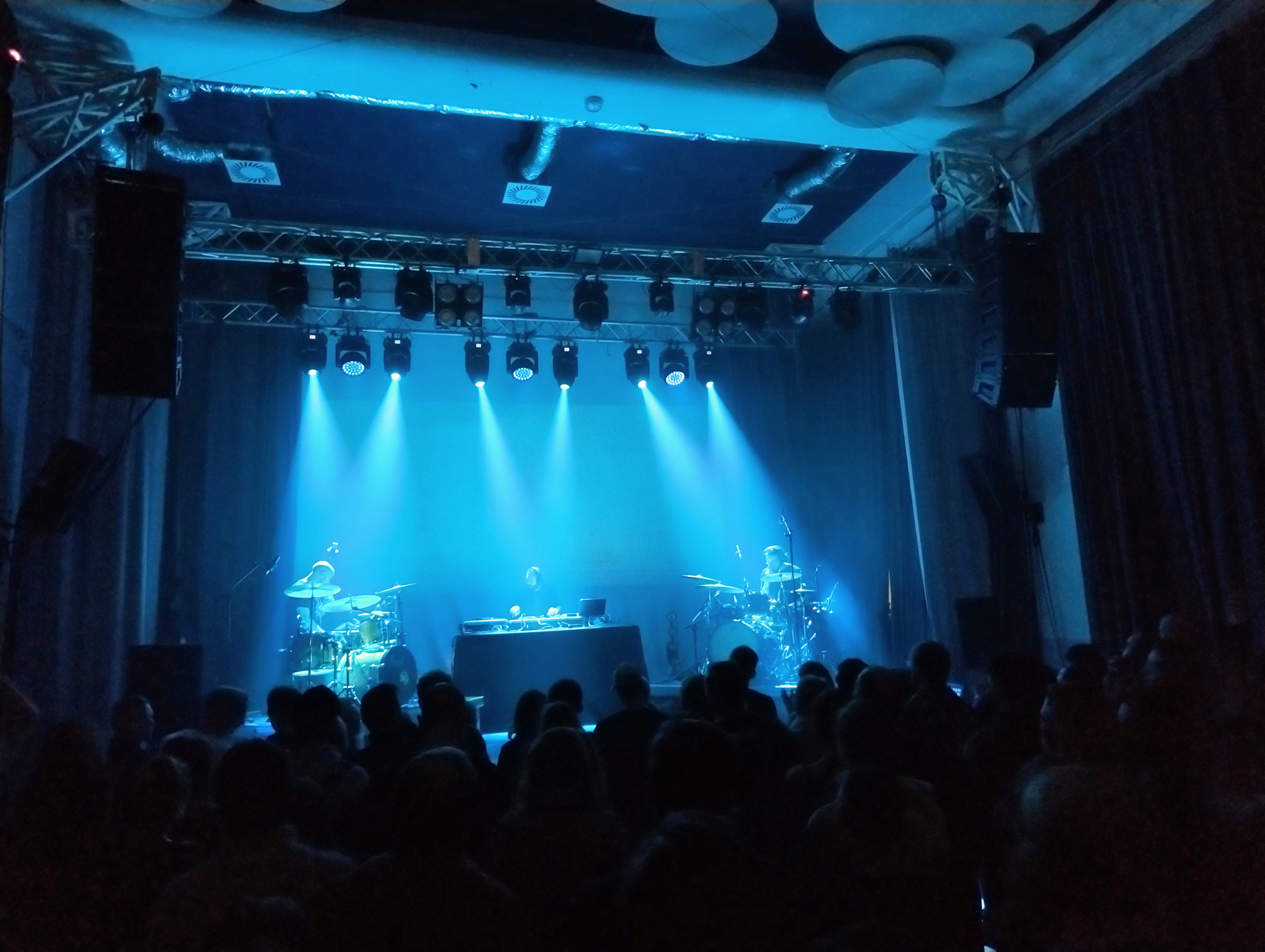
- Hidden Orchestra performing in 2024

Background information
- Origin: Edinburgh, Scotland
- Genres: Electronica, jazz, ambient
- Labels: Tru Thoughts, Denovali
- Website: hiddenorchestra.com

Hidden Orchestra is the solo studio project of multi-instrumentalist, composer, and producer Joe Acheson, whose albums and live shows include guest musicians from diverse musical backgrounds. Formed in Edinburgh, the band's regular live members include Poppy Ackroyd (violin/piano) and drummers Tim Lane and Jamie Graham.

Acheson records musicians individually, then combines the recordings in a studio as though the musicians were part of an orchestra. He uses field recordings, bass, drums, and percussion.

Hidden Orchestra's debut album Night Walks was released in September 2010 by Tru Thoughts. It mixed elements of jazz, classical music, drum and bass, rock and hip hop. Natural sounds are combined with electronic effects.

BBC Radio 1 chose Night Walks as Album of the Month. In January 2011 a vinyl deluxe version was published by Denovali.

The album Archipelago borrowed from Sufi music, modal jazz, progressive rock, and the sounds of birds and the wind. Popularity of the album resulted in two albums of remixes.

Hidden Orchestra composed the soundtrack for Creaks, a video game developed by Czech studio Amanita Design, which was released in July 2020.

== Discography ==
Studio albums

- Night Walks (2010)
- Archipelago (2012)
- Dawn Chorus (2017)
- To Dream Is to Forget (2023)

EP

- Flight (2011)

Remixes

- Archipelago Remixes (2013)
- Reorchestrations (Denovali, 2015)
- Wingbeats (2016)
- Dawn Chorus Remix Collection (2018)

Live

- Live at Attenborough Centre for the Creative Arts (2019)

Soundtracks

- Creaks (2020)
