= Samorost =

2003 video game

- Developer: Amanita Design
- Publisher: Amanita Design
- Designer: Jakub Dvorský
- Composers: Jakub Dvorský; Floex (Remaster)
- Series: Samorost
- Engine: Adobe Flash, Adobe Air (2021)
- Platforms: Browser, Microsoft Windows, MacOS, iOS, Android
- Release: 2003, 20 May 2021 (Remaster)
- Genres: Adventure, art game
- Mode: Single-player

Samorost is a puzzle point-and-click adventure game developed by Amanita Design. The first game of the Samorost series was released in 2003 for free on the Amanita Design website. Two sequels were released, Samorost 2 in 2005 and Samorost 3 in 2016. The game was remastered and released on 20 May 2021, for Windows and macOS for free. iOS and Android ports were also made.

== Gameplay ==
The player interacts with the world with a simple point and click interface directing a small, white-clad humanoid with a little cap and brown boots (called simply "gnome" by Dvorsky). The goal of the Samorost games is to solve a series of puzzles and brain teasers. The puzzles are sequentially linked forming an adventure story. The game contains no inventory or dialogue, and the solving of puzzles mainly consists of clicking on-screen elements in the correct order. Solving a puzzle will immediately transport the player character to the next screen.

The game features surrealistic, organic scenarios that mix natural and technological concepts (often featuring manipulated photographs of small objects made to look very large), creative character designs and a unique musical atmosphere. Music tracks are available through iTunes.

== Plot ==
The game starts as Gnome looks through telescope in his House. He suddenly spots a planet moving towards his home planet. He goes to his airship Polokonzerva and flies to the Planet. He lands on the planet and after some adventures he finds an engine room of the planet. He changes the planet's course so it narrowly misses Home Planet. Gnome then returns home as cheering is heard.

== Development ==
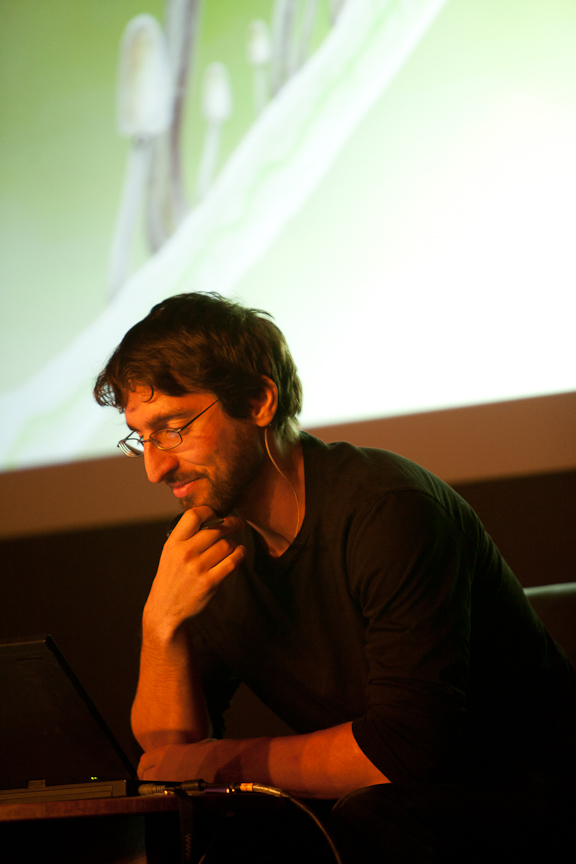
Jakub Dvorský, creator of Samorost

Samorost was created by Jakub Dvorský while he was a student at the Academy of Arts, Architecture and Design in Prague, in the department of Graphic Design and Visual Communication in 2003. Although short and simplistic in its gameplay, its surreal graphics and memorable score made the game stand out. The object of the game is to avert a collision between the gnome's home planet and a large incoming spaceship.

Samorost was nominated for the Webby Award in 2004 and the Top Talent Award in 2003.

=== Etymology ===
Samorost is a Czech word that is used to describe objects sculpted from discarded wood (roots, trunks, branches, etc.), usually for decorative purposes. The protagonist of the game lives on an asteroid that resembles such an object. Another meaning of 'samorost' is "maverick." The word is composed of the parts samo- ("self, auto-") and rost (form of růst, "to grow"). This could also be translated as "vagabond," "self-identifier," "individualist," or "wanderer," especially in the context of the protagonist.

=== Soundtrack ===
A soundtrack for the video game Samorost was "selected by Amanita Design's founder Jakub Dvorský from various sources". It wasn't officially released on any format; however, it was ripped from the game by a fan and uploaded to the internet.

Composer Floex provided music for the 2021 remaster.
