= Train To Sachsenhausen =

2022 video game

- Poster
- Developer: Charles Games
- Platforms: Windows, Android, iOS,
- Release: WW: 22 March 2022
- Genres: Adventure, educational

Train To Sachsenhausen is a 2022 educational video game by Charles Games. It was released for Windows, Android and iOS on 22 March 2022. Charles Games published it in cooperation with non-profit company Živá paměť.

== Gameplay ==
In terms of genre, the game belongs to adventure games. It deals with the events connected with the closing of Czech universities on 17 November 1939, the subsequent student protests and the subsequent executions of Czech students and their imprisonment in the Sachsenhausen concentration camp. The player assumes the role of a student participating in the mentioned events. Emphasis is placed on the evaluation of each player's decision, as well as the influence on the next plot, from which the end of the game depends. The game offers several endings.
