= Svoboda 1945: Liberation =

2021 video game

- Poster
- Developer: Charles Games
- Platforms: Macintosh, Windows, Linux, Android, iOS
- Release: WW: August 3, 2021
- Genres: Adventure, Educational

Svoboda 1945: Liberation is a 2021 Czech point-and-click adventure game. It is the sequel to Attentat 1942 (2017) and was the first game developed by Charles Games, a subsidiary of Charles University. The game tells the story of the end of World War II and the subsequent displacement of the German population from the perspective of people who experienced the events. The game is based on film interviews, interactive comics and authentic footage. The characters in the game and their stories are fictional, but they were created based on historical research and contemporary testimonies.

== Gameplay ==
Svoboda 1945 is a point-and-click adventure game in which the player finds himself in the role of a preservationist who was sent to the village Svoboda to evaluate the historical value of the old school. A local businessman seeks to demolish the school and bought the land on which the school is located. However, a memorialist finds a photo of his grandfather in the attic and begins to search for the history of the place while trying to fight the entrepreneurial Mammon. The gameplay is largely unchanged from Attentat 1942, with the player asking questions to witnesses of past events in order to slowly unravel the story.

== Reception ==
At the 2021 Czech Game of the Year Awards, Svoboda 1945: Liberation won the Czech game of the year award.
