= Drábské světničky =

Ruined rock castle in the Czech Republic

Coordinates: 50°31′54″N 15°01′54″E

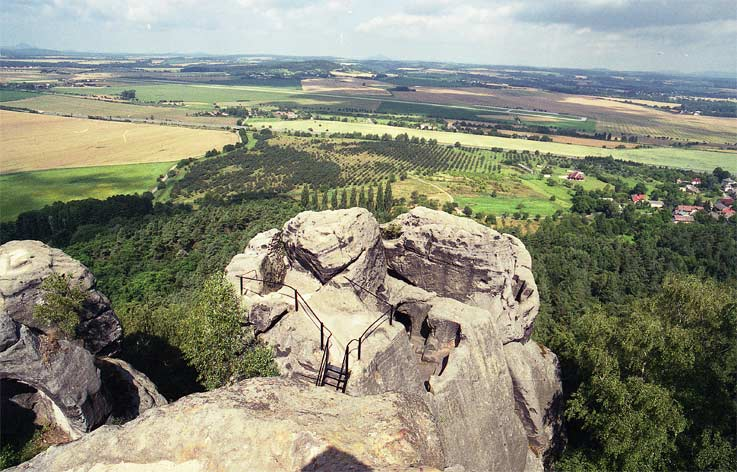
A view of the castle

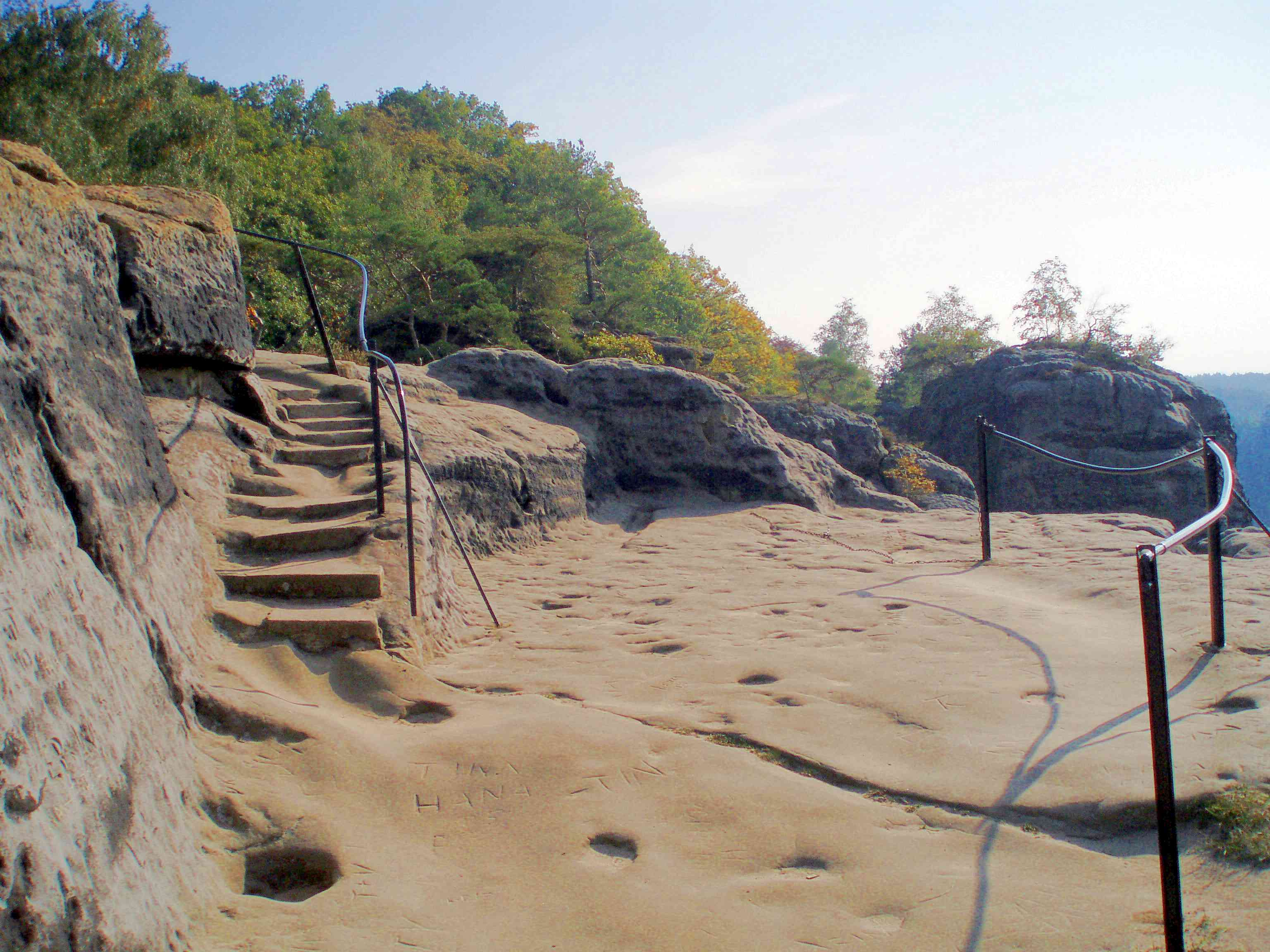
Drábské světničky

Drábské světničky is a ruin of a 13th-century rock castle in the Czech Republic. It is located about 4 kilometres (2.5 mi) northeast of Mnichovo Hradiště on the ragged edge of a sandstone cliff high above surrounding landscape. The castle covers a group of seven sandstone rocks, connected with wooden bridges. It has been abandoned since the Hussite wars in the 15th century.

The site is a popular visitor attraction and heavy footfall has caused erosion of the rock. Vandals have also carved graffiti into the stone. The Czech government's forestry department carried out improvement works from around 2021 at a cost of 18 million crowns. The site reopened in November 2026 with new footbridges, walkways and railing. Repairs were also made to the damaged stone and slopes stabilised.
