= DVA (band) =

Czech musical duo

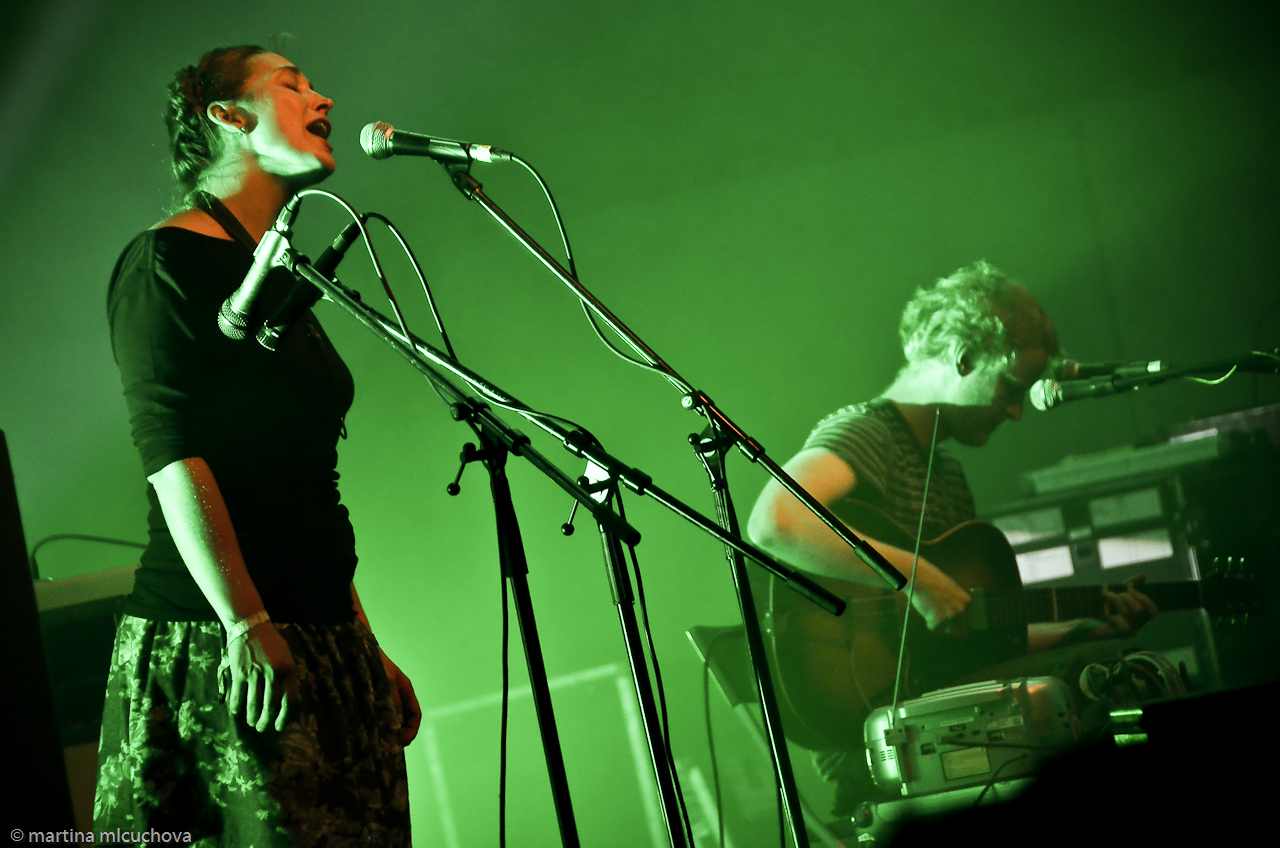
- DVA performing in 2011

Background information
- Origin: Hradec Králové, Czech Republic
- Genres: Alternative rock, freak folk
- Years active: 2006–present
- Labels: Label Home Table, Indies
- Members: Bára Ungerová; Jan Kratochvíl
- Website: 2dva.cz

DVA is a Czech alternative rock music duo consisting of Bára Ungerová and Jan Kratochvíl. DVA have described their style as "folk music of nonexistent nations", which consists of a mix of tango, cabaret, circus, pop, beatboxing, freak folk, and acoustic electro, among a variety of other eclectic styles. The lyrics of their songs are made up of nonsensical words that mix German, Hungarian, and Swedish, among others.

== History ==
DVA (which means "two" in Czech) was formed in 2006 by Bára Ungerová (then Bára Kratochvílová) and Jan Kratochvíl, who were both previously associated with Divadlo DNO in Hradec Králové. They simultaneously launched their own home-based record label, Label Home Table. Their debut album, titled Fonók, was released in 2008. They followed it a year later with Kollektt8, a collection of unreleased tracks, which they gave away for free. The duo has since released three further studio albums: HU (2010), Nipomo (2014), and Piri Piri (2024). Dva's stage performances are often accompanied by projections created by Markéta Lisá and Magdalena Hrubá (under the name 2M) from the electro group Midi lidi.

=== Video game soundtracks ===
In 2012, DVA composed the soundtrack for the Amanita Design video game Botanicula. The record received an Independent Game Festival Award for Excellence in Audio. In 2018, the duo wrote the soundtrack for another video game by Jaromír Plachý, this one titled Chuchel. They named the album Cherries on Air. The soundtrack was released as their sixth album. In 2021, Dva published the soundtrack for another Amanita Design project, also designed by Jaromír Plachý, titled Happy Game.

== Band members ==
- Bára Ungerová – vocals, wind instruments
- Jan Kratochvíl – guitar, banjo, looping, beatboxing, vocals

Touring members

- 2M (Magdalena Hrubá and Markéta Lisá) – projections

== Discography ==
Studio albums

- Fonók (2008)
- Kollektt8 (2009)
- HU (2010)
- Nipomo (2014)
- Piri Piri (2024)

Soundtracks

- Lappop (Soundtrack to the play Ledové techno, tedy lapohádky – 2007)
- Mélies (Soundtrack to Georges Méliès films – 2008)
- Caligari (Original music for reinterpretation of The Cabinet of Dr. Caligari – 2008)
- Vše pro dobro světa a Nošovic (Documentary soundtrack – 2010)
- Medvědí ostrovy (Documentary soundtrack – 2010)
- Botanicula – (Video game soundtrack – 2012)
- Cherries on Air – (Chuchel soundtrack – 2018)
- Happy Game – (Video game soundtrack – 2021)

Other albums

- Bezděčné vítězství (Radio play broadcast – 2006)
- Nunovó Tango (Mini-album – 2006)
- Elektro a kusto (Mini-album – 2006)
- Kapitán Demo (Compilation of Nunovó Tango, Elektro a kusto, Lappop, Caligari, Zvonění do mobilních telefonů, et al. – 2007)
- Zvonění do mobilních telefonů (2008)

== Selected awards ==
- Nominated at the 2008 Anděl Awards for Best Alternative Music Album, Fonók
- 2010 Anděl Award, Best Alternative Music Album for HU
