= Asmodeus: Tajemný kraj Ruthaniolu =

1997 video game

Asmodeus
- Czech box art
- Developer: NoSense
- Publisher: Vochozka Trading
- Designer: Jakub Dvorský
- Programmer: Marek Floryán
- Artist: Jakub Dvorský
- Writers: Jakub Dvorský; Marek Floryán
- Composer: Jan Sklenář
- Platform: MS-DOS
- Release: 1997
- Genres: Action-adventure, role-playing
- Mode: Single-player

Asmodeus: Tajemný kraj Ruthaniolu (English: Asmodeus: Mysterious Country of Ruthaniol) is a video game developed by Czech company NoSense for MS-DOS and published by Vochozka Trading (now 2K Czech) in 1997. It is a mix of action-adventure and role-playing played from a first-person perspective.

== Plot ==
The game follows Mot. He is an apprentice of a Monk who decides to summon an ancient God Asmodeus to "save the world." Monk sends Mot to find three Eterons, magic stones needed to summon Asmodeus.

Mot searches for Eterons through the Ruthaniol country. He completes the task but finds out that Asmodeus is not a god that will save the world but a devil. Mot still takes Eterons to the Monk but tries to convince him to not summon Asmodeus. Monk reveals that he actually wants to use Asmodeus to rule the world. Mot stands up to his master but is quickly killed and Monk summons Asmodeus. The game ends as Asmodeus kills the Monk and leaves the cave.

== Gameplay ==
Asmodeus features a First person view. Movement is similar to Myst. The game is played as a dungeon crawler RPG, while in tunnels that are full of enemies. The player can kill these enemies with his weapon. He can improve his weapon and skills throughout the game so he can fight harder enemies. On the other hand, when the player is outside of tunnels, it becomes an adventure game. The player talks to NPCs, takes objects and uses them on the right place.

== Development ==
The game was in development since 1994. The team consisted of only 2 people - Jakub Dvorský and Marek Floryán. Developers drew inspiration form games like Myst, Elvira: Mistress of the Dark and Stonekeep. Asmodeus also changed its genre a few times during development. The game was originally a text adventure game but changed into a point-and-click adventure. Action parts were added later and the game become a dungeon crawl RPG mixed with adventure game elements. The team has grown as Dvorský and Floryán were later aided by three other members. The game was finished in 1996 and the developers contacted Petr Vochozka, a CEO of Vochozka Trading. Vochozka Trading released Asmodeus in 1997.

== Reception ==
The game has received generally positive reviews.

SCORE's Karel Taufman gave the game 80%. He praised the gameplay, story and technical performance. He also praised voice casting and its sound quality. On the other hand, he criticised some voice actors obviously playing more characters. He also gave much praise to the graphics and animations. He concluded the review: "Correctly mixed Adventure and Dungeon. The best Czech video game so far."

Review in the Pařeniště magazine gave 70%. The review praised the story and atmosphere. Another praised aspect of the game were graphics that could compete with "some foreign titles." The game was criticised for its corridor-like world that lacks much free space and also criticised the lack of automapping.

LeveL's Martin Kalivoda gave 4 points of 7 indicating a "decent" rating.

Riki's Vladan Hamřík gave 75%. He praised the voice actors, graphics and writing but criticised interiors. He concluded the review: "Asmodeus is not a bad game but is far from perfection".
