= Samorost 3 =

2016 video game

- Developer: Amanita Design
- Publisher: Amanita Design
- Composer: Floex
- Series: Samorost
- Platforms: Microsoft Windows, OS X, iOS, Android
- Release: 24 March 2016 (Windows, Mac); 3 December 2016 (Android)
- Genres: Adventure, puzzle
- Mode: Single-player

Samorost 3 is a puzzle point-and-click adventure game developed by Amanita Design. It is the third video game title in the Samorost series and the sequel to Samorost 2. It is the first game in the series that is full-length and with high-definition graphics. The story takes place across five planets and four moons. The game was originally scheduled for 2015.

Samorost 3 has sold over 300,000 units as of February 2017.

== Development ==
The development started in 2010. Samorost 3 was developed by a team of about six people. Developers drew artistic inspiration from animated films by Czech directors like Karel Zeman, Jan Švankmajer, Jiří Barta or Břetislav Pojar. Another source of inspiration were films by Russian animator Yuriy Norshteyn. The game consists of 45 screens that were changed many times during development. Another important part of development was sound recording. It was created by people making weird noises in microphones. These people include Bára Kratochvílová and Miloš Dvořáček. Other sounds were created by Tomáš Dvořák as he used multiple instruments, such as a lollipop used to a strum, to create required sounds. Dvořák also composed the music for the game.

Samorost 3 was released on 24 March 2016 for Steam, and 3 December 2016 for Android.

== Gameplay ==
Samorost 3 features gameplay similar to previous Amanita Design games. The game contains no comprehensible dialogue, only a system of animated thought bubbles and gibberish. The player controls Gnome on his journey through space full of planets, equipped with an inventory and a flute. He explores the environment, solves puzzles and collects items required for the obstacles that come in his way. He can also communicate with creatures he meets during his journey. The player can also use a flute that is required to solve some puzzles.

Samorost 3 features a walkthrough that can be accessed at any time by playing a minigame if the player gets stuck. The walkthrough is not in written or spoken form, but instead a series of sketches describing the puzzle at hand and its solution.

== Plot ==
Samorost 3 starts when a magical flute falls near the Gnome's house. The Gnome decides to find out where it came from and sets out on a journey through the cosmos. He speaks to an engineer and asks him to build a toadstool rocket, which he builds by reusing parts found scattered on his home planet. The Gnome flies from planet to planet and meets multiple creatures whom he helps with their problems using the flute.

The Gnome eventually discovers two illustrated books and learns that the flute belongs to four monks. Not long ago, the monks were all at peace, until a giant orange space octopus arrived from a black wormhole and started consuming planets. The monks saw the octopus coming and consulted an engineer (the same one from the Gnome's home planet) to build a three-headed watering spaceship controlled by the flutes on the back of which they can fly, and a mechanical knight powered by a black orb with which to fight the octopus and save the universe. The knight dismembers and kills the octopus, then the knight goes to sleep on a moon, and the orb is locked away and protected by a guardian monk.

In the second book, one of the four monks uses his flute to create evil spirits, and the other three monks banish him for doing so. He secretly takes the spaceship and converts it into a three-headed fire-breathing mechanical dragon. Flying on the dragon, he snatches the other three flutes from the monks and casts the monks out of their mountain castle. However one of the flutes flew away, and this is the flute that landed on the Gnome's planet. He then uses the dragon to consume good spirits which he finds on other planets and then seizes the black orb so that the knight cannot be awakened to stop him.

The Gnome eventually reaches the planet of monks, sneakily steals the black orb from the evil monk, and uses it to revive the mechanical knight who then slays the dragon. The Gnome celebrates by playing music with the remaining three monks, who reward him with the power to travel instantly across all the planets and returns the black orb to its guarded storage. The Gnome finally returns to his home planet to greet his dog.

== Reception ==
Reception

Aggregate scores
Aggregator	Score
Metacritic	PC: 80/100
OpenCritic	78/100; 69% Critics Recommend

Review scores
Publication	Score
Adventure Gamers	4.5/5
Destructoid	8/10
GameSpot	7/10
Hardcore Gamer	4/5
PC Gamer (US)	87/100
Pocket Gamer	4.5/5

Samorost 3 has generally been well received by critics. It currently holds 80/100 on Metacritic.

The Washington Post called Samorost 3 "a strange and beautiful point-and-click adventure game." The review likened Samorost 3 to Loom as both games "feature a hooded main character (gnome) who channels magic out of music." The review praised the animation and surrealistic visuals. Another point of praise was a hint system that can spare players of frustration. The review finished with a recommendation for parents who "look for something to play with their young children." PC Gamer reviewed the game positively and praised its surrealness, writing, "Samorost 3 is brilliant at times: Weird, wonderful, and a worthy next step in the evolution of Amanita Design." Destructoid highly recommended the game, stating, "[Samorost 3] is jam-packed with delightful characters, stunning scenery, and clever puzzles, so while it may be brief, it's certainly time well spent." GameSpot praised the title's distinctive visual style, world, and soundtrack while criticizing its bland puzzles.

Kill Screen called Samorost 3 "The best adventure game in years". The review praised the design of the game world and its visuals. The game was also praised for its explorative gameplay that gives players a feeling of exploration.

Kotaku included Samorost 3 in its list of titles with the best video game music of 2016.

Samorost 3 was nominated for the 13th annual Global International Mobile Gaming Awards in 2017.

Samorost 3 is nominated for 6 Czech Game of the Year Awards. It was nominated in categories Best Game, Best PC/Console Game, Best Audio, Best Game Design, Best Story and Best Visuals. The winners were announced on 10 February 2016. Samorost 3 has won in 3 categories - Czech game of the year, Czech game of the year for PC/Consoles and Best audio. Samorost 3 was the most successful game at the Czech Game of the Year Awards show of 2016.
