= Samorost 2 =

2005 video game

- Developer: Amanita Design
- Publisher: Amanita Design
- Designers: Jakub Dvorský; Václav Blín
- Composer: Floex
- Series: Samorost
- Engine: Adobe Flash
- Platforms: Linux, Mac OS X, Windows, Android, iOS
- Release: Linux, Mac OS X, Windows; 8 December 2005; Android, iOS; 5 November 2020
- Genre: Graphic adventure
- Mode: Single-player

Samorost 2 is a puzzle point-and-click adventure game developed by Amanita Design. Released for Windows, OS X and Linux on 8 December 2005, the game is the second video game title in the Samorost series and the sequel to Samorost. On 5 November 2020, the game received an update with enhanced visuals, brought fullscreen support & replaced level codes with a level select system. This version also received iOS & Android ports.

== Plot ==
The game starts when aliens land at Gnome's house and steal his pears. They are interrupted by Gnome's dog, so the aliens kidnap him. Gnome spots the aliens leaving with his dog, and chases them with his Polokonzerva rocket ship. He lands on the alien's planet and manages to infiltrate the alien's underground base. He finds his dog, who is held by the aliens' leader to help power his cooling fan. Gnome saves the dog and together they escape the planet, but their rocket ship runs out of fuel and crashes on another planet. They travel around the planet and eventually find an air taxi driver and convince him to take them home. The driver then celebrates with Gnome and his dog at a bonfire, before departing. The dog curls up in front of his dog house while Gnome relaxes under his fruit trees, falling asleep.

== Gameplay ==
Gameplay is similar to the previous game. The player interacts with the world with a simple point and click interface directing a small, white-clad humanoid with a little cap and brown boots (called simply "gnome" by Dvorsky). The goal of the Samorost games is to solve a series of puzzles and brain teasers. The puzzles are sequentially linked forming an adventure story. The game contains no inventory or dialogue, and the solving of puzzles mainly consists of clicking on-screen elements in the correct order. Solving a puzzle will immediately transport the player character to the next screen.

The game features surrealistic, organic scenarios that mix natural and technological concepts (often featuring manipulated photographs of small objects made to look very large), creative character designs and a unique musical atmosphere.

== Development ==
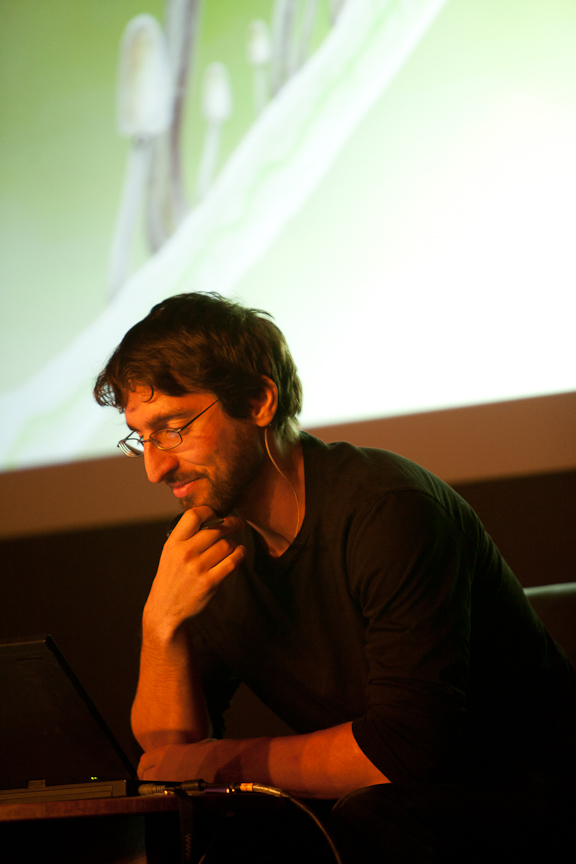
Jakub Dvorský, creator of Samorost

Together with his freelance Flash and web design agency, Amanita Design, Dvorský produced a sequel, Samorost 2. In Samorost 2, the gnome goes on a longer quest to save his kidnapped dog and return safely home. The first chapter of this game (comprising the first 4 levels) can be played online for free. The second chapter (with 3 levels) is only playable in the full version, which cost $6.90 until the price was later lowered to $5.00.

=== Soundtrack ===
Samorost 2 Soundtrack

Soundtrack album by Tomáš Dvořák
- Released: 8 December 2005
- Genre: Video game soundtrack
- Length: 40:09
- Label: Quazi Delict Records
- Producer: Tomáš Dvořák

The Samorost 2 Soundtrack is composed, written, arranged and produced by Tomáš Dvořák for Amanita Design, the soundtrack was released on 8 December 2005 in digital format and on 5 June 2006 on cd. The album includes 12 tracks.

No.	Title	Length
1.	"Šnekoun"	5:14
2.	"Samorost Intro"	2:39
3.	"Samorost Outro I"	1:04
4.	"Sopouch"	2:20
5.	"Podzemí"	3:54
6.	"Kapky"	2:20
7.	"Budoar"	3:35
8.	"Planina"	3:24
9.	"Jezevec"	2:45
10.	"Lesik"	5:15
11.	"Tuleni"	6:04
12.	"Samorost Outro II"	1:34

- Tomáš Dvořák - composer, writer, arranger and producer;
- Jakub Dvorský, Tomáš Dvořák - cover design;
- Jakub Dvorský - artwork.

It was recorded, mixed and mastered by Tomáš Dvořák at Mush Room Prague / Budapest. It is packaged in digipak. The CD includes the PC and Mac version of Samorost 2 by Amanita Design. The Samorost 2 Soundtrack won the Original Sound category at the Flashforward Film Festival 2006.

== Release ==
Samorost 2 was released in several physical and digital formats.

- Physical:
1. International release - includes a CD with the Win and Mac versions of the game and the soundtrack (CD-DA and mp3 files). It is packaged in a digipak. It was released on 5 June 2006.
2. Collector's Edition (Russian) - includes a CD with a Russian version of the game, a CD with the soundtrack and artbook with some sketches, informations, etc. It is packaged in a DVD-box. It was released on 21 November 2008.
- Digital:
1. Amanita Design Store - includes Win, Mac and Linux versions of the game and soundtrack in mp3 format. It was released on 8 December 2005.
2. Steam - includes the Win version. It was released on 11 December 2009.
3. App Store (macOS) - includes the Mac version. It was released on 28 April 2011.

Samorost 2 has been featured in the Humble Indie Bundle which took place from 4 May 2010 – 11 May 2010 which was subsequently extended to the 15th and raised $1,273,613. Of this, contributors chose to allocate 30.90% to the charity: $392,953 for the Electronic Frontier Foundation and Child's Play Charity.

== Reception ==
Reception

Review score
Publication	Score
Adventure Gamers	4.5/5

Critical reviews were generally positive. The game was praised for its visuals and simple gameplay.

=== Awards ===
Samorost 2 has won several awards. These include a 2007 Webby in the games category; Independent Games Festival award in 2007 for Best Web Browser Game; Best Web-Work Award at the Seoul Net Festival in 2006. The soundtrack won the Original Sound category at the Flashforward Film Festival 2006. The game was also nominated in 3 categories (Best Game, Best New Character and Best Visual Effects) in the GameShadow Innovation in Games Awards.

In 2011, Adventure Gamers named Samorost 2 the 54th-best adventure game ever released.

== Sequel ==
The sequel Samorost 3 has been released in 2016 on multiple platforms (PC / Android /IOS).
