= Amanita Design =

Czech independent video game developer

Amanita Design s.r.o.
- Type: Private
- Industry: Video games
- Founded: 2003
- Founder: Jakub Dvorský
- Headquarters: Prague, Czech Republic
- Products: List
- Revenue: 83,809,000 Czech koruna (2021)
- Operating income: 31,130,000 Czech koruna (2021)
- Net income: 25,234,000 Czech koruna (2021)
- Total assets: 140,226,000 Czech koruna (2021)
- Number of employees: 30 (2024)
- Website: amanita-design.net

Amanita Design s.r.o. is a Czech independent video game developing company founded in 2003 by Jakub Dvorský and headquartered in Prague, Czech Republic. The company has created award-winning games including Machinarium, the Samorost series and Botanicula, as well as educational and advertising minigames and animations, all using Adobe Flash. Clients include BBC, Nike and The Polyphonic Spree. Since Pilgrims (2019) and Creaks (2020), the company has been using Unity to develop its games. Amanita Design currently operates in several smaller teams, each developing a game of their own. One of them is the cardboard-built adventure Phonopolis. The company's name and logo are derived from the Amanita muscaria, a poisonous and psychoactive mushroom known for producing hallucinations. The fact that it's known for containing a psychedelic compound pays homage to the surreal and dreamlike style the video games are known for.

== History ==
Amanita Design was founded in 2003. Samorost 2 won the Webby Award. In 2009, Amanita Design released the award-winning game Machinarium. Botanicula was released in April 2012 as both a standalone purchase as well as the subject of the Humble Botanicula Debut. On 24 March 2016, it released Samorost 3 (the follow-up to Samorost 2). The studio's eleventh project was Chuchel, which was released on 7 March 2018. In October 2019, the studio launched a non-linear adventure game Pilgrims on PC and Apple Arcade. In July 2020, Apple Arcade debuted Amanita's immersive puzzler Creaks, which was also released on PC, PlayStation 4, Xbox One and Nintendo Switch a week later. Amanita Design's latest release is the psychedelic horror Happy Game designed by Jaromír Plachý (Botanicula, CHUCHEL) and released in October 2021 on PC and Nintendo Switch. In February 2023, Happy Game arrived onto Google Play and iOS App Store.

On 18 May 2022, it announced a development of its first 3D adventure game – Phonopolis, featuring hand-crafted assets and traditional 12 FPS stop-motion animation. Phonopolis made its playable debut at Day of the Devs (San Francisco Edition) in March 2024, and in the same week, received the IGF Excellence in Visual Art award at GDC – Amanita Design's 5th Independent Games Festival award.

On 26 March 2025, the studio announced that from 26 March to 2 April, 100% of the proceeds from the sale of games and DLC will be used to help Ukraine.

== Games ==
Title	Year	Platform(s)	Description
Samorost	2003	Browser, Windows, MacOS, Android, iOS	Point and click adventure game
Rocketman	2004	Browser	Short game for Nike
The Quest for the Rest	2004	Browser	Short game based on the pop band Polyphonic Spree
Samorost 2	2005	Browser, Android, Windows, iOS, MacOS	Second game in the Samorost series
Questionaut	2008	Browser	Short educational game
Plachý Trpaslík	2009	Browser	Short platformer game
Machinarium	2009	Windows, iOS, PS3, PS Vita, PS4, Android, Nintendo Switch, Xbox One	First full-length game
Botanicula	2012	Windows, MacOS, iOS, Linux, Android	Second full-length game
Samorost 3	2016	Windows, MacOS, iOS, Android	Third game in the Samorost series
Chuchel	2018	Windows, MacOS, iOS, Android	Comedy adventure game by Jaromír Plachý
Pilgrims	2019	iOS, Windows, MacOS, Linux, Nintendo Switch	Non-linear adventure game
Creaks	2020	Windows, MacOS, iOS, PS4, Xbox One, Nintendo Switch	Mystery puzzle game
Happy Game	2021	Windows, MacOS, Nintendo Switch, iOS, Android	Psychedelic horror adventure
Phonopolis	2026	Windows, MacOS	A hand-crafted adventure game
Machinarium 2	TBA	Windows, MacOS	Second game in the Machinarium series

== Side projects ==
- Little Buddy Move – music video (programming) for Hidden Orchestra (2023)
- Vespering – music video for DVA by Jaromír Plachý (2016)
- Mulatu – music video for DVA by Jaromír Plachý (2013)
- Zorya – music album by Floex (2011)
- Kooky – puppet feature film and book by Jakub Dvorský (2010)
- Nunovó Tango – music video for DVA by Jaromír Plachý (2009)
- Plantage – music video for Under Byen by Jakub Dvorský (2004)
- Na tu svatbu – music video for Kamil Jasmín by Václav Blín (2002)
- Nusle – short film (2001)
- Psyride – psytrance music video (2001)
- Blanka Šperková – flash website by Jakub Dvorský
- Podvědomím – flash website by Jakub Dvorský
- Pantry – web toy by Jakub Dvorský

== Team members and collaborators ==
Amanita Design was founded by game designer, artist and animator Jakub Dvorský in 2003. The studio has worked with artists, animators, programmers and musicians on its games, including animator Václav Blín, artist Adolf Lachman, musician Tomáš Dvořák (Floex), and game designer and animator Jaromír Plachý.

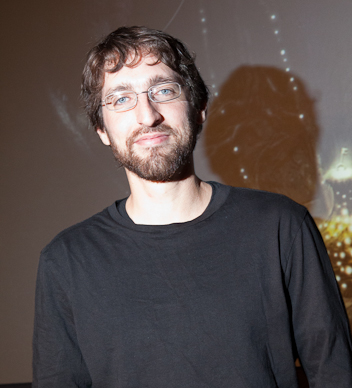
Jakub Dvorský, studio founder

- Jakub Dvorský (game designer, graphic artist, Amanita Design founder and CEO)
- Jaromír Plachý (game designer, animator, graphic artist)
- Václav Blín (animator, graphic artist)
- Adolf Lachman (graphic artist, painter, sculptor)
- Tomáš Dvořák (Floex) (musician)
- Tomáš Dvořák (Pif) (sound effects designer, production assistant, CFO)
- DVA (musicians) – Bára Ungerová and Jan Kratochvíl
- David Oliva (programmer)
- Jan Werner (programmer)
- Peter Stehlík (programmer)

== Awards ==
Phonopolis

- Annual Independent Games Festival – Excellence in Visual Art (2024)

Creaks

- Adventure Gamers – The Aggie Awards – Best Sound Effects (2020)
- CEEGA – Best Visual Art (2020)

Pilgrims

- CEEGA – Best Mobile Game (2020)

Chuchel

- Annual Independent Games Festival – Excellence in Visual Art (2018)
- Annual Independent Games Festival – Excellence in Audio Award – nominee (2018)
- Adventure Gamers – The Aggie Awards – Best Character, Animation and Sound Effects (2018)
- CEEGA – Best Visual Art (2018)

Samorost 3

- Annual Independent Games Festival – Excellence in Visual Art – nominee (2014)
- Annual Independent Games Festival – Excellence in Audio Award – nominee (2014)
- Adventure Gamers – The Aggie Awards – Best Non-Traditional Adventure (2016)

Botanicula

- IndieCade – Story / World Design Award (2012)
- Annual Independent Games Festival – Excellence in Audio Award (2012)
- Annual Independent Games Festival – Excellence in Visual Art – nominee (2012)
- Adventure Gamers – The Aggie Awards – Best Animation (2012)

Machinarium

- Annual Independent Games Festival – Excellence in Visual Art Award (2009)
- DICE Awards – Nomination for 13th Annual Interactive Achievement Awards (2009)
- Gamasutra – Best Indie Game of 2009
- VGChartz.com – Best Indie Game of 2009
- PC Gamer – Best Soundtrack of 2009

Questionaut

- British Academy Award (BAFTA) – nominee (2009)
- Mochis Award – Best Game Art (2009)

Samorost 2

- Flashforward Film Festival – winner in Original Sound category (2006)
- Seoul net festival – Best Web-Work Award (2006)
- Webby Award – winner in games category (2007)
- Annual Independent Games Festival – Best Web Browser Game (2007)

Samorost

- Top Talent Award – nominee (2003)
- Webby Award – nominee (2004)
