= Manu Delago =

Austrian musician (born 1984)

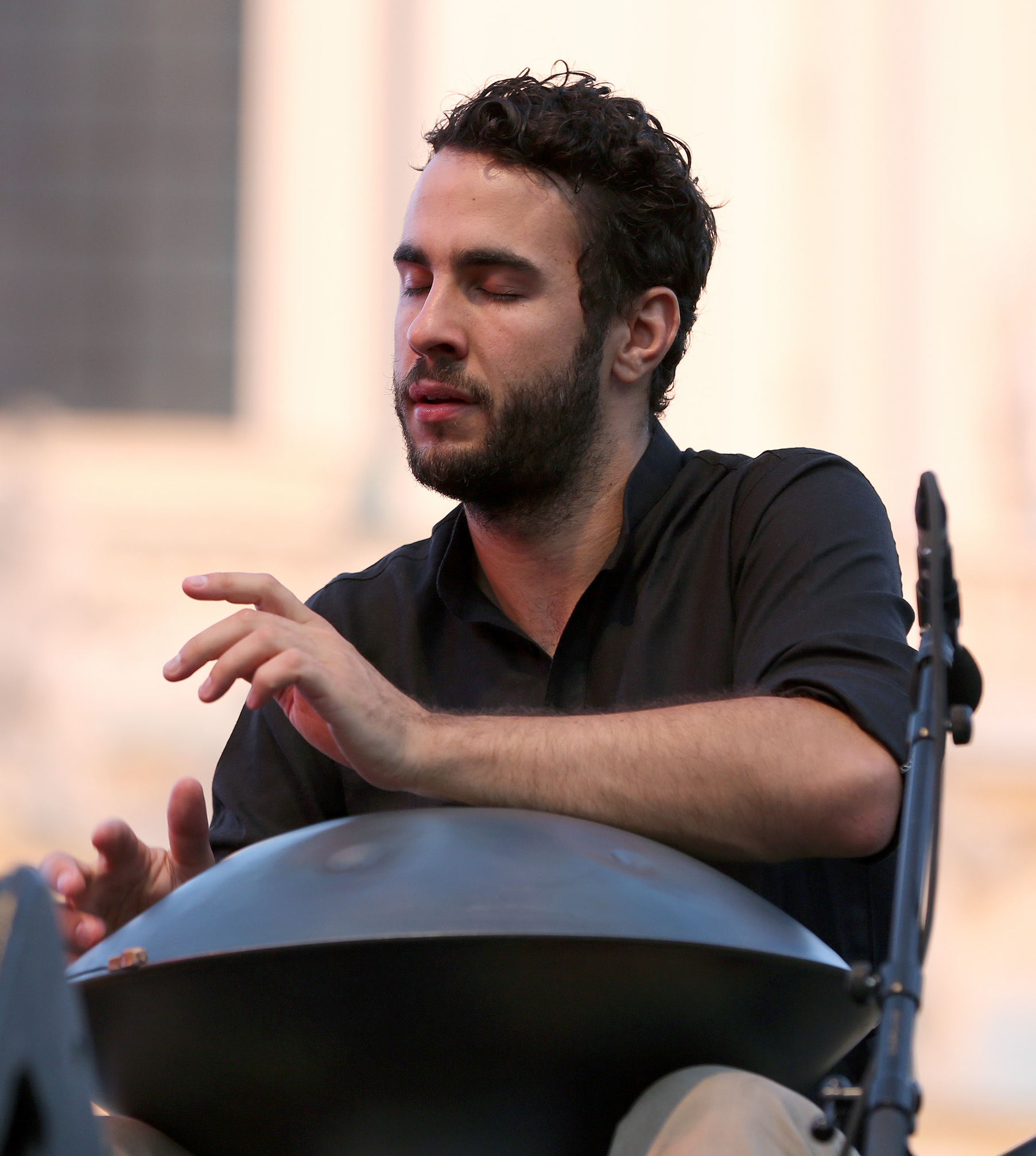
- Delago performing in 2014

Background information
- Born: 31 July 1984 (age 42); Innsbruck, Tyrol, Austria
- Genres: Electronica; Experimental popular music
- Occupations: Musician, composer
- Instruments: Hang, drums, percussion
- Label: Various
- Formerly of: The Cinematic Orchestra
- Website: http://www.manudelago.com/

Manu Delago (born 31 July 1984) is an Austrian musician and composer.

== Biography ==
Delago was born in Innsbruck, Tyrol, and took music lessons as a child in accordion and piano. As a teenager he mainly played drums for various rock bands. In 2003 he picked up the Hang, which gradually turned into one of his main musical instruments.

After graduating from the Mozarteum, Innsbruck, in classical percussion, Delago moved to London and studied jazz drums at the Guildhall School of Music & Drama, beginning his focus on the Swiss instrument, Hang. Later he studied composition at the Trinity College of Music in London. After completing his studies, he worked as a composer, ensemble leader and musician. Since 2007 he has performed internationally including at the Royal Albert Hall, Royal Festival Hall and Barbican in London, Carnegie Hall in New York, the Sydney Opera House and Fuji Rock Festival in Japan.

== Career ==
Between 2000 and 2007 Delago was working as live and studio drummer for various Austrian bands such as HotchPotch, Zabine, Michael Tschuggnall, Nadine Beiler, Bluatschink and more.

In 2006, after playing together in different bands, Delago and Christoph Pepe Auer founded the first Hang and Bass Clarinet duo in the world called Living Room. The duo has released two albums and a YouTube series called Hang & Bass Clarinet Megahits. He also regularly tours with his own Manu Delago Handmade and 'Manu Delago Ensemble'.

He appeared as a soloist with the London Symphony Orchestra strings, Britten Sinfonia, Metropol Orkest, Aurora Orchestra, Münchner Kammerorchester, Züricher Kammerorchester and various other orchestras. His solo piece Mono Desire was listed in the Top30 best-rated music videos on YouTube.

Delago has featured as percussionist and hang player for several of Björk's shows, starting with the Biophilia tour up until the Cornucopia performances. He also performed percussion with The Cinematic Orchestra from 2014-2016 and with Ólafur Arnalds in 2018.

He was a composer, musician and assistant engineer for Anoushka Shankar's 2016 album Land of Gold. He also accompanied her on her world tour. Together with the Metropol Orkest they recorded the album 'Between us' which was nominated for a 'Best Global Album' Grammy award.

In 2018 Delago released Parasol Peak – an album and film in which Manu Delago leads an ensemble of seven musicians on a mountaineering expedition in the Alps.

== Discography ==
=== Albums ===
- 2024 – Manu Delago – Snow from Yesterday
- 2021 – Manu Delago – Environ Me
- 2020 – Manu Delago – Circadian Live
- 2019 – Manu Delago – Circadian
- 2018 – Manu Delago – Parasol Peak
- 2018 – Manu Delago – Metromonk Unplugged EP
- 2017 – Manu Delago – Metromonk
- 2015 – Manu Delago – Silver Kobalt
- 2013 – Manu Delago – Bigger Than Home
- 2012 – Manu Delago & London Symphony Orchestra strings – Manuscripts
- 2010 – Living Room (Christoph Pepe Auer & Manu Delago) – Colouring Book
- 2010 – Manu Delago – Made in Silence 2
- 2008 – Manu Delago – Adventions
- 2007 – Manu Delago – Handmade
- 2007 – Christoph Pepe Auer & Manu Delago – Living Room
- 2006 – Manu Delago – Made in Silence

=== Features ===
- 2016 – Land of Gold – Anoushka Shankar
- 2016 – Vulnicura live – Björk
- 2016 – Land of Gold – Anoushka Shankar
- 2015 – Why don't you – Joss Stone
- 2013 – A long way – Andreya Triana
- 2013 – Traces of You – Anoushka Shankar
- 2011 – Virus – Björk
- 2009 – Nothing is something worth doing – Shpongle
- 2009 – Live in Concert – Shpongle (DVD)
- 2008 – Arigato – Boris Grebenshchikov

=== Further compositions ===
- 2015 – Newton's Rainbow (hang, sarod & string orchestra)
- 2014 – Secret Corridor (hang, electronics & string quartet)
- 2012 – Concertino Grosso (hang & string orchestra)
- 2012 – CHS (hang & female choir in six parts)
- 2011 – Chaos_Equalibrium (string quartet & dance)
- 2010 – Why does one hide from six? (Würfelspiel für gemischtes Ensemble – dice game for a mixed ensemble)
- 2009 – Pencilphonie No. 1 in Hb2 (a self-portrait for pencil, eraser & sharpener)
- 2009 – 5 ft 12 (Marimba solo)
- 2009 – Los Cepillos de Dientes (music for 2 acoustic toothbrushes)
- 2007 – If you’re really right, will be proved by the light (3 players on 2 marimbas)
