= Chuchel =

2018 video game

- Developer: Amanita Design
- Publisher: Amanita Design
- Designer: Jaromír Plachý
- Composer: DVA
- Engine: Adobe Flash
- Platforms: Windows; macOS; Android; iOS; tvOS
- Release: macOS, Windows; 7 March 2018; Android, iOS; 29 November 2018
- Genre: Graphic adventure
- Mode: Single-player

Chuchel (Czech pronunciation: [ˈxuxɛl]) is a 2018 video game developed by Amanita Design.

== Story ==
The game follows the protagonist Chuchel, a Dust-style creature, as he tries to retrieve a cherry stolen by a giant one early morning, with his all-in-one best friend, enemy and pet Kekel either helping or hindering him on the way. The game is structured into short, loosely connected episodes of Chuchel's struggles to retrieve and keep the cherry; the episodic nature is emphasized by some levels showing the title.

In the last level, it is revealed that the giant hand teasing Chuchel with the cherry is in fact a larger Chuchel-style creature named Chrchel; it swallows Chuchel and Kekel who retrieve the cherry from its stomach, and climb up to its brain to switch it from "grumpy" to "happy". The now-happy giant then delivers Chuchel and Kekel back to their home, where they finally split and eat the cherry, only to get a huge pile brought by the giant, who then starts chasing a large pear carried by an even larger hand.

== Gameplay ==
The game consists of 30 levels. The player controls the eponymous Chuchel whose task is to retrieve a cherry. Levels are different and most of them are played as point-and-click adventure but some consist of minigames including spoofs of Pac-Man, Flappy Bird, Tetris, Space Invaders, Donkey Kong and Super Mario Bros. When Chuchel retrieves the Cherry, antagonist Chrchel shows up and steals it. Chuchel is aided by his pet Kekel who helps him to get the Cherry.

== Development ==
Original colour on the left and the current colour is on the right.

The game was developed by Amanita Design. Designer Jaromír Plachý started to work on the game after he finished Botanicula in 2012. Plachý stated that he wanted to make an interactive cartoon with funny animation. He came up with the character of Chuchel (the word "chuchel" does not "officially" exist, but it's an apparent combination of two similar Czech words "chumel" (clamp or tangle) and "chuchvalec" (tangled mass or clot)) when he decided to draw the first thing that comes to his mind. Plachý then designed environments and turned them into actual levels.

On December 20, 2018, Amanita Design released an update for the game changing Chuchel's body color to orange, in response to the character design being interpreted as blackface by some players. Some levels were also slightly changed to match Chuchel's new colour.

== Reception ==
Reception

Aggregate scores
Aggregator	Score
Metacritic	PC: 81/100 iOS: 78/100
OpenCritic	80/100

Review score
Publication	Score
Edge	8/10

Chuchel received generally positive reviews from critics. It holds 81/100 on Metacritic.

On review aggregate website OpenCritic, Chuchel had an average 80 out of 100 review score with 67% approval rating based on 20 reviews.

=== Accolades ===
Year	Award	Category	Result	Ref.
2018	Annual Independent Games Festival	Excellence in Visual Art	Won	
2018	Annual Independent Games Festival	Excellence in Audio	Nominated	
2018	The Aggie Awards	Best Character	Won	
2018	The Aggie Awards	Best Animation	Won	
2018	The Aggie Awards	Best Sound Effects	Won	
2018	Golden Joystick Awards	Best Visual Design	Nominated	
2018	New York Game Awards	Tin Pan Alley Award for Best Music in a Game	Nominated	
2018	Edge Awards	Best Visual Design	Runner-Up	
