= Brain teaser =

Puzzle requiring thought to solve

A brain teaser is a form of puzzle that requires thought to solve. It often requires thinking in unconventional ways with given constraints in mind; sometimes it also involves lateral thinking. Logic puzzles and riddles are specific types of brain teasers.

One of the earliest known brain teaser enthusiasts was the Greek mathematician Archimedes. He devised mathematical problems for his contemporaries to solve.

== Example ==
A brain teaser may be a mathematical puzzle:

Q: If three men can dig three holes in three hours, how many holes can one man dig in one hour?
A: One third of a hole. (In one hour three men have dug one hole; with a third of that work being done only a third of a hole will be dug.)

It may require some attentive lateral thinking:

Q: Mary's father has five daughters: the oldest is Nana, followed by Nene, Nini and Nono. What is the name of the fifth daughter?
A: Mary. (Not, as the pattern might suggest, Nunu.)

It may be a riddle:

Q: I have a bed but cannot sleep, and have a bank but no money, what am I?
A: A river.

== Intuition ==
The difficulty of many brain teasers relies on a certain degree of fallacy in human intuitiveness. This is most common in brain teasers relating to conditional probability, because the causal human mind tends to consider absolute probability instead. As a result, controversial discussions emerge from such problems. One of the famous brain teasers is the Monty Hall problem. Another (simpler) example of such a brain teaser is the Boy or Girl paradox.

== See also ==
- Board games
- Mathematical game
- Mensa
- Mind sport
- Boy or Girl paradox
