= Botanicula =

2012 video game

- Developer: Amanita Design
- Publishers: Amanita Design; EU: Daedalic Entertainment
- Designer: Jaromír Plachý
- Composer: DVA
- Engine: Adobe Flash
- Platforms: Linux; Mac OS X Microsoft Windows iOS; Android
- Release: Linux, Mac OS X, Windows; 19 April 2012 iOS; 1 May 2014
- Genre: Graphic adventure game
- Mode: Single-player

Botanicula is a point-and-click adventure game developed by Amanita Design. The game was released on 19 April 2012, for Microsoft Windows, Mac OS X and Linux. The game was later ported to iOS and Android.

== Gameplay ==
Like the previous games from Amanita Design, in Botanicula the player controls a protagonist (or multiple protagonists) while exploring the environment, solving puzzles and collecting items that are required for the obstacles that come in their way. The player is able to interact with other creatures and find Easter eggs that are present in the lush environment. Like Machinarium, the game has no spoken or written dialogue.

== Plot ==
Botanicula follows the adventure of five botanical creatures (named Mr. Lantern, Mr. Twig, Mr. Poppy Head, Mr. Feather and Mrs. Mushroom) who are trying to save the last seed of their home tree from evil parasitic creatures that have infested their home.

== Characters ==
- Mr. Lantern – The main protagonist of Botanicula. He is a small orange creature, and portrays a Physalis. He can absorb seeds within his body. This makes him glow and gives him power.
- Mrs. Mushroom – The second playable character. She can create identical copies of herself. Another power that she has is to shrink.
- Mr. Poppyhead – The most robust member of the group and the third playable character. He portrays the seed capsule of a Poppy.
- Mr. Twig – Another playable character. He resembles a twig. He has many arms that he can expand. He also has the ability to spurt flowers.
- Mr. Feather – The last playable character. He is very small but can fly.

== Reception ==
Reception

Aggregate score
Aggregator	Score
Metacritic	PC: 82/100 iOS: 88/100

Review scores
Publication	Score
Adventure Gamers	4.5/5
Destructoid	8/10
Eurogamer	7/10
Game Informer	8.25/10
GameSpot	8/10
IGN	9/10
PC Gamer (US)	82/100
Pocket Gamer	(iOS) 4.5/5
TouchArcade	(iOS) 4.5/5
VideoGamer.com	8/10

The game received overwhelmingly positive reviews from critics. It was praised for its music and visuals, as well as gameplay. However, other reviews noted a lack of replay value.

IGN highly recommended the game, writing, "It may not be as hilarious as adventure games of yesteryear, but it's persistently delightful, oozing character and grabbing hold of the imagination." Destructoid praised Botanicula's world, visuals, and its ability to straddle the line between traditional adventure game and experimental art game. Eurogamer gave the game a seven out of ten and appreciated the vast variety of secrets present in the game. Game Informer noted that the game "goes wrong in a few important ways", criticizing the maze-like navigation and trial-and-error-dependent puzzles while highly recommending the game to old-school adventure gamers. PC Gamer lamented that the game could occasionally be "staggeringly vague", while praising the game's aesthetics, writing, "Avoid it like a parasitical spider if you're not willing to play on its own terms, but embrace it mightily if you're willing to give it a shot." GameSpot praised the game's visuals, puzzles, characters, and soundtrack, writing, "To play Botanicula is to peer through a microscope at hidden world and feel like you've made the greatest of discoveries: one of a place that's so overflowing with imagination and so full of wonder that only a person with a heart of stone would fail to be taken in by its charms."

Botanicula won the 14th annual award in 'Excellence in Audio' at Independent Games Festival 2012. The game was also a showcased nominee and received the Story/World Design award at IndieCade (the International Festival of Independent Games) in 2012. Botanicula also won a European Games Award 2012 in the category Best European Adventure Game. Botanicula was elected in the Booom competition as the Best Czech video game of 2012. The game also appeared on Anifilm in 2012 where it was given the Czech Video Game of the Year Award for artistic contribution to Czech video game output.

== Gallery ==
Mr. Lantern, Mrs. Mushroom, Mr. Poppy Head, Mr. Feather and Mr. Twig

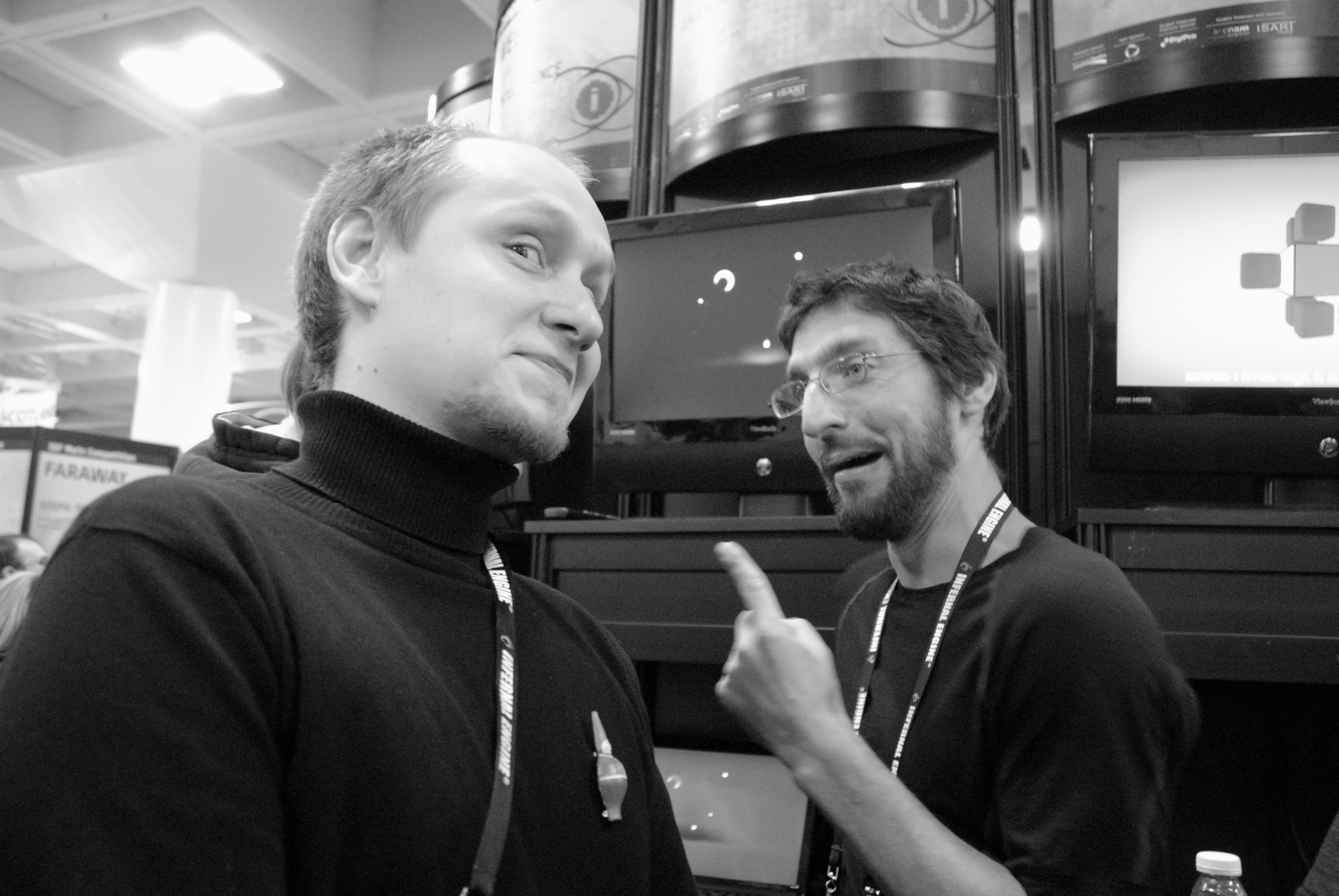
Jaromír Plachý, designer of Botanicula, and Jakub Dvorský, Amanita Design founder

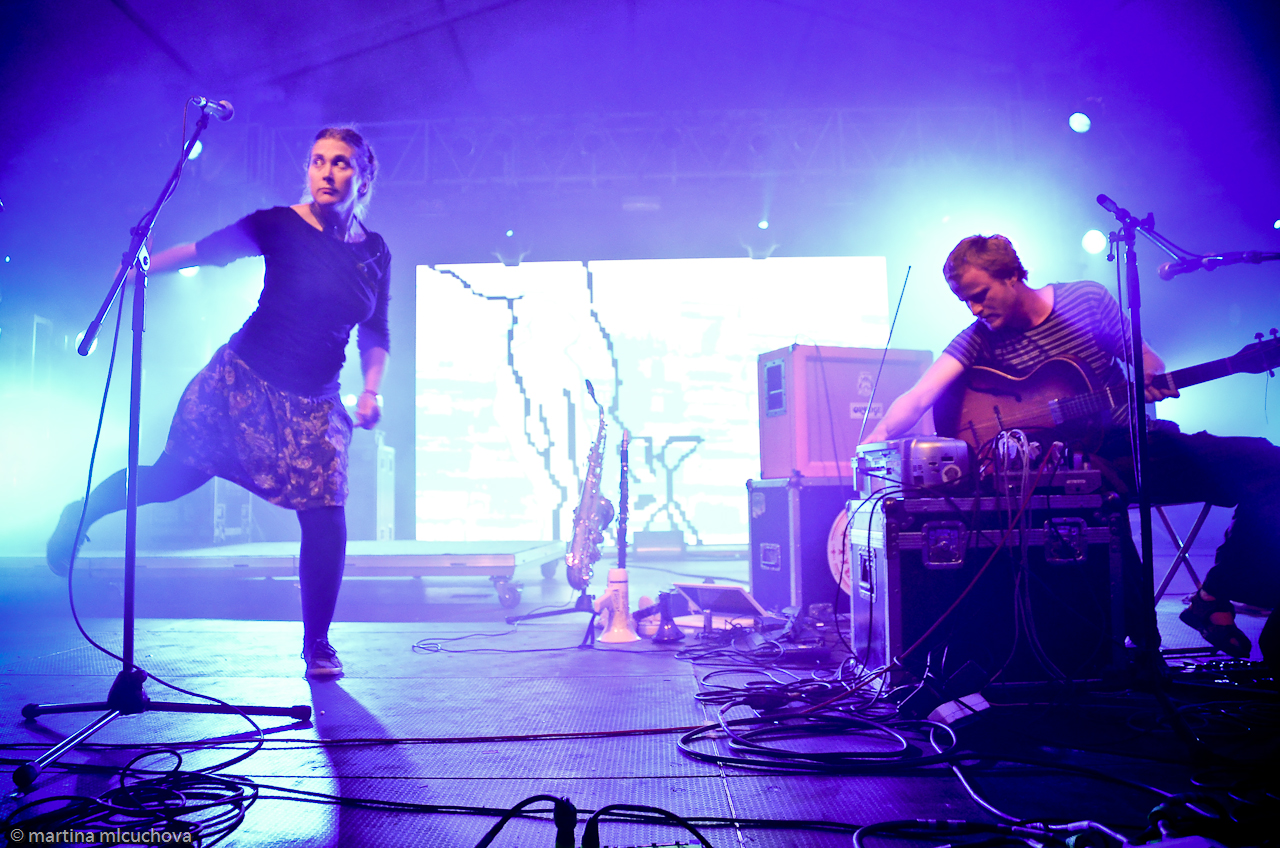
The band DVA created all music and sounds of Botanicula.
