= Frostpunk =

2018 video game

- Developer: 11 Bit Studios
- Publisher: 11 Bit Studios
- Director: Michał Drozdowski
- Producer: Błażej Żywiczyński
- Designers: Jakub Stokalski; Michał Drozdowski
- Programmers: Aleksander Kauch; Rafał Podkowiński
- Artists: Przemysław Marszał; Łukasz Juszczyk
- Composer: Piotr Musiał
- Engine: Liquid Engine (original); Unreal Engine 5 (1886)
- Platforms: Microsoft Windows; PlayStation 4; Xbox One; macOS; iOS; Android; Nintendo Switch
- Release: 24 April 2018: Microsoft Windows; 24 April 2018; PlayStation 4, Xbox One; 11 October 2019; macOS; 24 February 2021; iOS, Android; 29 October 2024; Nintendo Switch; 19 October 2026; Frostpunk 1886; 2027
- Genres: City-building, survival
- Mode: Single-player

Frostpunk is a 2018 city-building survival video game developed and published by 11 Bit Studios. Players take on the role of a leader in an alternate history set in the late 19th century, in which they must build and maintain a city during an apocalyptic global winter. The player manages resources, makes choices on how to survive, and explores the area outside their city for survivors, resources, or other useful items. The game features several scenarios to undertake, each with its own stories and different challenges. The main campaign adopts a three-act structure, requiring players to grapple with internal conflict and societal turmoil in a divided city and survive a great storm that threatens to overwhelm the city, making sacrifices and morally grey ethical decisions along the way.

Frostpunk was 11 Bit Studios' next project following This War of Mine (2014), the unexpected success of which prompted the studio to focus on creating what it called "meaningful entertainment". The studio was more ambitious with the game's scale and scope, with more than 60 team members working on the game. Unlike This War of Mine, which focuses on an individual's struggles, Frostpunk explores issues faced by society as a whole and whether or not players are willing to challenge their beliefs and morals in times of adversity. The team was inspired by Jacek Dukaj's novel Ice (2007) as well as reports of near-death experiences, such as accounts from early polar explorers and survivors of the Andes flight disaster.

Announced in August 2016, the game was initially released for Microsoft Windows in April 2018 and was later made available for PlayStation 4 and Xbox One in October 2019 and macOS in February 2021. 11 Bit Studios has partnered with NetEase Games to release a port for iOS and Android titled Frostpunk: Beyond the Ice in October 2024. The game will also receive a port for Nintendo Switch in October 2026. The game received generally positive reviews upon release. Critics praised the game's art style, gameplay focused on crisis management, and ethical choices while criticizing its lack of replay value. It sold over 5 million copies within six years of its release. 11 Bit Studios supported the game with downloadable content following release. A sequel, Frostpunk 2, was released in September 2024. An expanded version of the game, titled Frostpunk 1886, created using Unreal Engine 5, is set to be released in 2027.

== Gameplay ==
Players construct buildings along a circular grid surrounding the generator, which produces heat for the whole city.

In Frostpunk, players must build and maintain a city named New London during a worldwide volcanic winter. They must manage the well-being of citizens, keeping their hope high and discontent low. The game starts out with a small group of survivors and several small caches of supplies with which to build a city. These supplies will quickly run out, and players must construct new facilities such as sawmills, hunting huts, mines, and factories to harvest raw materials (coal, wood, steel, and food) in order to keep their society warm and healthy in the midst of fluctuating cold temperatures. When the players have a surplus of resources, they can be stockpiled in large resource depots for subsequent use. In most scenarios, the city is centred around a massive coal-fired generator that produces heat in a circular radius, which can be extended and upgraded throughout the game to increase its area of coverage and heating. All buildings, therefore, are placed on a circular grid surrounding the generator. Habitations, medical facilities, and workplaces must be insulated to prevent becoming inoperable or causing frostbite and illness in the city's occupants. The generator may shut down if there is insufficient coal, or explode if the player keeps overloading it to meet heat demand, ending the game.

Workers and engineers can be assigned to work at various facilities. Citizens will only work during the warm daylight hours, though emergency shifts can be enforced to further boost productivity when the city is running out of supplies. Some facilities can be fully automated with the employment of giant autonomous machines called "Automatons", which are created using "Steam Cores". As players progress, the ever-colder temperature makes city management progressively difficult. Building a workshop structure allows players to research technology and buildings that will make the city more efficient. Existing buildings can be upgraded to the newly researched ones provided that players have sufficient resources. Through research, players can also construct a beacon to scout the surrounding frozen wasteland for additional survivors and resources, learning about what happened to the rest of the world in the process. Scouting is the only way for the city to expand their workforce. More locations will be unlocked as players complete various expeditions, and players can construct outposts and supply lines at certain locations, which will provide New London with new supplies and raw materials regularly.

Many decisions players make will alter the level of hope and discontent of citizens in the city. If hope is too low, or discontent is too high for an extended period of time, the citizens of New London will revolt against the player and the game will also end. Players have the option to use laws to regulate the productivity of their society at the cost of possibly raising discontent, e.g., allowing child labour or forcing temporary 24-hour shifts, but also laws to develop better healthcare like prosthetics or build entertainment facilities like a pub to increase hope. Players also have the option to make decisions for individual citizens in the game. For instance, the players can choose whether a child who had hurt himself at work should be reprimanded for his carelessness or be given a day off to rest. In most scenarios, players have the option to increase the citizens' support either by "Order" which includes buildings and laws to enforce security, or by "Faith", which includes buildings and laws that implement a religion. These two paths can be continued to the point of fanaticism, with the city falling under complete totalitarian rule, effectively discarding the hope/discontent system. In addition, a platform is constructed to execute enemies or unbelievers by scalding them to death with steam from the generator.

== Plot ==
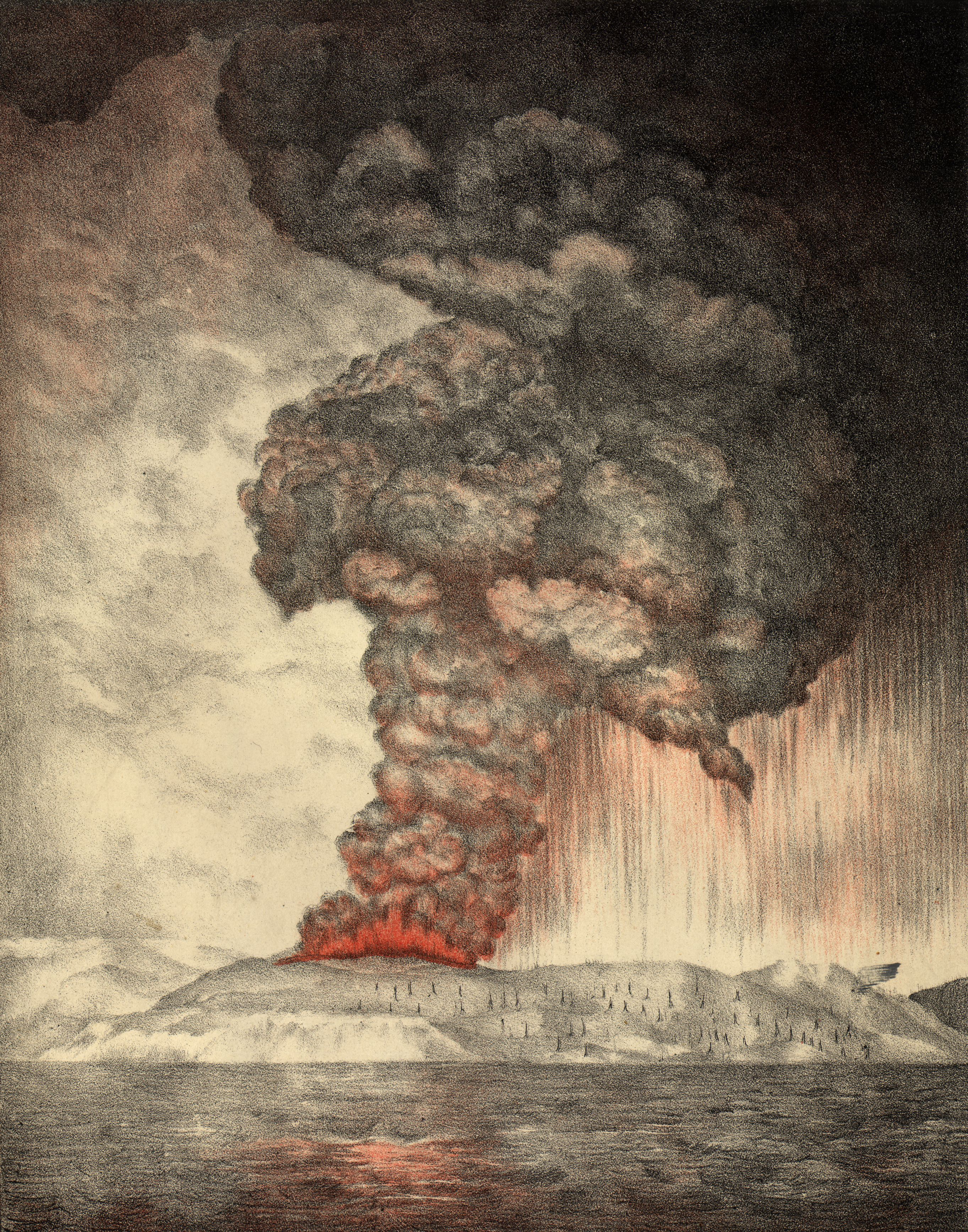
In the game, the eruptions of Krakatoa resulted in a volcanic winter, leading to the collapse of civilizations worldwide.

The game is set in an alternate 1886 when the eruptions of Krakatoa and other unknown events trigger a worldwide volcanic winter. This in turn led to widespread crop failure and the death of millions. In response to this, several installations called "generators" were built by the British Empire and the United States in the coal-rich North, designed to be city centres in the event that dropping temperatures force mass migration from the South. In all scenarios, the player is the leader of a city or outpost, usually around a generator, and must manage resources to ensure the city's survival.

The game launched with three scenarios, each with different backgrounds and storylines. The main story, "A New Home", involves refugees from London settling in their own city, which becomes known as "New London"; the settlers must face a "Great Storm", while also contending with the fall of the nearby city of Winterhome. "The Arks" is centred around a largely automated city run by scientists from Oxford and Cambridge, seeking to preserve plant samples taken prior to the global cooling. "The Refugees" involves a group that has taken over a generator intended for wealthy nobles' use and the ensuing social struggle.

Three additional scenarios were added as downloadable content, one free to all players and two as part of the Season Pass. "The Fall of Winterhome", the free scenario, is a prequel set immediately before "A New Home", with the residents of Winterhome forced to evacuate their city due to a failing generator. "The Last Autumn" is also a prequel, set in a fictional landmass just before the global winter begins, involving the construction of a generator for the evacuation of Liverpool. "On the Edge" is a sequel to "A New Home", centred around an outpost established by New London after the "Great Storm".

Endless Mode was also introduced in a later patch. This mode eschews narrative elements to focus on surviving for as long as possible while weathering intermediate storms. The DLCs from the Season Pass added additional settings for Endless Mode, such as "The Builders", which involves building a generator (based on "The Last Autumn") during winter conditions.

== Development ==
Frostpunk was developed by Polish developer 11 Bit Studios, the company behind This War of Mine. Codenamed Industrial, the team described it as a significant "step-up" when compared with their past efforts. 60 people contributed to the project. As Frostpunk was a larger project with more complicated gameplay systems, the team had to crunch towards the end of the game's development.

The unexpected success of This War of Mine changed the studio's philosophy, with it focusing on creating what it called "meaningful entertainment". The team felt the seriousness and the hard themes explored in This War of Mine resonated with players and wanted their next game to carry similar themes. Its success enabled the team to be more ambitious with the game's scale and scope, exploring issues faced by society as a whole instead of individual struggles. The team wanted the experience to prompt players to "ask questions about yourself, about society in general, and the dynamic we currently see today in the world". Lead designer Kuba Stokalski positioned the game as an experience exploring how willing players are to "sacrifice" their morals and ideals to achieve a better outcome. While the game is set in a fictional setting, the citizens were ultimately grappling with modern-day social issues in a different context. The alternate history setting allowed the team to "push the levers pressuring societies to extremes". The team was inspired by the events in the 19th century, which Stokalski described as "a period of social stratification with masses of the workers"; the Luddites rebellion against automated machinery; and the rise of artificial intelligence in modern day.

Early attempts at polar exploration inspired the team.

The team was inspired by reports about accidents and other near-death experiences, such as attempts at polar exploration, the Andes flight disaster, as well as tragic events surrounding mountaineers such as Joe Simpson and Aron Ralston. They also explored the transformation of the human psyche during sustained stress, with the team researching the psychological profile of people working on the International Space Station and at research stations in Antarctica. These experiences were then turned into playable systems, namely the hope/discontent meters shown in the game's user interface. The meters served as an aggregation of the overall satisfaction and mood of each individual citizen in New London. The discontent meter reflected citizens' responses to laws and the player's handling of societal matters, while the hope meter was introduced after the team identified it as an essential driver for human survival during adversity. The player is tasked to give the citizens of New London "reasons to survive" instead of treating them merely as animals struggling for survival. Players must balance hope and discontent, or they will lose the game.

The game's winter setting was inspired by Ice, a novel by Jacek Dukaj. However, harsh weather was only one of the threats to New London. Its main campaign had a three-act structure. The first act teaches the players the basics of survival, the second act tasks players to grapple with internal conflict and societal turmoil in a divided city, while the third act challenges players to survive a huge storm, whereas players have to make tough decisions in order to survive. The development team reiterated that Frostpunk was not a sandbox city-builder. It was a story-driven game about "politics" and "being a leader." The team once considered allowing players to continue building their cities following the great storm, but this plan was scrapped as they felt that it was anticlimactic. The team wanted the game to end after reaching a big climax, similar to a novel.

An early design goal was to enable players to shape and guide the in-game society. The team implemented an early system in which individual citizens struggling with a problem will make a request, and players can react by choosing one from several choices to resolve the issue. To increase players' agency, the team subsequently changed it to the law system, allowing players to pass new regulations actively. One of the themes the team wanted to reflect was creeping normality. Laws of similar nature are placed in a sequence. While early laws may not affect the status quo significantly, subsequent laws will be more aggressive in nature and result in significant consequences. Players may choose to make small concessions that were against their personal beliefs to achieve a better outcome, though this may create a snowball effect, forcing players to make even larger compromises in the future. The regulations were inspired by historical events. For instance, the use of child labourers was prevalent during the Victoria era, and Russia had a history of adding sawdust to food during times of hardship. The team spent an extensive amount of time adjusting the moral dilemmas faced by players so that they would not be too subtle to notice or too exaggerated to become comical. Choices in the game were often morally grey, though the game will not judge or comment on any choice made by players.

== Release ==
Frostpunk was announced in August 2016. The developers were initially targeting a release in late 2017, but it was delayed until 24 April 2018. The game was unable to support official mod support due to technical limitations. 11 Bit Studios released the game for PlayStation 4 and Xbox One in October 2019. Frostpunk was developed using an internal game engine named Liquid Engine, though it presented technical challenges for console porting. Ports to iOS and Android were developed by NetEase Games. The mobile versions, titled Frostpunk: Beyond the Ice, added multiplayer functionality, enabling players to trade between each other as well as a variety of minigames. Beyond the Ice was published by Com2uS on 29 October 2024. A port for Nintendo Switch is scheduled to release on 19 October 2026.

11 Bit Studios supported the game with downloadable content. A free scenario named "The Fall of Winterhome" was released in September 2018. An endless mode, which allows players to build and expand their city without being constrained by the narrative, was released in November 2018. It has two difficulty modes: Serenity, in which harsh weather events occurred less frequently, and Endurance, which was more difficult than the base game as random parts of the city will shut down. A festive DLC pack named A Christmas Carol was released in December 2018, adding a new Christmas-themed quest and festive buildings to the game's endless mode. The first of three expansion packs for season pass owners, The Rifts, was released on 27 August 2019, adding a new map to the game's endless mode and introducing new gameplay features such as the ability to construct bridges. The second pack, titled The Last Autumn, was released on 21 January 2020. As a prequel to the main game, players must build an outpost in Site 113 before the location is overwhelmed by the storm. The final pack, titled On The Edge, was released on 20 August 2020, introducing a new scenario revolving around an outpost that must rely on supplies from New London to survive. All three paid DLC packs were released for consoles on 26 July 2021 alongside a "Complete Edition" for the game.

=== Frostpunk 1886 ===
In April 2025, 11 Bit Studios announced Frostpunk 1886, a revamped version of the original game with new gameplay mechanics, laws and a new Purpose path. It will utilize Unreal Engine 5 in order to support user-created mods at launch. The game is set to be released in 2027.

== Reception ==
Reception

Aggregate score
Aggregator	Score
Metacritic	PC: 84/100; PS4: 87/100; XONE: 84/100

Review scores
Publication	Score
Eurogamer	Recommended
Game Informer	8.75/10
GameSpot	9/10
IGN	9/10
PC Gamer (US)	89/100
PCGamesN	8/10
Shacknews	8/10

Frostpunk received "generally favorable reviews" according to review aggregator Metacritic. It sold over 250,000 copies within three days of its release, over 1.4 million within a year, 3 million within three years, and over 5 million within six years.

Julian Benson from PCGamesN remarked that the game was unexpectedly easy as a management game, having completed its campaign in a single trial, and wrote that the game was special with its focus on the "macro moral decisions of a leader". He wrote that balancing the demands of the citizens and maintaining the hope/discontent level was the game's most challenging aspect. Daniel Starkey from GameSpot liked how emergent events will often challenge the player's long-term strategy, forcing players to make tough calls frequently during the game's campaign as they needed to balance "the will of the people against their own needs". Matt Bertz from Game Informer called the game an overwhelming experience at times. He liked the game's focus on crisis management, though he felt that some mechanics were poorly explained to players. Christopher Livingston from PC Gamer also liked how consequential each choice can be, and managing the overall citizen satisfaction created a "masterful expression of the burden of leadership." Caley Roark from IGN praised the game for combining elements from various strategy games and described the overall gameplay premise as an "inverse Tropico." Several critics remarked that since the game was not a sandbox city-builder, replay value was limited. Despite making different choices in a second playthrough, the overall story beats in the main campaign were the same.

Bertz was impressed by the ethical choices featured in the game and liked how they often challenged his own beliefs and morals, adding that "[r]arely does an interactive experience keep me awake at night wrestling with big decisions." Livingston described the game as a "tense, gripping, and often stressful survival strategy game filled with difficult, sometimes unthinkable choices", and players have to choose between being a benevolent leader or an effective one. Starkey wrote that the morality choices made Frostpunk stand out from other city-building games, as players' choices are often presented with tangible consequences and reactions from citizens. Writing for Rock, Paper, Shotgun, Xavier Nelson Jr. applauded the game for constantly forcing players to juggle between priorities, as players have to react quickly as discontent quickly rises or hope falls, describing the title as a "tense" experience. However, he lamented that if players failed to establish any emotional or personal connections with the citizens, they were always likely to make choices that favour gameplay gains, and there was no way to avoid making these choices simply by playing better. Robert Purchese from Eurogamer liked how the choices players made in the game shaped the story of the city, but he was disappointed that the game never judged the players for their decisions, making some of them feel hollow. Ars Technica's Steven Strom remarked that smaller choices featured in the game made each player's campaign unique, and Steven T. Wright (also writing for Ars Technica) described Frostpunk as "perhaps the most dire and realistic climate change game on the market".

Nelson Jr. called the game "breathtaking", though he remarked that the aesthetics made it difficult for players to recognize buildings from afar. Bertz also liked the game's "barren" visual style for matching the game's grim atmosphere. Livingston added that the game had "extraordinary style and art design" and praised its grim depiction of civilization in the midst of a volcanic winter. Roark liked the game's minimalistic art style for making "each bit of color seem like a touch of warmth in the snow", and compared the game's aesthetics to Game of Thrones. Purchese praised the team's attention to detail and the game's sound design for making the city lively under close inspection.

=== Awards and nominations ===
Year	Award	Category	Result	Ref.
2017	Game Critics Awards 2017	Best Strategy Game	Nominated	
2018	Brazil Independent Games Festival Awards	Best Game	Won	
2018	Brazil Independent Games Festival Awards	Best Gameplay	Nominated	
2018	Golden Joystick Awards 2018	Best Visual Design	Nominated	
2018	Golden Joystick Awards 2018	PC Game of the Year	Nominated	
2018	The Game Awards 2018	Best Strategy Game	Nominated	
2019	22nd Annual D.I.C.E. Awards	Strategy/Simulation Game of the Year	Nominated	
2019	Game Audio Network Guild Awards	Music of the Year	Nominated	
2019	Game Audio Network Guild Awards	Best Original Soundtrack Album	Nominated	
2019	Game Audio Network Guild Awards	Best Music for an Indie Game	Nominated	
2019	15th British Academy Games Awards	Narrative	Nominated	

== Legacy ==
A sequel was announced on 12 August 2021. Frostpunk 2 is set in New London, 30 years after the "Great Storm" of the original game, and the consequences of the advent of the petroleum industry in New London. The game was released on 20 September 2024.

A Frostpunk board game designed by Jakub Wiśniewski and Glass Cannon Unplugged was funded via Kickstarter in October 2020.

British nerdcore musician The Stupendium in 2018 released the song "Shelter from the Storm", depicting the founding of New London sung from the perspective of the Captain and his followers.

According to Christopher Livingston from PC Gamer, Frostpunk became an influence on a number of city-building games. Its expedition mechanic, which interweaves narrative with exploration, can be seen in games such as The Wandering Village, Ixion, and Aquatico, while its focus on politics can also be seen in games such as Urbek City Builder and Floodland.

== See also ==
- The Ice Schooner by Michael Moorcock
