= Christopher Larkin (composer) =

Australian composer of soundtracks

- Born: Christopher James Larkin; Adelaide, South Australia, Australia
- Education: University of Adelaide
- Genre: Video game music
- Occupations: Composer, musician
- Instrument: Piano
- Years active: 2012–present
- Website: composerlarkin.com

Christopher James Larkin is an Australian composer for video games, film, and television, best known for his work on Hollow Knight (2017) and its sequel Hollow Knight: Silksong (2025). Some of his other works include the music for Pac-Man 256 (2015), Outfolded (2016), TOHU (2021), and Hacknet (2015).

== Early life and education ==
Christopher James Larkin was born in Adelaide, South Australia.

Larkin studied composition at Brighton Secondary School, then at the Elder Conservatorium of Music at the University of Adelaide.

Larkin began composing music at a young age and collaborated with filmmaking students while he attended the Elder Conservatorium.

In October 2015, he submitted his thesis for an MPhil in music composition, entitled "Orchestrating the wasteland: sample library engineering as an integral process of realising the music for Wastelander Panda".

== Career ==
Larkin composed the score for the web series Wastelander Panda: Exile, released in 2014 as a second set of three 10-minute episodes.

He knew Ari Gibson, the co-director of Team Cherry, prior to starting work on their game, Hollow Knight, which was released in 2017. He found out about the project when it was still a Kickstarter and decided to send in a demo for the project. He then worked with Team Cherry to produce a full soundtrack for the game, and it was released in 2017 to critical acclaim.

He later continued his collaboration with Team Cherry, by composing the soundtrack for Hollow Knight's sequel, Hollow Knight: Silksong.

In 2021 Larkin composed the music for the video game TOHU.

He works as a professional composer and sound designer for visual media such as film, TV, and video games.

== Other activities ==
Larkin spoke at the High Score 2023 conference hosted by APRA AMCOS, alongside Yoko Shimomura. He spoke again at High Score 2026.

== Compositional style ==
Larkin integrates elements of his classical training with a diverse range of musical styles. He draws inspiration from Impressionist composers such as Debussy as well as visual-media composers such as James Newton Howard, Joe Hisaishi, and Koji Kondo.

His most notable work, the Hollow Knight soundtrack, is characterised as conveying "dark elegance and melancholy." The soundtrack is largely orchestral and employs recurring leitmotifs throughout different tracks, each often corresponding to a location or character.

For the adventure game TOHU, produced by Fireart Games, Larkin used the digital audio workstation Cubase to create a musical score that reflects the game's whimsical story and visuals. His process involved observing the gameplay sent to him by the developers, and sonically interpreting those visual elements.

== Works ==
Larkin has composed music for the following productions:

Year	Title	Genre
2012	The Adventures of Figaro Pho	TV series
2013	University of Adelaide: "Seek Light"	Commercial
2014	Wastelander Panda: Exile	3-part web series
2015	Pac-Man 256	Video game
2015	Expand	Video game
2015	The New Adventures of Figaro Pho	TV series
2015	Hacknet	Video game
2016	Outfolded	Video game
2017	Barbecue	Documentary
2017	Hollow Knight	Video game
2021	TOHU	Video game
2021	Wrestledunk Sports	Video game
2025	Moonlighter 2: The Endless Vault	Video game
2025	Hollow Knight: Silksong	Video game
2027	Winds of Viridia	Video game

== Awards ==
Year	Award	Category	Result	Ref.
2015	South Australian Screen Awards	Best Composition	Won	
2016	South Australian Screen Awards	Best Sound Design	Won	
2017	Australian Screen Sound Guild Awards	Best Sound for Interactive Media	Won	
2021	South Australian Screen Awards	Best Score	Won	
2025	The Game Awards 2025	Best Score & Music	Nominated	
2026	South Australian Screen Awards	Hollow Knight: Silksong Best Music for a Video Game or Other Media	Nominated	
