= Frostpunk 2 =

2024 video game

- Developer: 11 Bit Studios
- Publisher: 11 Bit Studios
- Directors: Jakub Dzierżykraj-Stokalski; Łukasz Juszczyk
- Designer: Jakub Dzierżykraj-Stokalski
- Programmer: Szymon Jabłoński
- Artist: Łukasz Juszczyk
- Writer: Alexandre Boiret
- Composer: Piotr Musiał
- Engine: Unreal Engine 5
- Platforms: macOS; Windows; PlayStation 5; Xbox Series X/S
- Release: macOS, Windows: September 20, 2024; PlayStation 5, Xbox Series X/S: September 18, 2025
- Genres: City-building, survival
- Mode: Single-player

Frostpunk 2 is a city-building survival video game developed and published by 11 Bit Studios. Set 30 years after the original game, Frostpunk 2 tasks players to take on the role of a leader in an alternate history early 20th century in order to build and manage a city during a catastrophic, worldwide volcanic winter that almost completely destroyed human civilization while making morally and politically controversial choices to ensure its survival. The game was released for macOS and Windows PC on September 20, 2024, with a later release for PlayStation 5 and Xbox Series X and Series S on September 18, 2025.

== Gameplay ==
In Frostpunk 2, players construct districts instead of individual buildings.

Like its predecessor, Frostpunk 2 is a city-building survival video game. Set in New London in 1916, 30 years after the "Great Storm" of the original game, the game explores the consequences of the advent of the petroleum industry, and players assume the role of the city's new leader, "the Steward", who replaces the now-deceased "Captain" (the player character from the first game). The city is struggling with overpopulation, food, and coal shortages, among other issues. Unlike the original game, Frostpunk 2 allows players to build a much larger city. Players can now construct districts instead of individual buildings. Each district serves a particular function, such as providing food, energy, or shelter. Specific buildings can be placed in each district to unlock additional functions. Each district, however, also costs players resources, and players need to plan the design of their cities before expanding.

As the city expands, the player will meet different factions, which often have conflicting ideals. Players can access the Idea Tree to investigate new research options. The Idea Tree allows players to explore different ideas proposed by the game's various factions to solve a problem. Adopting a faction's idea may upset other factions and communities. Unlike the first game, the citizens of New London are more involved in the policy-making process. At the Council Hall, 100 members of the community, each representing a certain faction, will cast votes on laws proposed by the player. Players can choose to negotiate with different council members, and they need to reach a certain threshold before a new law can be passed - simple 51-vote majorities for most laws and two-thirds for anything that may grant the Steward more power (such as the possibility of granting the Steward dictatorial authority, becoming the new Captain). Negotiation, however, requires players to make specific promises for the future, and not being able to uphold them may further upset a certain faction. Unlike the previous game, the gameplay is set on a timescale of weeks, rather than hours and days. As players progress in the game, radicals may grow within each faction, and players must work to counter their influence to avoid the city from descending into chaos.

In addition to the main story campaign, the game also features a sandbox mode named "Utopia Builder". It allows players to choose the starting communities and factions as well as the main objective, which is to build a huge metropolis, create large colonies around the city, or stockpile supplies in large quantities. Additional objectives can be added to increase difficulty such as preparing for a massive storm or dealing with the outbreak of a mysterious disease that provide extra bonuses if completed but lead to a "Game Over" if failed. The team added that the sandbox mode will have more replay value than the one found in the original game. An official mod tool, FrostKit, is available at launch.

== Plot ==
In 1886, New London survives the "Great Storm" that followed the collapse of the British Empire, prospering under the leadership of "the Captain". After 30 years of rule, the Captain is dying, New London is overcrowded, and the Generator—the coal-fired steam engine that has provided heat and power to the city—is running out of fuel. In the prologue mission, a band of wanderers settles in the remains of an oil-fired Dreadnought train and uses its furnace to make camp before a "Whiteout" storm. Afterward, they set out to find New London. By this time, the Captain has died, and his loyalists have named a new leader as Steward. The choices during the prologue determine the route that New London took in the first game's campaign, which then determines the beginning faction: either the Stalwarts (Order) or the Faithkeepers (Faith). In either case, both will favour defeating the frost by progressing technology.

The Steward's first task is to find an alternate source of fuel. Scout teams in the Frostlands find the old Dreadnought and its intact supplies of fuel, and New London begins to adapt the Generator either to use oil exclusively or a mix of oil, coal, and steam provided from external sources. Depending on which beginning faction was selected, a rival faction will form with completely opposing ideologies (Pilgrims if Stalwarts exist; Evolvers if Faithkeepers exist), choosing to adapt to the frost rather than rely solely on superior tech.

After New London survives its first "Whiteout" using its new fuel reserves, New London discovers the destroyed city of Winterhome, a famed and advanced settlement which fell just before the Great Storm. The Steward can choose to upgrade New London's generator to an unheard level with Steam Cores buried in Winterhome, but recovering the Cores would cause toxic gases to rise from fissures and make Winterhome permanently uninhabitable. Alternatively, the Steward can choose to intentionally cause an avalanche, sealing off the toxic gases but also the Steam Cores forever. Then, Winterhome can be resettled, creating a springboard for other colonies and fully embracing the frostland. In either case, one faction will have their dream of progress or adaptation realized, and the other faction will feel shunned.

Tensions between the factions in the city will rise, ultimately resulting in the murder of a council member and igniting a civil war between the two factions. The Steward must choose between negotiating a peace treaty, banishing one of the factions involved in the war, or gathering enough support from the council to become the new Captain with full authority over the city and create massive camps to segregate the warring factions. Regardless of the action chosen, the game ends once the player either resolves the conflict and stabilizes the city, or fails and the city collapses into anarchy. An Epilogue cutscene summarizes the effect your choices had in the city, as well as the life of Lily May, a child born when the Generator was re-ignited, who is a teenager by the time of the civil war.

=== Breach of Trust ===
In 1927, the citizens of New Edinburgh rebel against their tyrannical Captain, who commits suicide rather than be deposed. In the wake of the Captain's death, the city council creates the position of "First Citizen" to replace him. However, New Edinburgh suffers from various issues, such as their reliance on harvesting steam from geothermal vents making the ground seismically unstable which creates destructive tremors that damage the city. In addition, the colony of Aurora has taken the opportunity to declare independence from New Edinburgh, and has halted all food shipments which risks the city suffering a famine. The First Citizens' first task is to secure food from Aurora, either by peacefully negotiating a trade deal or raising an army to invade and occupy the colony.

If the First Citizen pursues peace negotiations, Aurora eventually allows New Edinburgh to control parts of the colony and can be convinced to cede more land. If the First Citizen declares war and conquers Aurora, the colony is occupied and the local populace forms a resistance movement that conducts guerilla warfare against New Edinburgh. Regardless of the choice, New Edinburgh is forced to transfer their Generator's thermal hull to Aurora's Generator in order to improve food production. The First Citizen then focuses on developing Aurora's infrastructure to ensure a steady supply of food can be supplied to New Edinburgh.

Unfortunately, once New Edinburgh has been supplied with enough food, the dormant volcano located near the city suddenly erupts, triggered by years of the Captain's reckless steam harvesting. The First Citizen's final task is organizing the evacuation of the entire population of New Edinburgh to Aurora, as well as dismantling and transporting the Generator to the colony. After the volcano's second eruption, the city is completely destroyed, killing anybody who was left behind.

In 1959, Aurora's fate depends on the First Citizen's actions, with the colony either becoming an occupied zone plagued with hate and distrust, or a flourishing city where the populace lives in harmony. In both endings, scouts discover fresh sprouts growing in the ruins of New Edinburgh.

== Development ==
Similar to the first game, Frostpunk 2 was developed by 11 Bit Studios. A team of about 70 people worked on the game's development and production. While the original game was about enduring and surviving an apocalypse, the sequel focused more on keeping a city prosperous, building for a better future, and adapting to a new set of challenges and circumstances. According to game director Jakub Stokalski, while extreme temperature and other natural hazards may still lead to a city's collapse, "social survival is even more important" and mismanaging the populace and not being able to satisfy the demands of various factions may lead to "tension and conflict". Stokalski added that "Frostpunk 2 is really about this observation that we can only come together so far to overcome the obstacles in front of us, and that ultimately the biggest enemy is always human nature". The team took inspirations from stories of towns and cities rebuilding following a period of hardships.

11 Bit Studios announced Frostpunk 2 in August 2021. Early previews of the game revealed the Utopia mode, a sandbox building mode, as the studio expected it to become the most requested feature by the community. The game was initially set to be released for Windows PC, PlayStation 5 and Xbox Series X and Series S on July 25, 2024. On March 18, 2024, the 11 bit studios team announced the release of a pre-release version of the game for owners of the Deluxe version, which includes the ability to install and run the game in sandbox mode before the main release date. Later that year, on June 27, the game developers announced that the launch date had been postponed to September 20, 2024, following the early access feedback, which led to new additions to the game mechanics.

On November 27, 2024. A roadmap for future updates was released including a "Free Major Content Update" in 2025, as well as three paid DLCs. The first DLC pack, titled "Fractured Utopias", was released in December 2025. It introduced eight new factions, a new map, as well as additional narrative events and unlocks. The second DLC pack, titled "Breach of Trust", is set to be released on June 23, 2026. The third pack, titled The Surge, is set to be released on December 14, 2026.

== Reception ==
Reception

Aggregate scores
Aggregator	Score
Metacritic	(PC) 85/100
OpenCritic	95% recommend

Review scores
Publication	Score
Digital Trends	4/5 stars
GameSpot	8/10
GamesRadar+	4.5/5 stars
Hardcore Gamer	4.5/5
IGN	8/10
PC Gamer (US)	85/100
PCGamesN	8/10
Shacknews	9/10
TechRadar	4.5/5 stars

Frostpunk 2 received "generally favorable" reviews from critics, according to review aggregator Metacritic, and 95% of critics recommended the game, according to OpenCritic.

=== Sales ===
By September 24, 2024 (four days after global launch on PC), the game had sold more than 350,000 copies and had already recouped its development and marketing costs. As of December 2024, the game had sold 592,000 copies and generated $18.5 million in revenue.

=== Awards and nominations ===
Frostpunk 2 was nominated and won in three categories at the Digital Dragons Awards, including Best Polish Game.

Accolades for Frostpunk 2
Year	Award	Category	Result	Ref.
2024	Gamescom Awards	Best Gameplay	Won	
2024	15th Hollywood Music in Media Awards	Original Score – Video Game (Console & PC)	Nominated	
2024	Golden Joystick Awards	PC Game of the Year	Nominated	
2024	The Game Awards 2024	Best Sim/Strategy Game	Won	
2024	The Steam Awards	Best Soundtrack	Nominated	
2025	28th Annual D.I.C.E. Awards	Strategy/Simulation Game of the Year	Nominated	
2025	28th Annual D.I.C.E. Awards	Outstanding Achievement in Audio Design	Nominated	
2025	Game Audio Network Guild Awards	Best Game Trailer Audio	Nominated	
2025	Game Audio Network Guild Awards	Best Main Theme	Nominated	
2025	Game Audio Network Guild Awards	Best Music for an Indie Game	Won	
2025	Game Audio Network Guild Awards	Best Original Soundtrack Album	Nominated	
2025	Game Audio Network Guild Awards	Music of the Year	Nominated	
2025	25th Game Developers Choice Awards	Best Narrative	Honorable mention	
2025	25th Game Developers Choice Awards	Social Impact	Nominated	

== See also ==
- The Ice Schooner, a book by Michael Moorcock with a similar post-apocalyptic new ice age setting
