= Kukulu =

2018 video game

- Developer: Qene Technology
- Publisher: Gebeya
- Director: Dawit Abraham
- Platforms: Android, iOS, Microsoft Windows
- Release: Android April 2018; iOS 18 October 2021
- Genre: Endless runner
- Mode: Single-player

Kukulu (Amharic: ኩኩሉ) is an endless runner video game developed by Ethiopian video game studio Qene Technology and published by Gebeya. Available on iOS and Android operating system, it was released in April 2018, and garnered over 3,000 downloads on the Google Play Store as of August 2018.

The player controls a chicken named Kukulu during running to avoid capture by her owner and his dog. Additional characters include a dove and crow that assist the player by dropping power-ups and Kukulu should manage to collect small seeds named "kolo" to accelerate energy.

== Gameplay ==
Kukulu is an endless runner game that involves the character of a chicken named "Kukulu" chased by an old man in a small village in Ethiopia. During the running, two guiding birds, "Ergeb" (dove) and "Qura" (crow) assisted her the way, dropping power-ups. These power-ups used for avoiding oncoming obstacles. Collecting the bright colored bean known as "kolo" gives energy to the character. There are also magical items throughout the game, which occasionally aid to gain power. Collision from any obstacles would result in capture by the old man along with his dog.

== Development and premise ==
Qene Technology was founded in January 2017 by CEO and lead game developer Dawit Abraham along with Samrawit Demeke and Henok Teklu. The initial objective of the company was to "create African themed fictional superheroes". In conversation with Dawit Abraham and Samrawit Demeke, they explained Africa is still "underrepresented in gaming industry", and the game's entire model is uniquely "African design" with provision of premium quality. The developers wanted to distribute the game with small scale market before they met with colleagues Amadou Daffe and Hiruye Amanuel, co-founders of Gebeya. According to Dawit, "Gebeya incubated Kukulu, and we were able to finance the production and many other cost of the game".

== Plot ==
The game opens with cutscene of newborn abandoned chicken hatching from egg. After her growth and bear children, she encounters an old man and his dog before her capture and thrown into the cage. Luckily, the chicken is escaped by two different birds from the house and give magical force that could open the cage to free the fowl.

An old man enters the house holding a knife to butcher the chicken, but the bird intimidatingly managed to escape the man, and chasing begins.

== Reception ==
In June 2018, Kukulu was awarded Best Media and Entertainment Award at the AppsAfrica.
