= TOTM =

TOTM can stand for:

- Theater of the Mind
- TOTM United States military ration
- Take Over the Moon, extended play by Chinese boy group WayV
- Tomb of the Mask, a 2016 video game
- Tomb of the Mutilated, a 1992 studio album by American death metal band Cannibal Corpse
