= Endless runner =

Video game genre

Tomb of the Mask, an endless runner, does not have a definitive end; the player needs to get as far as possible, trying to set a high score.

Endless runner (also infinite runner or auto run) is a subgenre of platform game in which the player character potentially runs for an infinite amount of time while avoiding obstacles. The player's objective is to reach a high score by surviving for as long as possible. The method by which the game level or environment appears to continuously spawn before the player is an example of procedural generation. The genre exploded on mobile platforms following the success of Temple Run, Canabalt, and Doodle Jump. Its popularity is attributed to its simple gameplay that works well on touchscreen devices.

== Concepts ==
Endless runners can be side-scrolling, as in the genre's early titles, top-down, or 3D, but the player is placed in a neverending level in which the character automatically moves forward. The player's only form of control is to have the character dodge obstacles, either by moving out of the way or using a specific button. Some form of points, currency, or other rewards are gained over time by maneuvering in the level or simply staying alive longer. The game progressively increases in difficulty as time goes on. Usually, the player has a game over if they are hindered enough by the obstacles that they are "caught" by whatever is chasing them and die; however, this is not always the case.

== History ==
=== Precursors ===
The genre has its origins in the vertically scrolling video games of the 1970s, primarily racing games. The player always moves forward, avoiding obstacles and other vehicles. Taito's Speed Race, released in 1974, was the first. In the late 1970s and early 1980s, the same concept was used in skiing games.

Vehicle-oriented platform games, like Jump Bug (1981) and Moon Patrol (1982), added both jumping and shooting as ways to deal with obstacles in continually scrolling levels. River Raid (1982) has no end; the aircraft flies upward on a procedurally generated setting. The home game B.C.'s Quest for Tires (1983) uses the forced-scrolling and jumping gameplay of Moon Patrol.

The idea of being chased relentlessly by an indestructible obstacle, monster, or boss to enforce forward progression was greatly influenced by the boulder scene from the 1981 film Raiders of the Lost Ark. This theme appeared in games like Draconian (1984) in which the player must avoid obstacles while being pursued by an invincible giant dragon. This would become a recurring theme of endless running gameplay.

=== Early development ===
177 (1986), a controversial adult game for the PC-88, has endless running from a 2D side-scrolling perspective. The 3-D Battles of WorldRunner (1987), a Squaresoft rail shooter for the Nintendo Entertainment System, has endless running from a pseudo-3D third‑person perspective. Atomic Runner Chelnov (1988), an arcade run-and-gun shooter, has several hallmarks of a modern runner with forced scrolling and long jumping onto platforms to avoid hazards. The 1990 Amiga and TV show game Hugo has sequences of pseudo-3D endless running. In Genji Tsuushin Agedama (1991), the player is constantly running in a forced scrolling environment.

Battletoads (1991) has several forced scrolling areas where the player is required to avoid hazards and obstacles. SkiFree (1991) by Chris Pirih and released in Microsoft Entertainment Pack 3 was inspired by the 1980 Atari 2600 cartridge Skiing. The player skis down an endless slope with procedurally generated obstacles, pursued by large indestructible yetis. Score is based on distance traveled. The pinball machine Doctor Who (1992) includes a video mode with forced running and avoiding obstacles.

The special bonus stages in Sonic the Hedgehog 2 (1992) and Sonic the Hedgehog 3 (1994) for the Sega Mega Drive were early examples of endless runner gameplay from a pseudo-3D third-person perspective. The first two stages of Disney's Aladdin (1994) for the Master System and Game Gear featured endless runner gameplay from a 2D side-scrolling perspective. SFCave (1996) is a Windows 3.1 game that involves flying through an endless cave without hitting the walls.

Pepsiman (1999) for the PlayStation is a 3D endless runner predating the mobile trend. The player character, Pepsiman, automatically runs forward through levels and must avoid obstacles along the way.

=== Mobile gaming boom and emergence of genre ===
The emergence of the touchscreen on smart phones and tablets paved the way for the type of simplistic game controls which gave birth to the modern genre.

Doodle Jump (April 2009), a vertical scroller, was one of the first mobile titles to be endless, with game only ending when falling to the bottom of the screen or hitting an obstacle. It was to pave the way for even more popular titles.

The prototypical endless runner, building on Doodle Jump's success, was Canabalt (a common misconception is that Canabalt was the first modern endless runner, but Ovenbreak was added to the App Store in June 2009, two months prior to the release of Canabalt in August 2009), an indie game developed by Adam Saltsman in which the player flees from a city being destroyed by giant robots that is procedurally generated and infinite. Cannabalt used distance gained as the main scoring system. These were both common elements of subsequent runners. The 2D scroller limited movement to leaping and dodging obstacles simply by touching the screen, overcoming control limitation of touchscreen devices. Adult Swim Games soon asked Saltsman for permission to adapt Canabalt's design into their own title, and released Robot Unicorn Attack (2010). It became an internet meme due to Adult Swim's larger audience and its quirky themes.

Within just months, the App Store was full of 2D endless runner clones. Some of the more popular 2D mobile titles included Tiny Wings (February 2011), Jetpack Joyride (September 2011), Punch Quest (2012) and Flappy Bird (2013). Running with Friends (2013) is notable in its effort to integrate with Facebook to support social multiplayer running.

=== Monetization and free-to-play model ===
Endless runners became known for the addictiveness of their gameplay. This also led to them being monetized using the Free to Play model. Monetization tactics used in endless runners included virtual currencies (using In app purchases on mobile and support for:

1. Fast-track progress (so as to avoid having to repeat early stages of the game)
2. Credit to extend the run (such as with extra lives) and avoid game over (however this is often considered cheating)
3. Customisation or unlocking of new main characters
4. Social score comparison
5. Advertising

=== Transition to 3D ===
Hugo featured 3D endless running already in 1990.

Bit.Trip Runner (2010) added rhythm game elements and was also one of the first in the genre to be rendered in 2.5D.

The first 3d endless runner game on mobile was Falling Fred, releasing on February 23, 2011. Another of the earliest 3D titles in the genre was Temple Run (August, 2011), introducing an over-the-shoulder viewpoint. Temple Run was followed by numerous clones and 3D innovations. Among the more popular third person 3D titles were Subway Surfers and Agent Dash (both 2012). Subway Surfers went on to become one of the most successful mobile games of the decade. In March 2018, it became the first game to surpass one billion downloads on the Google Play Store. By March 2023, it had reached over four billion downloads across platforms and was the most downloaded mobile game of 2022. According to Business of Apps, the game has generated well over $165 million in revenue through in‑app purchases and advertising.

=== Peak popularity ===
During the 2010s, numerous large franchises adapted their gameplay into endless runner mobile spin-offs. These included reboots of classic video games as endless runners including the notable titles: Pitfall! (2012), Rayman Jungle Run (2012), Rayman Fiesta Run, Sonic Dash and Pac-Man Dash! (2013), Crossy Road (2014), Lara Croft: Relic Run and Pac-Man 256 (2015). Original titles were often lost in the sea of generic titles, rare exceptions were Geometry Dash (2013), Race The Sun (2013) and Alto's Adventure (2015) which received positive reviews.

Google's Dinosaur Game (2014) was released at the height of the endless running craze with developers in September 2018 revealling that it was being played approximately 270 million times monthly. Microsoft was later to do the same with Surf (2020).

Post 2010s the format has been criticised for being uninspired, particularly the adapted franchises, and a genre lacking ongoing innovation.
