= Crossy Road =

2014 video game

- App icon
- Developers: Hipster Whale yodo1
- Publishers: Hipster Whale yodo1 (pre-June 2017)
- Engine: Unity
- Platforms: iOS, iPadOS, macOS, tvOS, Microsoft Windows, Android, Android TV, Windows Phone, Series 30+, Sky Q, KaiOS
- Release: iOS: WW: 20 November 2014; Android: WW: 23 December 2014; Windows Phone: WW: 1 May 2015; tvOS: WW: 30 October 2015; Nokia 105 (2017) KaiOS: WW: 2019
- Genre: Endless runner
- Modes: Single-player, multiplayer (tvOS)

Crossy Road is an action game released on 20 November 2014. It was developed and published for iOS by Australian video game developer Hipster Whale and originally yodo1 for Android. The name and concept of the game play on the riddle joke "Why did the chicken cross the road?" It has been described as endless runner version of the 1981 video game Frogger. After June 2017, the publisher for the Android version of Crossy Road was changed from yodo1 to Hipster Whale.

== Gameplay and objectives ==
The objective of Crossy Road is to move the character through an endless path of static and moving obstacles as far as possible without hitting any hazards. By default, the character is a chicken that must cross a series of busy roads, rivers and active train tracks, but there are hundreds of other characters, and depending on the character the environment around also changes, with the obstacles varying. For example, when playing as the Astronaut, the environment is space and obstacles include asteroids.

In the original mobile version, the player must hop to go forward or swipe the screen in the appropriate direction to move the character horizontally or backwards. Some characters can only be unlocked with cash or in-game currency.

There are a number of special characters in addition to regular characters. For example, the Android version includes Android Robot, based on the operating system's Android logo. Other characters include Doge, Archie, Dark Lord, the mascot of Hipster Whale and #thedress, a female character wearing the dress of the same name. Various popular culture references and games are also included, such as Forget-Me-Not and "Emo Goose" voiced by Phil Lester.

The player is able to collect coins, an in-game currency: they are golden-yellow and squarish, with a red C in the middle. These are obtained in-game by collection during gameplay, watching advertisements, completing tasks, collecting a free gift given every few real-time hours, and using legal currency to buy them in various amounts. Coins are counted the top right corner of the screen. One hundred coins can be used for a chance at a new character from a lottery machine. If the player owns the Piggy Bank mascot, red coins worth five coins each are added to the game, and coins received from free gifts or watching ads are doubled.

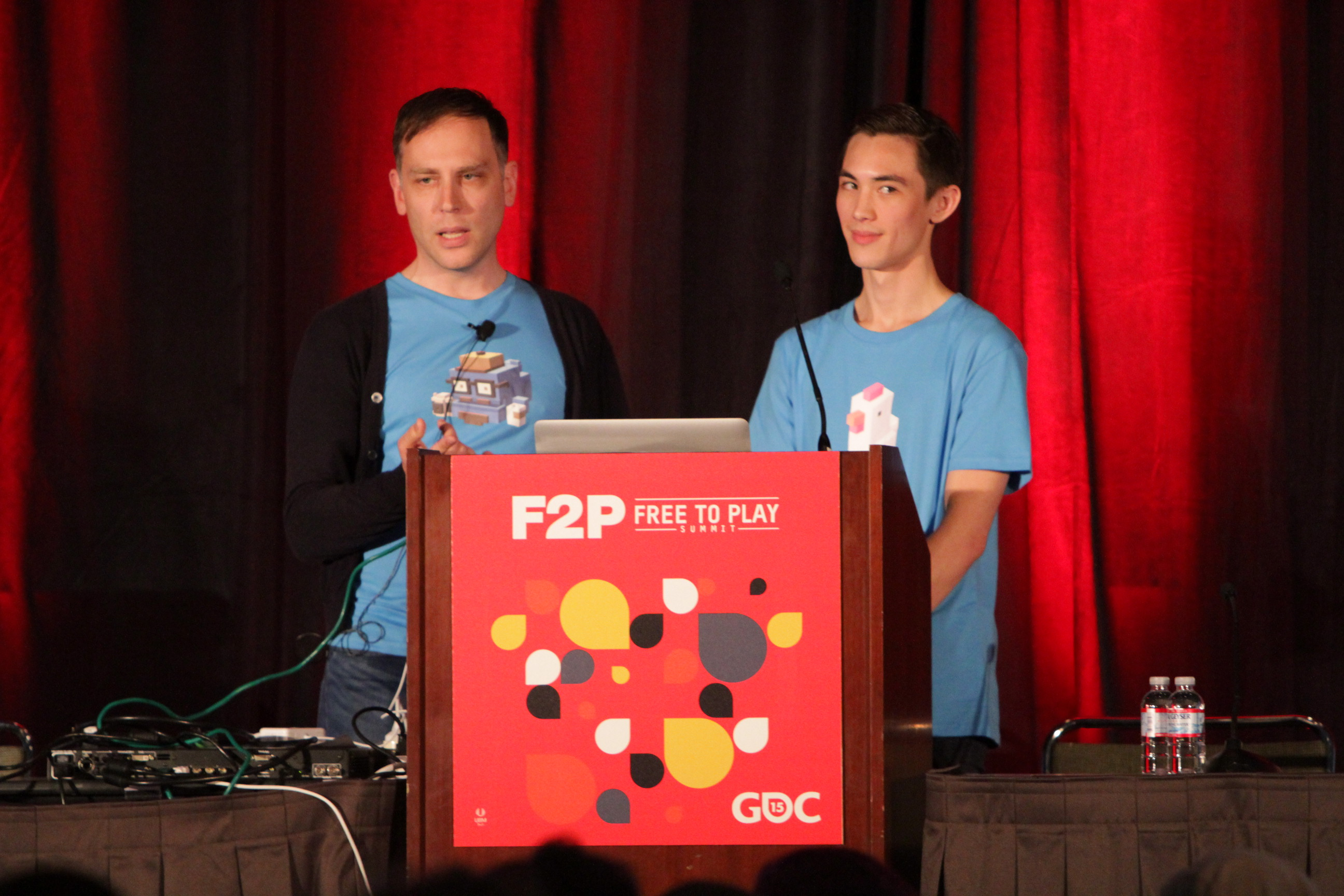
Hipster Whale founders and game developers Matt Hall and Andy Sum at Game Developers Conference

== Development ==
Initially the developers planned to spend only six weeks developing the game, but afterwards realized the game's potential and dedicated another six weeks to completing it. The game's free-to-play model was based on the one for Dota 2.

A big influence on the team was the success of the game Flappy Bird. Developer Matt Hall noted that "That was when people really wanted to play high-score chasing games, and they were telling people about it, and there was this cool opportunity." Eventually Hall hit upon combining such a game with Frogger. Other influences included Temple Run, Subway Surfers, Disco Zoo, Skylanders, Tiny Wings and Fez. The game's art style was created by Ben Weatherall.

== Reception ==
The game received generally positive reviews with Metacritic giving the game a score of 88, TouchArcade giving the game 5/5 stars, BigBoomBoom.com giving the game 5/5 stars, Gamezebo Gaming giving the game 4.5/5 stars, and Apple N' Apps giving the game a 4/5 overall score. Polygon dubbed the game "brilliant" and compared it as an updated take on Frogger, while Time called the game a mix of Frogger and Flappy Bird.

Crossy Road was a finalist for the Game of the Year Award at the Australian Game Developer Awards 2014. At the 2015 Apple WWDC developer's conference, it was one of the winners of the Apple Design Awards. In 2025, it was nominated for Excellence in Ongoing at the Australian Game Developer Awards.

Flat Eric, best known for his appearances in Levi's commercials in 1999, as well as the music video for Flat Beat is an unlockable character.

=== Sales ===
Three months after its initial release, the game earned over $10 million and had over 50 million downloads. The game found unexpected success in South Korea upon release, with the developers saying at a panel that it sat at the #1 spot of the Korean Google Play Store for 50 days after BTS played the game and was tweeting about it to their fans.

== Spin-offs ==
=== Disney Crossy Road ===
In 2016, Hipster Whale and Disney Interactive Studios launched a spin-off video game called Disney Crossy Road on iOS, Android, Windows Phone, Windows 8.1, (Note: Windows version was discontinued after version 2.8.) and Windows 10 devices. It features Disney characters like Mickey Mouse and Donald Duck, as well as some characters from numerous Disney franchises such as The Jungle Book, The Nightmare Before Christmas, Monsters Inc., Zootopia, Big Hero 6, The Lion King, Tangled, Wreck-It Ralph, Moana, Toy Story, Cars, DuckTales, The Incredibles and Inside Out. At launch, the game featured over 100 characters.

Disney Crossy Road was shut down on iOS, Google, and Amazon on 12 March 2020.

=== Crossy Road Castle ===
Crossy Road Castle is an endless co-op platformer that acts as a sequel to Crossy Road, initially available only on Apple Arcade from 2020, but ported to other consoles in 2024. It supports up to four players and can be played with either touch controls or a controller. Players are placed in a procedurally generated tower spanning multiple levels and must work together to get a high score.

=== CroZXy Road ===
With the permission of Hipster Whale, Bob Smith re-wrote Crossy Road for the ZX81, an 8-bit computer from the 1980s. In Smith's words, one of the motivations for porting the game "is to prove that there are some great modern game ideas which don't rely on amazing graphics or great processing power, and could work just as well on much older machines." The ZX81 version was released in 2015.

== See also ==
- Pac-Man 256
- Freeway
- Retro gaming
