= Hipster Whale =

Australian video game developer

Hipster Whale Pty Ltd
- Logo as of 2025
- Type: Subsidiary
- Industry: Video games
- Founded: 20 November 2014; 11 years ago
- Founders: Andy Sum; Matt Hall
- Headquarters: The Arcade, Melbourne, Australia
- Area served: Worldwide
- Key people: Andy Sum; Matt Hall; Clara Reeves (CEO)
- Products: Crossy Road; Pac-Man 256; Disney Crossy Road
- Services: Video game development; Video game publishing
- Parent: Atari (2026–present)
- Website: hipsterwhale.com

Hipster Whale is an Australian video game developer and publisher based in Melbourne, Australia, a subsidiary of Atari SA. Founded on 20 November 2014 by Andy Sum and Matt Hall, Hipster Whale was formed before the making of the game Crossy Road, which released to success.

The company has also created the games Pac-Man 256 (in collaboration with Bandai Namco Entertainment) and Disney Crossy Road (in collaboration with Disney Interactive Studios).

== History ==
After meeting at GCAP (Game Center: Asia Pacific) 2013, Andy Sum and Matt Hall decided to make Hipster Whale. The name came from discussing free-to-play games and the word "whale" came up in the conversation. Sum was doodling as they were talking and began drawing a whale, which would later become the company's logo. Sum and Hall kept the whale as the mascot for later on.

Hipster Whale's first game, Crossy Road was planned to take a total of six weeks to develop, but after seeing its potential, the developers spent more than 12 weeks on it. Crossy Road was inspired by linear movement games (modern successors to classic platform games) such as Temple Run and Flappy Bird. The name and concept of the game is based on the joke "Why did the chicken cross the road?".

On 22 May 2015, Bandai Namco Entertainment and Hipster Whale announced Pac-Man 256, which featured Pac-Man trying to escape ghosts and overcome a glitch while performing the same mechanics as the 1980 video game, with the glitch based on the Level 256 glitch from the original arcade game, but with upgrades and freemium purchases. On 20 August, the game was released, with the game then being released on Microsoft Windows, PlayStation 4 and Xbox One on 22 June 2016.

In March 2016, Hipster Whale announced a spin-off of Crossy Road, Disney Crossy Road, which would be published by Disney Interactive Studios. On 20 July, the company announced its move into video game publishing, and appointed former Atari and Krome Studios Melbourne employee Clara Reeves as the president of Hipster Whale; she had recently worked at Film Victoria. On 7 September, the company released an update towards Disney Crossy Road, which added Monsters, Inc. characters to the game and a mode called the "Weekend Challenge".

In June 2026, Hipster Whale was fully acquired by Atari SA for $39.3 million as part of the company's effort to expand its mobile business.

== Products ==
Year	Title	Genre	Platform	Note(s)
2014	Crossy Road	Endless arcade mobile game	iOS, tvOS, Android, Windows Phone	Published originally on Android by Yodo1 from 2015 to 2017.
2015	Pac-Man 256	Endless arcade mobile game	iOS, Android, Microsoft Windows, PlayStation 4, Xbox One, OS X, Linux, Apple TV, Android TV	Co-developed with 3 Sprockets. Published by Bandai Namco Entertainment Europe.
2016	Disney Crossy Road (Discontinued)	Endless arcade mobile game	iOS, Android, Windows Phone	Published by Disney Interactive
2018	Piffle	Endless arcade mobile game	iOS, Android, Nintendo Switch	Developed with Mighty Games.
2020	Crossy Road Castle	Endless arcade mobile game	iOS, PlayStation 5, Xbox Series X, Xbox Series S, Nintendo Switch	
2021	Downhill Smash	Arcade	iOS, Android	Developed and published by ZeptoLab.
2024	Pac-Man 256+	Endless arcade mobile game	iOS, Apple TV	
2026	Crossy Road Rush (upcoming)	Endless arcade mobile game	Apple Arcade	
