= Death Howl =

2025 video game

- Developer: The Outer Zone
- Publisher: 11 Bit Studios
- Platforms: Windows; Nintendo Switch; PlayStation 5; Xbox Series X/S
- Release: Windows; December 9, 2025; Switch, PS5, Xbox Series X/S; February 19, 2026
- Genres: Turn-based strategy, soulslike
- Mode: Single-player

Death Howl is a turn-based strategy video game developed by The Outer Zone and published by 11 Bit Studios, released on December 9, 2025 on Windows. The game launched on Nintendo Switch, PlayStation 5 and Xbox Series X/S on February 19, 2026. Developer The Outer Zone is based in Copenhagen, Denmark.

== Gameplay ==
The player explores areas of the spirit world, battling with its inhabitants in a turn-based battle, using various cards from their deck. Each used card as well as each move on the tile field costs energy points; new cards can be crafted from resources left from a defeated enemy.

The player can travel around the map, divided into distinct regions, interacting with different NPCs. Each of four spiritual realms is built around a different mechanic, like discarding or taking damage or receiving vital boosts by repeating a realm's favored action over time. The player can also take sidequests by encountering spirits and fulfilling their will, which give various items or resources.

== Plot ==
The game is set in Mesolithic Scandinavia in 6000 BC. The protagonist named Ro journeys into the spirit world seeking for Death after her son dies. In her quest to get him back, she seeks help from the land's four great spirits to reach the summit of the howling mountain. Along the way, she encounters a variety of surreal spirits, most of which she has to defeat in combat.

== Reception ==
Reception

Aggregate scores
Aggregator	Score
Metacritic	82/100
OpenCritic	85% recommend

Review scores
Publication	Score
Destructoid	9/10
Game Informer	8.75/10
PC Gamer (US)	81/100
PCMag	4.5/5

Death Howl received generally favorable reviews from critics, according to the review aggregation website Metacritic. Fellow review aggregator OpenCritic assessed that the game received strong approval, being recommended by 85% of critics.

Reviewing the game for Destructoid, Rachel Samples lauded Death Howl as "a harrowing, punishing, and visually striking game about grief and survival" as well as "a fantastic representation of both the deckbuilding and soulslike genres". Samples further praised the art style, exploration, storytelling, and balanced gameplay difficulty while offering some criticism toward the sometimes "wonky" controller support. In his review for PCMag, Vincent Peter praised the "grief-stricken vibes and breathtaking gorgeous visuals", writing, story, and core gameplay loop while criticizing the lack of accessibility options.

The game has been described as "refreshing" and "well-crafted" compared to other soulslike games. Some reviewers noted the harshness of battle system, that "throws you into the spirit world, hands you five basic cards, and says "good luck"". The game's emotionality, unique art style and deep story were also often highlighted.
