= Moonlighter 2: The Endless Vault =

- Developer: Digital Sun
- Publisher: 11 Bit Studios
- Designers: Victor Ribera; Luis Pérez
- Artist: Irene Alfaro
- Composer: Christopher Larkin
- Engine: Unity
- Platforms: Windows; PlayStation 5; Xbox Series X/S; Nintendo Switch 2
- Release: November 19, 2025 (early access); September 2, 2026 (full release)
- Genres: Action role-playing, roguelike
- Mode: Single-player

Moonlighter 2: The Endless Vault is an action role-playing roguelike video game developed by Digital Sun and published by 11 Bit Studios. As a sequel to Moonlighter (2018), it is planned to be released for Windows, PlayStation 5, Xbox Series X and Series S, and Nintendo Switch 2. It was launched as an early access game in November 2025, and was released in full in September 2026.

== Gameplay ==
Unlike the first game, Moonlighter 2: The Endless Vault is a 3D game viewed from an isometric perspective.

The game is an action role-playing game in which the player takes control of Will, a shopkeeper by day and a dungeon explorer by night. Unlike its predecessor, which is a 2D title played from a top-down perspective, Moonlighter 2 is a fully 3D game viewed from an isometric angle.

In the game, the player ventures into diverse biomes in search of ancient relics while battling enemies with an arsenal of weapons. Each relic discovered in different biomes grants unique combat bonuses and modifiers. Players also need to actively manage Will's backpack, as certain relics will synergize with each other, triggering additional effects. Upon returning to the village, players can sell these relics at Will’s shop. The earnings can then be spent on potions, new weapons, and armor to further enhance his combat prowess. The shop can be further customized with decor and display stands which further increase the value of each relic. To sell a relic, Will must first set its price, check buyer's reaction, and adjust it accordingly. As players progress, new merchants will set up their shops in the village, unlocking new customization options and upgrades.

== Story ==
Following the events of the original game, Will and the townspeople of Rynoka are suddenly banished by an interdimensional entity known as Moloch to a remote, unfamiliar village called Tresna. Will reopens his Moonlighter shop and resumes his treasure hunting activities to collect goods to sell at his new shop when a mysterious object appears in the village called "The Endless Vault".

The vault instructs Will to keep selling goods at his shop in order to unlock its rewards, hoping that by doing so, the Rynokans will reclaim their homeland. Moloch discovers the vault's location and sends Will and his friends back to Rynoka in exchange for the vault's possession. Finding the town destroyed and deserted, Will and the others realize that they have found a new home in Tresna with their new friends and return there. Moloch attempts to open the vault by force but Will stops him. Moloch attacks Will but is thrown into the vault instead and locked inside. The vault then rewards Will with one last gift, a seed of a Rynokan tree that they plant in Tresna as a sign of having finally accepted their new home.

== Development ==
Moonlighter 2 is currently being developed by Spanish studio Digital Sun. Since Moonlighter was the studio's debut game, the team wanted to explore ways to expand on that foundation with new features, deeper gameplay, and overhauled combat. The team's experience working on The Mageseeker helped the team create combat systems that are more complex, while their work on Cataclismo paved the foundation for the game's transition from 2D to 3D using the Unity engine. Its design was heavily inspired by Hades, with the team describing the game as a "shopkeeping roguelike. The team also compared the game to The Legend of Zelda: The Wind Waker and Risk of Rain 2.

Digital Sun and 11 Bit Studios announced the game in December 2024. While the team initially aimed to launch the game as an early access title on October 23, 2025, it was delayed to November 19 as the original release window were crowded by the release of multiple high-profile games. The early access version was launched with three biomes, 120 relics, and four weapons. The 1.0 release for the game was released on September 2, 2026.

== Reception ==
Reception

Aggregate scores
Aggregator	Score
Metacritic	(PC) 72/100 (PS5) 77/100 (NS2) 79/100
OpenCritic	83% recommend (Note: Based on 46 reviews)

Review score
Publication	Score
Nintendo Life	8/10

According to the review aggregation website Metacritic, the PlayStation 5, and Nintendo Switch 2 versions of the game received generally favorable reviews from critics, while the PC version received "mixed or average" reviews. Fellow review aggregator OpenCritic assessed that the game received strong approval, being recommended by 83% of critics.

Jay Castello from Rock, Paper, Shotgun wrote that the game was a significant improvements over the first game, praising its new additions as well as the quality-of-life changes introduced. Writing for Nintendo Life, Ken Talbot described the game as a "a strong sequel that preserves the spirit of the original, while making some bold leaps from the mechanics established so well in that first outing". He praised its narrative, visuals, and updates to combat and inventory management, noting that the art style was "a natural progression from the pixel art of the first game" and comparing it to Bastion.
