= Moonlighter (video game) =

2018 video game

- International cover art
- Developer: Digital Sun
- Publishers: 11 bit studios; Netflix Games (Android, iOS)
- Composers: David Fenn; Pablo Caballero
- Engine: Unity
- Platforms: Linux; macOS; PlayStation 4; Windows; Xbox One; Nintendo Switch; iOS; Stadia; Android
- Release: May 29, 2018: Linux, macOS, PlayStation 4, Windows, Xbox One; WW: May 29, 2018; Nintendo Switch; WW: November 5, 2018; iOS; WW: November 19, 2020; Stadia; WW: July 1, 2021; Android; CAN: September 12, 2021; WW: May 24, 2022
- Genre: Action role-playing
- Mode: Single-player

Moonlighter is a 2018 action role-playing video game developed by Spanish indie studio Digital Sun and released for Linux, macOS, PlayStation 4, Windows, and Xbox One on May 29, 2018. A Nintendo Switch version was released on November 5, 2018. The game was made available for iOS and Android in November 2020 and September 2021, but were subsequently delisted. The mobile version was re-released for iOS and Android on May 24, 2022, via Netflix Games. A Stadia version developed by 11-bit studios in partnership with Crunching Koalas was released on July 1, 2021. A DLC expansion, subtitled Between Dimensions, was released on July 23, 2019.

A sequel, titled Moonlighter 2: The Endless Vault, was released into early access in November 2025.

== Plot ==
=== Setting ===
Moonlighter is set in the village of Rynoka, which was created when several mysterious doors were found to lead to unique places filled with artifacts. The people have started calling these places Dungeons and started venturing into them to gather resources to sell. There are 2 types of people who explore these dungeons, heroes who explore the dungeons and kill monsters for fame and glory, and merchants, people who explore the dungeons in search for artifacts within chests to sell. Heroes are held in greater esteem than merchants, as merchants are seen as people who only care about money.

Each dungeon contains a mini boss at each floor, along with a dungeon guardian at the final level. When the dungeons were first discovered, Rynoka was filled with travelers and warriors looking to explore these places, and the town was very prosperous in the beginning. However, as the casualty rate within the dungeons became too high, the town started closing down the dungeons in order to protect the citizens. This would lead to Rynoka´s decline, because it relied on the artifacts collected from the dungeons. As of now, only 1 dungeon remains open for people to explore.

=== Story ===
Will, a 17-year-old orphan, began exploring the dungeons near his house in order to collect artifacts to sell at his family shop, the Moonlighter. While exploring the first dungeon, he discovered a body which contained a note from Crazy Pete, a friend of his grandfather who used to research the dungeons. The note stated that each of the 4 dungeons contained a guardian, which had a key on them. These keys were needed to open the 5th dungeon, which had remained closed since the dungeons were discovered. However, Will was advised against trying to find these keys as he was a merchant, not a hero. Despite the warnings, Will managed to defeat each of the 4 dungeon guardians and collected the keys they had on them. He eventually became known as the hero-merchant and more travelers started visiting Rynoka again. After collecting all 4 keys, the door to the 5th dungeon finally opened.

As Will started to explore the 5th dungeon, he discovered it was filled with bodies of an alien species, and found some notes within the dungeon. The 5th dungeon was actually the base of a group of interdimensional pirates. These pirates were able to achieve interdimensional travel faster than any other civilization, and had started raiding other dimensions for their resources. The other dungeons were actually doorways to other dimensions the pirates created to streamline looting resources from other dimensions. When they discovered that a governmental group called the ICT was closing in on them, they decided to hide within their base to mask their base signal, giving the keys to a minion. The minion was to open the base within 1 month to resume their raiding. However, the minion was discovered and attacked by Crazy Pete, killing both the minion and Crazy Pete, causing the pirates to remain trapped. This led to the pirates fighting over what little resources they had. They decided to crash their base into a random dimension in a bid to try to escape, resulting in the dungeon's appearance. However, only 1 member of the pirates remained as a result: the captain.

When Will discovered the pirate captain, the pirate captain thanked Will for freeing him and offered him the chance to leave, after stating his desire to continue his plans of pillaging other dimensions. However, Will refused and fought the pirate captain, eventually defeating him. Outside the dungeons, several soldiers from the ICT had begun to arrive at the dungeons and closed them off. Opening the 5th dungeon had reactivated the base signal, allowing them to home in and attempt to capture the pirates. When Will exited the dungeon, he explained to the ICT captain what had happened to the pirates. The ICT captain then informed Will that he was supposed to arrest everyone on the planet for using the doors to raid other dimensions, but because of Will's actions in stopping the pirates and their contact with other dimension cultures, they decided to invite the planet to take part in the Dimensional Commerce Treaty, which allowed them to legally trade with other dimensions. They would shut down the dungeons and the continued use of them would be illegal. Afterwards, Will returned to Rynoka to inform the town about the news.

== Gameplay ==
Moonlighter has the player manage their shop during the day and go exploring at night. Shop keeping involves managing goods and receiving money, which the player can invest to upgrade the town and add services like a potion-maker and a blacksmith. These town upgrades allow the player to craft weapons, armor, and health potions, hire a part-time worker to sell things during the day, as well as upgrade the characters' equipment. At night, the player can explore dungeons and confront hordes of enemies, which drop loot upon defeat; loot can also be found in chests once the player clears a room. The game is divided by four different dungeons, the Golem, Forest, Desert, and Tech dungeons.

== Reception ==
Reception

Aggregate score
Aggregator	Score
OpenCritic	78% recommend (Note: Based on 111 reviews)

On Metacritic, Moonlighter received mixed reviews on PC platforms and positive reviews on the others. It was nominated for "Fan Favorite Indie Game" and "Fan Favorite Role Playing Game" at the Gamers' Choice Awards, and for "Most Fulfilling Community-Funded Game" at the SXSW Gaming Awards.
