= Outfolded =

2016 video game

- App icon
- Developer: 3 Sprockets
- Publisher: 3 Sprockets
- Composer: Christopher Larkin
- Platforms: iOS, Android
- Release: August 17, 2016
- Mode: Single-player

Outfolded is a 2016 puzzle video game developed and published by the Australian studio 3 Sprockets. It was released for iOS on August 17, 2016. The goal of the game is to unfold various three-dimensional shapes so that after all the shapes have been used, at least one of the shape's sides lands on the goal square.

== Gameplay ==
The player is given three 3D shapes that will need to trace a path from the starting square to the goal square. The player then taps and drags one of the shapes from a ribbon on the left side of the screen to put it into play. Then, the player swipes in the direction they want the shape to unfold. When a shape runs out of sides, there will be a flashing square which is where the next shape can be played and this repeats until the player reaches the goal point. The shapes must stay in contact with the game board (if there are no possible ways a shape's planes can be unfolded while maintaining contact with the board they will disappear) and all shapes must be used. To complete a level, one of the unfolded squares must land on the goal square.

Once a level is completed (by reaching the goal square), the player seamlessly goes to the next level which starts at the end of the previous level.

If the player makes a mistake, the player can tap the undo button to go back one move and long press the undo button to start a level over. The player is given a chance to undo unlimited times.

== Reception ==
Outfolded received mostly positive reviews. Gamezebo gave the game 4 out of 5 stars, praising the mechanic of the game feeling "fresh" and the colors, sounds, and effects as "enduring and relaxing" while criticizing the precision required to swipe to flip a shape. ApplenApps gave the game a rating of 4.0 out of 5 praising the seamless levels, a "compelling mechanic" and a "well thought out design" while criticizing the fact that the "levels can blend in a little bit" and there "could be more variation".

== See also ==
- Pac-Man 256, a game co-produced by 3 Sprockets
