= Punch Quest =

2012 video game

- Icon
- Developer: Madgarden
- Publishers: Rocketcat Games (iOS); Noodlecake Studios (Android)
- Platforms: iOS, Android
- Release: iOS; October 25, 2012; Android; May 2, 2013
- Genres: Beat-em-up, endless runner
- Mode: Single-player

Punch Quest is a 2012 beat 'em up game developed by the Canadian studio Madgarden and published by Rocketcat Games for iOS and Noodlecake Studios for Android.

== Gameplay ==
The game is an endless runner, with the goal of punching through as many monsters as possible, collecting punchos (the game's currency) along the way. The character is controlled by tapping either side of the screen. Hitting the left side of the screen uppercuts and slams opponents downward, while hitting the right performs a forward-dashing jab. As the game progresses, the player builds a meter of three special attacks, purchasable with the punchos you earn each level. Each special attack is unique, and can be swapped out for others in the customization menu along with other outfit customization options, which are also purchasable.

== Reception ==
Reception

Aggregate score
Aggregator	Score
Metacritic	93/100

Review scores
Publication	Score
Destructoid	7.5/10
Edge	8/10
Gamezebo	5/5
Hyper	9/10
IGN	9.3/10
MacLife	4/5
Pocket Gamer	4.5/5
TouchArcade	5/5
Digital Spy	4/5

The game received "universal acclaim" according to the review aggregation website Metacritic. Multiple critics gave the game a positive review.
