= 11 Bit Studios =

Polish video game company

11 bit studios Spółka Akcyjna
- Type: Public
- Traded as: WSE: 11B
- Industry: Video games
- Founded: 11 September 2010; 16 years ago
- Headquarters: Warsaw, Poland
- Key people: Przemysław Marszał
- Products: Frostpunk; Frostpunk 2; The Alters; This War of Mine
- Number of employees: 299 (2025)
- Website: www.11bitstudios.com

11 bit studios S.A. is a Polish video game developer and publisher based in Warsaw. The studio was founded in September 2010 by former members of CD Projekt and Metropolis Software. The studio is most known for developing Anomaly: Warzone Earth (2011), This War of Mine (2014), Frostpunk (2018), Frostpunk 2 (2024) and The Alters (2025).

== History ==
The company was officially formed on 11 September 2010, founded by CD Projekt and Metropolis Software developers and staff members. Currently, they employ approximately 299 people. The company's goal is to create games suitable for both hardcore gamers as well as casual gamers. They are well known for developing Anomaly: Warzone Earth, a real-time strategy reverse tower defense game, and This War of Mine, which was often praised by critics for its depiction of civilians in a city under siege similar to the siege of Sarajevo.

The studio's 2018 release, Frostpunk, sold over 250,000 copies in its first three days. Frostpunk depicts a dystopian Victorian England that has been overtaken by the frost, and the player is tasked with managing humanity's last city. In 2020, it was revealed that the company was investing $21 million to fund the development of three projects and four games signed to its publishing labels. One of them, Frostpunk 2, was announced on 12 August 2021 and released on 20 September 2024.

== Games ==
=== Developed ===
Year	Title	Platform(s)
2011	Anomaly: Warzone Earth	Android, iOS, Linux, OS X, Microsoft Windows, PlayStation 3, Xbox 360
2012	Anomaly: Korea	Android, iOS, Linux, OS X, Microsoft Windows
2012	Funky Smugglers	Android, iOS
2012	Sleepwalker's Journey	Android, iOS
2013	Anomaly 2	Android, iOS, Linux, OS X, Microsoft Windows, PlayStation 4
2014	Anomaly Defenders	Android, iOS, Linux, OS X, Microsoft Windows
2014	This War of Mine	Android, iOS, Linux, OS X, Microsoft Windows, PlayStation 4, Xbox One, Nintendo Switch, PlayStation 5, Xbox Series X/S
2018	Frostpunk	Microsoft Windows, OS X, PlayStation 4, Xbox One
2024	Frostpunk 2	macOS, Microsoft Windows, PlayStation 5, Xbox Series X/S
2025	The Alters	Microsoft Windows, PlayStation 5, Xbox Series X/S
2027	Frostpunk: 1886	Microsoft Windows

=== Published ===
Year	Title	Developer	Platform(s)
2014	Spacecom	Flow Combine	Android, Linux, OS X, Microsoft Windows
2017	Beat Cop	Pixel Crow	Android, Linux, OS X, Microsoft Windows, Nintendo Switch
2017	Tower 57	Pixwerk	Linux, OS X, Microsoft Windows
2018	Moonlighter	Digital Sun	Linux, OS X, Microsoft Windows, PlayStation 4, Xbox One, Nintendo Switch
2019	Children of Morta	Dead Mage	Linux, OS X, Microsoft Windows, PlayStation 4, Xbox One, Nintendo Switch
2022	South of the Circle	State of Play	Microsoft Windows, PlayStation 4, PlayStation 5, Xbox One, Xbox Series X/S, Nintendo Switch
2023	The Invincible	Starward Industries	Microsoft Windows, PlayStation 5, Xbox Series X/S
2024	The Thaumaturge	Fool's Theory	Microsoft Windows, PlayStation 5, Xbox Series X/S
2024	Creatures of Ava	Inverge Studios, Chibig	Microsoft Windows, Xbox Series X/S
2024	Indika	Odd Meter	Microsoft Windows, PlayStation 5, Xbox Series X/S, Nintendo Switch
2025	Death Howl	The Outer Zone	Microsoft Windows, PlayStation 5, Xbox Series X/S, Nintendo Switch
2026	Moonlighter 2: The Endless Vault	Digital Sun	Microsoft Windows, PlayStation 5, Xbox Series X/S, Nintendo Switch 2
2027	Trainwatch	Harvester Games	Microsoft Windows
TBA	Crop	Carbonara Games	Microsoft Windows

=== Canceled ===
Title	Platform(s)	Ref.
Project 8	Windows	

== Charity ==
The company announced in November 2022 that it would transfer proceeds from one of its most popular releases—This War of Mine—to organizations helping Ukraine rebuild from Russia's invasion.
