= Music of Hollow Knight =

Music from the video game Hollow Knight

The music of Hollow Knight comprises two soundtrack albums created and scored by Christopher Larkin. The first soundtrack album contains the soundtrack of Hollow Knight's base game, and was released on Bandcamp, prior to Hollow Knight's release, on 10 February 2017, and on GOG and Steam alongside the game on 24 February 2017. It was later released on vinyl in early 2018. The shorter second album, "Gods and Nightmares", contains the soundtrack of Hollow Knight's four free content packs, (Note: The track "Pale Court" does not play in-game in Hollow Knight, even after all its content packs were released; the track was composed to be a bonus for the "Gods and Nightmares" album.) and was released digitally on 9 August 2018, and on vinyl in late 2018.

== Development ==
Inspired by the success of Team Cherry's Kickstarter for Hollow Knight, Larkin "sent over some ideas for what a theme for the game could sound like." Soon after this, he was brought on as Hollow Knight's lead composer and sound designer. Larkin was asked to create a soundtrack demonstrating "dark elegance", while also using "minimal instrumentation". Team Cherry also requested that the soundtrack remain "classical and melancholic." Larkin, when creating Hollow Knight's soundtrack, was inspired by the music of games such as The Legend of Zelda: Ocarina of Time and Final Fantasy VII. Larkin used soft piano extensively in the soundtrack, while also using other instruments such as the flute, the oboe, and the organ. Larkin also decided to use different instruments depending on the setting the song was planned to be played in. Examples include "[using] instruments [he] often associate[d] with nature, such as the harp and marimba" for the song "Greenpath", and using the organ for the track "Soul Sanctum", which he believes "replicates the sacredness, or perhaps "old scholarly" vibe of the space."

== Releases ==
=== Hollow Knight – Official Soundtrack ===
Hollow Knight – Official Soundtrack

Soundtrack album by Christopher Larkin
- Released: 10 February 2017
- Genre: Video game music
- Length: 64:23

Hollow Knight – Official Soundtrack, also known as Hollow Knight (Original Soundtrack), comprises the music featured in the base game of Hollow Knight.

Timothy Cheel played the viola for the tracks "Dirtmouth" and "Hollow Knight", while Amelia Jones provided the soprano for "City of Tears".

All tracks are written by Christopher Larkin.

Official Soundtrack
No.	Title	Length
1.	"Enter Hallownest"	1:29
2.	"Dirtmouth"	1:55
3.	"Crossroads"	2:27
4.	"False Knight"	3:04
5.	"Greenpath"	3:37
6.	"Hornet"	2:46
7.	"Reflection"	1:39
8.	"Mantis Lords"	1:45
9.	"City of Tears"	2:58
10.	"Dung Defender"	2:07
11.	"Crystal Peak"	4:08
12.	"Fungal Wastes"	3:04
13.	"Decisive Battle"	2:05
14.	"Soul Sanctum"	4:30
15.	"Resting Grounds"	2:12
16.	"Queen's Gardens"	1:46
17.	"The White Lady"	1:19
18.	"Broken Vessel"	1:59
19.	"Kingdom's Edge"	2:21
20.	"Nosk"	1:50
21.	"Dream"	2:01
22.	"Dream Battle"	2:25
23.	"White Palace"	4:18
24.	"Sealed Vessel"	5:45
25.	"Radiance"	2:17
26.	"Hollow Knight"	1:36
Total length:		64:23

=== Hollow Knight – Gods and Nightmares ===
Hollow Knight - Gods and Nightmares

Soundtrack album by Christopher Larkin
- Released: 9 August 2018
- Genre: Video game music
- Length: 33:38

Hollow Knight – Gods and Nightmares comprises the music featured in Hollow Knight's four free content packs.

The track "Pale Court" was performed by Accord Quartet and Péter Kiss, and was arranged by Steven Tanoto.

All tracks are written by Christopher Larkin.

Gods and Nightmares
No.	Title	Length
1.	"Hive Knight"	2:02
2.	"Truth, Beauty and Hatred"	1:58
3.	"Nightmare Lantern (Interlude)"	0:17
4.	"The Grimm Troupe"	2:18
5.	"Nightmare King"	2:50
6.	"White Defender"	3:39
7.	"Dreamers"	0:53
8.	"Pale Court"	3:52
9.	"Gods & Glory"	2:52
10.	"Daughter of Hallownest"	2:56
11.	"Godhome"	1:59
12.	"Sisters of Battle"	1:51
13.	"Haunted Foes"	2:37
14.	"Furious Gods"	1:07
15.	"Pure Vessel"	2:27
Total length:		33:38

== Reception ==
Writing for GameSpot, Alessandro Barbosa called the soundtrack a "wonderful musical [score] that breathe[s] an immense amount of personality into each area with fitting backdrops". Tom Marks of IGN commended how "individual melodies and instruments will shift in and out as you move from screen to screen", and stated that "the soundtrack has quickly become one of my favorites." Writing for Kotaku, Kirk Hamilton praised the soundtrack and stated that "Christopher Larkin’s elegiac musical score ably defines the game’s mournful tone, while mixing seamlessly with his wonderfully daffy sound design." NintendoLife writer Jon Mundy called the music "somber", and stated that it "perfectly encapsulate[s] the feeling of exploring a fallen kingdom." HobbyConsolas writer Álvaro Alonso loved the game's soundtrack, especially its boss battle themes, and its melancholic piano compositions.

Sam Goldner of Bandcamp Daily praised the soundtrack, noting that Larkin's score "plays a huge part in welcoming players into the sprawling, forsaken world of Hallownest." Polygon writer Chelsea Stark greatly enjoyed the soundtrack, stating that some of Larkin's melodies "seemed to embolden prideful enemies", that some "[hinted] at a sense of curiosity... and [at] the possibility of rejuvenation", while some others would "sink [her] into melancholy"; she cited "City of Tears" as an excellent example of the latter. Writing for TheGamer, Sam Hallahan stated that the soundtrack is "masterfully orchestrated" and that the main track "sums up the game and the world [of Hallownest] perfectly, and prepares you for the feeling of delving into it for the first time." He also called Larkin's work "unparalleled," noting that the music "carries [the game] to new heights", and that it helps it be "something truly special." Also writing for TheGamer, Abigail Lonngi heavily praised the "Gods and Nightmares" song "Nightmare King", stating it "succeeds in fully delivering the darkness, ruthlessness, and kingliness of [the boss it plays for, Grimm]."
