= Floodland (video game) =

- Cover art
- Developer: Vile Monarch
- Publisher: Ravenscourt
- Platform: Microsoft Windows
- Release: November 15, 2022
- Genre: City-builder
- Mode: Single-player

Floodland is a 2022 city-building game developed by Vile Monarch and published by Ravenscourt. It was released on November 15, 2022 for Microsoft Windows. Players control a civilization of people as they attempt to survive in a devastated world flooded as a result of climate change. It received mixed reviews.

== Gameplay ==
Floodland is a city-building game, where players control a colony of people attempting to survive in a world consumed by flooding caused by climate change. The player can choose between four different types of "clans", which all have their own unique advantages and outlooks on life. The settlers that the player has can be assigned to construct buildings, collect resources, and perform expeditions for supplies. As the player progresses, they can encounter other clans that have different worldviews and priorities than their own people. The player must introduce laws to ensure amicable relations between clans and prevent hostility, which can cause crime and unrest. Stores of food and water must be managed by the player as they research new technologies and create relationships between clans.

== Reception ==
Reception

Aggregate scores
Aggregator	Score
Metacritic	73/100
OpenCritic	48% recommend

Review scores
Publication	Score
GamesRadar+	4/5
PC Gamer (US)	76/100

According to the review aggregator website Metacritic, Floodland received mixed reviews for its PC versions. Fellow review aggregator OpenCritic assessed that the game received fair approval, being recommended by 48% of critics. GamesRadar liked the story, city building elements, and UI but was frustrated by the number of software bugs on launch. Rock Paper Shotgun enjoyed how clans interacted and integrated with each other but felt as though the player would spend too much time waiting for new technologies to be researched. The Games Machine enjoyed the narrative and lauded the game as less challenging than other city building video games such as Frostpunk.
