= Urbek City Builder =

- Developer: Estudios Kremlinois
- Publisher: RockGame S.A.
- Engine: Unity
- Release: July 13, 2022
- Genre: City builder

Urbek City Builder is a city-building video game developed by Estudios Kremlinois and published by RockGame. The game also has a puzzle aspect.

== Gameplay and description ==
Unlike many entries in the city builder genre, Urbek does not use money, or "random elements" such as disasters.

Buildings have varied requirements including resources and relative placement. Buildings can upgrade to other types of buildings depending on these relative placements. Relative placements can also have negative impacts on buildings, such as pollution affecting housing. In addition to direct placement of some buildings, the game also uses a zone mechanic.

Graham Smith of Rock Paper Shotgun suggests the building requirements gives the game a puzzle game aspect. Luke Plunkett of Kotaku explains how the puzzles also arise from the number and spacing of buildings.

Urbek uses voxel graphics. Details can be inspected up close by exploring a city in a first-person view.

The game includes a tutorial made up of text dialog boxes.

== Reception ==
Smith praised the voxel art, suggesting Urbek has better graphics than many indie games in the genre. Frances Addison of KeenGamer found the building design appealing.

Smith compared the addition of the puzzle aspect to Concrete Jungle.

Plunkett wrote that despite the apparent complexity of some of the game mechanics, the gameplay felt more relaxing than other city builders; other reviewers found a similar atmosphere.

Addison also wrote about creativity in the gameplay and suggested "the core of the game is putting your city together just as you want it to be". Plunkett similarly suggests that the game has "malleability" allowing for creativity by the player.
