= The Ice Schooner =

Novel by Michael Moorcock

The Ice Schooner is a post-apocalyptic fantasy novel by Michael Moorcock first published in 1966. It is a grimdark retelling of Moby Dick combined with elements of Joseph Conrad's sailing adventures.

== Premise ==
Thousands of years in the future, earth has undergone a second ice age caused by climate change and nuclear war. Books, electricity and even wooden furniture have become scarce luxuries. The population worship a goddess known as the Ice Mother and offer blood to appease her, although the cities no longer practice human sacrifice. On the frozen Mato Grosso, the descendants of British, Russian and Scandinavian survivors from the Antarctic research base established eight cities constructed from ice blocks, stones, scrap metal, whalebone, animal skins, and ancient pieces of plastic or fiberglass scavenged from wrecked ships and aircraft. The most prominent of these cities are Brershill, Friesgalt and Abergelt, which in the past had fought short but bloody wars over trade routes, land and whaling rights. As the last guns ran out of bullets centuries ago, the weapons are modified whaling or hunting implements such as harpoons, flensing cutlasses, swords, axes, knives, javelins, and bow and arrows. The inhabitants survive on meat, lichen and plants grown with crude hydroponics systems. The most common beverages are beer made from pond scum consumed by the whalers and a tea-like herbal brew called Hess favored by the nobility. Clothing is made from leather, fur and cloth woven from the whales' thick hair. Technology has reverted to an early 19th century level and the economy depends on land yachts hunting mutant carnivorous land whales.

== Locations ==
Each fortified city-state on the Mato Grosso is an oligarchy ruled by a hereditary noble house or guild that controls the whaling and merchant fleets. The names of the eight cities hint at the original nationalities of their founders. Brershill, the most conservative and traditionalist of the cities, is a British English pronunciation of Brazil, the country that once controlled the region. Abergelt is derived from the German phrase aber kalt, meaning very cold. Friesgalt, the wealthiest city with a largely Slavic population, is a Russian pronunciation of the English phrase freezing cold. Keltshill is a Scandinavian pronunciation of cold chill. Djobhaben is a French Canadian pronunciation of the name of its founder, Johansen. Chaddergalt is a derivative of the English phrase chattering cold. Fyorsgepp, the southernmost city, is named after a survivor named Fedor who discovered the gap or crevasse in which it was built.

The cities have a rigid caste system comprising aristocrats, officers, scholars and clergy, liveried domestic servants and guards from the nobles' retinue, whalers, merchants, and the service industry. A person's social status determines the location of their residence. The nobility live deep within the crevasse where it is warmer and better protected from the elements, the middle classes live below ground level, and the commoners live in apartments on or above the surface. Each city has its own unique outlook on the cult of the Ice Mother; Abergeltians, for example, hold birds in high esteem as messengers of the Ice Mother and prefer sky burials over interring the dead beneath the ice.

Those who do not live in one of the eight cities are seen as barbarians. Most barbarians live a nomadic existence hunting seals, walrus or small whales and using polar bears as mounts. The majority of them worship the Ice Mother and continue to practice human sacrifice long after it was suppressed in the eight cities, but some cults in the North worship the gods of the volcano and use fire arrows.

== Plot ==
Konrad Arflane is an unemployed whaling skipper who leaves his home in Brershill after his ship was sold by its owner to pay a debt. On the ice, he saves the life of Lord Pyotr Rorfresne of Friesgalt, the largest and most prosperous city. Rorfresne's ship was wrecked while searching for New York, a legendary city of lost knowledge reputedly engulfed by the ice centuries ago. In Friesgalt, Arflane meets Rorfresne's daughter Ulrika and nephew Manfred and makes an enemy of Ulrika's husband Janek. Pyotr claims to have discovered the route to the lost city of New York and urges Arflane to lead an expedition and find out what is causing the ice to melt. Ulrika has sex with Arflane and reveals she is trapped in an unhappy, loveless arranged marriage to Janek. Arflane is invited to stay as Pyotr Rorfresne's guest, but chooses instead to lodge at the Shipsmasher Hotel owned by the retired harpooner Flatch who lost an arm, a leg and an eye to a particularly large and ferocious bull whale.

Arflane participates in a whale hunt with his friend Jarhann Brenn, Manfred Rorfresne and Pyotr's bastard son Urquart, a famous harpooner. An exceptionally aggressive bull whale destroys several boats, crushes Brenn to death and attempts to maul Arflane, but it is singlehandedly killed by Urquart. Returning from the hunt, Arflane is informed that Pyotr has died and left him the Ice Spirit, the finest ship in Friesgalt's fleet on the condition he sails her to New York using a map drawn by Pyotr. Ulrika and Manfred volunteer to accompany Arflane to fulfil Pyotr's wishes, reluctantly accompanied by Janek. First Officer Petchnyoff is a lackey of Janek Ulsen and Second Officer Hinsen is a former captain demoted to lieutenant for wrecking one of Pyotr Rorfresne's whaleboats. Urquart, a devoted worshipper of the city's patron goddess the Ice Mother, joins the crew as third officer. Arflane and Ulrika secretly become lovers.

During the voyage the crew encounters encounter volcanoes, hostile barbarians, strange animals and dangerous crevasses. First Lieutenant Petchynoff attempts to murder Arflane on Janek's orders. After Petchnyoff is killed, Arflane places Janek under arrest and openly cohabits with Ulrika. The crew participate in a second whale hunt and see an unusual flock of green birds. Hinsen is killed by a barbarian's arrow and Urquart is promoted to First Lieutenant. Some of the crew mutiny after boatswain Fedor is speared to death by Urquart for demanding the expedition returns to Freisgalt. The Ice Spirit, already badly damaged from the barbarian attack is wrecked by an avalanche that causes the cliffs to collapse.

The survivors attempt to continue on skis but are captured by the barbarian chieftain Donal of Kamfor and his human sacrifice cult. Urquart joins the cultists and emasculates Manfred as a sacrifice to the Ice Mother. He strips and attempts to kill his sister Ulrika with a knife but Arflane fights and kills Urquart with his own harpoon. Donal and his priest spare Ulrika and Arflane when Ulsen informs them that Urquart was Ulrika's brother and thus an acceptable substitute sacrifice due to his noble blood. The corpses of Manfred and Urquart are buried in the ice and the remaining explorers learn to ride the polar bears used as mounts by Donal and his tribe. Using Pyotr's chart they reach New York and realise the skyscrapers are not encased in ice, but protruding from a large plexiglass dome deep beneath the surface. Arflane and Ulrika are separated from Donal's barbarians when part of the plexiglass dome on which they are standing lowers beneath the surface.

In the city Arflane is attacked by a jealous Janek and is forced to kill him. The inhabitants of New York are the descendants of American scientists from the research station in Greenland who wear red hazmat suits and masks. Their leader is a dwarf named Peter Ballantine who explains that New York is responsible for melting the ice as part of a 200 year plan to restore earth to its previous state. He intends to establish diplomatic relations with the eight cities and help them adapt to the changes, which Ulrika enthusiastically agrees to. The inhabitants of New York use a helicopter to return Ulrika to Friesgalt. Ulrika urges Arflane to return with her to Friesgalt and be her consort, but Arflane cannot let go of the old ways and chooses to continue heading north on skis to find the Ice Mother, his ultimate fate unknown.

== Prequel ==
Keith Roberts in 1967 wrote a short story called Coranda set in the city of Brershill before Arflane and Rorfresne's expedition to New York. Coranda is a vain and spoiled young woman who arrogantly compares herself to the Ice Mother. She promises to marry the man who brings the horn of a narwhal, referred to in the book as a unicorn. This elusive species of land whale is so rare that many whalemen consider them legendary creatures. Five whaling ships set out in search of the herd, but one turns back and another is lost with all hands.

The landship captain Karl Stromberg of Abergelt and two rival suitors from Abergelt and Keltshill track down and pursue a herd of land narwhals to win the hand of the beautiful but cruel titular character. Mard Lipshill of Abergelt and Frey Skalter of Keltshill both perish during the hunt, but against the odds Stromberg successfully spears a whale calf and returns to Brershill where he overhears Coranda in the company of other men. Angered by Coranda's selfishness and the pointless death of his two friends, Stromberg places the severed, bleeding head of the narwhal on Coranda's doorstep and leaves Brershill, his faith in the Ice Mother restored. The story was published in a paperback omnibus book in 2011.

== Adaptations ==
In 2025 the Ice Schooner was adapted as an unofficial podcast

== Cast ==
- Konrad Arflane of Brershill, skipper of the Ice Spirit and an incarnation of the Eternal Champion
- Pyotr Rorfresne, Ice Lord of Freisgalt
- Ulrika Ulsen, Pyotr's daughter and heir
- Janek Ulsen, Ulrika's husband
- Manfred Rorfresne, Pyotr's nephew
- Long Lance Urquart, Pyotr's bastard who is said to be greatest living harpooner
- Peter Ballantine, a scientist with dwarfism who is mayor of New York
- Donal of Kamfor, a black man who leads a cult
- Petchynoff, first lieutenant of the Ice Spirit
- Hinsen, second lieutenant of the Ice Spirit
- Fedor, boatswain of the Ice Spirit
- Jarhan Brenn, skipper of the Tender Maiden
- Flatch, disabled ex-harpooner and owner of the Shipsmasher Hotel

== See also ==
- Frostpunk
- The Day After Tomorrow
- Snowpiercer
