= Concrete Jungle (video game) =

2015 video game

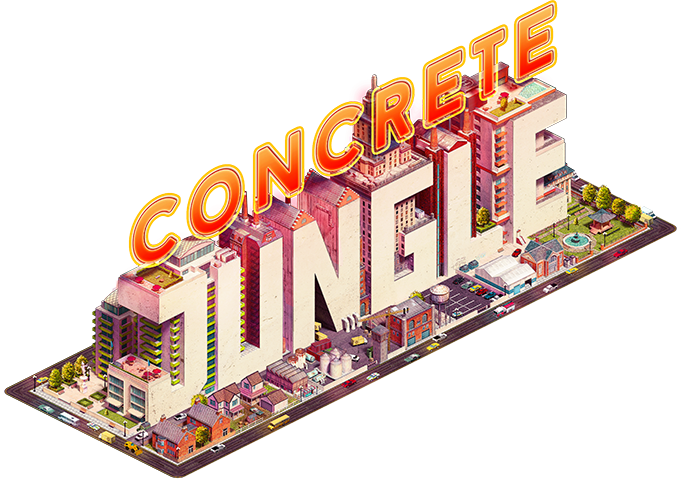
- Developer: ColePowered Games
- Publisher: ColePowered Games
- Platforms: Windows, OS X, iOS, Android
- Release: Windows, OS X: WW: September 23, 2015; iOS: WW: September 28, 2016
- Genres: Deck-building, city-building
- Modes: Single-player, multiplayer

Concrete Jungle is a city-building game developed and published by British studio ColePowered Games. The game was released in September 2015 on Microsoft Windows and OS X and in September 2016 for iOS. The game is the successor to MegaCity.

== Gameplay ==
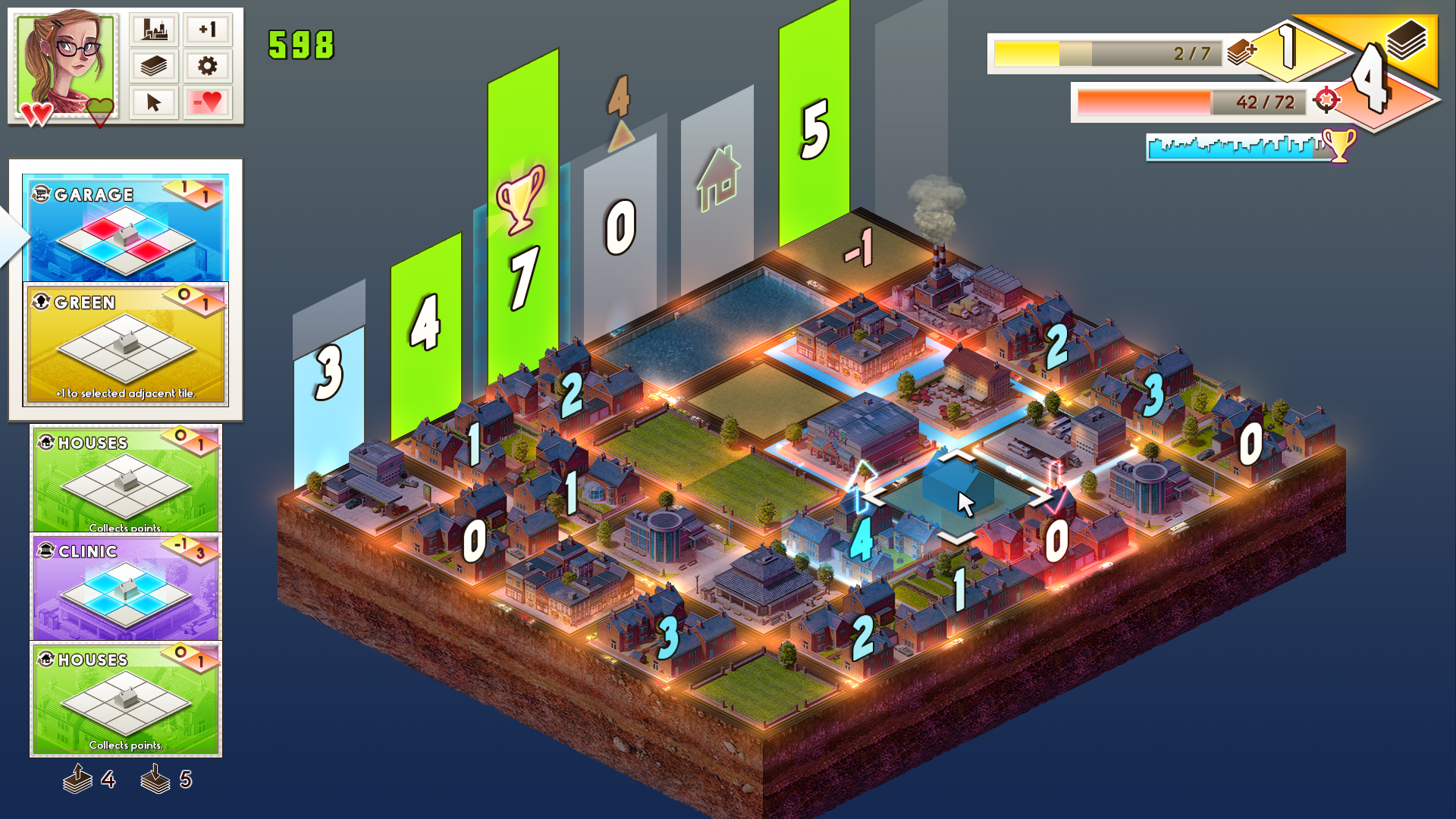
Gameplay screenshot

Concrete Jungle is card-based city-building game in which the player must use different types of cards to reach the required point count for each row.
