= Race the Sun (video game) =

2013 video game

- Developer: Flippfly
- Publisher: Flippfly
- Composer: Forest San Filippo
- Engine: Unity
- Platforms: Linux; Microsoft Windows; OS X; PlayStation 3; PlayStation 4; PlayStation Vita; Android; iOS; Wii U; Xbox One
- Release: Linux, OS X, Windows; August 19, 2013; PlayStation 3, PlayStation 4, PlayStation Vita; October 21, 2014; Wii U; October 8, 2015; Xbox One; April 21, 2017
- Genre: Endless running
- Mode: Single-player

Race the Sun is a 2013 endless running video game developed and published by American indie studio Flippfly and released on August 19, 2013, for Microsoft Windows, Mac OS X, and Linux platforms. In Race the Sun, the player controls a solar-powered spaceship, dodging various objects on the way such as laser beams, other ships and other stationary obstacles, while gathering pick ups that can be used in game, all while the sun slowly sets on the horizon. The game ends either when the player hits an object and the ship gets destroyed, or when the sun sets.

The game has also been released on various gaming consoles. It was released on PlayStation 3, PlayStation 4, and PlayStation Vita on October 21, 2014, then on Wii U on October 8, 2015. An Xbox One version was announced for release on April 21, 2017.

== Gameplay ==
In Race the Sun, the player controls a solar-powered spacecraft as it races through a minimalist landscape with abstract shapes and various obstacles. Levels are pseudo-procedurally-generated and separated into distinct regions, each region having different sets of challenges. The ship's speed remains constant as long as the ship remains in direct sunlight, but if the ship falls into shadow or clips objects, the ship's speed will drop. Direct collision with an object will cause the ship to be destroyed and end the run. Further, if the player's ship remains in shadow too long — such as when the sun finally sets — the ship will stall and the run will be over. The player continually earns points as long as the ship is moving. Throughout each region are various collectable objects. The most common are blue pyramids that, if five are collected without any collisions, will boost the player's scoring multiplier by one. Others give the player's ship a short speed boost which allows the ship to outpace the sun and thus raise it in the sky for a short moment, a single-time jump to clear obstacles, and a single-time use shield to prevent the ship's destruction on a direct collision.

There is also a larger meta-game feature that requires the player to complete various missions, three presented at any time, to earn experience points to build an experience level. Missions include scoring metrics, avoiding collisions during multiple regions, or colliding a number of times; some of which can be completed over multiple race attempts. Gaining a level grants a reward that helps in future races, such as starting with a higher scoring multiplier, gaining a booster for the ship to help collect powerups or store multiple jump boost, and the like.

There are three levels included as part of the core game: a standard level, an "apocalypse" level in which the player moves faster through more difficult obstacles, and a maze-style obstacle course played from a top-down perspective. These regions and levels change on a daily basis for all players, and online scoreboards allow users to compare their performance to others. The game also includes Steam Workshop integration, through which players can play levels created by other players.

== Development ==
Race the Sun first appeared as a Kickstarter crowdfunding project. Flippfly sought to raise $20,000 to complete this game, and by March 7, 2013, more than $21,000 was pledged. Although prior to release Flippfly had mainly worked on Mobile games, the developers noted that the mobile market was almost exclusively made up of free to play games and opted instead for a PC release.

Race the Sun was released to the public in August 2013, with Flippfly selling the title through their website, while also waiting on its approval through the crowd-driven Steam Greenlight process. Despite getting word of mouth, initial sales of the game were poor, leading Flippfly to work with other indie game developers and the Humble Bundle to launch a "Not On Steam" sale in early October 2013 to highlight the lack of visibility that titles that are not on the Steam service. This sale helped to boost Race the Sun and other games' sales, and for those presently at Steam Greenlight, increased voting for these titles. In the case of Race the Sun, the game was successfully greenlit for Steam on the same day the "Not for Steam" sale launched, and subsequently was available on the Steam service in December 2013.

== Reception ==
Reception

Aggregate score
Aggregator	Score
Metacritic	PC: 79/100; PS4: 76/100 iOS: 78/100; WIIU: 78/100; XONE: 84/100

Review scores
Publication	Score
Edge	8/10
GameSpot	8/10
TouchArcade	iOS: 5/5

Race the Sun received positive reviews from critics. Review aggregator website Metacritic gave the PC version 79/100. GameSpot awarded the game an 8/10, praising its minimalist design and "robust creation suite".
