= Pac-Man 256 =

2015 video game

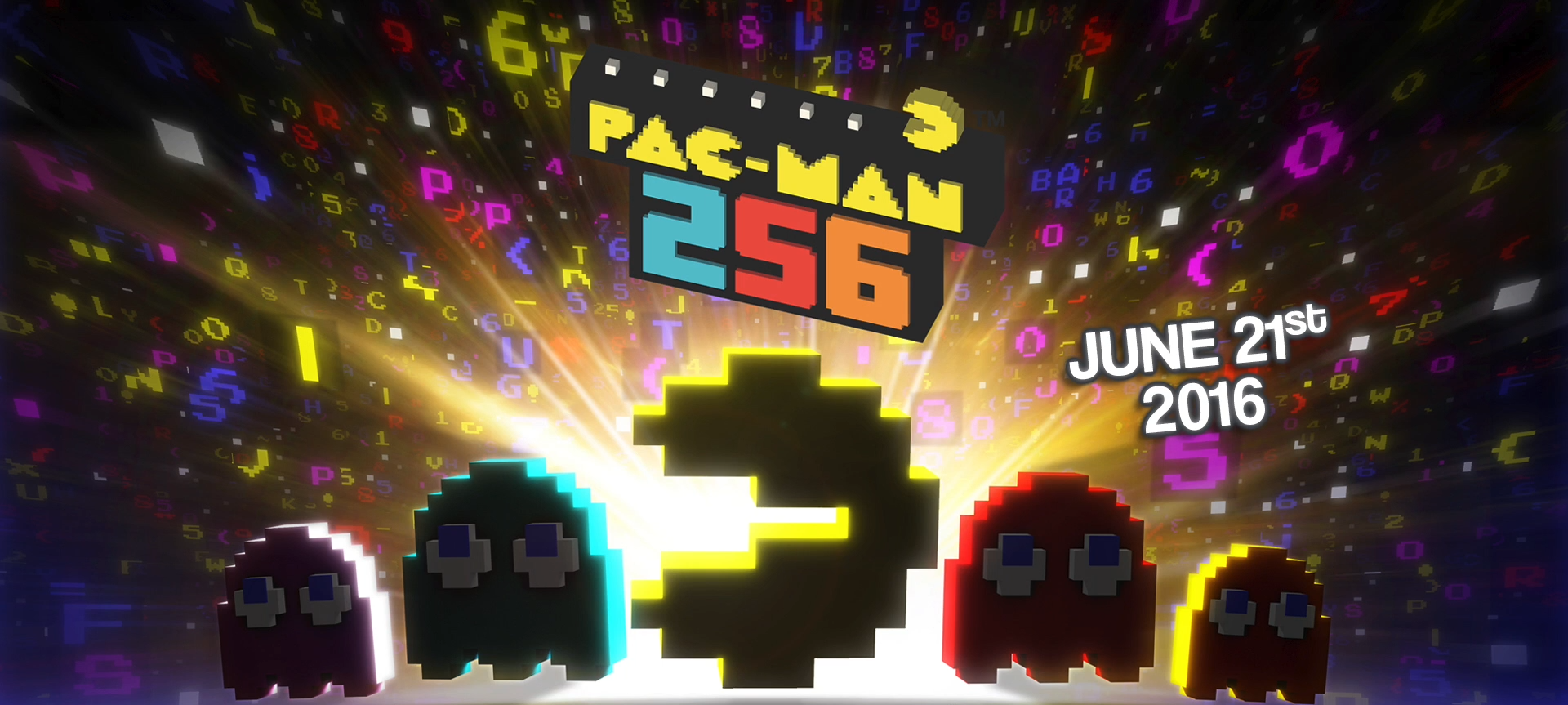
- Key art
- Developers: 3 Sprockets; Hipster Whale; Bandai Namco Studios Vancouver
- Publisher: Bandai Namco Entertainment
- Series: Pac-Man
- Engine: Unity
- Platforms: Android, iOS, Microsoft Windows, PlayStation 4, Xbox One, macOS, Linux, Android TV, Apple TV
- Release: iOS, Android; August 19, 2015; Windows, macOS, Linux, PlayStation 4, Xbox One; June 21, 2016
- Genre: Endless runner
- Modes: Single-player, multiplayer

Pac-Man 256 is a 2015 endless runner video game developed by Hipster Whale, 3 Sprockets and Bandai Namco Studios Vancouver, and published by Bandai Namco Entertainment. The game is part of the Pac-Man series and is inspired by the original Pac-Man game's infamous Level 256 glitch, as well as Hipster Whale's own game Crossy Road, which previously featured a Pac-Man mode.

The game was originally released for iOS and Android devices on August 19, 2015 in commendation of Pac-Man's 35th anniversary. An enhanced version, Pac-Man 256+, was released for the Apple Arcade subscription service for iOS, macOS and Apple TV.

== Gameplay ==
Pac-Man 256 sees the players take control of Pac-Man as he continues across an endless maze, collecting dots and power-ups while avoiding enemy ghosts. The game ends if Pac-Man comes into contact with a ghost or falls behind and is consumed by a chasing glitch at the bottom of the maze. Eating 256 dots in a row awards the player a blast that clears all on-screen enemies. Along with power pellets, which enable Pac-Man to eat ghosts, Pac-Man can equip and obtain various power-ups such as lasers, tornadoes, and clones to attack the ghosts, as well as collect score-multiplying fruit. Up to three power-ups can be equipped. Power-ups are unlocked by waiting 24 hours after unlocking a power-up. In the console and PC versions, they are unlocked by eating a specified number of Pac-Dots.

Prior to version 2.0, the game featured a "credit" system, which would require one credit to be used if a game was played with power-ups equipped or the player wished to revive Pac-Man. Version 2.0 replaced the Credits with Coins, which are obtained by clearing missions, collecting them on the maze or by viewing sponsored videos, which can be used to upgrade power-ups, unlock themes (in the mobile version), or revive Pac-Man.

There are also themes which change the look of the game; these can be purchased with large amounts of Coins or by spending real money. In the console and PC versions, all themes are unlocked by default.

The console and PC versions of the game adds an exclusive cooperative multiplayer game mode, where up to four players work together to set the highest score possible. The appearance of each Pac-Man can be customized. Like the main game, the goal is for every player to get as far as possible and contribute to the group score as much as possible. If a player is caught by a ghost, a player power-up appears, which revives that player. The game ends once the last player still in play dies, be it by getting caught by a ghost or consumed by the glitch.

Each ghost has their own specific behavior: Blinky (red) actively chases Pac-Man, Pinky (pink) rushes forward whenever Pac-Man enters her sight, Inky (cyan) loops around specific areas, Clyde (orange) travels downwards while changing to Pac-Man's nearest direction, Sue (purple) slowly moves horizontally towards Pac-Man's direction in groups of three, Funky (green) roams around in a horizontal line in groups of four, Spunky (gray) sleeps in a spot, but awakens and chases Pac-Man if he gets near, and a new ghost named Glitchy has the ability to teleport while chasing Pac-Man.

== Reception ==
Reception

Aggregate score
Aggregator	Score
Metacritic	(iOS) 88/100 (PS4) 79/100 (XONE) 80/100

Review scores
Publication	Score
Destructoid	7/10
Pocket Gamer	4.5/5
Push Square	7/10
USgamer	4/5

Pac-Man 256 received "generally favorable" reviews according to review aggregator Metacritic.

== Ports and re-releases ==
The game was originally released as a free-to-play title for iOS and Android on August 20, 2015. On June 21, 2016, Bandai Namco released a version of the game for the PlayStation 4, Xbox One, and PC (Windows, macOS, Linux), featuring additional features like multiplayer for up to 4 players, a new power-up, and no longer having to wait a certain amount of time to get power-ups, and instead having to eat a number of Pac-Dots. The console version of Pac-Man 256 is included in the compilation title Pac-Man Museum+, released in 2022. It would also mark the first time the game was ported to Nintendo Switch.

Pac-Man 256+, a version of the game exclusive for the Apple Arcade subscription service, was released on December 4, 2024 for iOS, macOS and Apple TV. The game features various alterations to the gameplay, such as new upgrades and altered gameplay mechanics.

== Awards ==
Pac-Man 256 was nominated for Best Mobile/Handheld Game at The Game Awards 2015, but lost to Lara Croft Go. It was also nominated for Mobile Game of the Year at the 19th Annual D.I.C.E. Awards, but was ultimately awarded to Fallout Shelter.

List of awards and nominations
Award	Category	Result	Ref.
The Game Awards 2015	Best Mobile/Handheld Game	Nominated	
19th Annual D.I.C.E. Awards	Mobile Game of the Year	Nominated	

== See also ==
- Outfolded
