= This War of Mine =

2014 video game

- Developer: 11 bit studios
- Publisher: 11 bit studios
- Directors: Michał Drozdowski; Przemysław Marszał
- Designer: Rafał Włosek
- Programmer: Grzegorz Mazur
- Artist: Dominik Zieliński
- Writer: Based on inspiring idea of Grzegorz Miechowski
- Composers: Piotr Musiał; Krzysztof Lipka
- Platforms: Microsoft Windows; OS X; Linux; Android; iOS; PlayStation 4; Xbox One; Nintendo Switch; PlayStation 5; Xbox Series X/S
- Release: November 14, 2014: Windows, OS X, Linux; WW: November 14, 2014 Android; WW: July 14, 2015 iOS; WW: July 15, 2015 The Little Ones PS4, Xbox One; WW: January 29, 2016 Windows; WW: June 1, 2016 Complete Edition Nintendo Switch; WW: November 27, 2018 Final Cut Windows; WW: November 14, 2019 PS5, Xbox Series X/S; WW: May 10, 2022
- Genre: Survival
- Mode: Single-player

This War of Mine is a 2014 war survival video game developed and published by Polish developer 11 Bit Studios. The game, inspired by the siege of Sarajevo among other conflicts, differs from most war-themed video games by focusing on the civilian experience of war rather than frontline combat. Characters have to make many difficult decisions in order to survive everyday dangers. There are various endings for each character, depending on the decisions made in the game. The game has received multiple DLCs and sold over 9 million units worldwide across multiple platforms.

== Gameplay ==
This War of Mine is a 2D game in which players assume control of a group of civilian survivors as they struggle to survive in a war.

This War of Mine is a survival-themed strategy game where the player controls a group of civilian survivors hiding inside a damaged house in the besieged fictional city of Pogoren, Graznavia. The main goal of the game is to stay alive during the war using the tools and materials that the player can gather. Most of the characters under the player's control have no military background nor any kind of survival experience, and will require constant intervention by the player in order to stay alive. The player must maintain their characters' health, hunger, and mood levels until the declaration of a ceasefire, which occurs after a randomized duration.

In the daytime, the survivors will have to stay indoors because hostile snipers are present outside, thereby offering the player time to craft tools from gathered materials, trade, upgrade the shelter, cook food and heal the survivors. At night, the player is given the opportunity to go out and search nearby areas for valuable resources to survive day by day. During their excursions, the survivors, controlled by players, can encounter other NPC survivors of the war, who they can choose to assist by offering food and medicine, or rob and kill. The player can also build a radio inside their shelter, which will provide useful information such as weather warnings, updates on the city's economy, and news of the ongoing war effort to help the player plan appropriate shelter upgrades and scavenging missions.

The player starts off with one to four survivors whose actions the player can control. The actions the player makes will change the type of endings each survivor has. Each character has one or two traits that helps/hinders the player, besides hidden, varying stats that affect combat, movement speed, and so on. Some traits are useful during certain days while others are useful all the time. For example, one character named Bruno has a trait called "Good Cook", which helps the player use less fuel and water when cooking meals or brewing moonshine; and Roman, a former rebel who is trained in combat. There are a total of twelve playable characters. The Little Ones DLC includes the possibility of adding an extra character, a child survivor, that cannot defend itself or perform any of the tasks needed to maintain the shelter at first. In addition, the child survivor must be given constant attention to prevent it from becoming depressed but can be taught by the other survivors to perform small chores like cooking, filtering water, or growing crops, and once bonded with an adult, it can sleep with them in the same bed at night, removing the need for separate beds for both.

== Development and release ==
The game was inspired by the extremely poor living conditions and wartime atrocities that Bosnian civilians endured during the 1992–96 Siege of Sarajevo, the longest city siege since World War II, among other conflicts. Developers researched hundreds of years' worth of civilian accounts of wartime. Charlie Hall in Polygon, describing the developers' efforts, writes:

This War of Mine is not about Ukraine. It's not about any single conflict. It is about every conflict, and every innocent person imprisoned inside them. This War of Mine is about Ypres in 1914. It's about Warsaw in 1944 and Sarajevo in '92. It's about Mogadishu in '93, Kabul in '03 [sic] and Fallujah in '04. It's about Syria in 2013. It's about Gaza right now.

This War of Mine was released for Microsoft Windows, MacOS, and Linux in November 2014. The Android port was released on July 14, 2015, followed by the iOS port on the following day (July 15). In November 2014, unlicensed copies of the game were made available online. The developer's response was to post a number of working Steam keys, encouraging downloaders to share them with friends, and buy the game if their financial situation allowed.

=== Post-release ===
A scenario editor was added into the game through update 1.3, which allows players to create and select survivors. The editor also allows environmental conditions and the length of conflicts to be changed.

Player-created content was released freely via the Steam Workshop as of update 2.0.

A DLC called War Childs was released for a limited time between March 9 and April 3, 2015, on Steam to raise funds for the War Child charity. This DLC contained unique street art pieces that players could find with three tiers of content, depending on the amount of money donated. On 3 April 2015 11 Bit Studios announced that the donations received had been enough to change the lives of over 350 children.

Another DLC, focusing on children, called The Little Ones was released for consoles on 29 January 2016 and PC on 1 June 2016.

To celebrate the game's third anniversary, 11 bit Studios released three story-driven DLC's called This War of Mine: Stories: Father's Promise (released on 14 November 2017), The Last Broadcast (released on 14 November 2018) and Fading Embers (released on 6 August 2019)

In November 2018, 11 bit studios announced This War Of Mine: Complete Edition exclusively for the Nintendo Switch, releasing later the same month. This version compiles all the content in a single package, including the original base game, the Anniversary Edition content, The Little Ones, and its episodic Fathers Promise and all upcoming content including The Last Broadcast, and Fading Embers. A physical retail version of the game was also released in Europe for the Nintendo Switch the same day, through Deep Silver.

On November 14, 2019, 11 bit studios released a free content update called This War of Mine: Final Cut.

On December 12, 2024, 11 bit studios released a new DLC entitled Forget Celebrations, focused on Katja, one of the characters from the original story and celebrating the 10th anniversary of the game.

== Reception ==
Reception

Aggregate score
Aggregator	Score				
Aggregator	iOS	NS	PC	PS4	Xbox One
Metacritic	90/100	80/100	83/100	78/100	78/100

Review scores
Publication	Score				
Publication	iOS	NS	PC	PS4	Xbox One
Destructoid	N/A	N/A	N/A	6.5/10	N/A
Edge	N/A	N/A	9/10	N/A	N/A
Eurogamer	N/A	N/A	8/10	N/A	N/A
Game Informer	N/A	N/A	8/10	N/A	N/A
GameRevolution	N/A	N/A	5/5	3.5/5	N/A
GameSpot	N/A	N/A	8/10	N/A	7/10
GameTrailers	N/A	N/A	8.5/10	N/A	N/A
GameZone	N/A	N/A	7.5/10	N/A	N/A
IGN	N/A	N/A	8.4/10	N/A	N/A
PlayStation Official Magazine – UK	N/A	N/A	N/A	8/10	N/A
Official Xbox Magazine (UK)	N/A	N/A	N/A	N/A	8/10
PC Gamer (UK)	N/A	N/A	80%	N/A	N/A
PC PowerPlay	N/A	N/A	8/10	N/A	N/A
TouchArcade	5/5	N/A	N/A	N/A	N/A
Digital Spy	N/A	N/A	4/5	N/A	N/A
Slant Magazine	N/A	N/A	N/A	2/5	N/A

=== Critical reception ===
The iOS version of This War of Mine received "universal acclaim", while the PC and console versions received "generally favorable reviews" according to the review aggregation website Metacritic.

The Digital Fix gave the PC version nine out of ten and said, "Whether you choose to perceive it through a moral lens or not, there's a great tactical survival mechanic driving this game beneath the didactics. Although the events it depicts are depressing to contemplate at length, I found myself coming back again and again to try and get it right somehow, beat the odds, and save my people." The same website also gave the PlayStation 4 version of The Little Ones eight out of ten and said, "While better on PC, the PS4 release brings this remarkable game to a new crowd." 411Mania gave the Xbox One version 8.5 out of 10 and said that it was "not a game I will recommend if you like settling down for a visceral experience, or earning XP, or shooting stuff dead. It's not fast paced. It's not much fun to actually play. It'll make you feel terrible about your actions at almost every turn. But in spite of all that, there is something so essential about this gaming experience that I urge you to give this game a try." Digital Spy gave the PC version four stars out of five and said that the "earnest human touch keeps This War of Mine compelling even when you mess up and the rubble all comes tumbling down around you, leaving you just enough hope for the next attempt that you'll dive back in and endure it all again." Metro UK gave the PS4 version seven out of ten and called it "A daring, and largely successful, attempt to show the civilian side of war, that succeeds as an interactive drama even when it occasionally fails as a game." However, Slant Magazine gave the same console version two stars out of five and said that the game "seems interested only in presenting a near-pornographic level of human despair in a warped attempt at edifying players."

During the 18th Annual D.I.C.E. Awards, the Academy of Interactive Arts & Sciences nominated This War of Mine for "Outstanding Achievement in Story".

The game reportedly made back its development costs in its first two days for sale, and had sold over 4.5 million units by April 2019.

=== Sales ===
The game sold about 700,000 copies during its first year of release. The game's release on consoles and mobile devices expanded its audience, and the game was able to maintain steady sales and growth five years after its initial launch, according to 11 bit's publishing director Paweł Feldman. As of January 2024, the game has sold over 9 million copies across all platforms.

== Impact ==
In 2020, the Polish Chancellery of the Prime Minister announced that This War of Mine would be added to the recommended reading list in Polish high schools during the academic year of 2020–2021. This was the first initiative in the world to add a video game to recommended readings in school. The Microsoft Windows version of the game is free to download from the Polish government's website, alongside lesson topics for teachers.

Following the Russian invasion of Ukraine, 11 Bit Studios announced that all profits earned from This War of Mine for seven days starting 24 February 2022 would be donated to the Ukrainian Red Cross to directly support victims. Within the week the company had raised over £500,000. In total, $850,000 was raised.

== Board game adaptation ==
Awaken Realms launched a successful Kickstarter campaign in 2016 for a board game adaptation of the video game, designed by Michael Oracz and Jakub Wiśniewski. The board game, which is a faithful reproduction or even port of the design of the video game, has received mostly favorable reviews for its role as an artistic statement or educational tool, although Charles Hall of Polygon recommends the video game instead.

After the video game's fund drive for the Ukrainian Red Cross, 11 Bit Studios and Awaken Realms sold off all remaining Kickstarter copies of the board game, with revenue beyond taxes and shipping going toward the Red Cross and a charity evacuating Ukrainian cancer patients.
