= Tomb of the Mask =

2016 video game

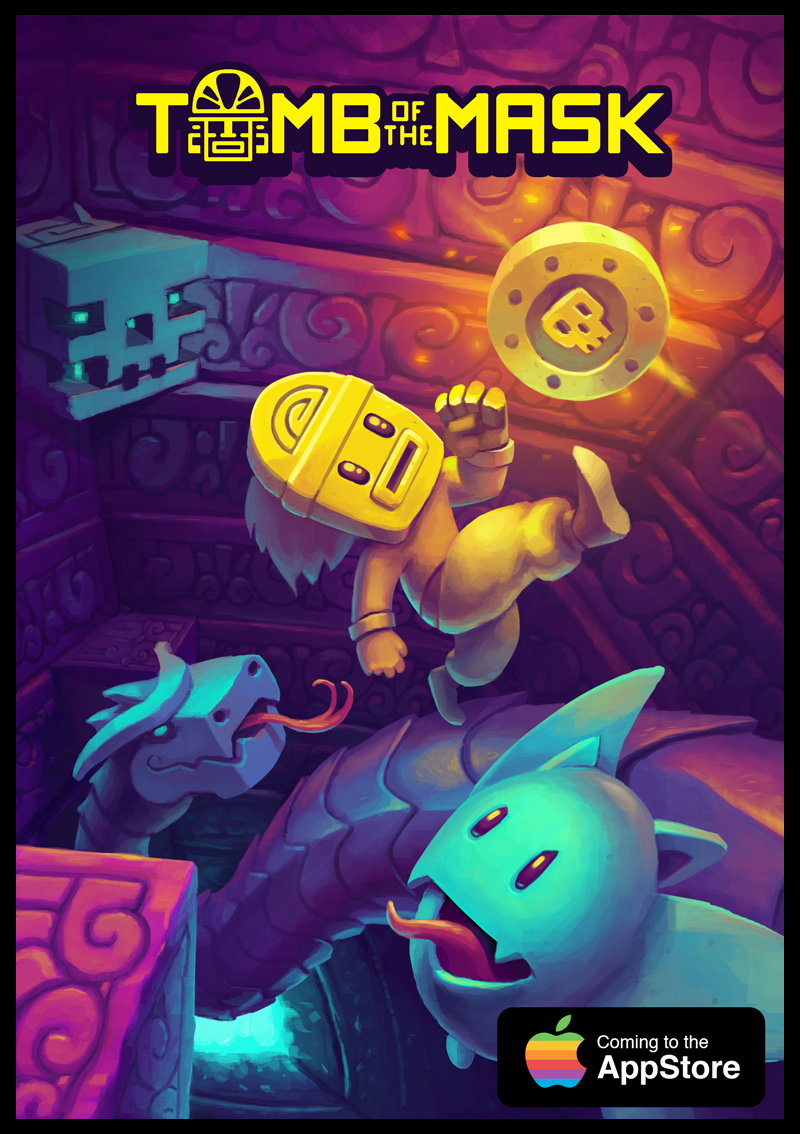
- Promotional poster
- Developer: Happymagenta
- Publisher: Playgendary
- Platforms: iOS, Android, Switch
- Release: iOS; February 9, 2016; Android; June 19, 2018; Nintendo Switch; October 27, 2021
- Genres: Puzzle, maze
- Mode: Single-player

Tomb of the Mask is a 2016 puzzle game developed by Lithuanian game developer Happymagenta and published by Cyprus-based video game developer Playgendary. It was released on February 9, 2016, for iOS, June 18, 2018 for Android, and October 27, 2021, for Nintendo Switch. A version for Apple Arcade, Tomb of the Mask+, was released in June 2024. It is an arcade-style puzzle game, divided into levels. The player moves the masked character through the obstacle-strewn areas to the exit, collecting coins along the way.

Tomb of the Mask received positive reviews, with Tom's Guide ranking it in their Top 25 underrated iPhone games, and CNET's Best mobile games. The success of Tomb of the Mask sparked a port for the Nintendo Switch, released in 2021. Multiple tips and tricks have been released for the game.

== Gameplay ==
The Arcade Mode in Tomb of the Mask

Tomb of the Mask is a fast-paced endless runner video game with gameplay in the style of Pac-Man. The player moves the character through a maze by swiping the screen in the four directions. The character cannot change direction until stopped by a wall or obstacle.

The player races an encroaching tide, which rises from the bottom of the screen and ends the game upon reaching the player. Like Pac-Man, the character earns points for collecting dots and coins in its path.

The player can also collect power-ups that grant temporary benefits, such as a magnet that attracts coins to the character, and a freeze that solidifies enemies in place. The player can use collected coins to buy permanent perks and increase power-up potency.

There are 16 total masks in the game the player can buy with in-game currency, the latter of which can also be purchased with in-game transactions.

To control the player in Tomb of the Mask, the player needs to swipe the screen in the direction the player wants to move, which will make the player move in a straight line. For example, if the player swipes left, the character will move left. In the Nintendo Switch version, the player can use the joy-stick or D-pad to move the character. The mazes in Tomb of the Mask have several hazards to avoid, such as Spikes, Spike traps, and Pufferfish.

Since the 1.2 update in late 2016, the Stage Mode has been added. The difference between Arcade mode and Stage mode is that unlike an endless arcade level, it is a stage where the player must complete a stage level and then the stage moves on, similarly to Super Mario Bros.

Arcade Mode is an endless stage with a multitude of hazards including rising lava. It features 2 online leaderboards (for the score and distance) and 60 achievements in Google Play Games and Apple Game Center.

== Release ==
Tomb of the Mask released for iOS on February 9, 2016, for Android on June 19, 2018, and for the Nintendo Switch on October 27, 2021.

== Reception ==
Reception

Aggregate score
Aggregator	Score
Metacritic	80/100

Review scores
Publication	Score
Gamezebo	4
Pocket Gamer	3.5
TouchArcade	4

Tomb of the Mask received "generally favorable reviews", according to the review aggregator website Metacritic. Don Reisinger from Tom's Guide ranked Tomb of the Mask in their Top 25 underrated iPhone games. Eli Hodapp from TouchArcade ranked Tomb of the Mask in their Top 100 Best Mobile games of 2016. Craig Grannell from Stuff.tv ranked Tomb of the Mask as "App of the week".

Many video game news reporters compared Tomb of the Mask to Pac-Man, such as player collecting dots (coins for Tomb of the Mask), the maze style between the two games, and the retro style for Tomb of the Mask.

Reviewers appreciated the game's aesthetic and fast pace. Alysia Judge from Pocket Gamer compared its gameplay mechanics with Pac-Man and its visual style with Downwell. Jim Squires from Gamezebo wrote that the game was accessible despite its fast pace.
