= Yodo1 =

Chinese mobile game publisher

Yodo1, Ltd.
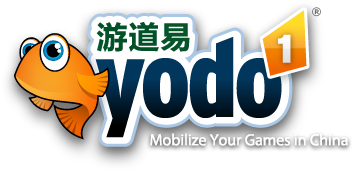
- Company type: Private
- Industry: Video games
- Founded: November 2011; 13 years ago
- Founders: Henry Fong; James LaLonde
- Headquarters: Beijing, China
- Key people: Henry Fong (CEO); James LaLonde (CGO)
- Website: yodo1.com

Yodo1, Ltd. is a Chinese mobile game publisher based in Beijing. Founded in November 2011, it is headed by co-founders Henry Fong and James LaLonde as chief executive officer and chief growth officer, respectively, and publishes games with a focus on the Chinese market. As of October 2019, games published by Yodo1 have been played by one billion users.

== History ==
Yodo1 was founded in November 2011 by a group of video game entrepreneurs. Founders include chief executive officer Henry Fong and chief growth officer James LaLonde. In a June 2012 round of seed funding led by Chang You Fund managing partner Zhi Tan, Yodo1 raised US$2 million from Chang You Fund. In June and August 2012, Yodo1 partnered with Robot Entertainment and HandyGames, respectively, to release their games in China. The company raised a further $5 million in a series A round from SingTel Group (the leader) and Chang You Fund in April 2013, and $11 million in a series B round led by GGV Capital in December 2013.
