= Uścińska =

Uścińska is a surname. Notable people with the surname include:

- Aleksandra Uścińska (born 1984), Polish taekwondo practitioner
- Gertruda Uścińska (born 1958), Polish lawyer
