= Scientific Information Centre and Academic Library =

Coordinates: 50.2606°N 19.0302°E

Scientific Information Centre and Academic Library (CINiBA)
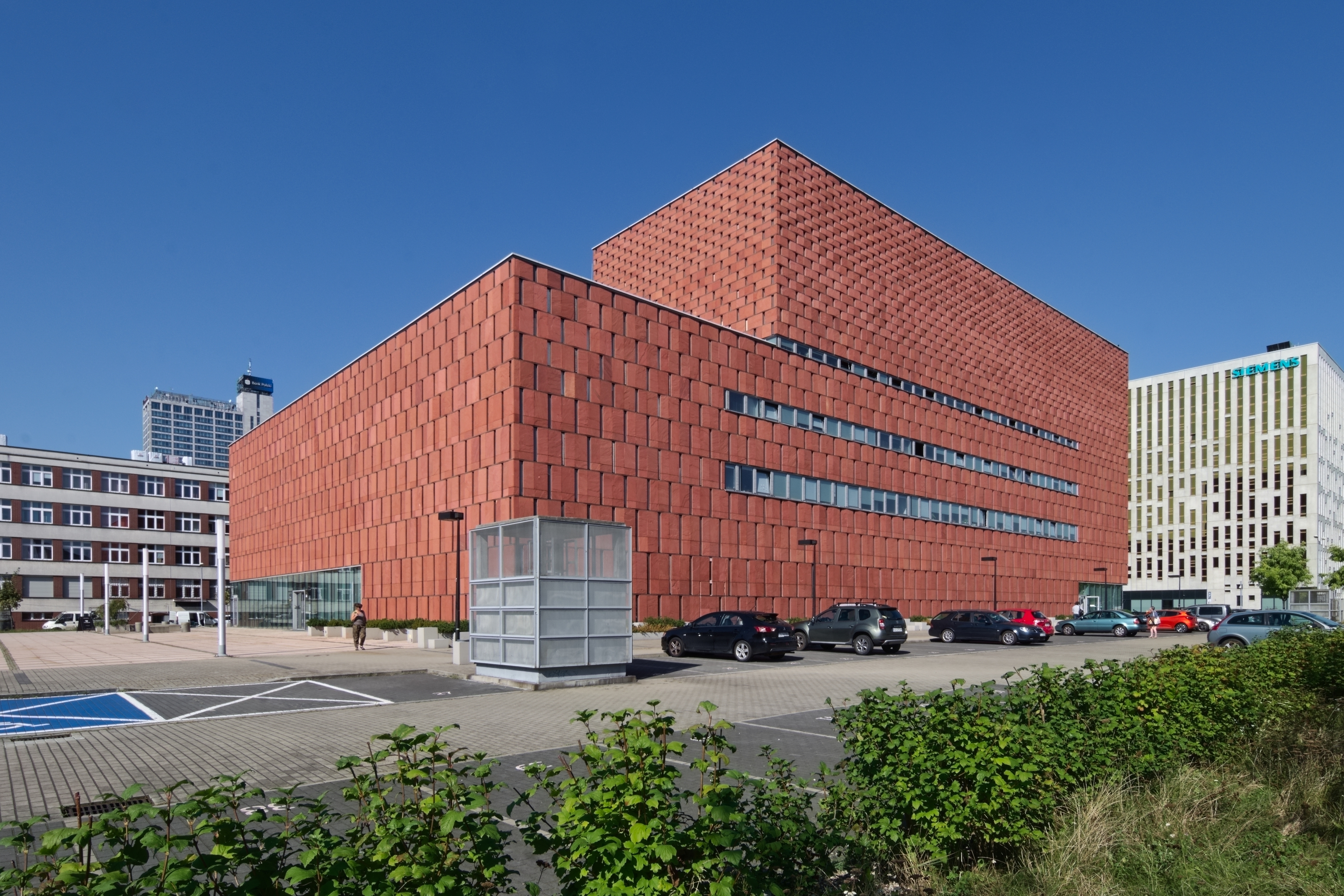
- Location: Katowice
- Type: Academic library
- Established: 12 October 2012

Collection
- Items collected: 1,800,000 total volumes

Other information
- Director: Dariusz Pawelec
- Employees: 100
- Website: www.ciniba.edu.pl

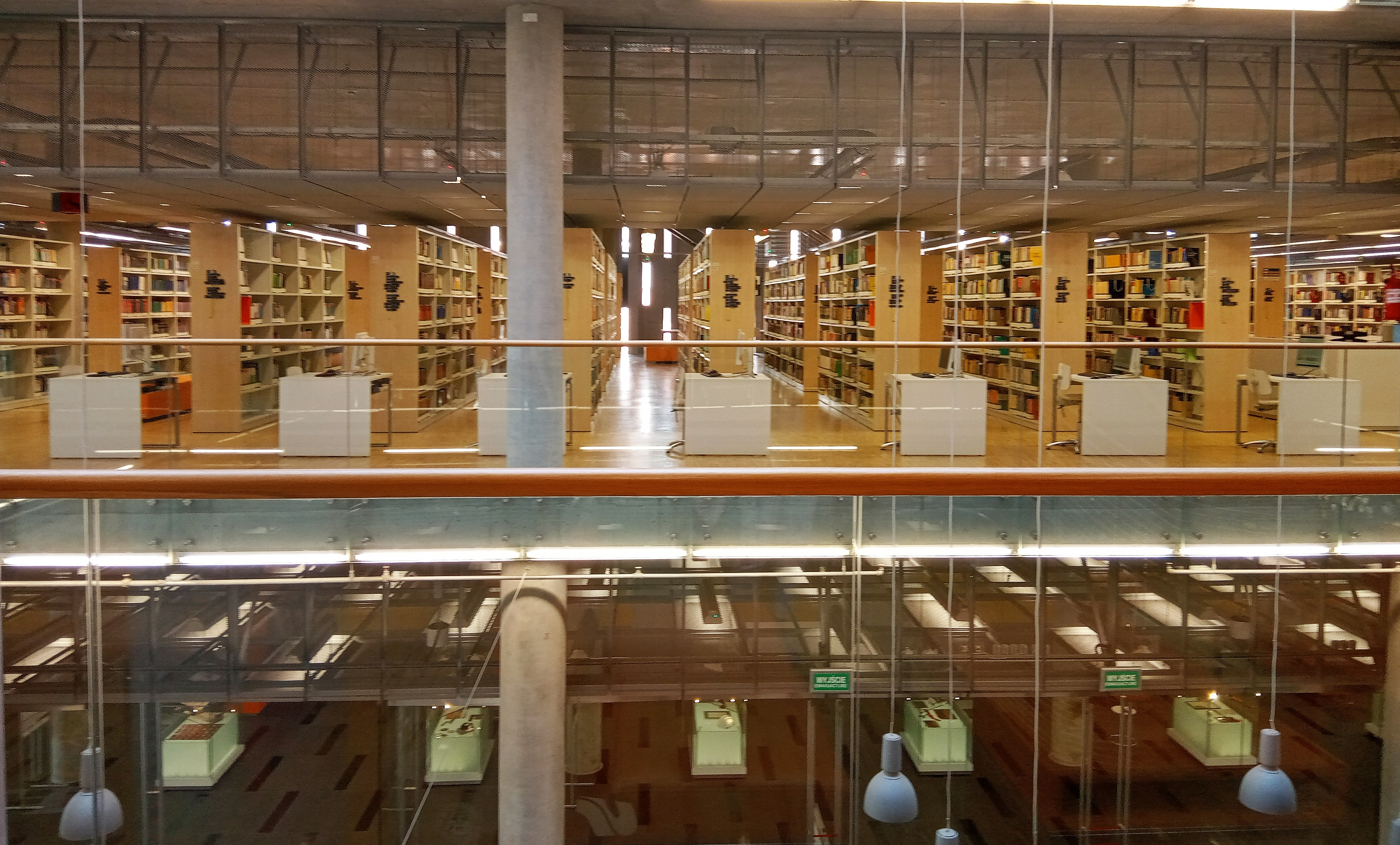
Free access area CINiBA

The Scientific Information Center and Academic Library (CINiBA) is a joint scientific library of two universities in Katowice - the University of Silesia in Katowice and the University of Economics in Katowice. It is located in the heart of the university campus, in the center of the Silesian agglomeration.

== History ==
March 24, 2003 — the two-stage competition of the Association of Polish Architects (SARP) for the creation of the concept of the Scientific Information Center and the Academic Library of the University of Silesia was completed. The winner was a team of architects from Koszalin and Radom.

April 21, 2008 — University of Silesia in Katowice and University of Economics in Katowice formed a consortium.

July 8, 2008 — an agreement was signed between the Silesian Voivodeship and the University of Silesia in Katowice on the co-financing of the Scientific Information Center and Academic Library project within the framework of the Regional Operational Program of the Silesian Voivodeship for 2007-2013. The project leader was the University of Silesia, and the partner was the University of Economics.

August 7, 2009 — signing of a contract for the construction of the Center for Scientific Information and an Academic Library between the University of Silesia, the University of Economics and the general contractor —the consortium "Mostostal Warszawa".

September 27, 2012 — opening of the library for readers.

October 12, 2012 — the official opening of CINiBA.

=== Torkat ===
The site where the CINiBA is located today was the site of Poland's first artificial ice rink Torkat (and the twelfth in Europe) from 1930 to 1973. The construction of the Torkat rink was a condition for Poland being granted the right to host the 1931 Ice Hockey World Championships.

On October 12, 2026, a plaque commemorating the Torkat ice rink was unveiled near the CINiBA building.

== Library Building ==
- Total area: 13 260.49 m2
- Usable area: 12 273.40 m2
- Cubature of the object: 62 560 m3
- Building: 7 floors, 4004 windows
- 1000 people can stay in the building at the same time

== Characteristics ==
=== Mission of the CINiBA ===
The Scientific Information Centre and Academic Library provides access to electronic resources in all fields of knowledge. These are full-text, bibliographic and factographic databases.

=== Open library ===
The CINiBA is open to all readers, and access to its resources is free. The library’s open character is testified not only by free access to national and international publications in a traditional and electronic form, but also professional help from librarians, friendly architecture, the latest technologies and solutions (including self-service devices).

The CINiBA is adapted to meet special needs of people with disabilities. Readers with various types of disfunctions can freely use library resources, using specialized software and computer hardware.

=== Traditional and electronic resources ===
The CINiBA provides scientific collections from all disciplines of knowledge represented in the two universities: the University of Silesia and the University of Economics in Katowice. CINiBA provide access to national and international scientific publications in the traditional and electronic form. Readers in the CINiBA have at their disposal a collection of over 850,000 volumes of books and magazines, enriched by databases available both in the library and remotely anywhere in the Word - by logging into the system.

=== Free access to the collections ===
A significant part of the collections is located in free access areas and is generally available. These are the latest books and selected collections, publications relevant and important to individual scientific disciplines, which researchers and students often reach for. Free access to shelves, the ability to browse books freely, without need to order them, allows free use of resources and guarantees users a large independence - from getting to the right shelf to the final moment of lending a book.
