= Institute of Regional Research of Silesian Library =

- Deputy Director for Regional Research Institute: Professor Ryszard Kaczmarek
- Address: Ligonia 7 street, 40-036 Katowice
- Location: Katowice, Poland
- Website: http://www.ibr.bs.katowice.pl

Institute of Regional Research of Silesian Library (Polish: Instytut Badań Regionalnych Biblioteki Śląskiej), is a department of Silesian Library and it is located in Katowice, Silesian Voivodeship.

== History ==
Silesian Institute was the first center to deal with regional research in Katowice. The institution was established in 1934 by Roman Lutman. Silesian Institute operated until 1949, however, when the Great War started, the activities of institute were pursued in secrecy. In 1957, effort to continue studying the region by the Jacek Koraszewski Silesian Research Institute was initiated. The Institute ceased its activities in 1992. Institute of Regional Research of the Silesian Library was established in 2011 by the Silesian Parliament of the Voivodeship.

In March 2012 Professor Ryszard Kaczmarek was appointed as director of the newly established Institute of Regional Research of the Silesian Library. Professor Kaczmarek was previously director of the Institute of History and headed the Department of Archive and History of Silesia at the Faculty of Social Sciences at the University of Silesia. He was also a prominent researcher at the National Archives in Katowice.

Silesian Library procured and secured the books of previous institutes, which will now serve as the scientific base of the Institute of Regional Research.

== The fundamental purposes of the activities of the Institute ==
- historical, sociological and political science research on ethnic and cultural borderlands (nation states and regions in Europe);
- regional history: comparative studies with other European regions similar in economic structure, as well as in social and cultural history; nation-building processes.
- digitization of cultural heritage in border regions - methods of maintaining and sharing a multilingual and multicultural heritage of border regions;
- regional education as part of civic education: regional education textbooks, bilingual teaching methods, ethnic and religious minorities and their influence on the regional education policy, modalities for implementing the regional education into the curriculum.

== Educational projects ==
1. Encyclopedia of Silesian Voivodeship
  The Encyclopedia will contain materials, which can be used by students and teachers, as well as by people who are keen on the region. Unrestricted Internet access will be provided by the Silesian Digital Library. The advantages are constant data updating and publishing fully digitalized source materials from digital libraries. All entries will be peer reviewed.
2. Regional education: The Course Book
  Institute of Regional Research will create free, interdisciplinary materials for teachers. Firstly, the materials will be created by an academic team; secondly, the teacher’s team will work on the material to make it fully understandable and interesting for the students. The Course Book will be dedicated to both junior high school and high school students.
