= Teacher Training College of Bielsko-Biała =

Coordinates: 49°49′17″N 19°03′41″E

Teacher Training College
- Kolegium Nauczycielskie
- Established: 1991
- Academic staff: about 150
- Students: about 1500
- Address: ul.Krakowska 301, 43-300, Bielsko-Biała, Poland
- Website: kn.edu.pl

The Teacher Training College of Bielsko-Biała (Kolegium Nauczycielskie w Bielsku-Białej) was an educational institution in Poland. It was established in 1991 continuing more than century-old traditions of teacher training in the city and region. It was the largest teacher training college in the country. The college was closed down on September 30, 2015.

The college had five specialities:

- Polish language, science information and librarianship
- early education
- mathematics with informatics
- special education - rehabilitation pedagogy with elements of prevention
- special education - oligophrenopedagogy

All the education was done under the academic supervision of well-known universities:

- Jagiellonian University in Kraków (Polish: Uniwersytet Jagielloński)
- Pedagogical Academy in Kraków (Polish: Akademia Pedagogiczna w Krakowie)
- University of Silesia in Katowice (Polish: Uniwersytet Śląski)
- Jan Dlugosz Academy in Czestochowa (Polish: Akademia im. Jana Długosza w Częstochowie)

Graduates were granted a college graduation diploma and BA (licencjat) degree awarded by either of the supervising universities. This allowed them to continue their MA studies there.

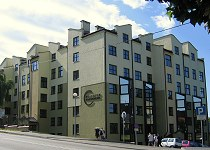
Building A

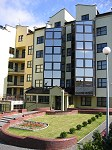
Students hostel

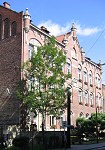
Building B

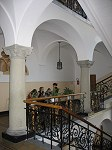
Building B inside

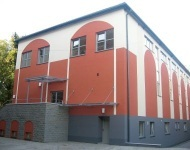
Sports hall
