= Grzegorz Lach =

Polish historian

Grzegorz Lach (born 1967) is a Polish historian. He finished history at Silesian University in Katowice, where in 2007 he gained a Ph.D. His research area is ancient Greece and he is a well-known author of books about this topic.

== Books ==
- 2007 - Wyprawa sycylijska 415-413 p.n.e.
- 2008 - Sztuka wojenna starożytnej Grecji. Od zakończenia wojen perskich do wojny korynckiej
- 2010 - Salamina-Plateje 480-479 p.n.e.
- 2011 - Alkibiades. Wódz i polityk
- 2012 - Wojny diadochów 323-281 p.n.e.
- 2014 - Ipsos 301 p.n.e.
