= Jan Drabina =

Polish historian (born 1939)

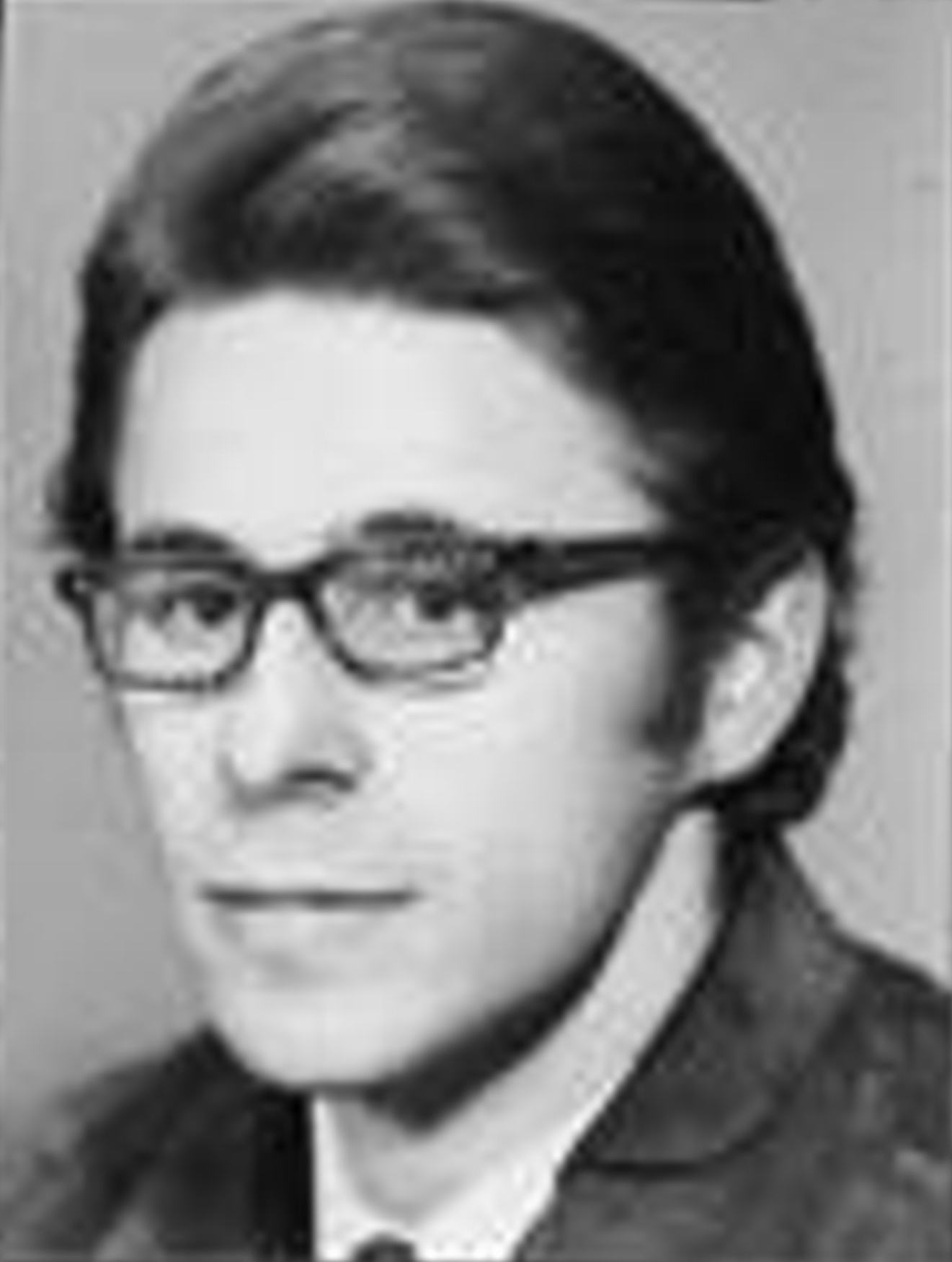
- Jan Drabina, before 1989
- Born: 1939 (age 86–87); Cieszyn, Poland
- Education: Jagiellonian University
- Occupation: Historian
- Title: Prof. Dr. Hab.

Jan Drabina (born 1939, in Cieszyn) is a Polish historian, professor at the Jagiellonian University.

He graduated from the Jagiellonian University in 1964 and gained a Ph.D. from the University of Silesia in 1969. In 1993 Drabina gained the title of professor. He is an honorary citizen of Bytom.

== Works ==
- "Kontakty Wrocławia z Rzymem w latach 1409-1517", Wrocław 1981
- "Idee koncyliaryzmu na Śląsku", Kraków 1984
- "Rola argumentacji religijnej w walce politycznej w późnośredniowiecznym Wrocławiu", Kraków 1984
- "Religie na ziemiach Polski i Litwy w średniowieczu", Kraków 1989
- "Życie codzienne w miastach śląskich XIV i XV wieku", Opole 1991
- "Historia Gliwic" (ed.), Gliwice 1995
- "Historia Chorzowa", Chorzów 1998
- "Historia Tarnowskich Gór" (ed.), tarnowskie Góry 2000
- "Historia Bytomia 1254-2000", Bytom 2000
- "Kontakty papiestwa z Polską w latach Schizmy Zachodniej 1378-1415", Kraków 2003
- "Górny Śląsk"
- "Philosophical Problems in the Religions of the East"
- "Wierzenia, Religie, Wspolnoty Wyznaniowe W Sredniowiecznej Polsce I Na Litwie I Ich Koegzystencja"
- "Bytom, Na Starych Planach I Poczto Wkach"
- "Chrzescijanstwo Antyczne"
- "Kontakty Wrocławia z Rzymem w latach 1409-1517"
- "Historia miast śląskich w średniowieczu"
- "Religie a Wojna I Terroryzm"
- "Eschatologia W Religiach, Kulturach I Systemach Myslowych"
- "Prawosawie"
- "Koscioy Wschodnie"
- "Cmentarze Bytomskie: Od Sredniowiecza Do Wspoczesnosci"
- "Historia Chorzowa: Od Sredniowiecza Do 1868 Roku"
- "Religie starożytnego Bliskiego Wschodu"
