= Ruiner (video game) =

2017 video game

- Developer: Reikon Games
- Publisher: Devolver Digital
- Directors: Jakub Styliński; Benedykt Szneider
- Designers: Jakub Styliński; Maciej Mach
- Programmer: Marek Roefler
- Artist: Benedykt Szneider
- Writers: Magdalena Tomkowicz; Benedykt Szneider
- Composer: Various (Note: Zamilska, Susumu Hirasawa, Sidewalks & Skeletons, Memotone, Antigone & Francois X, DJ Alina, and Orion GmbH are all credited for music.)
- Engine: Unreal Engine 4
- Platforms: Linux; Microsoft Windows; PlayStation 4; Xbox One; Nintendo Switch
- Release: Linux, Windows, PlayStation 4, Xbox One; 26 September 2017; Nintendo Switch; 18 June 2020
- Genre: Twin-stick shooter
- Mode: Single-player

Ruiner is a twin-stick shooter video game developed by Polish studio Reikon Games and published by Devolver Digital. It was released for Linux, Microsoft Windows, PlayStation 4, and Xbox One on 26 September 2017 and for Nintendo Switch on 18 June 2020. It is the first game to be developed by Reikon Games.

== Gameplay ==
Ruiner is a shoot 'em up played from an isometric perspective. The game takes place in 2091 and is set in a cyberpunk metropolis known as Rengkok. The player takes control of a silent, masked protagonist who attempts to rescue their kidnapped brother from a failing conglomerate, known as Heaven, that controls Rengkok.

== Plot ==
Ruiner takes place in 2091 in Rengkok and its surrounding facilities, owned by Heaven, a conglomerate led by a man referred to in-game as the Boss. Initially the player character, a silent protagonist dubbed "Puppy" by another character, is being led by a rogue hacker named Wizard to assassinate the Boss. Before he reaches the Boss's office, the signal from Wizard to the protagonist is overridden by another hacker known only as Her. Her explains to Puppy that Wizard was contracted by another group and that his brother has been kidnapped, and urges him to track Wizard down. She leads him to a territory filled with Creeps, a group of psychotic gangsters led by a swordsman named Nerve. After fighting his way through the Creeps' territory, Nerve challenges Puppy to a duel and is defeated in battle. Earning the Creeps' leadership, they find Wizard and hack into his brain, killing him in the process and leading them to the Hanza Compound, a factory that manufactures machine parts. Her tracks Puppy's brother down with a signal leading to him.

They are greeted by armed guards and the angry AI that manages the compound, Mother. Puppy fights his way through the Hanza facility and fights against mercenaries hired by TrafficKing, a cyborg in the form of a UFO-like device piloted by a human head, who runs the facility alongside Mother and presumably contracted Wizard. As he follows the signal that leads to his brother, Puppy battles Mother and then TrafficKing, hacking his brain to reveal where his brother is being taken; the Imagination Farms, which use human beings as hosts to lend brainpower for running Virtuality, a virtual reality device that Heaven manufactures and sells to civilians. As TrafficKing has clearance for entering these areas, Puppy and Her kidnap him to gain access to the farms.

Puppy, led by Her and accompanied by the tamed TrafficKing, scour the Imagination Farms for his brother's signal, and are confronted by Geminus, a dual-personality cyborg that presents itself as two twin sisters that act as host to Mother. TrafficKing has been working for Geminus and it has been established that they were using Wizard to form a coup to overthrow the Boss and control Heaven. TrafficKing dies after begrudgingly helping Puppy through overheated obstacles, burning to death. Puppy confronts Geminus but is attacked by the resurrected TrafficKing, now controlling a humanoid cyborg body. Puppy kills him and battles Geminus, killing both sisters and finally finding the mechanical pod that holds his brother.

Upon approaching it, a cutscene showing two small children leaving the facility plays, and the game cuts back to Heaven, where Puppy is restrained in a jumpsuit as two guards and the Boss, who wears a mask identical to Puppy's, approach him. The Boss reveals that Puppy was only being used for spare parts due to their biological similarity, and that he was hacked by Wizard as he could potentially be anywhere the Boss could be. Her is an independent hacker contracted by the Boss to hack Puppy and make him believe he had a brother who was kidnapped, thus leading him back to the Boss while also exterminating the people who attempted to overthrow him. The Boss remarks that he will keep Puppy closer to him, when Her makes a reappearance and reveals that she is not human and has been tricking the Boss since their agreement; she has led Puppy to Heaven to kill the Boss. Her advises Puppy to 'meet her where heaven falls' if he survives. He escapes his restraints and kills many of the Boss's guards before finally approaching the Boss himself, and, depending on a dialogue prompt, will either bludgeon him with his weapon or hack his brain. The ending shows Puppy riding away on his motorcycle to an unknown destination.

== Development and release ==
Ruiner was the first game to be developed by Polish indie game studio Reikon Games, with Devolver Digital funding and publishing the game. The game was released for Linux, PlayStation 4, Microsoft Windows, Xbox One on 26 September 2017. A Nintendo Switch version was released on June 18, 2020.

== Reception ==
Reception

Aggregate score
Aggregator	Score
Metacritic	(PC) 75/100 (PS4) 71/100 (XONE) 77/100 (NS) 82/100

Review scores
Publication	Score
Game Informer	7/10
GameSpot	8/10
GamesRadar+	4/5
Hardcore Gamer	4/5
IGN	6/10
PC Gamer (US)	84/100
Polygon	6/10

Critical reception towards Ruiner was generally positive. Omri Pettite of PC Gamer stated that "Ruiner is gorgeous, a sensory feast inspired by the works of cyberpunk's 1980s heyday, in which a silent, masked protagonist travels through the nightscapes and industrial jungles of a grit-tech 2091. Underneath, a thumping top-down action game delivers sword-sharp combat, the familiarity of its design offset by the constant urge to simply stand still and drink everything in."

== Film adaptation ==
On December 17, 2020, EuropaCorp announced their acquisition of rights to produce a television adaptation of the game. As of 2025, the project had not materialized.

On August 20, 2024, it was announced that Universal Pictures had acquired the rights to develop a film adaptation of the game with Wes Ball directing and Michael Arlen Ross writing the screenplay. The film will be produced by Kelly McCormick and David Leitch of 87North Productions alongside Ball and Joe Hartwick Jr. of Oddball Entertainment and Dmitri M. Johnson and Michael Lawrence Goldberg of Story Kitchen. Reikon Games will serve as executive producers, with Ryan Jones and Jacqueline Garell overseeing the project on behalf of the studio.

== Sequel ==
On March 5, 2026, Ruiner 2 was announced with addition to being an action-driven role-playing game and having co-op multiplayer with up to three players.
