= Eugenia Mandal =

Polish social psychologist (1956 or 1957 – 2025)

Eugenia Mandal (1956 or 1957 – 11 July 2025) was a Polish social psychologist, holder of a postdoctoral degree in Psychology (Ph.D. degree: 1990, University of Silesia; postdoctoral degree: 2000, Polish Academy of Sciences - Department of Psychology). She was a professor in the Department of Psychology at the University of Silesia, Poland.

She was also a supervisor of the Department of Social and Environmental Psychology.

Mandal was an author of numerous researches in the field of gender psychology: femininity and masculinity, gender stereotypes, gender differences psychology, and she was also an author of such issues like close relationships, social influence, authority, autopresentation, attractiveness and body image. She was an author of numerous books and articles. She has participated in creating two reports about women and men in Poland for World Bank.

Mandal died on 11 July 2025, at the age of 68.

== Selected publications ==
=== Books ===
- Podmiotowe i interpersonalne konsekwencje stereotypów związanych z płcią [Subjective and interpersonal consequences of the stereotypes related to gender]. Katowice: Wydawnictwo Uniwersytetu Śląskiego (2000) ISBN 83-226-0966-3
- Kobiecość i męskość. Popularne opinie a badania naukowe [Femininity and masculinity. Popular opinions and scientific researches]. Warszawa: Wydawnictwo Akademickie Żak (2003) ISBN 83-89501-03-1
- Podmiotowe i interpersonalne konsekwencje stereotypów związanych z płcią [Subjective and interpersonal consequences of the stereotypes related to gender. Revised edition]. Wydanie drugie zmienione. Katowice: Wydawnictwo Uniwersytetu Śląskiego (2004) ISBN 83-226-1385-7
- Miłość, władza i manipulacja w bliskich związkach [Love, authority and manipulation in close relationships]. Warszawa: Wydawnictwo Naukowe PWN (2008) ISBN 978-83-01-15484-4

=== Scientific reports ===
- Gender and Economic Opportunities in Poland. Document of the World Bank. Report No 29205-POL, 15 March 2004. The World Bank, Warsaw Office, Edition I, Warsaw (2004) ISBN 83-88911-02-3
- Growth, Employment and Living Standards in Poland. Document of the World Bank. Report No. 28233-POL, 22 March 2004. The World Bank, Warsaw Office, Edition I, Warsaw (2004) ISBN 83-89188-27-9

=== Scientific editor ===
- Współczesne problemy socjalizacji [Contemporary problems of socialization]. Katowice: Wydawnictwo Uniwersytetu Śląskiego (1995, współredakcja Stefańska-Klar R.) ISSN 0239-6432
- Tożsamość społeczno-kulturowa płci [Social-cultural identity of gender]. Opole: Wydawnictwo Uniwersytetu Opolskiego. (2005, współredakcja Barska A.) ISBN 83-7395-118-0
- W kręgu gender [In gender circle]. Katowice: Wydawnictwo Uniwersytetu Śląskiego.(2007). ISBN 978-83-226-1610-9
