= Anita Gargas =

Polish investigative journalist and presenter

Anita Gargas Wojciechowska
- Born: 11 January 1964 (age 62); Katowice, Poland
- Education: University of Silesia in Katowice
- Occupation: Journalist
- Known for: Investigative journalism
- Awards: Knight's Cross of the Order of Polonia Restituta

Anita Gargas Wojciechowska (born 11 January 1964) is a Polish journalist specialising in investigative journalism and a mathematician by education. She is a journalist of the weekly Gazeta Polska and the daily Gazeta Polska Codziennie, where she is the head of the investigative section. From 1 August 2006 to 19 February 2010, she was a deputy director of the news desk and the vice-director for journalism at TVP1, and the author of the programme Misja specjalna (Special Mission).

== Life ==
Gargas was born and raised in Katowice. She graduated in mathematics from the University of Silesia in Katowice. During her studies, she was a member of the Independent Students' Association and Fighting Solidarity. She was also published in the underground NZS periodical, Bez Retuszu, and at the end of the 1980s in another underground periodical, Przegląd Wiadomości Agencyjnych (Agency News Review).

After 1989, Gargas undertook postgraduate studies at the Faculty of Journalism and in 1991 began work as an intern and then as a full-time journalist in the political section of Tygodnik Solidarność. During that time she took up investigative journalism, writing reports and investigative texts about members of the party nomenklatura of the Polish United Workers' Party. In 1991, together with Maciej Wojciechowski, she published a book entitled Partie polityczne w Polsce (Political Parties in Poland). In the same year, she left Tygodnik Solidarność and moved to the new daily Nowy Świat, created by Piotr Wierzbicki. Due to the political conflict in May 1992, under Jan Olszewski's government, both were dismissed from their posts.

== Publishing Macierewicz's List ==
In 1993, Wierzbicki founded the monthly (transformed into a weekly) Gazeta Polska, which Gargas joined. In June 1993, Gargas published the then secret Macierewicz's List. This was a list of 64 members of the polish Sejm, the lower house of the Polish government who were secretly collaborating with the Ministry of Public Security and the Internal Military Service. In 1998, Gargas became a member of the Polish Press Agency programme board. In her work, she continued to develop as an investigative journalist, documenting scandals and crimes connected with the activities of state power, the former communist nomenklatura, and the former secret services. She left Gazeta Polska in 2005. At that time Piotr Wierzbicki ceased to be the editor-in-chief and was replaced by Tomasz Sakiewicz.

== Special Mission ==
She started working for the Ozon weekly. At the same time, she became the editor of a programme called Misja specjalna (Special mission), initiated explicitly by the Ozon stations directors, due to the lack of investigative journalism programmes at the station. The order to prepare the new programme was given to Andrzej Godlewski, who invited Anita Gargas to run the programme. The first episode appeared on air in January 2005 and was broadcast for several months, until the election campaign of 2005.

In May 2006, Telewizja Polska (TVP) broadcast a film by Gargas entitled Prezydentowa bez barier (President without barriers) about Jolanta Kwaśniewska, the spouse of the President of the Republic of Poland Aleksander Kwaśniewski, the first lady of Poland in 1995–2005. The content of the report referred to the ambiguities associated with the foundation run by Kwaśniewska, the charity foundation Porozumienie bez barier (Understanding Without Barriers). As a result, Kwaśniewska filed a complaint with the Krajowa Rada Radiofonii i Telewizji (National Broadcasting Council). The Council of Media Ethics criticised Gargas for passing over the truth and mixing information with commentary. Despite this, the film was nominated for a media award named after Andrzej Woyciechowski.

The programme Misja specjalna was broadcast again in September 2006, after it was brought back on air by the president of TVP, Bronisław Wildstein. Gargas became the main editor of the programme. At the same time she was appointed deputy head of the journalism department, 2007 promoted to head, and in 2009 she was appointed deputy director of TVP1. Her reports concerned scandals and pathologies in power and economy, such as connections of the Speaker of the Sejm Józef Oleksy and his family with fuel companies, and the lack of vetting in Poland. In one of the programmes a recording of a conversation between historian Adam Michnik and businessman Aleksander Gudzowaty was played, describing how the editor of Gazeta Wyborcza Michnik, promised Gudzowaty, an oligarch, not to write about him in unflattering terms, essentially subverting his own journalists. The programme was broadcast until March 2009, when it was removed from the schedule. Gargas was dismissed from the position of head of the Publicistic Department of TVP1 by the then acting president of TVP, Piotr Farfał. In March 2009, a group of people wrote an open letter in her defence, considering her dismissal as a restriction of freedom of speech. Gargas was the originator of the TV programme "The Big History Test". After her dismissal, she accused public television of intellectual copyright theft in connection with the continuation of the programme by TVP.

In 2007, Gargas began a trial with film producer Maciej Strzembosz, who suggested on an internet blog that she was working in a classified position in the WSI. Gargas won the trial because the producer failed to provide evidence for his accusations.

On 3 February 2010, the Misja specjalna programme returned to TVP1. In the same month, Gargas was dismissed by the board of TVP, from the position of deputy director of TVP1, without an officially stated reason. After 10 April 2010, Misja specjalna's reports repeatedly concerned the investigation of the Smolensk air disaster. The programme was broadcast until 19 October 2010, and then was removed from the schedule by the head of TVP1, Iwona Schymalla (together with the programme Bronisław Wildstein presents (Bronisław Wildstein presents).

== Documentary maker ==
Later on in her career in 2011, Gargas made documentaries about the tragedy of 10 April 2010, the Smolensk air disaster. She was the author of the first investigative documentary film devoted to the Smolensk catastrophe, entitled 10.04.10, devoted to the explanation of the Smolensk crash, which was published as a supplement to Gazeta Polska on 6 April 2011. In mid-January 2013, her next investigative film on the event, entitled Anatomia upadku (Anatomy of a fall), was premiered, and in late March and early April 2014, a continuation of this production entitled Anatomia upadku 2 (Anatomy of a fall 2) was produced. On 13 June 2016, a film entitled W imię honoru (In the Name of Honour) premiered, in which Generals Andrzej Błasik, Andrzej Karweta and Bronisław Kwiatkowski were portrayed in the statements of their spouses.

In 2012, Anita Gargas ended a lawsuit filed by Ryszard Grobelny, Mayor of Poznań, accusing her in a private indictment of defaming the public in one of the episodes of the Special Mission. In January 2012, the court discontinued the case, finding that the journalist had prepared the material in a reliable manner, adhering to the principles of objective journalism, and that there were no prerequisites for a criminal offence.

In January 2013, she sat on the supervisory board of Independent Television S.A., in the role of manager of the TV channel Republic Television. From May 2013 to August 2016 she hosted the investigative programme Zadanie specjalne (Special Task) on the station. On 1 July 2013, she became a member of the supervisory board of Telewizja Republika S.A., managing the Telewizja Republika station. From September 2014 to August 2016, she served as deputy editor-in-chief of Telewizja Republika to Tomasz Terlikowski.

From September 2016, she has hosted Anita Gargas' Investigative Magazine on TVP1.

== Bibliography ==
- Gargas, Anita; Wojciechowski, Maciej (1991). Partie polityczne w Polsce (in Polish) (Wyd. 1 ed.). Gdansk: Krajowa Agencja Wydawn. ISBN 9788303034656. OCLC 26645655.

== Awards and honours ==
- On 19 March 2010, Gargas was awarded the Knight's Cross of the Order of Polonia Restituta by Lech Kaczyński, President of the Republic of Poland, for her outstanding contribution to the democratic changes in Poland and for her achievements in her professional and social work undertaken for the benefit of the country.
- In 2012, she was awarded the Freedom of Speech Award for 2011, awarded by the Association of Polish Journalists for courage and uncompromising attitude in finding the truth about the Smolensk catastrophe. The prize was 20,000 zloty.
- On 30 January 2014, Gargas was awarded the Watergate Award by the Association of Polish Journalists for the 2012 documentary film Anatomy of a Fall.
- On 28 January 2016, together with Cezary Gmyz, Gargas received an honorary mention as part of the "Watergate Prize" for 2015, awarded by the Association of Polish Journalists for the material Taśmy trzeciej władzy - sędziowskie układy (Tapes of the Third Power - Judges' Arrangements), broadcast on 10 December 2014 in the programme Special Task on Republic Television.

== Documentaries ==
- 10.04.10 (2011)
- Anatomia upadku (2012)
- Anatomia upadku 2 (2014)
- W imię honoru (2016)
