= Tomasz Sapota =

Polish classical philologist

- Born: Tomasz Wojciech Sapota
- Citizenship: Polish
- Education: Jagiellonian University
- Occupation: classical philologist

Tomasz Sapota (born 31 March 1970, Katowice) is a Polish classical philologist, Latinist and literary scholar, professor at the University of Silesia in Katowice, in 2016–2019 vice-dean for student affairs and education at the Faculty of Philology of the University of Silesia.

== Life and work ==
In 1994, he graduated from the Faculty of Classical Philology at the Jagiellonian University. In 1999, at the University of Silesia in Katowice, he obtained a doctoral degree in the humanities in the field of literary studies, on the basis of the dissertation Magic and Religion in the Work of Lucius Apuleius of Madaura. Oriental influences in Roman culture in the 2nd century CE supervised by Jerzy Styka. In 2010, at the same university, he obtained his habilitation, equivalent with tenure, in the discipline of literary studies on the basis of the dissertation Juwenalis.

In the years 2013–2016 he was the head of doctoral studies at the Faculty of Philology of the University of Silesia in Katowice, in 2016–2019 he was the vice-dean for student affairs and education at the Faculty of Philology at the University of Silesia, and in the years 2019–2020 he was the coordinator of the area of humanities, art and theology at the University of Silesia Doctoral School.

His research interests focus on Roman literature, especially during the imperial period. He published as an author or co-author several monographs, translations or monographic studies of ancient texts (including Seneca the Younger and Macrobius) and a number of articles in academic journals, he was the editor of one collective publication. He collaborated as a reviewer with the magazine Classica Cracoviensia and is a member of the editorial board of the Meluzyna journal.

He was a supervisor in one doctoral thesis.

In June 2020, he signed a solidarity letter due to the police interrogation of students of the University of Silesia, who filed a disciplinary complaint against the lecturer Ewa Budzyńska, who compared contraception to abortion during the lectures. In June 2021, he wrote a letter of solidarity with a student of the Jagiellonian University, who was disciplined by the Jagiellonian University for spitting on the monuments of Zygmunt Szendzielarz and Józef Franczak, both responsible for war crimes.
