= Józef Ciągwa =

Polish lawyer

- Born: 19 March 1939 (age 87); Jurgów
- Awards: Order of Polonia Restituta Order of the White Double Cross
- Scientific career
- Fields: Law

Józef Ciągwa, slov. Jozef Čongva (born March 19, 1939, in Jurgów) – Polish lawyer of Slovak origin, translator, lecturer at University of Silesia in Katowice, professor of jurisprudence and president of the management board of Slovaks in Poland Association.

== Biography ==
He specialises in history of political and law doctrines, history of Poland and Polish law as well as history of Polish political and economic system. Having worked at many different Universities of southern Poland, he currently only lectures at University of Silesia in Katowice.

In 1983 he joined Social and Cultural Association of Czechs and Slovaks in Poland. During parliament elections in 1991 he was running for member of Parliament from electoral list of Electoral Block of National Minorities in Nowy Sącz Voivodeship. Since 1995 he is a leader of Slovaks in Poland Association. Until the end of 2012 he was a member of Joint Commission of Government and National and Ethnical Minorities on Association's behalf as a representative of Slovak society. He speaks Slovak and Hungarian as well as their local dialects fluently.

He is a licensed Tatra Mountains guide. Since 1992 he also is a state-registered translator for Czech and Slovak language.

== Awards ==
On January 8, 2009, in Bratislava he received Second Class Order of the White Double Cross (Rad Bieleho dvojkríža II. triedy) form the President of Slovakia, Ivan Gašparovič so as to honor his extraordinary merits for Slovak Republic, especially for his academic and cultural activities.

On November 15, 2013, he received Knight's Cross of Order of Polonia Restituta (Krzyż Kawalerski Orderu Odrodzenia Polski) for outstanding merits in work for national and ethnic minorities and academic work.

== Festschrift ==
In 2009, in order to celebrate his 70th birthsday anniversary, a festschrift was published. It's titled Państwo, prawo, społeczeństwo w dziejach Europy Środkowej. Księga jubileuszowa dedykowana profesorowi Józefowi Ciągwie w siedemdziesięciolecie urodzin, edited by Adam Lityński, Katowice: Wydawnictwo Uniwersytetu Śląskiego, 2009 ISBN 978-83-7490-261-8.

== Notable publications ==
- Wpływ centralnych organów Drugiej Rzeczypospolitej na ustawodawstwo śląskie w latach 1922–1939, 1979
- Autonomia Śląska: (1922–1939), 1988
- Immunitet parlamentarny posłów Sejmu Śląskiego w latach 1922–1939: regulacja prawna i praktyka, 1992
- Słowacy w Powstaniu Warszawskim. Wybór źródeł, Towarzystwo Słowaków w Polsce, Cracow 1994, ISBN 83-89707-33-0
- Dzieje i współczesność Jurgowa. Dejiny a súčasnosť Jurgova: 1546–1996, 1996
- Rada Narodowa Republiki Słowackiej, Kancelaria Sejmu. Biuro Informacyjne, 1998
