= Natalia Zamilska =

Polish musician (born 1989)

Zamilska
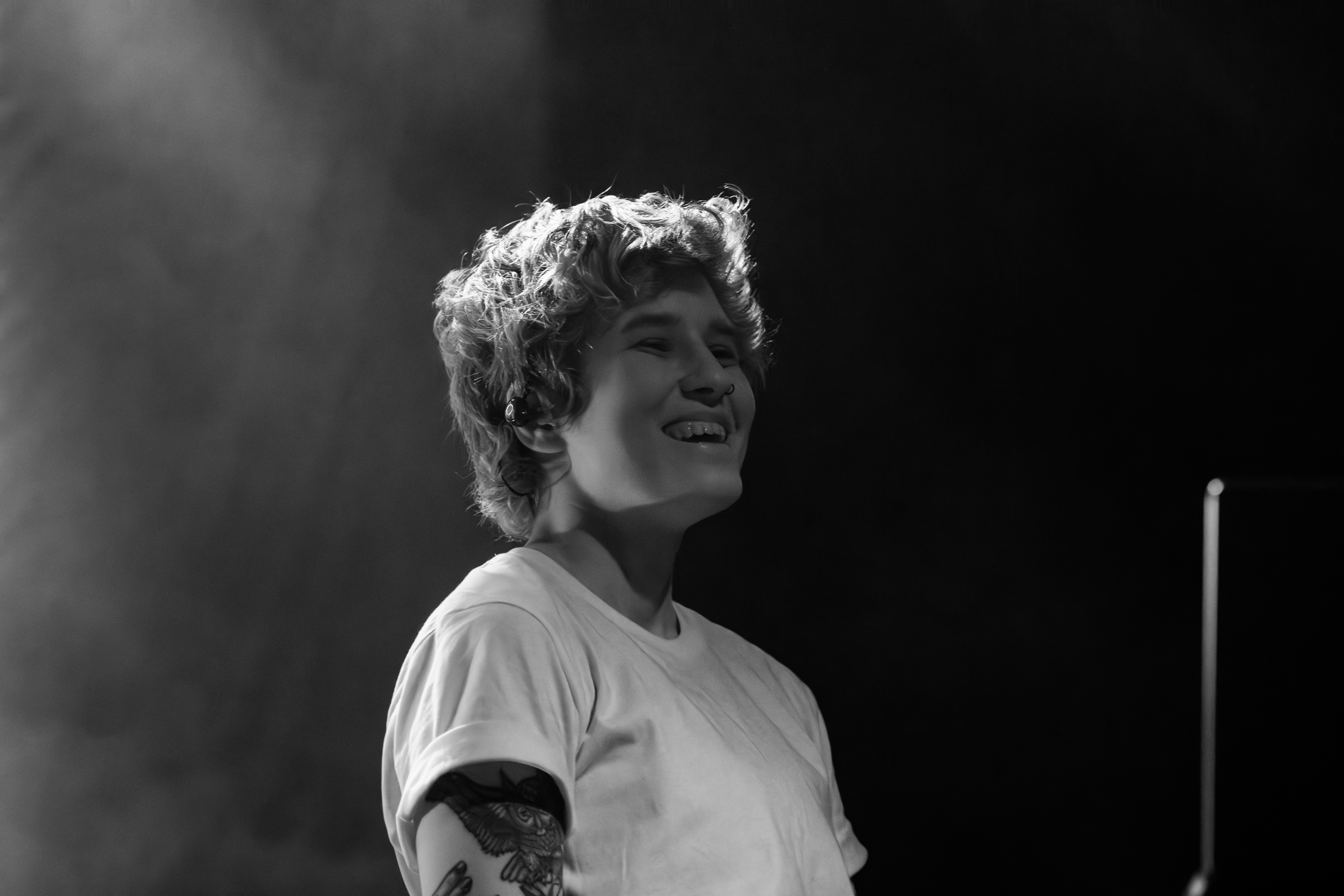
- Zamilska, 2024

Background information
- Born: Natalia Zamilska; 1989 (age 36–37); Zawiercie
- Genres: Electronic, Industrial, World, Techno
- Years active: 2012–present
- Label: Untuned Records
- Website: zamilska.com

Natalia Zamilska, known professionally as Zamilska (born 1989 in Zawiercie) is a Polish creator, composer, radio presenter and producer of electronic music.

== Life ==
Natalia Zamilska was born in 1989 in Zawiercie. She graduated from Uniwersytet Śląski in Cieszyn with a degree in social and cultural animation. She cooperated with a local Foundation of Audiovisual Culture "Strefa Szarej", by leading workshops in electronic music production and working for Galeria Szara. After university she moved to Katowice where she concentrated on making music. In 2014, she moved to Warsaw.

In 2014, she debuted with an album Untune, which ranked 12 in the yearly toplist of The Quietus. Her music was used on a Dior fashion show. Her second album, an OST to the game Ruiner, was nominated in the Electronic Album Of The Year category of Fryderyki 2017 and Digital Dragons 2018 award for the best game soundtrack. Her work was recommended by Iggy Pop and Nine Inch Nails. In 2019, she released a LP Uncovered.

Zamilska also produces records. The track "Dzielne kobiety" (Brave women) by Paulina Przybysz produced by Zamilska was a part of an album "Chodź tu" (Come here) which won a Fryderyk in 2017. She remixed, among others, Rita Pax, The Dumplings, Natalia Fiedorczuk, Quebonafide and Maria Peszek.

In the years 2017–2019, she was a host of a programme "Nocny TransPort" in national radio station Czwórka.

In 2016, she came out in an interview with Wysokie Obcasy, where she mentioned having a girlfriend.

== Discography ==
LPs

- 2014 – Untune
- 2017 – Ruiner Official Soundtrack [game soundtrack]
- 2019 – Uncovered
- 2023 – Mother's Day [film soundtrack]
- 2024 – United Kingdom Of Anxiety

EPs

- 2016 – UNDONE

Singles

- 2014 – Quarrel
- 2014 – Quarrel II (Internal Defense)
- 2016 – Closer
- 2018 – Jeśli wiesz co chcę powiedzieć [remixes]; Nosowska & Zamilska
- 2019 – Hollow
- 2020 - Prologue Live
- 2020 - Fragile
- 2022 - Duel 35 Chamber Orchestra
- 2023 - Better Off w/Huskie
- 2023 - Deadfall
- 2024 - No Gods w/Hostia

== Awards and nominations ==
=== Berlin Music Video Awards ===
The Berlin Music Video Awards is an international festival that promotes the art of music videos.

Year	Nominated work	Award	Result	Ref.
2025	"Odyssey"	Best Performer	Nominated	
