= Tadeusz J. Zieliński =

Polish lawyer and Protestant theologian

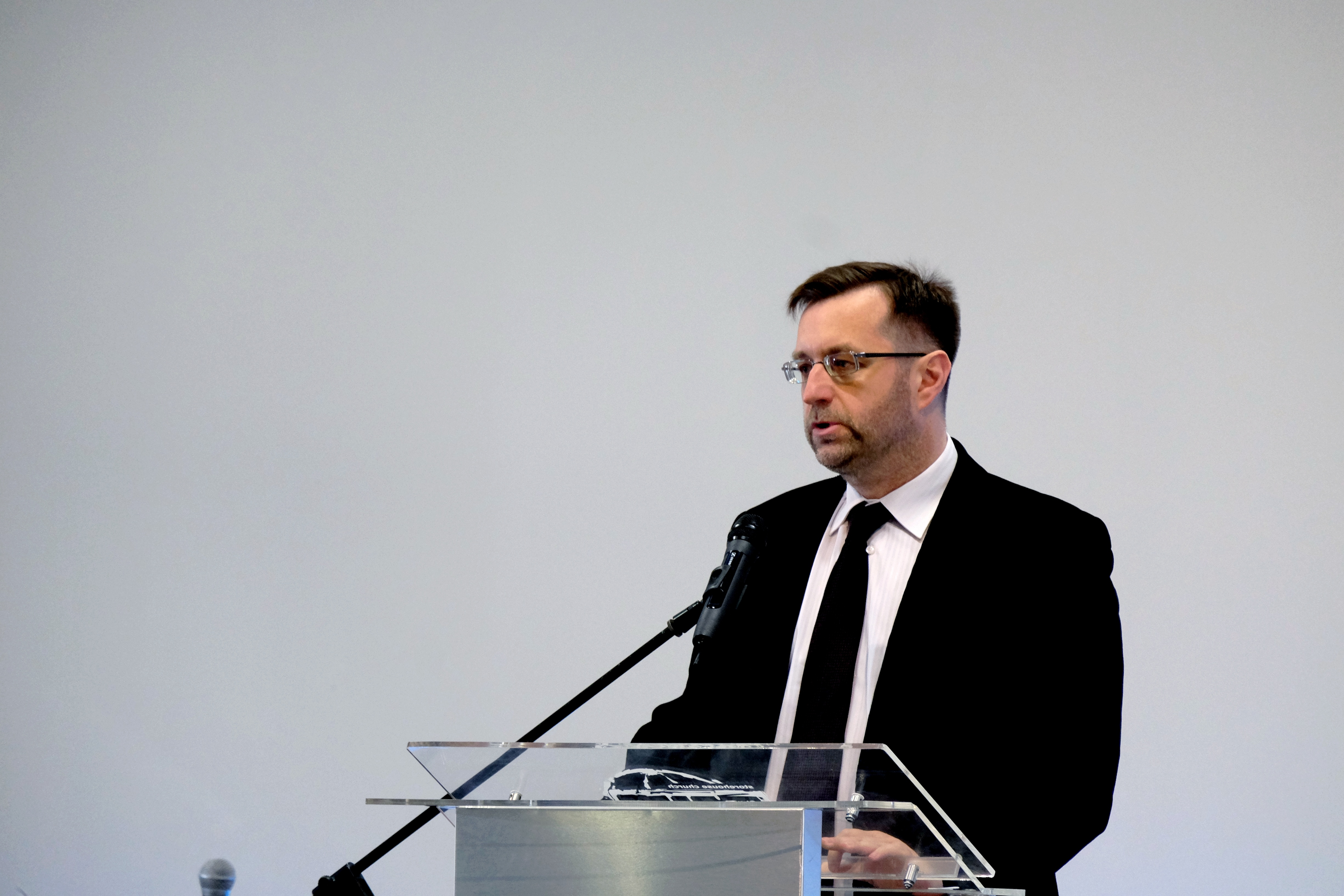
- Zieliński in 2016

Member of the Sejm (1993-2001)

Prof. dr hab.

Personal details
- Born: 1966 (age 59–60) Katowice, Polish People's Republic
- Party: Freedom Union (Poland)
- Occupation: lawyer, theologian, academician

Tadeusz Jacek Zieliński (born 1966 in Katowice) is a Polish lawyer and Protestant theologian, professor of theological sciences and Juris Doctor. Member of Polish Parliament (1993-2001) and president of Polish Association of Church-State Law (2008-2016). Since 2016 deputy rector of the Christian Academy of Theology in Warsaw.

== Biography ==
Tadeusz Jacek Zieliński graduated from the University of Silesia in Katowice where he received M.A. degree in Law. He obtained Doctorate and Habilitation in Protestant theology at the Christian Academy of Theology in Warsaw. At the Law and Administration Faculty of the University of Warsaw he received Doctorate in Juridicial Sciences. In 2015 President of the Republic of Poland granted him full professorship in theological sciences. He was an adjunct professor and extraordinary professor of the Christian Academy of Theolog in Warsaw, and since 2015 an ordinary professor of the Academy, where he served as the Dean of the Faculty of Theology (2008-2012) and of the Faculty of Education (2012-2016). In 2016 he was elected a deputy rector for education and development.

He was a member of the Main Chamber of the Parliament of Poland (Sejm) in the years 1993-1997 and 1997-2001, representing the Democratic Union and later the Freedom Union.

He served as president of the Polish Association of Church-State Law (2008-2016).

== Selected publications ==
- Państwowy Kościół Anglii. Studium prawa wyznaniowego [The Established Church of England. A Study in State-made Law], Wydawnictwo Naukowe ChAT, Warszawa 2016.
- Ustawa o stosunku Państwa do gmin wyznaniowych żydowskich w Polsce. Komentarz [The Law on the Relations between the State and Jewish Religious Communities in Poland] (coathor: Andrzej Czohara), WoltersKluwerBusiness, Warszawa 2012.
- Obecność religii w publicznym systemie oświaty w aspekcie prawnym [Presence of Relion in Public School System in Legal Aspect] (editor), Wydawnictwo Naukowe ChAT, Warszawa 2012.
- Państwo wobec religii w szkole publicznej według orzecznictwa Sądu Najwyższego USA [State and Religion in Public Schools in the Jurisprudence of the U.S. Supreme Court, Wydawnictwo Adam Marszałek, Toruń 2008.
- Roger Williams. Twórca nowoczesnych stosunków państwo-kościół [Roger Williams as a Creator of Modern Church-State Relations], Wydawnictwo Naukowe Semper, Warszawa 1997.
