= Andrzej Swierniak =

Polish mathematician (born 1950)

Andrzej Piotr Świerniak
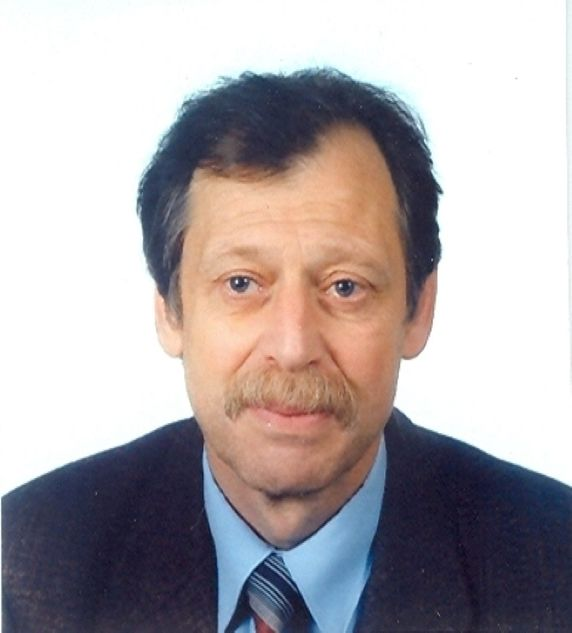
- Born: February 22, 1950 (age 76); Wałbrzych, Poland
- Education: Silesian University of Technology; University of Silesia in Katowice
- Known for: Optimal control in cancer therapy; Mathematical modeling of cell-cycle dynamics
- Awards: (1993); (1999); (2003); (2011)
- Scientific career
- Fields: Control theory, Bioinformatics, Mathematical biology
- Workplaces: Silesian University of Technology
- Doctoral advisor: Ryszard S. Gessing

Andrzej Piotr Świerniak (born 22 February 1950, in Wałbrzych) is a Polish mathematician and control theorist, known for his contributions to bioinformatics, optimal control and mathematical modelling of biomedical systems. He is a full professor at the Silesian University of Technology and a Fellow of the American Mathematical Society. In 2019 he was elected to the Rada Doskonałości Naukowej (Council of Scientific Excellence) in the discipline of biomedical engineering.

== Early life and education ==
Świerniak obtained a master's degree in automation engineering from the Faculty of Automation of the Silesian University of Technology, followed by a master's degree in mathematics from the University of Silesia in Katowice in 1975. In 1978 he received a PhD in technical sciences at the Faculty of Automatic Control and Computer Science of the Silesian University of Technology, and in 1988 his habilitation degree in automatic control and robotics. He was awarded the title of professor in 1996.

== Career ==
He became a full professor at the Silesian University of Technology at the Faculty of Automatic Control, Electronics and Computer Science, and he served as director of the Institute of Automatic Control at the Silesian University of Technology. Świerniak was a member of the Automation and Robotics Committee of the Polish Academy of Sciences, the Committee of Biocybernetics and Biomedical Engineering of PAN, the Central Commission for Degrees and Titles, and advisory bodies of the Ministry of Science and Higher Education. In 2019 he became a member of the Appeals Team of the Science Council at the Ministry of Science and Higher Education; Science Council; Appeal Team (Rada Doskonałości Naukowej ), the nation's highest distinction in the discipline of biomedical engineering. In 2012 he was elected a Fellow of the American Mathematical Society.

His research includes optimal control in cancer therapy, modelling of cell-cycle-dependent drug response, tumour repopulation dynamics, and bioinformatic analysis of gene-expression variability.

== Selected publications ==
- Swierniak, A.; Polanski, A.; Kimmel, M. (1996). "Optimal control problems arising in cell-cycle-specific cancer chemotherapy". Cell Proliferation. 29 (3): 117–139. doi:10.1046/j.1365-2184.1996.00995.x. ISSN 0960-7722. PMID 8652742. S2CID 1413722.
- Tarnawski, Rafal; Fowler, Jack; Skladowski, Krzysztof; Świerniak, Andrzej; Suwiński, Rafal; Maciejewski, Boguslaw; Wygoda, Andrzej (2002). "How fast is repopulation of tumor cells during the treatment gap?". International Journal of Radiation Oncology, Biology, Physics. 54 (1): 229–236. doi:10.1016/S0360-3016(02)02936-X. ISSN 0360-3016. PMID 12182996.
- with Barbara Jarząb, Małgorzata Wiench, Krzysztof Fujarewicz, Krzysztof Simek, Michał Jarząb, Małgorzata Oczko-Wojciechowska, Jan Włoch et al.: "Gene expression profile of papillary thyroid cancer: sources of variability and diagnostic implications." Cancer Research 65, no. 4 (2005): 1587-1597.

== Awards and honours ==
- Golden Cross of Merit (1993)
- Medal of Merit for the Silesian University of Technology (1997)
- Knight's Cross of the Order of Polonia Restituta (1999)
- Silver Badge of the Meritorious SEP (2002)
- Medal of the National Education Committee (2003)
- Honorary Medal of Prof. Obrąpalski (2005)
- PTETiS Gold Badge (2008)
- Officer's Cross of the Order of Polonia Restituta (2011)
