= University of Economics in Katowice =

Business school in Katowice, Poland

Coordinates: 50°15′33″N 19°2′39″E

- Uniwersytet Ekonomiczny w Katowicach
- Latin: Universitas Oeconomicae Catoviciensis
- Type: public
- Established: 1937
- Affiliations: EUA (2025-)
- Rector: Celina M. Olszak, Ph.D., D.Sc.
- Faculty: 507 (2016/2017)
- Administrative staff: 1033 (2016/2017)
- Students: 8,077 (12.2023)
- Location: [ul. 1 Maja 50, 40-287 Katowice], Katowice, Poland
- Website: www.ue.katowice.pl

University of Economics in Katowice (former Karol Adamiecki Academy of Economics in Katowice) is a public higher education institution in Katowice, Poland.

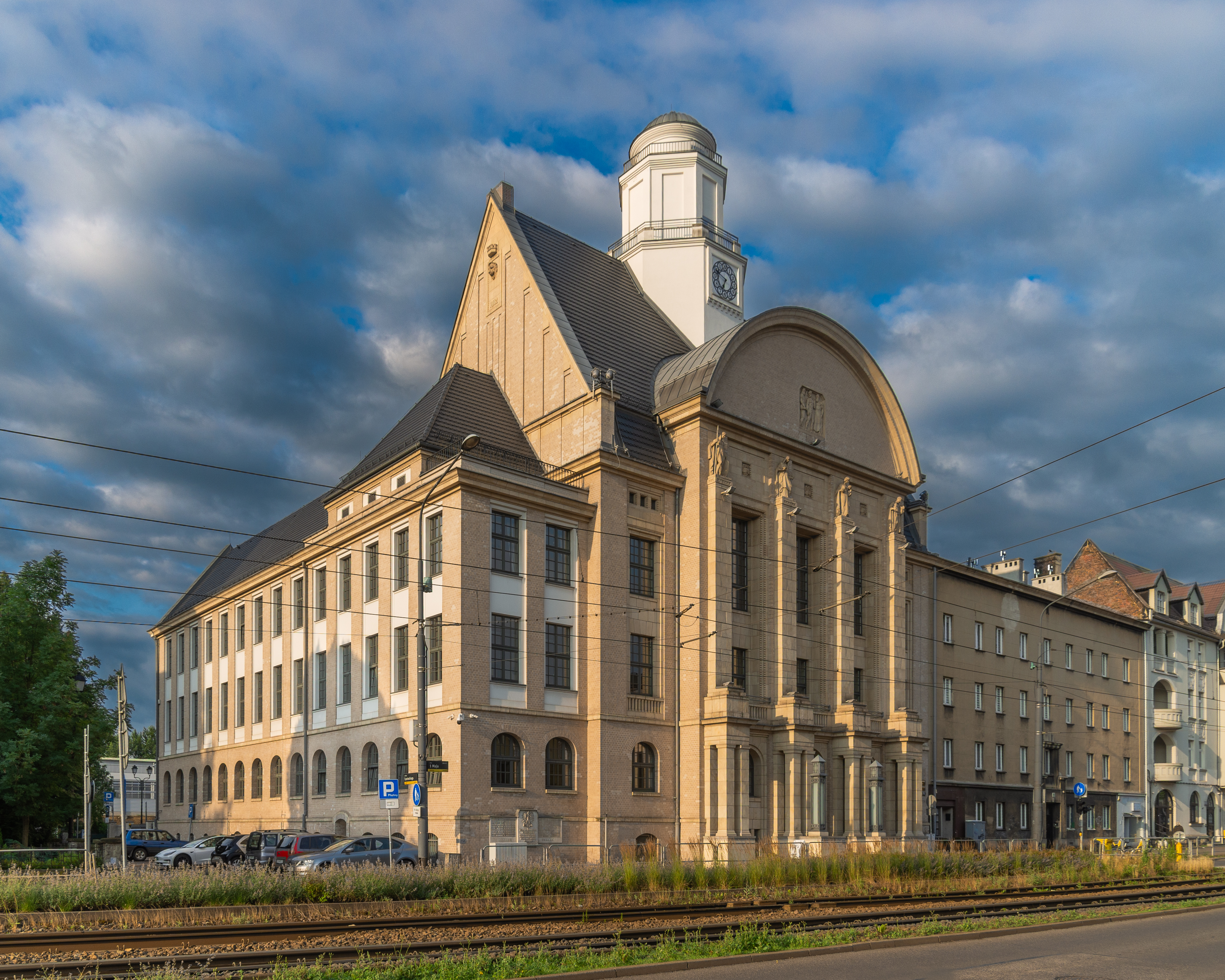
Rectorate's Office

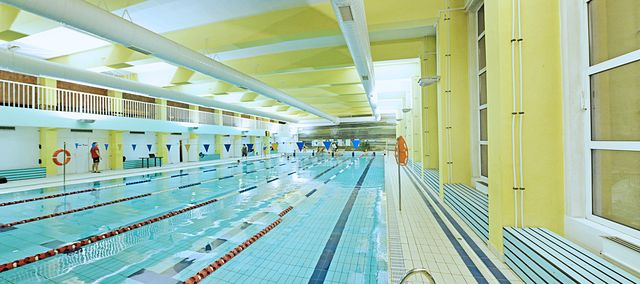
Swimming pool - building C

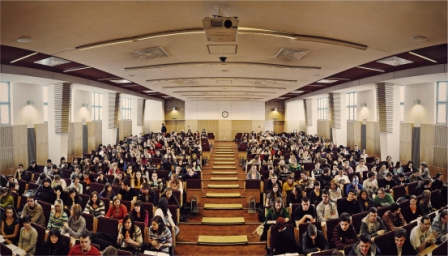
Aula A - building A

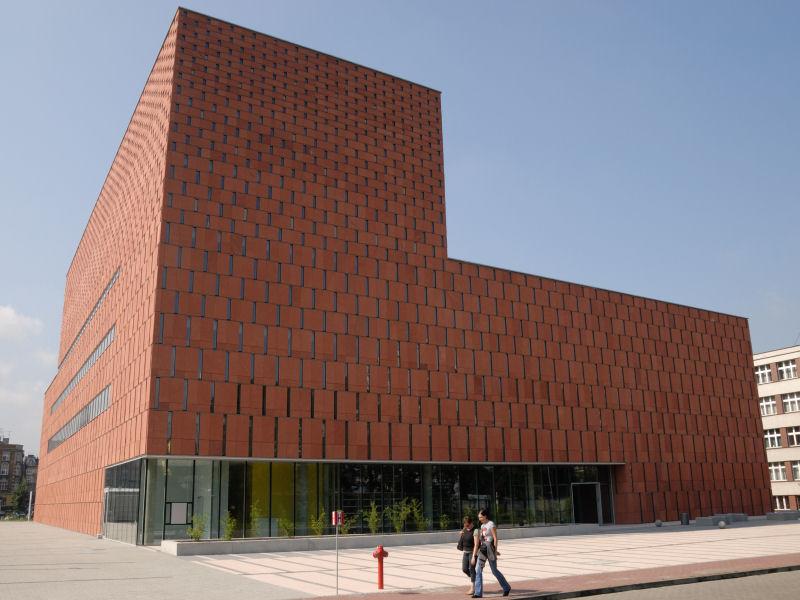
Scientific Information Centre and Academic Library

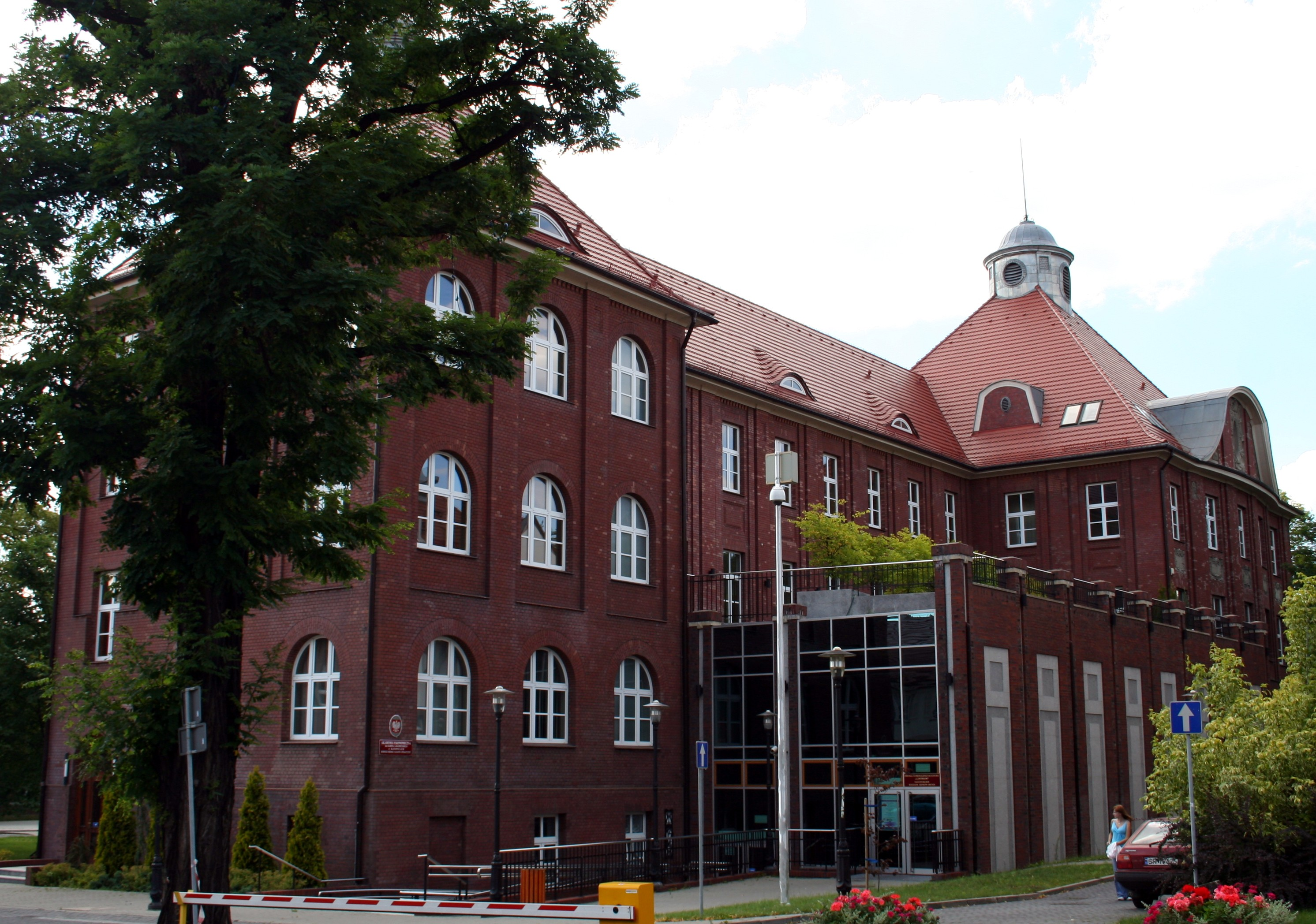
Campus in Rybnik

== History ==
The University of Economics in Katowice was founded in December 1936 (by the Decree of the Minister of Religious Affairs and Public Education of the Republic of Poland of 1936) as a private School of Social and Economic Sciences. On January 11, 1937 the institution opened its doors to students and began teaching at the Faculty of Industrial Organization – the School’s only faculty at the time. This date marks the beginning of the University’s operation. In 1938 the Faculty of Public Administration was opened. Studies at both faculties lasted three years and were aimed at educating professionals for the growing industry sector. Dr. Józef Lisak was the founder and the first Rector of the University. In the beginning the School of Social and Economic Sciences was located in a few rooms rented from a renowned secondary school – Silesian School of Technology.

On September 1, 1939, the School was closed due to the war and occupation. Its activity was resumed in February 1945, when teaching at both Faculties was reactivated. Moreover, the educational offer, in particular in the area of economics, was expanded thanks to the establishment of the Central School of Accounting and Finance. The teaching staff has also increased. In the post-war years, a large migration of population was a common phenomenon in Poland. During that time many academic teachers and scientists from other academic centers decided to stay temporarily or permanently in Katowice. They contribution greatly influenced the School’s development and helped to ensure a high level of education. The graduates of the School of Social and Economic Sciences were professionals sought after by not only industrial enterprises, but also the government and local administration. The curriculum in place until 1948 was designed to include the needs of the local community and economic conditions characteristic to the region.

The number of students increased systematically. In response to the growing academic community, the School received two buildings in Katowice, situated in vicinity of ul. 1 Maja and ul. Bogucicka: a classical former town hall of the Zawodzie commune (now the Rector's Office) and a school building, which was adapted to serve as a facility for academic teaching (now the building "A"). The academic year 1946/1947 was inaugurated in the new building, after the rooms have been renovated following the war damage. In the 70’s and 80’s a whole complex of new buildings was erected around the two mentioned buildings, creating the School’s campus. At the same time the status and position of the School were changing. In 1950, Polish government decided to standardize economic education across the country. Like all economic schools, the School in Katowice was nationalized and transformed into the School of Economy. Legal education at the Faculty of Public Administration was discontinued, and the Faculty of Commerce was established in its place. The well-developed and autonomous Central School of Accounting and Finance was transformed in 1950 into the Faculty of Finance and Accounting, which functioned until 1958. In addition, the Faculty of Industrial Organization was renamed the Faculty of Industrial Planning. In the academic year 1952/1953 the School was granted the right to award the academic degree of ‘magister’ to its graduates. In 1950s, the education focused on issues related to central planning, accounting and finance.

Between 1958 and 1968, the School had only one faculty and provided education to students in full-time, evening, extension and extramural modes. A network of consultation points was established in Opole, Bielsko, Częstochowa and Rybnik.

The 60's were marked by the development of education in the field of industrial economics and enterprises. In 1968, the Faculty of Trade and Food Economics was established. In 1974 it was transformed into the Faculty of Trade, Transport and Services, thus significantly expanding the scope of School’s scientific and teaching activities. Gradually, the reputation of the School of Economy in Katowice as a prominent research center grew. In 1960 the Faculty of Industry was granted the right to confer the degree of doctor, and in 1969 the right to confer the degree of doctor of economic sciences. The other Faculty was granted analogous rights: in 1979 to confer the degree of doctor of economic sciences, and in 1991 to confer the degree of doctor habilitatus of economic sciences.

In 1972, the School was named in honor of Karol Adamiecki - an outstanding engineer, economist, scholar and activist, co-founder of the science of organization and management in Poland. In 1974, together with economic schools in Kraków, Poznań and Wrocław, the institution’s status was changed to the Academy of Economics.

In 1992, the Faculty of Industry was replaced by the Faculty of Management, and the Faculty of Commerce, Transport and Services by the Faculty of Economics. In 1999, a new building "P" was officially opened at ul. Pułaskiego 25. Major organizational changes in the Academy took place in 2002, when the third Faculty was established - the Faculty of Finance and Insurance. At the same time the Rybnik Science and Teaching Center was opened, which together with the Silesian University of Technology and University of Silesia formed a Complex of Higher Education Schools in Rybnik. In 2005, the State Treasury has handed over to the University the building located at ul. ks. bsp Stanisława Adamskiego 7 - building "N".

In 2009, a fourth faculty was created - the Faculty of Informatics and Communication. In January 2010 it obtained the right to confer the degree of doctor in the discipline of management sciences, and in June 2016 the right to confer the degree of doctor habilitatus in the same discipline.

Since October 1, 2010, by virtue of the Act of August 5, 2010 (Journal of Laws of 2010, no. 165, item 1117), the Academy was transformed into the "University of Economics in Katowice".

In 2014, the building of the Center for Modern Information Technologies (CNTI) was opened and the fifth faculty - Faculty of Business, Finance and Administration - was established in Rybnik. Since the 2015/2016 academic year, the faculty in Rybnik started to provide education in the Finance and Accounting program with a practical profile.

Since 2016, the Faculty of Finance and Insurance has been granted the authority to confer the degree of doctor of economic sciences in the discipline of finance, and the Faculty of Informatics and Communication, together with the Faculty of Economics, received the right to confer the degree of doctor of economic sciences in the discipline of management sciences.

In 2018, the Palace and Park Complex in Młoszowa was handed over to the State Treasury.

In 2019, the University introduced changes imposed by the Act of July 20, 2018 – Law of Higher Education and Science. Those changes included: liquidation of faculties; establishment of two scientific committees - the Scientific Committee for Economics and Finance and the Scientific Committee for Management Science and Quality; introduction of four colleges - the College of Economics, the College of Finance, the College of Informatics and Communication and the College of Management; establishment of the Doctoral School and the School of Undergraduate and Graduate Studies; transformation of the Faculty of Business, Finance and Administration in Rybnik into a Branch of the School of Undergraduate and Graduate Studies of the University of Economics in Katowice. In that year the building "D" at ul. Bogucicka 14 in Katowice was also demolished.

In 2020, UE Katowice became the first university in Silesia to receive CEEMAN International Quality Accreditation.

In 2021, the Colleges were transformed into Faculties: College of Economics into Faculty of Economics, College of Finance into Faculty of Finance, College of Informatics and Communication into Faculty of Informatics and Communication, and College of Management into Faculty of Management.

== Rectors of the University ==
=== University of Economics in Katowice (2010) ===
- 2020-now: Celina Olszak
- 2016–2020: Robert Tomanek
- 2012–2016: Leszek Żabiński
- 2008–2012: Jan Pyka

=== Karol Adamiecki Academy of Economics in Katowice (1972) ===
- 2002–2008: Florian Kuźnik
- 1996–2002: Jan Wojtyła
- 1993–1996: Lucyna Frąckiewicz
- 1990–1993: Krzysztof Zadora
- 1982–1990: Jerzy Rokita
- 1975–1982: Zbigniew Messner
- 1965–1975: Alojzy Melich

=== National School of Economic Administration (1949) / School of Economy (1950) ===
- 1958–1965: Józef Szaflarski
- 1956–1958: Marian Frank
- 1952–1956: Witold Gawdzik
- 1949–1952: Zygmunt Izdebski

=== School of Social and Economic Sciences (1936) ===
- 1937–1939; 1945–1949: Józef Lisak

== Authorities ==
- Rector: Prof. Celina M. Olszak, Ph.D., D.Sc.
- Vice-Rector for Education and International Relations: Prof. Sławomir Smyczek, Ph.D.
- Vice-Rector for Science and Academic Staff Development: Prof. Maciej Nowak, Ph.D.
- Vice-Rector for Development and Cooperation with External Environment: Prof. Robert Wolny, Ph.D.

== Doctors Honoris Causa ==
The highest honor conferred by the University’s Senate is the title of doctor honoris causa. The award of a title is a symbolic act of acceptance into the academic community of the University of Economics in Katowice. The title is granted to individuals for outstanding achievements in the field of science or culture, as well as other activities that serve the common good of the nation or humanity. The conferment of the title of doctor honoris cause is recorded in the Honorary Book of the University of Economics in Katowice.

- 2021 – Malay Gosh
- 2015 – Bogusław Fiedor
- 2013 – Szewach Weiss
- 2011 – Jacques Delors
- 2005 – Leszek Balcerowicz
- 2004 – Ber Haus
- 1999 – Bohdan Gruchman
- 1998 – Tadeusz Mazowiecki
- 1995 – Kazimierz Zając
- 1995 – Bernd Hamm
- 1987 – Józef Szaflarski
- 1987 – Jean H.P. Pealinck
- 1972 – Hans Borchert
- 1972 – Jan Mitręga

== Faculties and the Branch ==
The University is divided into 4 faculties and a branch

- Rybnik Branch
- Faculty of Economics
- Faculty of Finance
- Faculty of Informatics and Communication
- Faculty of Management

== Educational offer ==
- Full-time undergraduate programs (e.g. Economic Analytics, Journalism and Social Communication, Economics, Managerial Finance, Finance and Accounting for Business, Finance and Accounting, Finance and Management in Health Care, Economy and Public Management, Spatial Economics, Tourism Economics, Informatics, Informatics and Econometrics, International Business, Logistics in business, Logistics, International Economic Relations, Entrepreneurship and Finance, Management)
- Full time graduate programs (e.g. Economic Analytics, Journalism and Social Communication, E-Commerce, Finance and Accounting for Business, Finance and Accounting, Quantitative Asset and Risk Management, Finance and Management in Health Care, Managerial Finance, Economy and Public Management, Digital Economy, Urban Economy and Real Estate, Spatial Economics, Tourism Economics, Informatics and Econometrics, Informatics, International Business, MERCURI, Logistics, Logistics in business, International Economic Relations, Entrepreneurship and Finance, Management)
- Part-time undergraduate programs (e.g. Economics, Security in Business, Journalism and Social Communication, Finance and Accounting, Digital Economy, Urban Economy and Real Estate, Informatics, Informatics and Econometrics, Logistics in Business, Logistics, International Economic Relations, Entrepreneurship and Finance, Accounting and Taxes, Management)
- Part-time graduate programs (e.g. Journalism and Social Communication, Economics, Finance and Business Economics, Finance and Accounting, Digital Economics, Urban Economics and Real Estate, Informatics, Informatics and Econometrics, Logistics, Logistics in business, International Economic Relations, Entrepreneurship and Finance, Management)
- English-taught programs
- Doctoral School (education is provided in two academic disciplines: Economics and Finance and Management and Quality Sciences)
- Postgraduate programs (e.g. Academy of Agile Leadership, Business Data Analysis and Modeling, Investigative Auditing, Brand Manager and PR Manager, Human Resources and Payroll, National Accounting Standards with the use of IT Systems, Master of Business Administration in Corporate Governance, Professional Organization and Team Management, Sales and Customer Service, Leader of Sustainable Development, Machine Learning and Data Science, Design of Products and Services for the Food Industry)
- MBA studies
- Trainings and courses (offer includes trainings in such areas as: Data analysis and visualization in Microsoft Power BI, Employee opinion surveys in your company, Finance for beginners, Google Ads from scratch, and Creating websites in WordPress)
- Children’s University of Economics – program aimed at pupils of primary schools
- Academy of Young Economists – programs for older students of primary schools
- Economics for High Schools and Technical High Schools - a program for students of secondary schools
- University of Economics of the Third Age

== Student organizations operating at the University ==
- Student Parliament
- AIESEC
- Academic Sports Association (AZS)
- European Centre for Integration and Development (ECID)
- European Students' Forum AEGEE Katowice
- "Gaudeamus" Catholic Academic Association
- IGO Club of University of Economics in Katowice
- Independent Student Association (NZS)
- Students’ Organization PANEUROPA
- Organization of Disabled Students of UE Katowice
- Students' Forum Business Centre Club – Katowice Chapter
- Silesian Students' Forum Business Centre Club (BCC) Katowice

== Research clubs operating at the University ==
There are 35 research clubs operating under faculties of the University of Economics in Katowice, where students can deepen their scientific interests in selected fields, as well as gain practical experience. The current list of active clubs is as follows:

- “Sport Economics” Research Club
- “FOREX’ Research Club
- “Real Estate” Research Club
- “IT Management Systems” Research Club
- “HASHTAG” Research Club
- “International Challenge” Research Club of International Economic Relations program
- “Manager” Research Club
- "AREA Urban Area Research" Research Club
- Transportation Research Club
- “HR” Research Club
- Bank Research Club
- Financial Engineering Research Club
- "QUANTUM" Research Club for Financial Modelling
- Financial Market Analysis Research Club
- “AUREUS” Financial Law Research Club
- "Broker" Investment Research Club
- “Glob-Fin” Research Club
- “Meritum” Marketing Research Club
- Informatics Research Club
- “SCIENTIA INGENIUM” Research Club
- "Algorithmics and Programming" Research Club
- Business Journalism and Media Studies Research Club
- International Business Research Club
- “NKL Dialog” Logistics Research Club
- “AD_VENTURE” Research Club
- "KoNTiki" Tourism Research Club
- Research Club of Statisticians
- “Synergy” Management Research Club
- "Human Resource Development" Research Club
- “Matrioszka” Research Club
- “Common Language” Research Club
- “MANAGEMEDIA” Research Club
- “Cymelium” Research Club
- Economics and Public Management Research Club
- Economic Debate Research Club

== International cooperation ==
The University of Economics in Katowice maintains international partnerships with numerous higher education institutions. The cooperation includes such initiatives as: ERASMUS program, business trips of academic and administrative staff, organization of scientific conferences and promotional events, as well as joint international programs and projects. UE Katowice has signed partnership agreements with selected universities located in: Albania, Austria, Azerbaijan, Belgium, Belarus, Brazil, Bulgaria, Chile, China, Croatia, Cyprus, Montenegro, Czech Republic, Denmark, Egypt, Estonia, Finland, France, Greece, Spain, the Netherlands, Hong Kong, India, Ireland, Israel, Japan, Kazakhstan, Colombia, South Korea, Lebanon, Germany, Hungary, Italy, Latvia, Lithuania, Macedonia, Mauritius, Norway, Palestine, Paraguay, Portugal, Russia, Romania, Serbia, Singapore, Slovakia, Slovenia, Spain, Sweden, Switzerland, Taiwan, Turkey, Ukraine, USA, and the United Kingdom.

== Partners of the University of Economics in Katowice ==
University of Economics in Katowice participates in various projects, often in partnership with companies and public institutions. Over the years, the University has cooperated with such entities as: Amazon, Decathlon, Elamed, FAMUR, ING Bank Śląski, Chamber of Industry and Commerce in Tarnowskie Góry, Koleje Śląskie, Silesian Museum, Radio Katowice, Silesian Asset Valuers’ Association, Tauron Polska Energia, Węglokoks, Silesian Voivodship, Polish Scientific Publishers PWN and Polish Bank Association.

== System of Privileges for Alumni (SPA) ==
Following the inauguration of the 2014/2015 academic year, the University has launched the System of Privileges for Alumni (Pol. “System Przywilejów Absolwenta” or SPA) - a program dedicated to graduates of the University of Economics in Katowice, whose main objective is to maintain and strengthen the University's ties with its alumni.

Graduates enrolled in the program can get the Alumni Card, which entitles the holder to preferential prices for educational services offered by the University, in particular postgraduate studies, as well as discounts on products and services provided by the program’s partners.

== “myUE” mobile app ==
The "myUE" mobile app was created as part of the "Inter Uni - Supporting internationalization. Strengthening relations between the University, candidates, students, graduates and employees using new media” project, that was carried out by the Promotion and New Media Bureau. Its goal was to facilitate cooperation between universities and support the internationalization process. The project was conducted jointly with the Norwegian University of Science and Technology (NTNU) in Trondheim and the University of Liechtenstein. It received funding from the governments of Iceland, Liechtenstein and Norway. The main outcome of the project was a scientific conference and workshops, which became a platform for the exchange of experiences and views, as well as the integration of the scientific community. The activities undertaken during the project resulted in the joint publication and creation of the "Ambassadors’ Platform" mobile app – an IT and promotion tool that helps to build relationships between the University and candidates, students, employees and alumni.
