= Gertruda Uścińska =

Polish political scientist

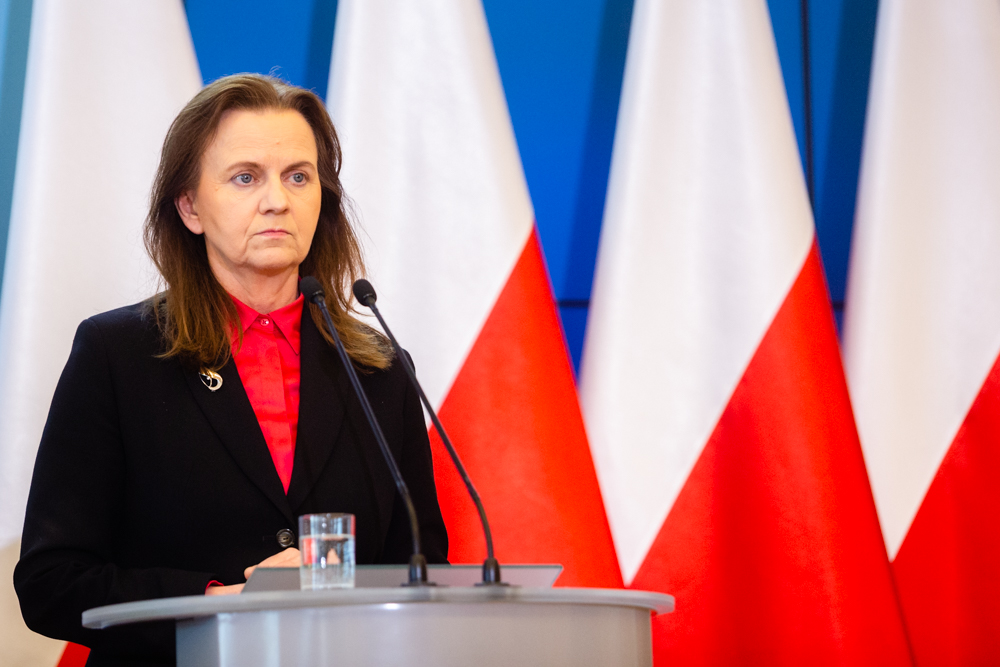
- Born: 23 January 1958 (age 68); Poland
- Education: University of Silesia in Katowice; Polish Institute of Labor and Social Affairs; University of Warsaw
- Awards: Member, Polish Academy of Sciences
- Scientific career
- Fields: Political science
- Workplaces: Polish Institute of Labor and Social Affairs; University of Warsaw; Social Insurance Institution

Gertruda Uścińska (born 23 January 1958) is a Polish lawyer and political scientist. She is a Professor of Social Sciences at The University of Warsaw and the Polish Institute of Labor and Social Affairs in Warsaw (pl). Since 2016, Uścińska has been the President of Poland's Social Insurance Institution, which is the Polish state organization responsible for social insurance. She has also been an elected Chairwoman at the International Social Security Association.

== Career ==
In 1981 she graduated from the Faculty of Law and Administration at the University of Silesia in Katowice. In 1987, she obtained a PhD in law at the Institute of Labor and Social Affairs. In 2006, she earned a post-graduate degree in political science at the University of Warsaw in the faculty of humanities, specializing in evidence-based social policy. Her dissertation studied comparative social security benefits in Poland and abroad.

She is a member of the research faculty at the Polish Institute of Labor and Social Affairs, and since 1989 she has also been a faculty member at The University of Warsaw. She became a lecturer at the Institute of Social Policy of the University of Warsaw in 1989, and later became an Associate Professor both at the University of Warsaw and at the Institute of Labor and Social Affairs. On July 17, 2015, she was named a Professor of Social Sciences at The University of Warsaw. Uścińska has also been the Deputy Dean for student affairs at the Faculty of Journalism and Political Studies at The University of Warsaw.

On February 11, 2016, Uścińska was appointed the President of Poland's Social Insurance Institution. She was then elected the Chairwoman of the steering committee for the technical committee at the International Social Security Association, specializing in policy related to old age, incapacity for work, and death of a household breadwinner. She was also appointed to the management office of the International Social Security Association. In this capacity she has regularly represented Poland in international fora, for example at the centenary of the International Labour Organization in Geneva in 2019.

She has multiple times been listed in the ranking of the 50 most influential Polish lawyers in the Polish legal and business newspaper Dziennik Gazeta Prawna: in 2016 she was listed in 15th place, and in 2019 she was listed in 47th place. She has also been a member of the Committee on Labor and Social Policy Sciences at the Polish Academy of Sciences.

Uścińska has won the Virtus Est Perfecta Ratio medal, and has been granted a Diploma of Recognition from the Polish Bank Association and the Center for Banking Law and Education for her work in the field of economic education. The Social Insurance Institution under her management was awarded the Polish Innovation Award by the Polish Agency of Entrepreneurship.

== Selected Awards ==
- Member, Polish Academy of Sciences
- Virtus Est Perfecta Ratio medal
