= Free access =

Free access can refer to:

- Entry or availability without payment, see Gratis versus libre
- Entry to a place without barriers to e.g. disabled people, see Accessibility
- Free content, creative content for which there are very minimal limitations on usage, modification and distribution
- Free entry, a condition in which firms can freely enter a market
- Open access, the principle of unrestricted availability of scholarly publications
