= University of Silesia in Katowice =

Autonomous state-run university in Katowice, Silesia Province, Poland

Coordinates: 50°15′38″N 19°1′41″E

The University of Silesia in Katowice
- Uniwersytet Śląski w Katowicach
- Latin: Universitas Silesiensis
- Type: Public
- Established: 8 June 1968
- Affiliations: Erasmus+, CEEPUS, EUA, European Physics Education Network (EUPEN), European Law Faculties Association (ELFA) AUF, European Association of Schools of Social Work (EASSW), EUNIS, EPSO, CERN, European Chemistry Thematic Network (ECTN)
- Rector: Ryszard Koziołek
- Faculty: 2,082
- Students: 18,306 (12.2023)
- Postgraduates: 1,614
- Location: ul. Bankowa 12, 40-007, Katowice, Poland
- Campus: Katowice, Sosnowiec, Cieszyn, Chorzów
- Website: us.edu.pl/en/

University rankings

Regional – Overall
- QS Emerging Europe and Central Asia: 92 (2022)

The University of Silesia in Katowice (Polish: Uniwersytet Śląski w Katowicach, UŚ) is an autonomous state-run university in Katowice, Silesia Province, Poland.

The university offers higher education and research facilities. It offers undergraduate, masters, and PhD degree programs, as well as postgraduate, postdoctoral research, habilitation, and continuous education and training programs.

== History ==
Location of University of Silesia in Katowice within Poland.

The history of the University of Silesia in Katowice dates back to 1928, when the Instytut Pedagogiczny w Katowicach (Pedagogical Institute in Katowice) was established in Katowice which existed till 1939. In 1950, the Higher Pedagogical School in Katowice was established, however, first preparations to formation of what would later become the University of Silesia in Katowice were taken just after the end of Second World War.

In June 1962, a branch of Jagiellonian University was settled in Katowice, which concentrated, apart from humanities, on mathematics, physics and law. Together with the Higher Pedagogical School in Katowice, these are the foundations of what came to life on June 8, 1968, as the University of Silesia in Katowice. And so on October 1, 1968, the University (composed of four faculties) had its first academic year inaugurated, providing almost 6,000 students with twelve programmes, such as philology, pedagogics, psychology, history, law, administration, mathematics, physics, chemistry, physical education, electrotechnics and mechanics. Three years later, the branch of the University in Cieszyn was established, and in following years (1974-1978) six new faculties were opened. In the years of 2002 and 2003, last two faculties were established, which had their roots in a reformed branch of the University in Cieszyn.

== Location ==
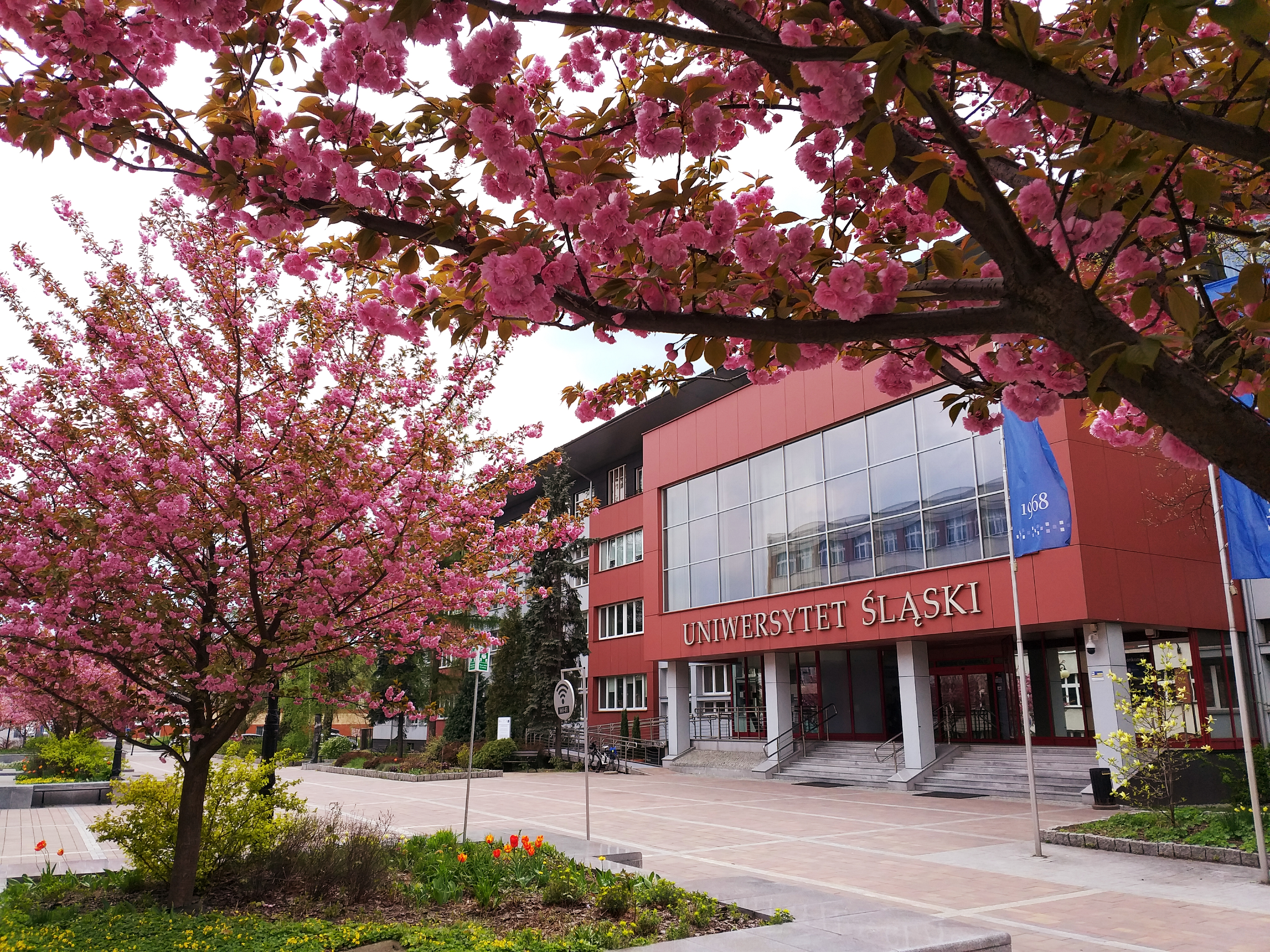
Main University building, Katowice

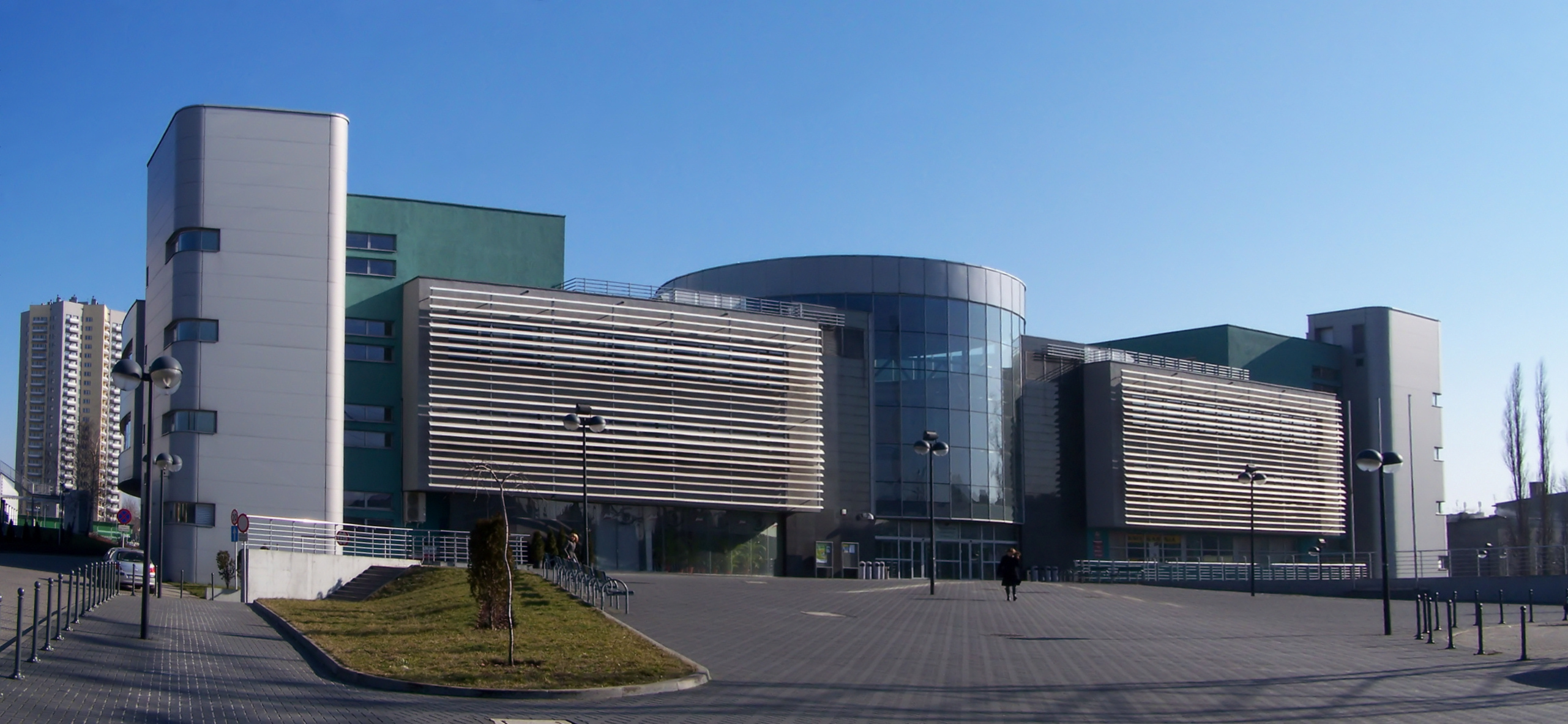
Building of the Faculty of Law and Administration, Katowice

Uniwersytet Śląski w Katowicach has facilities in four cities in the Metropolis GZM region: Katowice, Sosnowiec, Cieszyn and Chorzów. The majority of facilities are in Katowice; the main campus is in the city center.

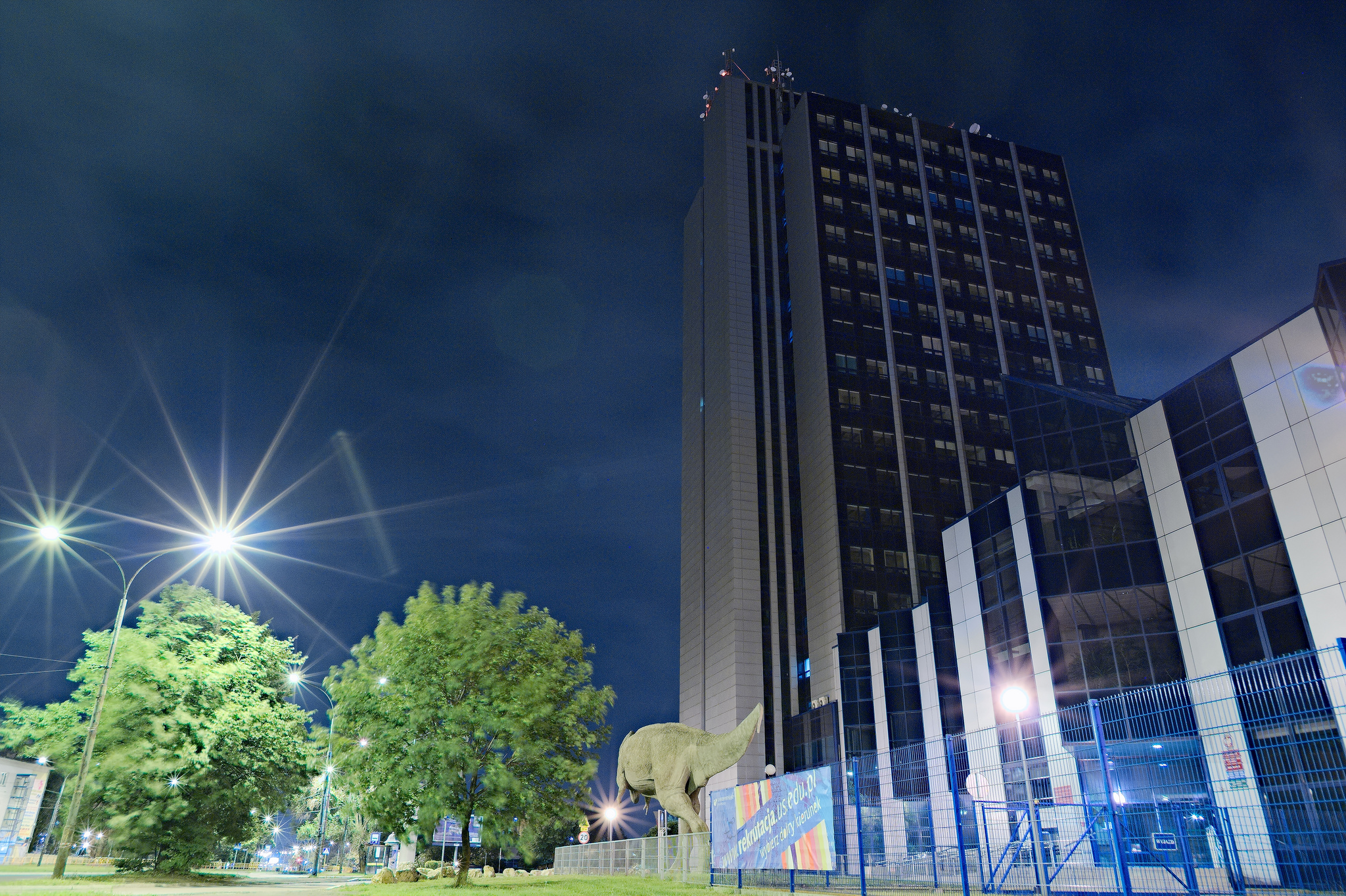
Campus in Sosnowiec

== Facts and figures ==
- Number of teachers: 2,082
- Number of students: 27,395
- Number of faculties: 8 (since 2019)
- Number of programmes: 71
- Number of specializations: 234

== International agreements ==
The University of Silesia has signed over 600 bilateral agreements with partner institutions in countries all over the world. Among the others University of Silesia cooperates with: Saint Petersburg State University, University of Buenos Aires, University of Alberta, Beijing Foreign Studies University, Tokyo University of Foreign Studies and in the frame of programme Erasmus+ with: University of Vienna, University of Helsinki, Charles University in Prague, University of Birmingham, University of Strasbourg, University of Bologna, Sapienza University of Rome, University of Verona, University of Lisbon, Stockholm University, University of Oslo, Paris-Sorbonne University, University of Zurich, University of Valencia, University of Barcelona.

== Faculties ==
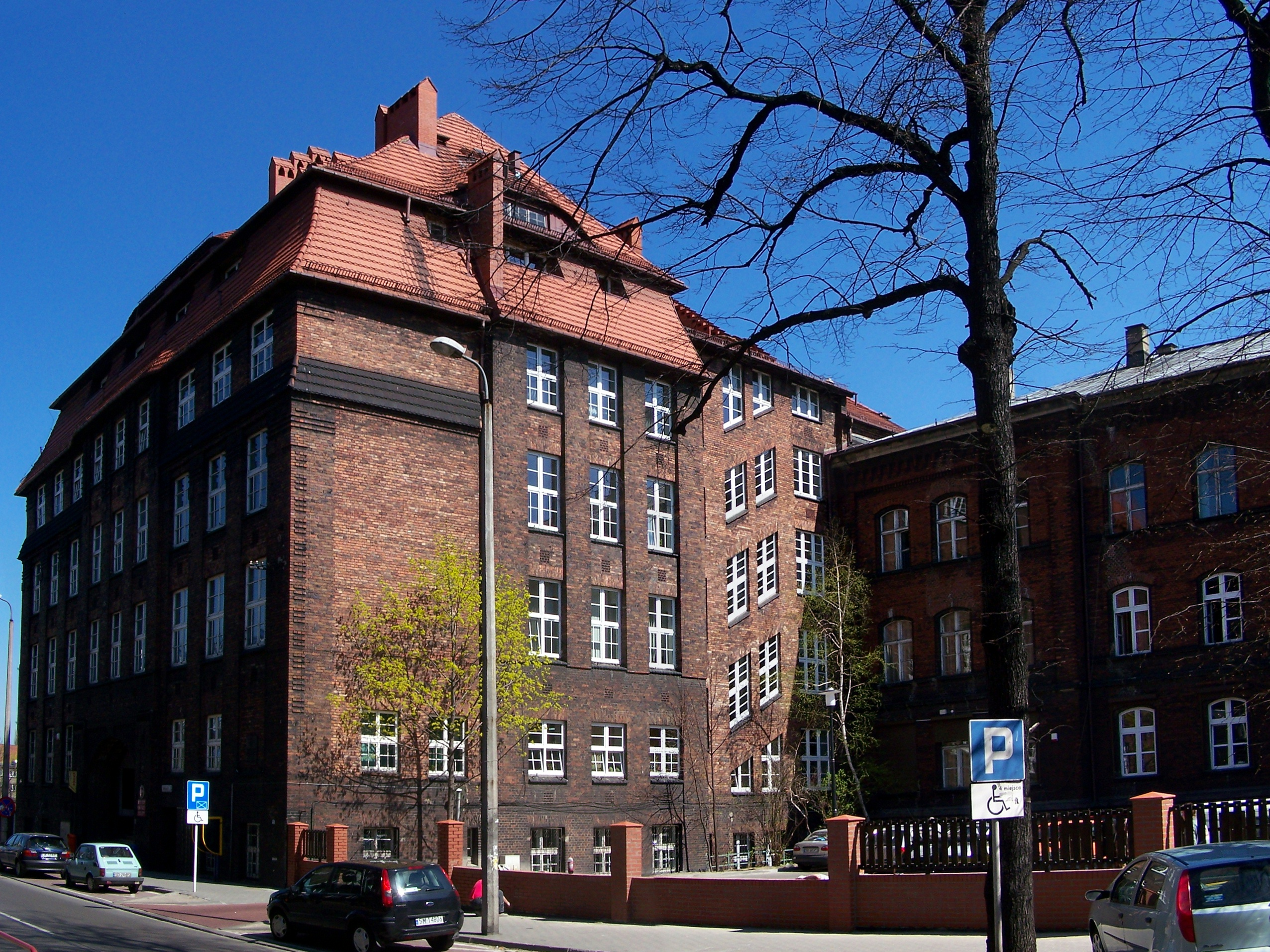
Main building of the Institute of Chemistry, (part of Faculty of Science and Technology), Katowice

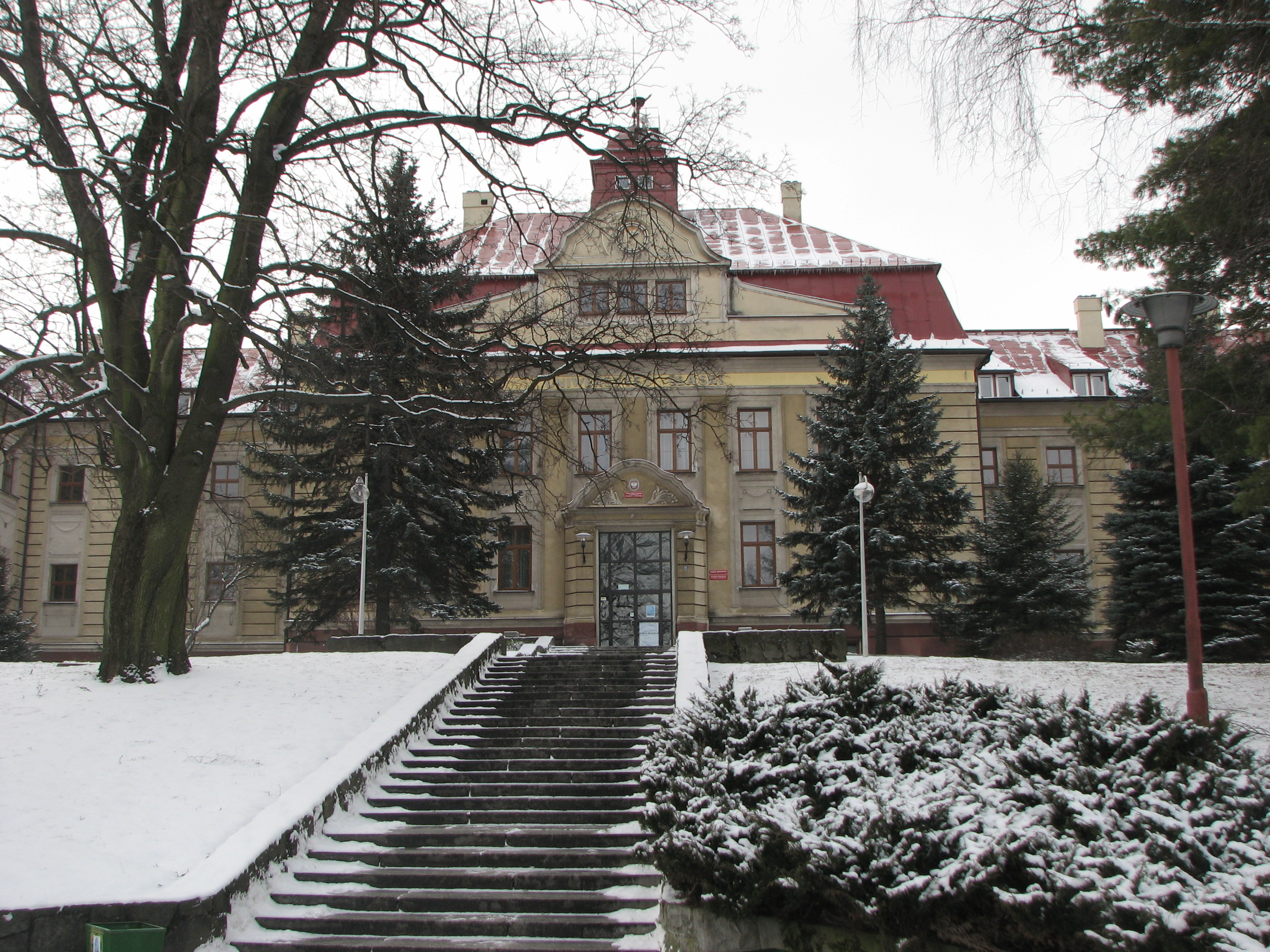
Faculty of Arts and Education Sciences, Cieszyn

The University of Silesia in Katowice has schools of modern languages, natural science, and technology, and a language teacher training college.

It is divided into the following faculties:

- Faculty of Humanities
- Faculty of Natural Sciences
- Faculty of Social Sciences
- Faculty of Science and Technology
- Faculty of Law and Administration
- Faculty of Arts and Education Sciences
- Faculty of Theology
- Krzysztof Kieślowski Film School

== Rectors ==
- prof. dr hab. Kazimierz Popiołek (1968-07-02 – 1972-09-30)
- prof. dr hab. Henryk Rechowicz (1972-10-01 – 1980-07-05)
- prof. dr hab. Sędzimir Klimaszewski (1980-12-05 – 1980-12-15, 1980-12-16 – 1981-09-30, 1982-06-01 – 1984-09-30, 1984-10-01 – 1987-09-30, 1987-10-01 – 1990-11-30)
- prof. dr hab. August Chełkowski (1981-10-01 – 1982-01-16)
- prof. dr hab. Maksymilian Pazdan (1990-12-01 – 1993-08-31, 1993-09-01 – 1996-08-31)
- prof. dr hab. Tadeusz Sławek (1996-09-01 – 1999-08-31, 1999-09-01 – 2002-08-31)
- prof. dr hab. Janusz Janeczek(2002-09-01 – 2005-08-31, 2005-09-01 – 2008-08-31)
- prof. dr hab. Wiesław Banyś (2008-09-01 – 2012-08-31, 2012-09-01 – 2016-08-31)
- prof. dr hab. Andrzej Kowalczyk
- prof. dr hab. Ryszard Koziołek

== Libraries ==
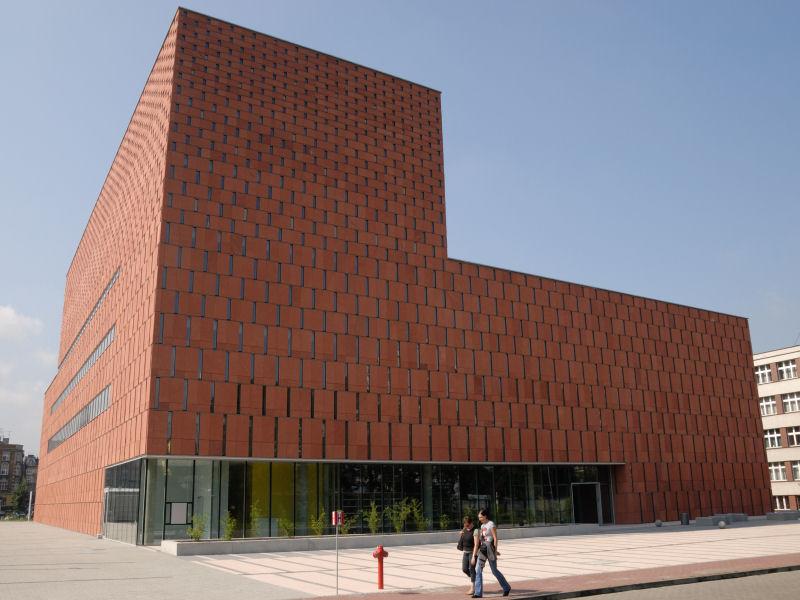
Scientific Information Centre and Academic Library (CINiBA), Katowice

Scientific Information Centre and Academic Library (Polish Acronym: CINiBA), opened in 2012, is a modern scientific library open for students and researchers, as well as people unrelated to university or academic activities. Being a joint project of the University of Silesia and University of Economics in Katowice, most of the materials are available in the open space to which users have free access. The library is equipped with modern technologies and information tools, and is adapted to meet the expectations people with disabilities.

In 2015 it was nominated for European Union Prize for Contemporary Architecture award.

== Rankings ==
University rankings

Global – Overall
- THE World: 801-1000

In 2017, Times Higher Education ranked the university within the 801-1000 band globally.

== Notable professors ==
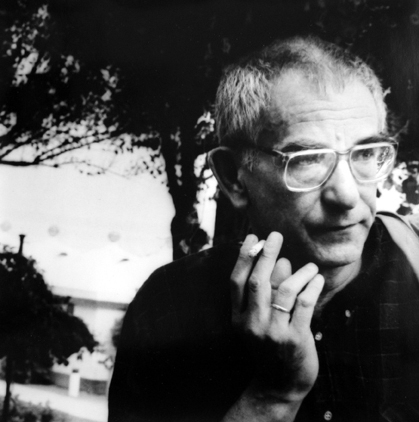
Krzysztof Kieślowski

- Krzysztof Kieślowski (1941–1996), film director and screenwriter
- Krzysztof Zanussi (born 1939), film and theatre director, producer and screenwriter
- Jerzy Stuhr (1947-2024), film and theatre actor
- Andrzej Fidyk (born 1953), documentary filmmaker
- Marcin Koszałka (born 1970), cinematographer and film director
- Eugenia Mandal, psychologist
- Marcin Wrona (1973–2015), film director
- Filip Bajon (born 1947), film director and screenwriter
- Marek Kuczma (1935–1991), mathematician
- August Chełkowski (1927–1999), physicist and politician
- Jan Mikusiński (1913–1987), mathematician
- Jerzy Gorzelik (born 1971), politician and art historian
- Józef Ciągwa (born 1939), professor of jurisprudence

== Notable students ==
- Urszula Antoniak (born 1968), film director
- Tomasz Beksiński (1958–1999), radio presenter and journalist
- Krystyna Bochenek (1953–2010), politician, former Vice-Marshal of the Senate of the Republic of Poland
- Mateusz Bochenek (1993), politician
- Borys Budka (1978), politician, former leader of the Civic Platform political party
- Paweł Czarnota (born 1988), chess grandmaster
- Jan Drabina (born 1939), historian
- Anita Gargas (born 1964), journalist
- Maria Husarska (born 1981), artist
- Tomasz Kamusella (1967), scholar
- Maciej Konieczny (1980), politician
- Ataullah Bogdan Kopański (born 1948), historian
- Grzegorz Lach (born 1967), historian
- Tadeusz Lubelski (1949), film historian, theorist and critic
- Henryka Mościcka-Dendys (born 1976), diplomat
- Idzi Panic (born 1952), historian
- Magdalena Piekorz (born 1974), film director, screenwriter, winner of the Golden Lions at the 29th Gdynia Film Festival
- Renata Przemyk (born 1966), singer
- Stsiapan Putsila (born 1998), Belarusian journalist, blogger and film director, founder of the media outlet Nexta
- Michał Rosa (born 1963), film director
- Tomasz Sapota (born 1970), classical philologist
- Sławomir Skrzypek (1963–2010), economist, former President of the National Bank of Poland
- Jan Sładkowski (born 1958), physicist
- Andrzej Swierniak (born 1950), mathematician
- Konrad Szołajski (born 1956), film director
- Maciej Ślesicki (born 1966), film director
- Szczepan Twardoch (born 1979), writer
- Gertruda Uścińska (born 1958), lawyer and political scientist
- Piotr Wilczek (born 1962), historian
- Natalia Zamilska, (born 1989), composer, DJ and music producer
- Tadeusz Zieliński (1966), theologian

== See also ==
- List of universities in Poland
- University of Silesia (Czech Republic)
