= List of video games developed in the Czech Republic =

This is an incomplete list of video games developed in the Czech Republic, both released and upcoming.

== Games developed in the Czech Republic ==
Title	Genre	Platform	Year	Developer	Notes
Poklad	Text-based	ZX Spectrum	1984	Fuxoft	
Poklad 2	Text-based	ZX Spectrum	1984	Fuxoft	Sequel to Poklad.
Bowling 2000	Sports game	ZX Spectrum	1985	Fuxoft	
Boxing	Fighting game	ZX Spectrum	1985	Fuxoft	
Indiana Jones a Chrám zkázy	Text adventure	ZX Spectrum	1985	Fuxoft	A parody of the Indiana Jones film series.
Kaboom!	Arcade game	ZX Spectrum	1986	Fuxoft	A remake of a 1981 video game Kaboom!.
Planet of Shades	Arcade game	ZX Spectrum	1986	Cybexlab; Fuxoft	
Podraz 3	Text-based	ZX Spectrum	1986	Fuxoft	
Flappy	Puzzle video game	PMD 85	1987	VBG Software	Inspired by the Japanese game Flappy.
Galactic Gunners	Shoot 'em up	ZX Spectrum	1987	Cybexlab Software	Re-released in 1992 by Ultrasoft.
Indiana Jones 2	Text adventure	ZX Spectrum	1987	Fuxoft	A parody of the Indiana Jones film series.
F.I.R.E.	Shoot 'em up	ZX Spectrum	1988	Fuxoft	The title is an acronym for Fast Ingenious and Risky Elimination.
Jet-Story	Arcade game	ZX Spectrum	1988	Fuxoft	A sequel to Planet of Shades.
Rychle Sipy 1	Text adventure	ZX Spectrum	1988	Májasoft and CIDsoft	Inspired by Jaroslav Foglar's books about Rychlé šípy.
Belegost	Text adventure	ZX Spectrum, NeXTSTEP, MS-DOS, Windows	1989	Cybexlab; Fuxoft; T.R.C.	Inspired by J. R. R. Tolkien's books.
Tetris	Puzzle	Atari 8-bit	1989	HMC	Fred Brooker (Filip Oščádal).
Cesta Bojovníka	Fighting game	ZX Spectrum	1989	KM Soft	Re-released in 1992 by Ultrasoft.
Hlípa	Maze game	PMD 85, Atari ST, Sharp MZ	1989	4004/482 ZO Svazarmu	Inspired by Knight Lore.
Pomsta šíleného ataristy	Text adventure	Atari 8-bit	1989	Viktor Lošťák	
Atomix	Puzzle video game	ZX Spectrum	1990	Scorpion	The game was made according to Softtouch's Atomix. In 1991 re-released by Ultrasoft.
Double Dash	Arcade game	ZX Spectrum	1990	Fuxoft	Inspired by Boulder Dash.
Indiana Jones 3	Text adventure	ZX Spectrum	1990	Fuxoft	A parody of the Indiana Jones film series.
Star Dragon	Shoot 'em up	ZX Spectrum	1990	Scorpion	
Rychle Sipy 2	Text adventure	ZX Spectrum	1990	Májasoft and CIDsoft	Sequel to the 1988 game Rychle Sipy.
Tetris 2	Puzzle video game	ZX Spectrum	1990	Fuxoft	Inspired by a Soviet game Tetris.
Ataristův Protiútok	Text adventure	Atari 8-bit	1991	Viktor Lošťák	Sequel to Pomsta šíleného ataristy.
Hexagonia — Atomix 2	Puzzle video game	ZX Spectrum	1991	Scorpion	A sequel to Atomix.
Cervii	Arcade game	MS-DOS	1992	Vlaada Chvatil	
Crux 92	Action Puzzle video game	ZX Spectrum	1992	Stantz Software	
Perestrojka	Arcade game	ZX Spectrum	1992	GCC	Remake of a Soviet game Perestroika.
Microx	Puzzle	Atari 8-bit	1993	HMC (Filip Oščádal, Petr Klvač)	Remake of Atomix.
Muzeum mrtvol	Text adventure	MS-DOS	1993	Computer Experts	
Světák Bob	Adventure game	Amiga	1993	Bohewia Software	The first officially distributed video game developed in the Czech Republic.
Vlak	Arcade game	MS-DOS	1993	Miroslav Němeček	
Boovie	Puzzle video game	ZX Spectrum	1994	KVL	
Donkey Island	Adventure game	MS-DOS	1994	Pterodon	A parody of Monkey Island that was developed by Jarek Kolář and Petr Vlček.
Hlava Kasandry	Action-adventure game	Atari ST	1994	LetDisk	
Mavlin: Vesmírný únik	Adventure game	MS-DOS	1994	Mael Software Group	
Naturix	Platform	Atari 8-bit	1994	Raster Software	
OK Cash Machine	Simulation	MS-DOS	1994	Computer Experts	
Stíny Noci	Text adventure	MS-DOS	1994	Computer Experts	
7 days and 7 nights	Adventure game	MS-DOS	1995	Pterodon (with Filip Oščádal)	Erotic adventure game.
Achtung, die Kurve!	Strategy video game	MS-DOS	1995	Filip Oščádal and Kamil Doležal	Also known as Zatacka or Achtung. Now known as Curve Fever.
Dragon History	Adventure game	MS-DOS	1995	NoSense	The first Czech video game released on CD.
Gravon: Real Virtuality	Action Simulation	Atari ST, Windows	1995	Suma	A spiritual predecessor to Operation Flashpoint: Cold War Crisis.
Magic Island: The Secret of Stones	Role-playing video	Amiga	1995	Arda Team	
Mise Quadam	Adventure game	MS-DOS	1995	Agawa	The first game with anti-tamper software.
Paranoia	Real-time strategy	MS-DOS	1995	Phoenix Arts	Inspired by Dune II.
Catapult	Arcade game	MS-DOS	1996	NoSense	
Colony 28	Action-adventure game	MS-DOS	1996	Napoleon Games	
The Knights of the Grail	Role-playing video	Windows	1996	Centauri Production	The first Czech dungeon game.
Oil Empire	Adventure Strategy video game	MS-DOS	1996	88th Panzer Division	Inspired by Oil Imperium.
Paranoia II	Real-time strategy	MS-DOS	1996	Phoenix Arts	
Swigridova pomsta'	Adventure game	MS-DOS	1996	Agawa	
Turbo Speedway	Race game	MS-DOS	1996	WSS	
Testament	First-person shooter	Amiga	1996	Insanity	
Ve stínu magie	Role-playing video game	Amiga	1996	Division	
Unlimited Warriors	Fighting game	MS-DOS	1996	Digitalica	Inspired by Mortal Kombat.
Asmodeus: Tajemný kraj Ruthaniolu	Action-adventure game	MS-DOS	1997	NoSense	The last game by NoSense.
Colony 28	Action-adventure game	MS-DOS	1997	Napoleon Games	
Edna	Action-adventure game	MS-DOS	1997	Black Raven	
Gooka	Adventure game	Windows	1997	JRC Interactive; Cinemax	
Lurid Land	Puzzle video game	MS-DOS	1997	Illusion Softworks	
Mutarium	Real-time strategy	MS-DOS	1997	Zima Software	
Paranoia II	Real-time strategy	MS-DOS	1997	Phoenix Arts	
Prokletí Eridenu	Role-playing video	MS-DOS	1997	Napalm Soft	
Testament II	First-person shooter	Amiga	1997	Insanity	Sequel to Testament.
Argo Adventure	Adventure game	Windows	1998	BBS Software	
Boovie 2	Puzzle video game	ZX Spectrum	1998	E.S.A. Productions	A sequel to the 1994 video game.
Boovie (Remake)	Puzzle video game	MS-DOS	1998	Future Games	A remake of the 1994 video game.
Dung-beetles aka The Mystery of A Comic	Adventure game	Windows	1998	Centauri Production	
Fish Fillets	Puzzle video game	Cross-platform	1998	Altar Interactive	
Gates of Skeldal	Role-playing video	Windows, iOS, Android	1998	Napoleon Games	Android and iOS version of game was funded by crowdfunding campaign on Czech site Startovac.cz.
Hesperian Wars	Real-time strategy	Windows	1998	Pterodon	
Hot Summer	Adventure game	Windows	1998	Maxon	The first installment in Hot Summer series.
Hovniválové aneb Záhada komixu	Adventure game		1998	Centauri Production	
Husita	Real-time strategy	Windows	1998	Phoenix Arts; Cinemax	
Messenger of the Gods	Adventure game	MS-DOS	1998	Future Games	
Polda	Adventure game	Windows, iOS	1998	Sleepteam Labs	
Signus: The Artefact Wars	Turn-based strategy	Windows	1998	Valacirca; Zima Software	
Hidden & Dangerous	Tactical shooter	Windows, Dreamcast, PlayStation	1999	Illusion Softworks	One of the first Czech games to be successful abroad. In 2004 released as freeware.
Hot Summer 2	Adventure game	Windows	1999	Centauri Production	
HyperCore: Out of Dimension	Arcade game	MS-DOS	1999	Zima Software	
In the Raven Shadow	Adventure game	Windows	1999	Rainbow Rhino; Cinemax	Developed primarily by Slovak company Rainbow Rhino.
Jakub a Terezka	Adventure game	Windows	1999	Centauri Production	Adventure game with anti-drug theme.
Polda 2	Adventure game	Windows, iOS	1999	Zima Software	
Twilight	Adventure game	Windows	1999	Numedia	
Fairy Tale About Father Frost, Ivan and Nastya	Adventure game	Windows, iOS	2000	Centauri Production	Released for iOS in 2011 as Father Frost.
Flying Heroes	Action	Windows	2000	Pterodon; Illusion Softworks	
Polda 3	Adventure game	Windows, iOS	2000	Zima Software	
Bulánci	Action Arcade game	Windows	2001	Sleepteam labs	
Hunting Unlimited	Simulation	Windows	2001	SCS Software	
Operation Flashpoint: Cold War Crisis	Tactical shooter	Windows, Xbox	2001	Bohemia Interactive	
Original War	Real-time strategy Role-playing video	Windows	2001	Altar Interactive	Story is inspired by the novel The Last Day of Creation.
State of War	Real-time strategy	Windows	2001	Cinemax; Cypron Studios	Developed primarily by Slovak developer Cypron Studios.
4 Leaf Clovers	Adventure game	Windows	2002–2005	Centauri Production	Episodic game based on the comics Čtyřlístek.
Duke Nukem: Manhattan Project	Action	Windows, Xbox 360	2002	SCS Software; Sunstorm Interactive	Developed primarily by US company Sunstorm Interactive.
Hard Truck: 18 Wheels of Steel	Simulation	Windows	2002	SCS Software	The first game in 18 Wheels of Steel series.
The Fifth Disciple	Action-adventure game	Windows	2002	Napoleon Games; Centauri Production	Sequel to Gates of Skeldal.
Mafia	Third-person shooter	Windows, PlayStation 2, Xbox	2002	Illusion Softworks	Often mentioned as the best Czech video game. The first installment in Mafia series.
Necromania: Trap of Darkness	Role-playing video	Windows	2002	Cinemax; Darksoft Game Development Studio	Developed primarily by Slovak video game developer Darksoft Game Development Studio.
Operation Flashpoint: Resistance	Tactical shooter	Windows, Xbox	2002	Bohemia Interactive	An expansion pack to Operation Flashpoint: Cold War Crisis.
Polda 4	Adventure game	Windows, iOS	2002	Zima Software	
U.S. Special Forces: Team Factor	Multiplayer First-person shooter	Windows	2002	7FX	Intended to be a competitor to Counter-Strike.
18 Wheels of Steel: Across America	Simulation	Windows	2003	SCS Software	The second game in 18 Wheels of Steel series.
The Black Mirror	Adventure game	Windows	2003	Future Games	Sequels to the game developed by German developer Cranberry Production.
Domestic Violence: Game over	Simulation	Windows	2003	Centauri Production	Sims-like game against domestic violence funded by Czech Government.
Ferdy the Ant	Arcade game	Windows	2003–2005	Centauri Production	Episodic game based on the Czech fairytale Ferda Mravenec by Ondřej Sekora.
Vietcong	Tactical shooter	Windows, PlayStation 2, Xbox	2003	Pterodon; Illusion Softworks	
Hidden & Dangerous 2	Tactical shooter	Windows	2003	Illusion Softworks	Sequel to Hidden & Dangerous.
Hunting Unlimited 2	Simulation	Windows	2003	SCS Software	
Samorost	Adventure game	Windows, iOS	2003	Amanita Design	The first instalment in the Samorost series.
Troll	Arcade game	Windows	2003	Rake in Grass	
UFO: Aftermath	Strategy video game	Windows	2003	Altar Interactive	
18 Wheels of Steel: Pedal to the Metal	Simulation	Windows	2004	SCS Software	
Bloodline	Action-adventure game	Windows	2004	Zima Software	
Gooka — The Mystery of Janatris	Action-adventure game	Windows	2004	Centauri Production	Sequel to Gooka.
Hunting Unlimited 3	Simulation	Windows	2004	SCS Software	
Jets'n'Guns	Shoot 'em up	Windows, OS X, Linux	2004	Rake in Grass	Soundtrack composed and performed by Machinae Supremacy.
The Quest for the Rest	Adventure game	Windows	2004	Amanita Design	
Rocketman	Adventure game	Windows	2004	Amanita Design	
Shade: Wrath of Angels	Action-adventure game	Windows	2004	Black Element Software	
Wings of War	Air combat game	Windows; Xbox	2004	Silver Wish Games	
Vietcong: Fist Alpha	Tactical shooter	Windows, PlayStation 2, Xbox	2004	Pterodon; Illusion Softworks	An expansion pack to Vietcong.
18 Wheels of Steel: Convoy	Simulation	Windows	2005	SCS Software	
Bonez Adventures: Tomb of Fulaos	Action-adventure game	Windows	2005	Bones Artz	
Cardhalia	Role-playing video	Windows	2005	Calimero Industries	
Chameleon	Stealth game	Windows	2005	Silver Wish Games	Developed primarily by a Slovak subsidiary of Illusion Softworks that was defunct at the time of release.
Circus Empire	Business simulation game	Windows	2005	Silver Wish Games	Developed primarily by a Slovak subsidiary of Illusion Softworks that was defunct at the time of release.
Cold War	Stealth game	Windows	2005	Mindware Studios	
Daemonica	Action-adventure game	Windows	2005	Cinemax; RA Images	
Evil Days of Luckless John	Action-adventure game	Windows	2005	Centauri Production	Prequel to Hot Summer.
NiBiRu: Age of Secrets	Adventure game	Windows	2005	Future Games	
Polda 5	Adventure game	Windows, iOS	2005	Zima Software	
Samorost 2	Adventure game	Windows, OS X, Linux, iOS	2005	Amanita Design	
UFO: Aftershock	Strategy video game	Windows	2005	Altar Interactive	
Vietcong 2	Tactical shooter	Windows	2005	Pterodon; Illusion Softworks	
18 Wheels of Steel: Haulin'	Simulation	Windows	2006	SCS Software	
ARMA: Armed Assault	Tactical shooter	Windows	2006	Bohemia Interactive	First game in the ARMA series.
El Matador	Third-person shooter	Windows	2006	Plastic Reality	
Fireman's Adventures	Arcade game	Windows	2006	Rake in Grass	
Gumboy: Crazy Adventures	Arcade game	Windows	2006	Cinemax	Received Game of the Year 2006 award from GameTunnel.
Hunting Unlimited 4	Simulation	Windows	2006	SCS Software	
The Ro(c)k Con Artist	Action	Windows	2006	Centauri Production	Based on a Czech film of the same name.
Styrateg	Role-playing video Turn-based strategy	Windows, Mac OS	2006	Rake in Grass	
Undercroft	Role-playing video	Windows, iOS	2006	Rake in Grass	
Ghost in the Sheet	Adventure game	Windows	2007	CBE Software	
18 Wheels of Steel: American Long Haul	Simulation	Windows	2007	SCS Software	
Alpha Prime	First-person shooter	Windows	2007	Black Element Software	The script of story was written by Ondřej Neff.
ARMA: Queen's Gambit	Tactical shooter	Windows	2007	Bohemia Interactive	An expansion pack to ARMA: Armed Assault.
Bus Driver	Simulation	Windows	2007	SCS Software	
Fish Fillets 2	Puzzle video game	Windows	2007	Altar Games	
Gumboy: Crazy Features	Arcade game	Windows	2007	Cinemax	Freeware version of Gumboy: Crazy Adventures.
Hunting Unlimited 2008	Simulation	Windows	2007	SCS Software	
King Mania	Strategy video game	Windows, OS X	2007	Rake in Grass	
Next Life	Adventure game	Windows	2007	Future Games	
Painkiller: Overdose	First-person shooter	Windows	2007	Mindware Studios	A stand-alone expansion to Painkiller.
State of War 2: Arcon	Real-time strategy	Windows	2007	Cinemax; Cypron Studios	Developed primarily by Slovak developer Cypron Studios.
UFO: Afterlight	Strategy video game	Windows	2007	Altar Games	
UFO: Extraterrestrials	Strategy video game	Windows	2007	Chaos Concept	
Archibald's Adventures	Action Puzzle video game	Windows, OS X, iOS, PlayStation Portable	2008	Rake in Grass	
Euro Truck Simulator	Simulation	Windows	2008	SCS Software	
Tale of a Hero	Adventure game	Windows	2008	Future Games	
Gumboy Tournament	Multiplayer Arcade game	Windows	2008	Cinemax	A sequel to Gumboy: Crazy Adventures.
Hunting Unlimited 2009	Simulation	Windows	2008	SCS Software	
Larva Mortus	Action	Windows	2008	Rake in Grass	
Memento Mori	Adventure game	Windows	2008	Centauri Production	
MotorM4X: Offroad Extreme	Racing video game	Windows	2008	The Easy Company	
Questionaut	Educational Adventure game	Windows	2008	Amanita Design	
15 Blocks Puzzle	Puzzle video game	iOS	2009	Mad Finger Games	
18 Wheels of Steel: Extreme Trucker	Simulation	Windows	2009	SCS Software	
33rd Division	Stealth game	iOS	2009	Craneballs Studio	A reboot of the game was released in 2013.
ARMA 2	Tactical shooter	Windows	2009	Bohemia Interactive	Sequel to ARMA: Armed Assault.
Axel & Pixel	Adventure game	Windows, Xbox 360	2009	Silver Wish Games	A graphics adventure game that resembles the Samorost games.
Be a King: Lost Lands	Strategy video game	Windows	2009	Rake in Grass	
Blimp: The Flying Adventures	Arcade game	PlayStation 3, PlayStation Portable, PlayStation Vita	2009	Craneballs Studio	
Buka	Shoot 'em up	Android, iOS, Windows Phone	2009	Hexage	The first title by Hexage.
Dreamkiller	First-person shooter	Windows	2009	Mindware Studios	
Hunting Unlimited 2010	Simulation	Windows	2009	SCS Software	
Inquisitor	Role-playing video	Windows	2009	Cinemax	Game was in development for almost 10 years.
Machinarium	Adventure game	Windows, OS X, Linux, PlayStation 3, PlayStation Vita, IPad 2, BlackBerry PlayBook, Android, iOS, Nintendo Switch	2009	Amanita Design	Won the Excellence in Visual Art award at the 12th Annual Independent Games Festival.
Numen: Contest of Heroes	Role-playing video	Windows	2009	Cinemax	Inspired by Greek mythology.
Puzzle Rocks	Puzzle video game	Windows, iOS	2009	Cinemax	
Samurai: Way of the Warrior	Action	iOS	2009	Mad Finger Games	
Shy Dwarf	Platform game	Windows	2009	Amanita Design	
Totemo	Puzzle video game	Android, iOS, Windows Phone, Windows, OS X	2009	Hexage	
5-in-1 Arcade Hits	Arcade game	PlayStation Portable, PlayStation Vita	2010	Grip Games	
Alter Ego	Adventure game	Windows	2010	Future Games	The last game developed by Future Games.
Alternativa	Adventure game	Windows	2010	Centauri Production	Originally planned as a first game in video game series.
ARMA 2: Operation Arrowhead	Tactical shooter	Windows	2010	Bohemia Interactive	An expansion pack to ARMA 2.
Be a King 2	Strategy video game	Windows	2010	Rake in Grass	
Evac	Maze game	Android, iOS, Windows Phone, Windows, OS X	2010	Hexage	A Pac-Man clone.
Everlands	Turn-based strategy	Android, iOS, Windows Phone, Windows, OS X	2010	Hexage	
Family Farm	Social simulation game	Windows, Linux, OS X	2010	Hammerware	Designed by Vlaada Chvatil.
German Truck Simulator	Simulation	Windows	2010	SCS Software	
Mafia II	Third-person shooter	Windows, OS X, Xbox 360, PlayStation 3	2010	2K Czech	Sequel to Mafia: The City of Lost Heaven.
PacIn: Revenge of Nermesssis	Maze game	Windows	2010	FiolaSoft Studio	Inspired by Pac-Man.
Pound of Ground	Third-person shooter	Windows	2010	Centauri Production	Sequel to Evil Days of Luckless John.
SuperRope	Arcade game	Android, iOS	2010	Craneballs Studio	
UK Truck Simulator	Simulation	Windows	2010	SCS Software	
Monorace	Infinite runner	iOS	2010	Craneballs Studio	
Radiant	Shoot 'em up	Android, iOS, Windows Phone, Windows, OS X	2010	Hexage	
Samurai II: Vengeance	Action	iOS, Windows, OS X	2010	Madfinger Games	Sequel to Samurai: Way of the Warrior.
Shadowgun	Third-person shooter	iOS, Android, Ouya, BlackBerry 10, GameStick	2011	Madfinger Games	
Sokomania	Puzzle video game	Nintendo DS	2010	Cinemax	
18 Wheels of Steel: Extreme Trucker 2	Simulation	Windows	2011	SCS Software	
ARMA 2: Firing Range	Shooter game	Android, iOS	2011	Bohemia Interactive	Spin-off from the ARMA series.
Gyro13	Action Puzzle video game	iOS	2011	Cinemax	
Infinitum	Realtime Strategy	Browser	2011	Allodium	
One Epic Game	Ininite Runner	PlayStation Portable, PlayStation 3	2011	Grip Games	
OverKill	Rail shooter	Android, iOS	2011	Craneballs Studio	The first game in the OverKill series.
Pool Live Tour	Sports game	Android (operating system), iOS	2011	Geewa	
Robotek	Action Strategy video game	Android, iOS, Windows Phone, Windows, OS X	2011	Hexage	
Rune Legend	Puzzle video game	Windows Phone	2011	Dreadlocks Ltd	
Rush'n Attack: Ex-Patriot	Platform game	PlayStation 3, Xbox 360	2011	Vatra Games	A sequel to Rush'n Attack.
Thor: Son of Asgard	Action-adventure	iOS	2011	Disney Mobile Studios	
Top Spin 4	Sports game	Xbox 360, PlayStation 3, Wii	2011	2K Czech	Elected in Booom competition to be the best Czech video game of 2011.
Take On Helicopters	Simulation	Windows	2011	Bohemia Interactive	First game in the "Take On" series.
Botanicula	Adventure game	Windows, Linux, OS X, iOS, IPad	2012	Amanita Design	Elected in Booom competition to be the Best Czech video game of 2012.
Carrier Command: Gaea Mission	Real-time strategy Action	Windows, Xbox 360	2012	Bohemia Interactive	A remake of a 1988 video game Carrier Command. Selected to be the 3rd best Czech video game of the year.
Dead Trigger	First-person shooter	iOS, Android, Windows	2012	Madfinger Games	The first game in the Dead Trigger series.
Decathlon 2012	Sports game	Nintendo DS	2012	Cinemax	
Euro Truck Simulator 2	Simulation	Windows	2012	SCS Software	Selected to be the 2nd best Czech video game of the year.
Fish Heroes	Arcade game Puzzle video game	Android, iOS	2012	Craneballs Studio	Inspired by Angry Birds.
J.U.L.I.A.	Puzzle video game Adventure game	Windows, OS X	2012	CBE Software	
J.U.L.I.A. Untold	Puzzle video game Adventure game	Windows, OS X, iOS	2012	CBE Software	A spin-off from J.U.L.I.A.
Memento Mori 2	Adventure game	Windows	2012	Centauri Production	
Miner Wars Arena	Arcade game	Windows	2012	Keen Software House	A spin-off from Miner Wars 2081.
Miner Wars 2081	Space shooter	Windows	2012	Keen Software House	
Nyrthos	Role playing video game	Windows, iOS, Android, Mac OS	2012	BeerDeer Games	
OverKill 2	Rail shooter	Android, iOS	2012	Craneballs Studio	Sequel to OverKill.
Pirates Poker	Card game	Facebook	2012	Geewa	
Radiant Defense	Tower defense	Android, iOS, Windows Phone, Windows, OS X	2012	Hexage	A sequel to Radiant.
Retro Decathlon 2012	Sports game	Nintendo DS	2012	Cinemax	
Shadowgun: Deadzone	Multiplayer Third-person shooter	iOS, Android, Windows, Facebook	2012	Madfinger Games	Multiplayer spin-off from Shadowgun.
Silent Hill: Downpour	Survival horror	PlayStation 3, Xbox 360	2012	Vatra Games	The eighth installment in the Silent Hill video game series.
Vampires!	Strategy video game	Windows, OS X, iOS, Android	2012	CBE Software	Released as Crazy Vampires on mobile devices.
247 Missiles	Arcade game	iOS	2013	Cinemax	
Age of Defenders	Arcade game	Browser	2013	Geewa	
ARMA Tactics	Turn-based strategy	Nvidia Shield, Android, iOS, Windows	2013	Bohemia Interactive	Spin-off from the ARMA series.
ARMA 3	Tactical shooter	Windows	2013	Bohemia Interactive	Third instalment in the ARMA series.
Atomic Ninjas	Action; Arcade game	PlayStation Vita, PlayStation 3	2013	Grip Games	
Boredom of Augustín Cordes	Adventure game	Windows	2013	CBE Software	Described by developers as a freeware boredom simulator.
Coraabia RPCG	Online game, Card game, Role-playing video	Browser game	2013	ARK8	
Dark Lands	Ininite Runner	Windows Phone	2013	Mingle Games	
Dead Effect	First-person shooter	iOS, Android, Windows	2013	inDev Brain	
Dead Trigger 2	First-person shooter	iOS, Android, Windows, OS X	2013	Madfinger Games	
Fallout 1.5: Resurrection	Role-playing video game	Windows	2013	Resurrection Team	A mod for Fallout 2.
Hero of Many	Action-adventure game	iOS, Android, OS X, Windows	2013	Trickster Arts	Often referred as one of the best Android games of 2013.
Hexee — smash the match	Puzzle video game	iOS	2013	Cinemax	
Mimpi	Platform game Adventure game Puzzle video game	Windows, OS X, Linux, Android, iOS	2013	Silicon Jelly	The game was originally to be funded by Indiegogo, but the campaign was unsuccessful.
Mimpi Hidden Objects	Hidden object game	iOS	2013	Silicon Jelly	Spin-off from Mimpi.
Mimpi Signal	Puzzle video game	iOS	2013	Silicon Jelly	Spin-off from Mimpi.
Mimpi Volleyball	Sports game Arcade game	iOS	2013	Silicon Jelly	Spin-off from Mimpi.
Munchie Mania	Puzzle video game	iOS; Facebook	2013	Geewa	
On Words	Puzzle video game	iOS, Facebook	2013	Geewa	
Reaper: Tale of a Pale Swordsman	Action role-playing game	Android, iOS, Windows Phone, Windows, OS X, BlackBerry 10	2013	Hexage	
Skeldal Pexeso	Concentration (Pexeso)	iOS, Android	2013	Napoleon Games	An advertising game promoting the crowdfunding campaign for the mobile version of Gates of Skeldal.
Toy Story: Smash It!	Arcade game	Android, iOS	2013	Disney Mobile Studios	
TurtleStrike	Turn-based strategy	iOS, Android	2013	eeGon Games	
Galaxy Trucker	Strategy video game	iOS, Android	2014	Czech Games Edition	Awarded for Readers Choice by Board Game Geek and for the best Czech video game of the year by Games.cz.
J.U.L.I.A. Among the Stars	Puzzle video game Adventure game	Windows, OS X, Linux	2014	CBE Software	A remake of J.U.L.I.A.
Jet Car Stunts	Racing video game	Windows, PlayStation 3, PlayStation 4, PlayStation Vita, Xbox 360	2014	Grip Games	A remake of the 2008 video game of the same name.
The Keep	Role-playing video game	Nintendo 3DS, IPad, Windows	2014	Cinemax	
Loot Hunter	Role-playing video game	Windows, OS X	2014	Rake in Grass	
Monzo	Puzzle video game	IOS, Android	2014	Madfinger Games	
OverKill 3	Rail shooter	Android, iOS	2014	Craneballs Studio	Third instalment in the OverKill series.
OverKill Mafia	Rail shooter	Android, iOS	2014	Craneballs Studio	Spin-off from OverKill.
Polda 6	Adventure game	Windows, iOS	2014	Zima Software	
Sokomania 2: Cool Job	Puzzle video game	Nintendo DS	2014	Cinemax	
Tile On	Puzzle video game	iOS	2014	Geewa	
Wormi	Arcade game	iOS	2014	Cinemax	Inspired by Snafu.
Blackhole	Platform game	Windows, Linux, OS X	2015	FiolaSoft Studio	
Dark Lands Smasher	Arcade game	Windows Phone	2015	Mingle Games	A spin-off to the 2013 game Dark Lands
Dead Effect 2	First-person shooter	iOS, Android, Windows	2015	BadFly interactive	
Delta Force Army Training	First-person shooter	iOS, Android	2015	Craneballs Studio	
Dex	Action role-playing game	Windows, Linux, OS X, Ouya, Nintendo Switch	2015	Dreadlocks Ltd	Funded by a Kickstarter campaign.
The Great Wobo Escape	Stealth game	Android	2015	Gamifi.cc	
Mimpi Dreams	Platform game Adventure game Puzzle video game	iOS	2015	Silicon Jelly	Sequel to Mimpi.
Pool Live Tour 2	Sports game	Android (operating system), iOS	2015	Geewa	
Prima Kvizy	Puzzle video game	Android	2015	Geewa	
Rampage Knights	Arcade game	Windows	2015	Rake in Grass	Inspired by The Binding of Isaac and Golden Axe.
Rememoried	Adventure game	Windows	2015	Hangonit	
Splash Cars	Arcade game	Android, iOS	2015	Craneballs Studio	
Toby: The Secret Mine	Action adventure	Windows, Nintendo Switch	2015	Lukáš Navrátil	
Unkilled	First-person shooter	iOS, Android	2015	Madfinger Games	
7 Mages	Role-playing video game	iOS, Android, OS X, Windows	2016	Napoleon Games	Third instalment in the Gates of Skeldal series.
American Truck Simulator	Simulation	Windows	2016	SCS Software	Spiritual successor to the 18 Wheels of Steel series.
ARMA: Mobile OPS	Massively multiplayer online game	iOS	2016	Bohemia Interactive	armamobileops.com official site Resembles Clash of Clans.
Chameleon Run	Infinite runner	iOS, Nintendo Switch	2016	Hyperbolic Magnetism	
Dark Train	Adventure Puzzle video game	Windows	2016	Paperash Studio	
Hackers	Online Strategy Game	Android, iOS	2016	Trickster Arts	
Mafia III	Third-person shooter	Windows	2016	Hangar 13; 2K Czech	
Ninja Madness	Platform game	iOS, Android	2016	Craneballs Studio	
REDCON	Real time strategy	Android, Windows	2016	Hexage	
Renoir	Action-adventure game	Windows	2016	Soulbound Games	Finished by Black Wing Studio.
Samorost 3	Adventure game	Windows	2016	Amanita Design	
The Solus Project	Action-adventure game	Windows, Xbox One	2016	Grip Games; Teotl Studios	
Space Merchants: Arena	Action game	Windows	2016	Playito	
Tiny Miners	Arcade game	Android, iOS	2016	About Fun	
Trupki	Puzzle Game	Android	2016	plugnplug	
Void Raiders	Action	Windows	2016	Tryzna83	
Argo	Multiplayer FPS	Windows	2017	Bohemia Interactive	
Attentat 1942	Adventure game	Windows, iOS, Nintendo Switch	2017	Charles University	
Blue Effect VR	Action	Windows	2017	DIVR Labs	
Skylar & Plux: Adventure on Clover Island	3D platform game	Windows, PlayStation 4, Xbox One	2017	Grip Digital, Right Nice Games	
Take On Mars	Simulation	Windows	2017	Bohemia Interactive	Second game in the Take On series.
WarFriends	Action	Android, iOS	2017	About Fun	
Aggressors: Ancient Rome	Turn-based strategy	Windows	2018	Kubat Software	Won the Best Game design award at Casual Connect Europe 2019.
The Apartment	Adventure game	Windows	2018	Shattered Mirror	
Band of Defenders	First-person shooter	Windows	2018	Alda Games	
Beat Saber	Music game	Windows, PlayStation 4	2018	Beat Games	
Chuchel	Puzzle video game	Windows	2018	Amanita Design	
DayZ	MMO Survival horror	Windows	2018	Bohemia Interactive	
Heroes of Flatlandia	Turn-based strategy	iOS, Android	2018	Highland Studio	
Kingdom Come: Deliverance	Role-playing video game	Windows, PlayStation 4, Xbox One, Nintendo Switch	2018	Warhorse Studios	The game raised £1,106,371 on Kickstarter, with an original goal of £300,000.
Mothergunship	First-person shooter	Windows, PlayStation 4, Xbox One	2018	Grip Digitall; Terrible Posture Games	
Project Hospital	Simulation, Strategy	Windows	2018	Oxymoron Games	
Shadowgun Legends	First-person shooter	iOS, Android	2018	Madfinger Games	Sequel to Shadowgun.
Feudal Alloy	RPG Platform game	Windows, PlayStation 4, Xbox One, Nintendo Switch	2019	Attu Games	
Jim is Moving Out	Platform Puzzle video game	Windows, Nintendo Switch	2019	Cinemax	
Monolisk	RPG	iOS, Android	2019	Trickster Arts	
Pilgrims	Adventure game	iOS, Windows, MacOS, Linux, Nintendo Switch	2019	Amanita Design	
Planet Nomads	Sandbox game	Windows, OS X	2019	Craneballs Studio	
Ritual: Sorcerer Angel	RPG Action game	Windows, Android, iOS	2019	Hexage	
Space Engineers	Sandbox game	Windows	2019	Keen Software House	Won the "4th best Indie Game of 2013" award from IndieDB.
Vigor	Survival game	Xbox One, Nintendo Switch	2019	Bohemia Interactive	
Halloween Brick Breaker	Arcade game	Windows, Android	2019	Moravia Games	
Ylands	Sandbox game	Windows	2019	Bohemia Interactive	
Creaks	Puzzle platformer	Windows, iOS, Nintendo Switch	2020	Amanita Design	Won the Czech Game of the Year in 2020.
Factorio	Action; Real-time strategy	Windows, Linux, OS X	2020	Wube Software Ltd	Funded by an Indiegogo campaign.
Imperiums: Greek Wars	Turn-based strategy	Windows	2020	Kube Games	Sequel to Aggressors: Ancient Rome.
Jets'n'Guns 2	Shoot 'em up	Windows	2020	Rake in Grass	Sequel to Jets'n'Guns.
Mafia: Definitive Edition	Third-person shooter	Windows	2020	Hangar 13	Remake of Mafia: The City of Lost Heaven
Medieval Engineers	Sandbox game	Windows	2020	Keen Software House	
Ministry of Broadcast	Platform game	Windows, Nintendo Switch	2020	Ministry of Broadcast Studio	
Someday You'll Return	Adventure game	Windows, PlayStation 4, Xbox One	2020	CBE Software	First-person psychological horror game.
UFO2Extraterrestrials: Battle for Mercury	Strategy video game	Windows	2020	Chaos Concept	Prequel to UFO: Extraterrestrials.
Comanche (2020)	Simulation, Action	Windows	2021	Ashborne Games; Nukklear	7th core game in "Comanche" series.
Happy Game	Adventure game	Windows, iOS, Nintendo Switch	2021	Amanita Design	
Hobo: Tough Life	Role-playing video game	Windows, Nintendo Switch	2021	T4J, Moravia Tales	Survival RPG where player controls a homeless man.
Nebuchnadnezzar	City-builder	Windows, Linux	2021	Nepos Games	Set in the Mesopotamian era.
Silent Sector	Action	Windows	2021	Rake in Grass	
Svoboda 1945: Liberation	Adventure game	Windows, iOS, Nintendo Switch	2021	Charles Games	Sequel to Attentat 1942.
1428: Shadows over Silesia	Action-adventure game	Windows	2022	KUBI Games	Set during Hussite Wars.
Afterglitch	Adventure game	Windows	2022	Hangonit	
Expedition Zero	Survival horror game	Windows	2022	Enigmatic Machines	
FixFox	Action-adventure game	Windows	2022	Rendlike	
Leave No One Behind: la Drang	Real-time strategy	Windows	2022	Gaming 301	
Polda 7	Adventure game	Windows, iOS	2022	Zima Software	
ARMA Reforger	Tactical shooter	Windows, macOS, and Linux	2023	Bohemia Interactive	Part of ARMA series.
Beecarbonize	Simulation	Windows	2023	Charles Games	
Crime Boss: Rockay City	Action	Windows	2023	Ingame Studios	
Bzzzt	Platform game	Windows, macOS, Linux, Nintendo Switch	2023	Ko.dll; Cinemax	
Hrot	Action	Windows	2023	Spytihněv	
Last Train Home	Strategy game	Windows	2023	Ashborne Games	
Bulánci 2	Action Arcade game	Windows, Nintendo Switch	2023	SleepTeam	
Playing Kafka	Adventure	Windows, iOS	2024	Charles Games	
Absolute Full Life	Action Puzzle video game	Windows	2024	TheOnlyWayOut	
Flying Tank	Shoot 'em up	Windows	2024	Hexage	
Kubikon 3D	Puzzle game	Windows	2024	KUBI Games	
Kvark	Action game	Windows	2024	Perun Creative; Latest Past	
Mourning Tide	Adventure	Windows	2024	Liquid Squid	
Shrot	Real-time strategy	Windows	2024	Spytihněv	
TopSpin 2K25	Sports game	Microsoft Windows, PlayStation 4, PlayStation 5, Xbox One, Xbox Series X/S	2024	Hangar 13	
Velvet 89	Adventure game	Windows	2024	Charles Games	
Panelak	Horror game	Windows	2024	Pajos games	
Bajka	Adventure game	Windows	2025	Hangonit	
Bellfortis	Strategy	Windows	2025	Rake in Grass	
The Book of Aaru	Action Role-playing video game	Windows	2025	Amenti Studio	
Hlína	Adventure game	Windows	2025	Omnia Ludus	Claymation adventure game.
Kingdom Come: Deliverance II	Role-playing video game	Windows, PlayStation 5, Xbox Series X/S	2025	Warhorse Studios	Sequel to Kingdom Come: Deliverance.
Luck & Loot	Role-playing video game	Windows	2025	SMARTcreative	Started as a Game jam title.
Mafia: The Old Country	Third-person shooter	Windows, PlayStation 5, Xbox Series X/S	2025	Hangar 13	Prequel to Mafia: The City of Lost Heaven.
Panzerkampf	Tank simulation game	Windows	2025	Krieg Games	
Playing Prague	Puzzle game	Android, iOS	2025	Charles Games	
Radiolight	Adventure game	Windows	2025	Krystof Knesl	
Rocket Boots Mania	3D Platform game	Windows	2025	Contra Concept	
S.T.A.L.K.E.R. 2: Heart of Chornobyl	Action game	Windows	2025	GSC Game World	Development largely moved to the Czech Republic due to Russian invasion of Ukraine.
Naplum actualy went dark (Naplum Actually Went Dark 1)	Rooms-lite	Windows, Mac, Android, iOS, Oculus, Xbox One, PlayStation 4, Rift	2025	Glass Jug Games	
Silicomrades	Action game	Windows	2025	Outside the Fox	Cooperative 2D shooter for two players.
Tribe Nation	Real-time strategy	Windows	2025	Random Worlds	
Brno Transit	Adventure	Windows	2026	Spytihněv	Psychological horror game set in fictional Brno Railway system.
Dreadline Express	Adventure game	Windows	2026	David Konečný	
Feed the Scorchpot	Windows	Rogue-lite strategy	2026	Moravian	Originally developed under title Dragon Fodder
Heroes of Science and Fiction	Turn-based strategy	Windows, macOS, and Linux	2026	Oxymoron Games	Originally known as Silence of the Siren.
Hubert	Adventure game	Windows	2026	Brocap Studio	
Microcivilization	Strategy game	Windows	2026	Ondrej Homola	
Polda 5.5	Adventure game	Windows	2026	Zima Software	
Polylithic	Survival game	Windows	2026	Polyperfect	
Phonopolis	Adventure game	Windows	2026	Amanita Design	
Scarlet Deer Inn	Adventure Platform game	Windows, PlayStation 4, Xbox One, Nintendo Switch	2026	Attu Games	
Silica	Real-time strategy Action	Windows, macOS, and Linux	2026	Bohemia Incubator	
Subsequence	Adventure game	Windows	2026	Zoemi Games	
Underkeep	Role-playing video game	Windows	2026	Rake in Grass	
Matcho	Action game	Windows	2027	Fiolasoft Studio	
MEDIEVAL	Action adventure	Windows, Xbox Series X/S, PlayStation 5	TBA, 2026	Cypronia	Developed by Slovak studio Cypronia in association with the Czech production staff of the Medieval (2022) movie.
Aledorn	Role-playing video game	Windows	TBA	Team21	
BLOODYXMAS	Action	iOS	N/A	Mad Finger Games	
Aledorn	Role-playing video game	Windows	TBA	Team21	
ARMA 4	Tactical shooter	Windows, macOS, and Linux	TBA	Bohemia Interactive	Fourth instalment in the ARMA series.
Automatica: Programmable Battle Droids	Tactical Puzzle game	Windows, macOS, and Linux	TBA	Cinemax	
Beware	Survival racing game	Windows, macOS, and Linux	TBA	Ondřej Švadlena	
Brahman: The Gate of Salvation	Action-adventure game	Windows, macOS, and Linux	TBA	Cinemax	
Brute Horse	Platformer	Windows	TBA	Place of Departure	
Cosmo tales	Action Adventure	Windows, macOS, and Linux	TBA	Bohemia Interactive	
County of Fortune	City-builder	Windows, Linux	TBA	Nepos Games	
Dark Train: Coupe	Text adventure	Windows	TBA	Paperash Studio	Prequel to the original Dark Train.
Dreadhunter	Action RPG game	Windows	TBA	Trickster Arts	
Gray Zone Warfare	Tactical shooter	Windows	TBA	Madfinger Games	
The Guild - Europa 1410	Life simulation game	Windows	TBA	Ashborne Games	
Knight's Path	Action RPG game	Windows	TBA	Jan Tichota, Aamn Chahrour	
Kromlech	Action RPG game	Windows	TBA	Perun Creative	
Magna Regna	Strategy video game	Windows	TBA	Hammer Games	
The Last Mile	Action Adventure	Windows, PlayStation 5, Xbox Series X/S	TBA	Frostember Studios	
Legacy of Valor	Action RPG Strategy game	Windows	TBA	Filip Husák	
Machinarium 2	Adventure game	Windows	TBA	Amanita Design	Sequel to Machinarium.
Mashinky	Strategy video game	Windows	TBA	Jan Zelený	
Messenger of Death: Blood Bond	Adventure game	Windows	TBA	Experience	Prequel of The Black Mirror
Novus Inceptio	MMORPG	Windows	TBA	McMagic	
Polda 8	Adventure game	Windows	TBA	Zima Software	
Prague Metro Simulator	Simulation	Windows	TBA	Prague Metro Team	
Songs of the Chalice	Real-time strategy Action	Windows	TBA	Vodasoft	3D Real-time strategy with tower defense mechanics, inspired by Hussite Wars.
Space Engineers 2	Sandbox game	Windows	TBA	Keen Software House	Sequel to Space Engineers
Stranded Deep 2	Survival	TBA	TBA	North Beach Games Prague	Sequel to Stranded Deep
TAUCETI Unknown Origin	First-person shooter	TBA	TBA	BadFly Interactive	
Uncracked	Platformer	Windows	TBA	Marty's Makings	
Unknown Operations: The Habitus	First-person shooter	Windows	TBA	JenTakStudioGames	
Vranygrai	Action Role-playing video game	Windows	TBA	Dire Badger Studio	
Wayward Terran Frontier: Zero Falls	Role-playing video game	Windows	TBA		A project of an American developer George Hultgren and a Czech developer Jan Orszulik.
Shadowless	Psychological horror	Windows	TBA	ultron01	The game is already available on Steam and can be added to wishlist
