= Video games in the Czech Republic =

The video game industry in the Czech Republic has produced numerous globally successful video games such as Operation Flashpoint: Cold War Crisis and the subsequent Arma series, the Mafia series, the Truck Simulator series, the Kingdom Come: Deliverance series, the Samorost series, Factorio, Space Engineers and others. There were 300–400 video game developers and around 30 video game companies focusing on video game development in 2014. In 2017, the country had 1,100 developers and 47 companies. Video games are also considered by some experts to be the country's biggest cultural export. The video game industry did not enjoy a good reputation and was unsupported by the state until 2013, when the Ministry of Industry and Trade started to seek ways to kickstart the economy. By 2014, programs were planned to support the video game industry.

In 2014, the Czech video game site Bonusweb ran a survey searching for the best video game developed in the Czech Republic and Slovakia. The winner was Mafia: The City of Lost Heaven, having received 3866 votes out of 13,143. Operation Flashpoint: Cold War Crisis placed second and Vietcong third. In 2019, Games.cz made a list of the 15 best video games developed in the Czech Republic. It was also topped by Mafia: The City of Lost Heaven.

== History ==
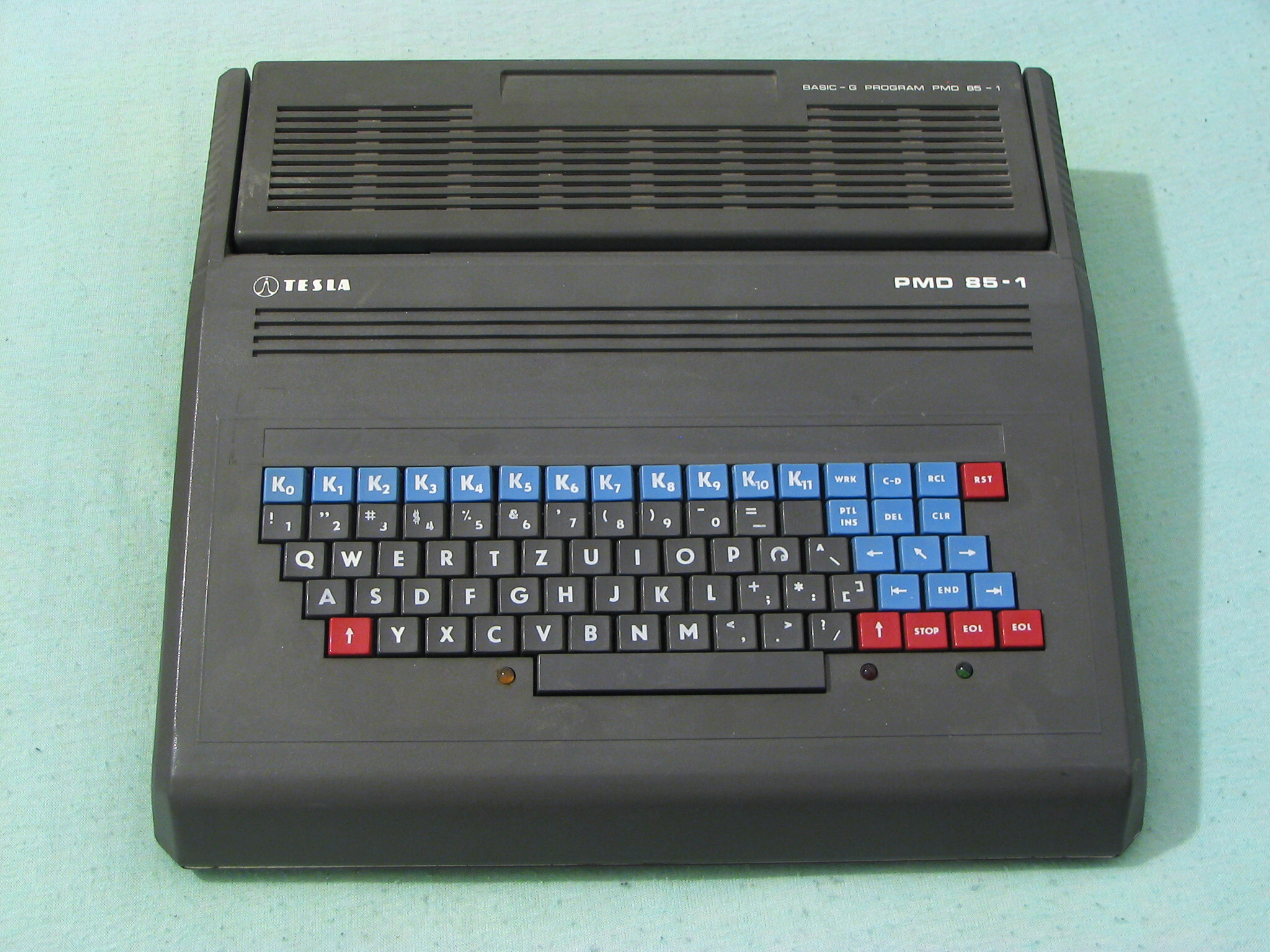
Czechoslovak personal computer PMD 85

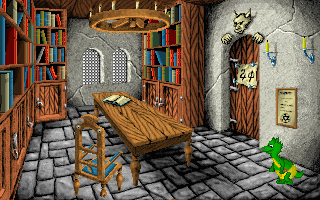
Dračí Historie (Dragon History) was the first Czech dubbed game on CD.

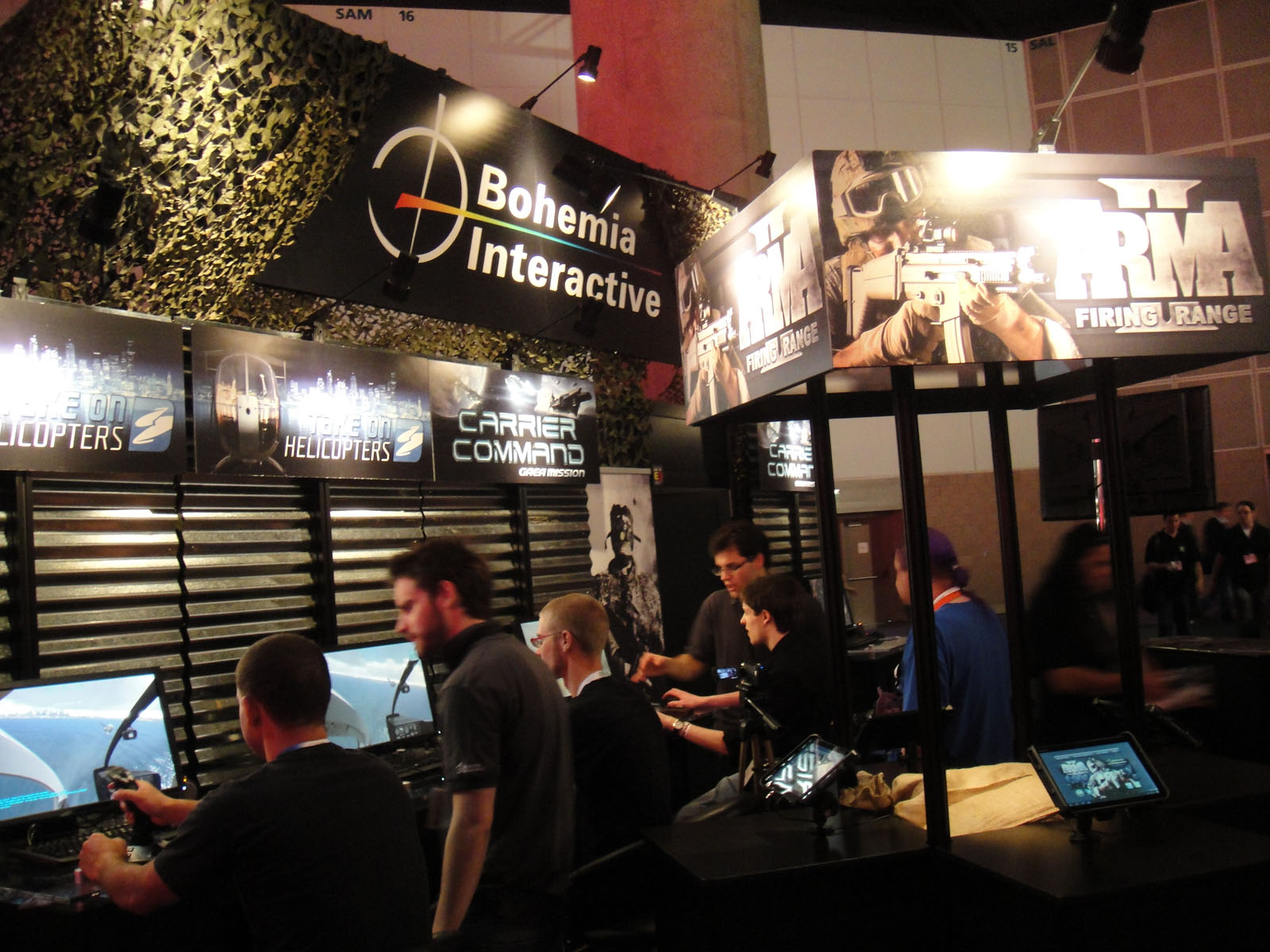
Bohemia Interactive booth on E3 2011

The first games were developed in Czechoslovakia during the late 1970s as part of experimentation with Czechoslovak computers SM 52/11 (minicomputer version of PDP-11). These titles lacked graphics and were not meant for wider distribution. Card games were particularly popular. Card games were played through printer due to lack of displays. There were also games based on chances such as electronical version of Rock–paper–scissors. Some games were competitive such as Dělostřelba (Cannonade) in which player had to count the trajectory of his cannon shot to hit his rival. Some games were developed on universities. Some universities taught programming at the time. Games at universities included Chess and Plivátko. The first real-time game was Přistání na měsíci (Landing on the Moon). One of the first games for character displays was Zombíci (Zombies). Players had to run for zombies and stay alive as long as possible.

In the 1980s, the first graphic video games development in the country were mostly part of the Svazarm clubs. The most popular video game platform of the time were ZX Spectrum, Czechoslovak computer PMD 85 and Atari 8-bit computers (mainly Atari 800XE). Hobbyists could come explore computing and teach themselves programming. Games developed by members of these clubs include Hlípa and Flappy. Text adventures were very popular, accounting for more than half of the total output of Czechoslovak programmers. Czechs produced games for these platforms even in 1990s when were outdated. After 1989, the market changed, improving opportunities for programmers and gamers alike.

In the 90's, the most known Czech video games are of the adventure type. During this period, the company Vochozka Trading was established, which first distributed games for Amiga computers, such as Světák Bob. The game was not successful; however, in 1994 Vochozka Trading released the first Czech commercial games for PC, two adventure titles – Tajemství Oslího ostrova (Donkey Island) and 7 dní a 7 nocí (Seven Days and Seven Nights). Both were developed by Pterodon and widely regarded as successes. This was followed by adventures like Dračí Historie (Dragon History, the first Czech dubbed game on CD, 1995), Gooka (the first Czech game on Windows, 1997), Horké léto (Hot Summer, 1997) and DreamLand: Final Solution (1999). Games released in the 1990s also include real-time strategy game Paranoia (1995) and RPG Brány Skeldalu (Gates of Skeldal, 1998). Among the most widespread Czech logical DOS games were also Vlak (Train, 1993), Achtung, die Kurve! (1995) and Boovie (1998). The game Polda was released in 1998, this was the beginning of the most popular Czech adventure series.

The first internationally successful Czech game was Hidden & Dangerous by Illusion Softworks, a third person action game released in 1999. More notable games by Illusion Softworks include Flying Heroes (2000), Mafia: The City of Lost Heaven (2002) and Vietcong (2003). In 2008 American publisher Take-Two Interactive acquired Illusion Softworks and renamed it to 2K Czech. The dark adventure Black Mirror from 2003 was a great success abroad, but two more sequels have already been made in Germany.

Bohemia Interactive became the most successful Czech developer with its worldwide bestseller Operation Flashpoint: Cold War Crisis and the series of Arma games, first released in 2006. The success of Bohemia Interactive is regarded as having overshadowed other independent development studios.

Czech development studios such as Amanita Design along with their Machinarium from 2009, ALTAR Games with its Original War and UFO series and SCS Software with its Euro Truck Simulator were established in these years.

In July 2011, several people formerly of 2K Czech and Bohemia Interactive opened Warhorse Studios, which produced Kingdom Come: Deliverance (2018).

== Consumer availability ==
The video game market in the Czech Republic is currently growing, with a spend of 2.202 billion Czech koruna (CZK) across both the Czech Republic and Slovakia in 2011. The corresponding total for 2012 was 2.436 billion CZK, a growth of 10.6%.In 2024 the market grew to 9.18 billion CZK.Purchased video games made up one third of this amount.

The most popular genres among Czech players are action and sports games. The growth of the market is expected with next-generation consoles such as the PlayStation 4 and the Xbox One.

== Video game associations ==
Czech Games is a community of video game developers based in the Czech Republic. It was established in 2001 and since then has supported video game development beginners. It has its own forum where developers can share their experience and showcase their work. The association also organizes the Game Developers Session conference and the GAMEDAY Festival.

Video Game Industry Association of the Czech Republic and the Slovak Republic exists to promote video games in the two named countries. Video game developers, publishers, importers and distributors all belong to the organization. The association also organizes the BOOOM Contest.

MU Game Studies is an association composed of Masaryk University students and graduates. It aims to improve and support video game education at Czech universities.

== Education ==
Some Czech universities offer programs of study related to video games. These universities are Masaryk University in Brno, Charles University in Prague, University of West Bohemia in Plzeň, Czech Technical University in Prague and Academy of Performing Arts in Prague.

== Video game companies from the Czech Republic ==
Company	Location	Founded	Type
1C Publishing EU (Now Fulqrum Games)	Prague	2002	Publisher
2 Stupid Devs	Czech	2020	Developer, publisher
2K Czech	Brno	1997	Developer
About Fun	Prague	2011	Mobile game developer
Alda Games	Brno	2013	Mainly mobile game dev, publisher
Allodium Games	Prague	2007	Online game developer
Amanita Design	Brno	2001	Developer
Ashborne Games	Brno	2020	Developer
BeerDeer Games	Prague	2011	Developer
Blue Brain Games	Prague	2016	Developer
Bohemia Interactive	Prague	1999	Developer, publisher
Boomer Games s.r.o.	Prostějov	2021	Developer, publisher
CBE Software	Brno	2010	Developer
Cenega Czech	Prague	1988	Publisher
Centauri Production	Prague	2000	Developer
CGE Digital	Prague	2014	Mobile game developer
Charged Monkey	Prague	2014	Mobile game developer
Charles Games	Prague	2017	Developer, publisher
Chaos Concept		2002	Developer
Cinemax	Prague	1997	Developer, publisher
Computer Games Distribution	Prague	2002	Publisher
ConQuest Entertainment	Prague	1990	Publisher
Craneballs Studio	Ostrava	2008	Developer, publisher
Digital Life Productions	Hradec Králové	2009	Developer
Dreadlocks Ltd	Prague	2011	Developer
Electronic Arts Czech Republic	Prague	2001	Publisher
Fineway Studios	Brno	2004	Developer
FiolaSoft Studio	Prague	2002	Video game developer, audiovisual production, graphics, web, marketing
Flow Studio	Prague	2011	Developer
Gamajun Games	Brno	2012	Mobile game developer
gamifi.cc	Brno	2007	Developer
Geewa	Prague	2005	Mobile game developer
GoldKnights	Prague	2015	Developer
Grip Games	Prague	2010	Developer, publisher
Hammer Games	Pardubice	2016	Developer, publisher
Hangonit	Brno	2012	Developer
Hexage	Prague	2009	Developer
Honestly Games Limited	Prague	2019	Developer
Hyperbolic Magnetism	Prague	2010	Developer
Icarus Games	Brno	2011	Developer
inDev Brain	Brno	2013	Developer
INGAME STUDIOS	Brno	2020	Developer
JRC Interactive	Prague	1988	Video game distributor. Former publisher (1988–1999), dev & localizer.
Keen Software House	Prague	2010	Developer
Kubat Software	Czech	2011	Video game, app & web developer
KUBI Games	Brno	2013	Developer, publisher
Latest Past	Ostrava	2021	Developer
Lukáš Navrátil Games	Znojmo	2013	Developer
Madfinger Games	Brno	2010	Developer and publisher (Mostly mobile & online)
McMagic Productions	Prague	2012	Developer, publisher
Microsoft Česká Republika	Prague	2006 (video game division)	Publisher
Mingle Games	Prague	2012	Developer
Nepos Games	Prague	2019	Developer
Neronian Studios	Prague	2023	Developer, co-dev (AR/VR, apps, sims), publisher
North Beach Games Prague	Prague	2024	Developer, co-dev
Oxymoron Games	Prague	2017	Developer, publisher
Paper Bunker s.r.o.	Ostrava	2014	Developer and publisher (Mobile, core & VR)
Paperash	Brno	2014	Developer
Perun Creative	Ostrava	2017	Developer, publisher
Playito	Prague	2012	Mobile game developer
Playman	Hradec Králové	2001	Publisher
Purple Nebula	Czech	2017	Developer
Purpledoor Studios s.r.o.	Prague	2021	Developer, publisher
Rake in Grass	Prague	2000	Developer, publisher
Rocking Toy	Prague	2022	Developer, publisher
Running Pillow	Brno	2009	Developer
SCS Software	Prague	1997	Developer
Silver Eye Studios	Prague	2023	Developer, publisher
SleepTeam	Prague	1996	Publisher, developer
Sony Czech	Prague	1993	Publisher
Soulbound Games	Zlín	2013	Developer
Spytihněv	Prague	2011	Developer, publisher
T19 Games	Czech	2021	Developer
Team 21	Prague	2012	Developer
Touch Orchestra	Brno	2015	Developer
Trickster Arts	Brno	2012	Developer, publisher
Valdabro Games	Liberec	2015	Developer
Vicious Mime	Olomouc	2013	Developer
Volcanoid s.r.o.	Prague	2017	Developer, publisher
Warhorse Studios	Prague	2011	Developer
Wube Software	Prague	2014	Developer
Zakroutil	Prague	2017	Developer, publisher
Zima Software	Prague	1995	Developer

== Defunct video game companies ==
Company	Founded	Dissolved	Notes
7FX s.r.o.	1999	2010	Developer.
ALTAR Games	1997	2010	Developer & former publisher.
BatFields s.r.o.	2012	2024 (Inactive)	Co-dev, dev & publisher. Ex-inDev Brain (2012-2014), BadFly Interactive, a.s. (2014-2020).
Black Element Software	2000	2010	Developer. Acquired by Bohemia Interactive.
Bone Artz	2004	2007	Dev & publisher.
Disney Mobile Prague Studio	2005	2014	Developer. Former co-dev & porting.
eeGon Games	2012	2013	Mobile game developer. Inactive. Website down in 2014.
Fun 2 Robots	2013	2016	Czech office of Slovak dev.
Future Games	1996	2011	Developer. Former publisher & distributor.
Hammerware, s.r.o.	2005	2017 (Inactive afterwards)	Developer & publisher.
Mindware Studios	2002	2011	Developer.
Napoleon Games	1994	2016	Developer. Inactive. Website down after 2021.
NoSense	1994	1997	Developer.
Phoenix Arts	1994	1998	Developer. Former publisher.
Plastic Reality Technologies	2000	2006	Developer. Closed. Staff moved to Illusion Softworks.
Pterodon (Ex-Pterodon Software in 1993–1995)	1993	2006	Developer.
Silicon Jelly s.r.o.	2011	2017	Developer & publisher (mobile-focused).
Slightly Mad Studios (Prague)	2008	2017	Developer.
Unknown Identity	1996	2005	Dev, co-dev. Staff moved into Future Games, & Unknown Identity's name use ceased.
Vatra Games	2009	2012	Developer.
Vochozka Trading	1993	2008	Publisher & distributor.

== Appearance of the Czech Republic in video games ==
The country has been featured in numerous games created by Czech developers, such as Euro Truck Simulator, Euro Truck Simulator 2 and Kingdom Come: Deliverance. It has also served as the inspiration for the fictional countries of Operation Flashpoint: Resistance and Arma 2.

Command & Conquer takes place in Central Europe and some missions occur within the country's borders.

Call of Duty: Modern Warfare 3 features a fictional uprising within Prague. The city also appears within a mission in Sly 2: Band of Thieves, and a race track in Forza Motorsport 5.

In Metal Gear 2: Solid Snake, the title character is sent to save the kidnapped Czech scientist Dr. Kio Marv. Metal Gear Solid 4: Guns of the Patriots features a Prague-inspired city with Czech signs and a Vltava-inspired river named Volta.

The character of Smoke (real name Tomas Vrbada) in Mortal Kombat is a Czech hailing from Prague.

In Deus Ex: Mankind Divided, a large segment of the story takes place in a cyberpunk version of Prague.

=== As part of Czechoslovakia ===
Some missions in Contract J.A.C.K. are set in Czechoslovakia. The former state also appears in the game Hidden & Dangerous.

World of Tanks released the Plzeň map in December 2015. The update also featured Czechoslovak tanks.

== Video game events in the Czech Republic ==
Game Developers Session is a game development conference that has been held annually since 2003. It features presentations given by video game culture figures such as developers, and enables players to meet them and discuss their projects. They can also sometimes try video games that are in development.

Game Access is a game development conference that has been first held in Brno in 2010. Since 2016, Game Access is held annually. It includes speeches of developers from all around the world, the Indie Expo where all the participants compete for Game Access Awards, the Business Expo and networking events. Since 2017, the organizers have included workshops.

GameFFest is a game festival held in Prague. Players can try video games for various platforms and visit the Video Game History Museum. The festival is a part of PragoFFest.

The GAMEDAY Festival has been held every May in Třeboň since 2010, as part of Anifilm Třeboň.

The Czech Game of the Year Awards are annual awards that recognize accomplishments in video game development. The Awards were part of Gameday Festival until they became independent in 2017.

The Booom Contest was held annually from 2011 to 2013. Prizes were awarded in various categories, including Game of the Year, Best Czech Video Game and Computer Game of the Year. It was replaced by the Player's Awards for next years.

The Central and Eastern European Game Studies conference is held in Brno as an event designed to allow the discussion of video gaming by academics, journalists, developers and members of the public. It is organized by the Game Studies civic association.

Game Jam Prague is annually held in January as part of almost 200 Game Jams over the World.

Game Brew Plzeň is a meeting of video game developers, graphic designers and business enthusiasts. It has been held in Plzeň since 2015.

Gamer Pie is a video game festival held in Brno.

== Media ==
=== Print media ===
Magazine	Publisher	Since
Level	Naked Dog	1995
Score	Omega Publishing Group	1994

=== Defunct print media ===
Magazine	Since	Ended
Excalibur	1991	2001
Game4U	2000	2006
GameStar	1999	2006
KLAN	1996	2000

== Czech TV programs about video games ==
=== Programs ===
Title	Channel	Since
INDIAN	TV Relax	2008
Re-play	Prima Cool	2009
Game Page	YouTube	2013

=== Programs no longer broadcast ===
Title	Channel	Since	Ended
Game Page	Česká televize	1999	2012
Games TV	Stream.cz	2014	2016
Hrajeme s Alim	Prima Cool	2015	2016

== Notable people in the Czech gaming industry ==
- Petr Vochozka – founder and a former CEO of Illusion Softworks (now 2K Czech), the company responsible for games like Hidden & Dangerous or Mafia: The City of Lost Heaven.
- Marek Španěl and Ondřej Španěl – founders of Bohemia Interactive, the biggest video game development company in the Czech Republic. The company developed Operation Flashpoint: Cold War Crisis, the Arma series and DayZ.
- Daniel Vávra – director of Mafia: The City of Lost Heaven, as well as founder and creative director of Warhorse Studios, the developers of Kingdom Come: Deliverance.
- Jakub Dvorský – CEO of the independent video game company Amanita Design, developers of Samorost and Machinarium.
- Miloš Endrle – founder and former CTO of Geewa, a company awarded the Red Herring 100 Europe award.
- Lukáš Macura – founder and CEO of Cinemax. He is also responsible for the Database of Czech and Slovak Video games.
- František Fuka – programmer and musician who made video games for the ZX Spectrum during the 1980s and 1990s. Currently working as a film translator, preparing English language movies for Czech release.
- Lukáš Ladra – founder and first editor-in-chief of Excalibur, the original Czech video gaming magazine.
- Marek Rosa – founder and CEO of both Keen Software House, the developers of Space Engineers, and GoodAI, currently developing AI People.

== See also ==
- List of video games developed in the Czech Republic
