= Darklands =

Darklands or Dark Lands can refer to:

== Film ==
- Darkland (2017 film), a 2017 Danish film
- Darklands (2022 film), a 2022 Australian film directed by Scott Major
- Darklands (film), a 1996 Welsh horror film

== Games ==
- Dark Lands, a location in the Games Workshop's fictional Warhammer Fantasy setting
- Dark Lands (video game), a video game by Mingle Games
- Darklands (video game), a computer role-playing game by Microprose

== Literature ==
- Dark Land, a continent in stories of J. R. R. Tolkien
- Darklands, a fictional realm in the gamebook series Lone Wolf
- Darklands Trilogy, a series of books by Anthony Eaton

== Music ==
- Darklands (album), a 1987 album by The Jesus and Mary Chain
- "Darklands" (song), a song and 1987 single by The Jesus and Mary Chain

== Television ==
- Darklands (TV series), 2019 Irish crime drama series
