= Belegost =

1989 video game

- Title screen
- Developer: Golden Triangle
- Platforms: Atari ST, ZX Spectrum
- Release: 1989
- Genre: Interactive fiction

Belegost is a 1989 Czech text adventure for the ZX spectrum and Atari ST. It is considered part of the textovka genre—the Czechoslovak text adventure industry.

== Plot ==
The game is a manifestation of the motifs of JRR Tolkien's novels; the title comes from one of the underground dwarf towns in The Lord of the Rings, which is also where the game is set. Within the narrative, the town has been plundered by the Orcs, while the Alqualamir stone remained in the city. The task of the player is to find the stone and escape the city.

== Development ==
The game was developed by Golden Triangle, a development trio made up of Frantisek Fuka (Fuxoft), Miroslav Fídler (Cybexlab) and Tomáš Rylek (TRC), who would later go on to make Jet-Story and Tetris 2. The music was composed by František Fuka.

The three met at Prague's Arabská Gymnázium, and before they had access to computers they programmed on squared paper and learned the basics on a scientific calculator; their first computers were ZX Spectrums, which is what essentially all of their games were made for. When they did begin to create games they started on their own, but they eventually started assisting with each other's creations. When Rylek finished the last levels in Fuka's Tetris 2, according to Fuka "That's when we all put the 'Golden Triangle' logo in all our games (no matter who made us the game), with the name of the product always above the top corner of the triangle". All three members of the Golden Triangle participated in this title, although the main driving force behind Belegost was Miroslav Fídler.

In order to make the game more user-friendly than older titles such as Vampire or Exoter, Fidler designed an icon command menu, a context-sensitive help text, and a listing of on-screen motion options. The script and program were written by Marek Fídler, while the music was composed by František Fuka. The player was able to turn the music on and off again during the game. The help clues could be accessed via the menu, and contained simple nursery rhymes in a fantasy theme. To orient the players in the game map environment, the game include contextual directions such as 'to the mountain' or 'along the stream', rather than using the cardinal directions. Unusual for text adventures at the time, the game has a sense of delayed action for certain game events, for instance when the player burns moss, the game indicates that the moss is burning and regardless of if the player completes an action, will later note than the moss flame has extinguished - if the player was not ready to complete their required action they would be unable to successfully complete the game.

Belegost is one of the many text adventures of the time inspired by the works of Tolkien, including the 1979 Norwegian adventure Ringen, a series that began with The Hobbit, and parodies such as The Boggit and Bored of the Rings. Specifically, the game draws inspiration from Tolkien's book The Silmarillion which was not yet available in Czechoslovakia at the time of the game's release. Historie a kontext produkce počítačových her žánru adventure v České republice notes that Tolkien's works were a popular subject for video games in the 1980s, and that Belegost fits into that trend alongside Melbourne House's The Hobbit (1982), and Addison Wesley Publishing Company's trio of games The Fellowship of the Ring (1986), The Shadows of Mordor (1987), and The Crack Of Doom (1989).

== Ports ==
The game experienced success on the ZX Spectrum and compatible computers, which led to conversions to other platforms including Atari ST, MS-DOS, Psion pocket computers, NeXTStep, and Mac OS X. It was later ported to the Apple iPhone, both in the original Czech language as well as in English translation.

English versions were later made for the NeXTSTEP and Psion, while in 2010 a remixed version was created by Lacrima for iOS devices in both Czech and English, featuring the original music. The game is in the public domain.

The game has been added to the SNDH archive.

== Reception ==
Freegames.cz commented that the "hilarious" Czech game had a simple yet visually pleasing atmosphere. In 2002, FreeHry.cz said that while the game was over a decade old it was still of quite good-quality. Historie a kontext produkce počítačových her žánru adventure v České republice praised the title's original features, and its "well-elaborated story". The paper Indiana Jones Fights the Communist Police notes that Belegost was an example of the Czechoslovak text adventure industry drawing inspiration from fantasy. Database-her.cz noted that by filtering out the Czech games in their database and sorting them by year of release, the oldest Czech game is Belegost, though added that this is only true of DOS games. Root.cz notes that Belegost is one Czech game along with Indiana Jones 2 that didn't "blindly" copy the control system for Colossal Cave Adventure, in that the two titles, both the brainchilds of Fuka, use icons and drop-down menus. Its reputation led to it being "one of the first games we reviewed within the Free Games server". Gaming the Iron Curtain argued that the title's icon based interface led to it being essentially a point n click adventure without graphics. CZpug deemed the game "the best Czech game on Spectrum", and "a masterpiece of the Golden Triangle".
