= Bloodie =

1998 video game

- Platform(s): MS-DOS
- Release: 1998
- Genre(s): Puzzle

Bloodie is a 1998 Czech puzzle video game for MS-DOS.

== Development ==
The game began life as a demo program and variation of Boovie, and it uses the same graphics engine as the other game. The game is similar to the Moorhuhn series.

== Reception ==
Bonusweb.cz felt the game was great and entertaining as few games are. Doupe.cz felt the graphics and music were decent and held up in the 2010s.
