= Turbo Speedway =

1995 video game

- Developer: World Spy Software
- Publisher: Space Interactive
- Platform: CZK 300
- Release: 1995
- Genre: Racing

Turbo Speedway is a Czech racing video game developed by World Spy Software and published by Space Interactive in 1995 for the CZK 300. (Note: A 1994 German racing game has the same name and inspiration.) Turbo Speedway is an unofficial remake of the 1983 top-down game Rally Speedway and was sold for the CZK 300. It was the first Czech racing game, and one of two games published by Space Interactive in 1996, along with Oil Empire by 88 Panzer Division. The game made a marginal profit.

The Hrej! newspaper wrote that Turbo Speedway was "one of the most daring [games] that has ever hit stores from Czech production". Score's Petr Slunéčko wrote the game was "characterized by its ugliness and lifelessness" and offered a scathing rating of 1/10.

iDNES commented that the game's only value from a modern perspective is that it illustrates the "spartan conditions in which the development of games took place in our country at that time".
