= Ve stínu havrana =

1999 video game

- Developers: Rainbow Rhino; Cinemax
- Publisher: Cinemax
- Platforms: MS-DOS; Windows
- Release: 1999
- Genre: Adventure
- Mode: Single-player

Ve stínu havrana (English: In the Raven Shadow) is a 1999 adventure game developed by the Slovak company Rainbow Rhino and published by the Czech company CINEMAX.

== Production ==
The game was created by Rainbow Rhino.

All characters in the game are voiced by the Czech actor Jiří Lábus.

The first edition of the game became sold out in less than a year. The title saw three editions, and became a magazine attachment eight times; it was played by 250,000 players.

In 2008, work was being done on a second game, however it was never released. The game is currently available on Steam, and was uploaded on July 12, 2017.

== Plot and gameplay ==
The player takes control of the good-natured monk Severin, who one day "escapes" from the monastery and decides to seek his way of life.

== Critical reception ==
Just Adventure decided that players willing to overlook the game's technical limitations would find enjoyment from its witty sense of humour. Bonusweb.cz felt that if the idea of the game bored players, they could wait another week for Czech adventure game Hot Summer 2 to be released. Bonusweb asserted that the game is likely known by every Czech computer player.

== Sequel ==
Cinemax announced works on Ve stínu havrana 2 in 2007. It was scheduled for a release in the second quarter of 2008. It was a collaboration between House of Dragonflies and Cinemax, and contained the work of graphic designers Erik Sille and Boris Sirka. The game's plot would have seen the monk Severin be trapped between medieval Europe, and futuristic world guided by Plato's philosophy of perfect States. The game was inspired by the works of PKDick, W. Gibson, and T. Giliam's film productions. It was a 3D point-and-click adventure with a non-linear story, while featuring limited RPG elements. The game was reported as being make completely in Czech, including its dubbing. It promised to touch on historical themes and insights into philosophy, religion, mathematics, and cybernetics. Development was eventually cancelled. Bonusweb felt it was a shame the project never took off, as it seemed like an "interesting psychedelic affair".
