= Domácí násilí: Game over =

2003 video game

Domácí násilí: Game over is a 2003 domestic abuse-themed Czech adventure video game developed by Centauri Productions and published by MPSV.

== Development ==
The game was commissioned by the Czech government's Ministry of Labour and Social Affairs, in order to promote among young people aged 15–25 its information campaign against domestic violence. A total of CZK 3.4 million was set aside from the government budget for the campaign; of this, 1.4 million was for the creation of materials and 2 million for dissemination. In addition to the game, advertisements and commercials were also developed for the campaign, which appeared in cinemas, promotional leaflets, billboards and brochures. Centauri Productions, who had worked on the sequel to the popular adventure series Gooka, was chosen to develop the title. The developers used the same engine - CPAL3D - they had used to create Gooka 2.

=== Educational goals ===
The purpose of the game is to teach players mutual tolerance, understanding and problem-solving in a non-combative way. According to Doupe.cz, this was the first time that Czech politicians had attempted to change public opinion and behaviour in the form of a computer game. According to Tiscali.cz, the game's title, "Game over", is a metaphor that represents the loss of happiness and even life that domestic abuse can cause.

== Gameplay ==
This free-to-play game was inspired by The Sims. Players decide on the physical appearance of their two main characters, who are then are given fifty thousand crowns to design their home. Within the game, the player controls the lives of the married couple while maintaining the strength of their relationship. Delaying or neglecting to fulfil the man's wants and needs will lead to domestic abuse, the couple splitting, and the end of the game.

== Critical reception ==
A review on Hrej.cz commented that it would be impossible to find a better freeware clone of The Sims. Bonusweb.cz said that the 3D game engine was cumbersome and at times slowed down the game. FreeHry.cz described the game as "above-average".
