= Hovniválové aneb Záhada komixu =

1998 adventure game

Hovniválové aneb Záhada komixu (English: Dung-beetles aka The Mystery of A Comic) is a 1998 adventure game developed by Centauri Production and published by JRC Interactive.

== Plot and gameplay ==
The game is a 2D adventure about a boy named Jerry who becomes trapped in a world of comic books. To return to the real world he must play through four different comic book narratives and help their protagonists overcome their obstacles.

The game opens with a six-minute video played by live actors. It is divided into four different chapters, and interwoven with movie sequences and minigames in other genres like slot machines. The game has two difficulty settings – easy and hard – which was an uncommon feature of Czech games. The harder version required certain items to be picked up at particular times of the story, and required more actions to complete puzzles.

== Production ==
The game was one of the first titles from Centauri Productions to be released. An extensive demo of the game was featured in the set 'PC GAME COLLECTION SPECIAL LEVEL No. 2/98'. BonusWeb acknowledged this title did not do well upon its release. Jan Hloušek served as chief programmer and team leader on the game.

The creators of Horké léto 2 chose to use Centauri Productions as the game's programmer due to their previous work on games such as Hovniválové.

== Critical reception ==
Level said the camera work, editing, and music were all professionally done, Zive felt the cutscenes were captivating and Plne Hry deemed the game "unforgettable". Mirsoft called it a sprawling and impressive adventure. Madukas found it overly confusing and illogical, while Score's reviewer compared the game's graphics to those of the Slovak game Next Space and described them as amateur.
