= Memento Mori (video game) =

2008 video game

- Developer: Centauri Production
- Publishers: Cinemax (Czech Republic); Dtp entertainment (Germany); Lace Mamba Global (UK); Got Game Entertainment (US); Akella (Russia); Bohemia Interactive (re-release)
- Engine: CPAL3D
- Platform: Microsoft Windows
- Release: EU: 2008; NA: July 29, 2009
- Genre: Point-and-click adventure game
- Mode: Single-player

Memento Mori is an adventure video game developed by Czech company Centauri Production in 2008.

== Gameplay ==
Memento Mori is a classic point-and-click adventure game. The game switches between two characters. In some parts you play as Max Durrand but in others you play as Larisa Svetlova. The player can make some decisions during the game. The game has six endings, which occur based on the player's decisions.

== Plot ==
There is an alarm failure in the Hermitage Museum and Colonel Ostankovich suspects that something has happened. He decides to find Maxim Durrand, a history professor and former criminal, to find out what happened. Max is forced to help Ostankovich if he doesn't want to have troubles due to his past. In the search for the stolen paintings Max and Lara (mostly on their own) visit the Hermitage, an old library, the Interpol's headquarters in Lyon, the residence in Scotland and further locations. They interrogate the suspects, search for data, break codes and discover forgeries. All their journeys finally lead Max, accompanied by his brother, to the Finnish cloister. Strange deaths, secret signs and increasingly weird behavior of Max's brother André and of those around him force Max to the very edge of sanity.

The story is set in various places in Europe. The player can get to Saint Petersburg, Lyon, Finnish Church, Lisbon and Scotland.

=== Characters ===
- Maxim Durrand: Max is the main protagonist of the game. He is young French professor of history. In his past he was forced to forge various paintings of great painters in order to raise money for his wife's surgery. However, she died and he was dragged deeper into criminal world. He was arrested by Larisa but she made a covert agreement with him instead to get him into jail. Then he became an informant to Russian police.
- Larisa Svetlova: Lara is the second playable character in Memento Mori. She was an officer in the Russian police force. She was due to her achievements transferred to Lyon where she works as a Russian representative at Interpol's headquarters.
- André Durrand: Andy is a younger brother to Max. He accompanies his brother during the investigation.
- Colonel Ostankovich: Ostankovich is the commander of a special police department in Saint Petersburg. He promised that under his command not an item will get lost in the Hermitage. He forces Max and Lara to help him.

== Reception ==
The game received mixed to positive reviews from critics.

== Sequel ==
The sequel was released in 2012 in Germany. Due to problems at its publisher, Dtp entertainment, the game had to wait for its worldwide release until May 13, 2014.
