= Knight's Path =

- Developers: Jan Tichota and Amn Chahrour
- Platform: Microsoft Windows
- Genre: Action role-playing game
- Mode: Single-player

Knight's Path is an upcoming single-player action role-playing game developed by Jan Tichota and Aamn Chahrour. Set in a low-fantasy medieval world inspired by the 15th-century Holy Roman Empire, the game follows Alryk, a young disgraced noble who must rebuild his life and decide what kind of knight he will become. The game features an open world, branching narrative, faction-based choices, and combat inspired by Historical European Martial Arts.

== Plot ==
Knight's Path is set in a grounded low-fantasy medieval world influenced by the culture of the Holy Roman Empire as well as Slavic and Germanic folklore. The player character, Alryk, is a young noble who has lost his status and possessions and is forced to begin again with little more than his own abilities.

Alryk attempts to regain his place in society while becoming involved in the problems affecting the people of the region. His initial goal of recovering his former status develops into a broader conflict involving local communities, rival factions, political conspiracies and forgotten lore.

== Gameplay ==
Knight's Path is a third-person, open-world action RPG designed for single-player play. Its gameplay combines exploration, combat, character progression and narrative choices. The developers describe the world as handcrafted and without level scaling, meaning that areas and enemies are not intended to automatically adjust to the player's level.

=== Combat ===
Combat is inspired by Historical European Martial Arts (HEMA) and medieval fighting manuals. The system emphasizes timing, positioning, parrying, counterattacks and weapon control rather than fast-paced arcade mechanics. The game incorporates stances and techniques intended to reflect historical swordsmanship while making adjustments for accessibility and entertainment.

Weapons include one-handed weapons such as swords, axes and maces, as well as shields; two-handed weapons including longswords, spears, polearms and greatswords; and ranged weapons such as bows and crossbows. Combat proficiency is intended to develop through practice, with the character's animations and available techniques changing as the player gains experience.

=== Progression and equipment ===
Character progression is designed to be visible through gameplay rather than relying exclusively on conventional numerical statistics. Alryk begins with limited combat ability and gradually improves through training, practice and encounters with experienced characters.

Armor is divided into head, torso, hands and legs, allowing players to combine different pieces. Equipment is intended to progress from basic clothing and padded armor toward increasingly sophisticated medieval armor, including plate armor. Armor can also be customized in areas such as color and decorative details.

=== World and activities ===
The open world contains settlements, wilderness areas, caves, castles and other locations designed around exploration and quests. Non-player characters are planned to follow daily routines, while the city of Eranthold is described as having its own economy and political environment.

The game includes two major factions, castle sieges, a knightly tournament and quests involving the local population. Players can choose which faction to support, with these decisions affecting progression and the narrative. The game also includes monsters and other low-fantasy elements alongside human enemies such as bandits and knights.

== Development ==
Knight's Path is developed by a small independent team led by Jan Tichota. The development team consists of four core members: Tichota as game director and designer, Aamn Chahrour as lead programmer, Taygun Gencosmanoğlu as 3D artist and modeller, and Paul Metcalfe as lead animator. Volunteers have also contributed to the project. The developers have stated that they have declined publishing offers in order to retain creative independence.

In December 2023 the team released Knight’s Path: The Tournament a short medieval RPG promising 2–3 hours of gameplay which serves as a technical demo for Knight's Path. It follows Alryk as he participates in a Tournament to test his might and earn rewards..

Knight's Path was introducd to public in January 2026 when developers released first gameplay demo. Developers also announced they plan to release a new demo and a Kickstarter campaign. Demo was scheduled for the end of 2026.

== Reception ==
=== Pre-release ===
The game has attracted substantial attention during its development. In February 2026, the developers announced that the Steam page had surpassed 300,000 wishlists. In August 2026, the team announced that the game had reached 400,000 wishlists, describing the response as support for the project's independent development.
