= Colony 28 =

1997 video game

- Developer: Napoleon Games
- Publisher: JRC Interactive
- Designer: Martin Matějka
- Composers: Martin Matějka; Petr Klabík
- Platform: MS-DOS
- Release: June 1997
- Genre: Platform
- Mode: Single-player

Colony 28 is a science fiction-themed platform game developed for MS-DOS by Napoleon Games and published by JRC Interactive in 1997.

== Plot ==
Earth was attacked by aliens in 2013 and conquered in few weeks. Humanity was enslaved, and Earth was given the name Colony 28. Humans are turned into obedient androids who work for the aliens. Five years later, the protagonist of the game, which is turned into a cyborg, preserves his memories due to a malfunction. He then turns against the aliens and helps the human resistance.

== Gameplay ==
The game is a side-scrolling platform game. The player controls a combat robot and shoots enemies that try to destroy him. There are multiple tasks that player has to fulfill in every level. Once they complete the tasks, they move to the next level.

== Development ==
The game was developed by team called 5th Dimension led by Martin Matějka. Matějka met Jindřich Rohlík during development, and 5th Dimension joined Rohlík's Napoleon Games. Napoleon Games finished the game in 1997. Colony 28 is inspired by games such as Another World and Flashback.

== Reception ==
The game has received mostly positive reviews. Petr Bulíř of Level gave the game a score of 60%. He stated that the game is similar to Flashback. He noted game's high difficulty. Bulíř praised game's atmosphere and music, but was critical of its animations and graphics. He also praised the story, particularly its ending.
