= Naturix =

1994 video game

- Developer: Raster Software
- Programmer: Radek Štěrba
- Composer: Radek Štěrba
- Platform: Atari 8-bit
- Release: 1994
- Genre: Action-adventure
- Mode: Single-player

Naturix is a 1994 action-adventure game developed by Radek Štěrba for Atari 8-bit computers.

== Plot ==
The Game is set in a Solar System where a Planet called Naturland can be found. It is inhabited by a Race called Naturix. They are dependent on Power Supplies from a Base on the farthest Moon of Naturland. The Protagonist is sent there for some Energy but the Base is occupied by Hostile beings. He has to find four Energy boxes and a Navigation Tool in order to get home.

He returns to his Spacecraft after he obtains everything and leaves the Base. He is last seen flying in the Spacecraft towards Home.

== Gameplay ==
Player controls a Character of Naturix. His task is to find 4 Boxes and a Navigation Tool. When he obtains all needed items then he has to get to his Spacecraft and leave the Base. He has to search a large base full of Enemies to fulfil this task. He can fire laser shots to kill Enemies but there is a limited amount of Ammo. There are also places where the player has to solve some puzzles.

== Development ==
The game was developed by Radek Štěrba (Raster Software). He got his first Atari 8-bit computer in 1988. He started to experiment with programming and also created some simple games. He worked with his high school friend Robert Knill. Štěrba admitted that their first projects weren't really good but they got better. Štěrba helped Knill with some games but also created some of his own. His first big game was Predator (1991) that he created with help of Knill.

Štěrba developed Naturix during his studies at Palacký University, Olomouc in 1994. He discussed the development with Robert Knill. Knill talked him to redesign the main character. Knill's critical expression to the original design almost led to a split between them but Štěrba admitted that Knill was right and was glad that he followed Knill's advice. Naturix was released as a commercial game in 1994. Štěrba considered Naturix to be his finest Work. Štěrba was also thinking about a sequel. Štěrba released the game for free in 1999 along his other games.

Flop Magazine published a demo version of the game in its 29th Volume. It included much smaller World and the player could find only Energy Pills and laser shots.
