= Ve stínu magie =

1996 video game

- Developer: Division
- Publisher: JRC Interactive
- Platform: Amiga
- Release: 1996
- Genre: Dungeon
- Mode: Single-player

Ve stínu magie is a 1996 dungeon-crawler, grid-based, fantasy RPG video game developed by Czech company Division and published by JRC Interactive for the Amiga.

The Division team created a number of demos in the early 90s. Their next project, Ve stínu magie, was in development for around half a year until its completion in 1996. The game was originally to be distributed by the company Signum, but the agreement fell through, and the Czech market distribution was taken over by JRC. The game sold poorly and was not very well received; there were also few Czech gamers who owned an Amiga at that time.

A sequel was released the following year.
