= Heroes of Science and Fiction =

- Publisher: Oxymoron Games
- Platforms: Windows, macOS, Linux
- Release: 17 March 2026 (full version); 3 September 2024 (early access)
- Genre: Turn-based strategy
- Modes: Single-player, Multiplayer

Heroes of Science and Fiction (originally known as Silence of the Siren) is a turn-based strategy video game developed and published by Czech studio Oxymoron Games for Windows, macOS, and Linux.

== Gameplay ==
Heroes of Science and Fiction is inspired by Heroes of Might and Magic. It is a turn-based strategy game with RPG elements. Player controls heroes that command armies of soldiers, machines or various creatures. These heroes travel across the game world fighting enemies, and collecting loot. This includes resources, which can be used to develop towns, as well as pieces of equipment which offer buffs to a hero. Heroes can contest resource posts such as mines, which offer a resource income each turn, and attack other bases. Combat occurs on a hexagonal grid where units move and attack.

There are currently four factions with different units and commanders - Fossorians, United Nations of Solar System (UNSS), Sovereign Fleet and Children of the Source. Fifth faction - Hive Mind is planned. Fossorians are space moles faction relying mainly on the overwhelming numbers and brute strength of the ground forces. UNSS represents humans and an alien race Hesperidians who rule over Earth population. Sovereign Fleet are space pirates formed from Sovereign Colonies, an opposition to UNSS.

== Development ==
The game was announced on 22 September 2022 as Silence of the Siren. On 30 September 2024, it was released in early access. This version included three playable factions (Fossorians, Children of the Source, Sovereign Fleet), Fossorian campaign and 9 playable skirmish maps.

An update called the Winter Planetary Update was released on 9 February 2025 that included various improvements to game mechanics. It also added new maps to skirmish odwhile modified versions of existing maps newly started to support 6- and 8-player configurations under custom scenarios.

An update was released on 7 March 2025. It added UNSS Campaign along with new units and characters and various gameplay improvements.

The game changed its title to Heroes of Science and Fiction on 16 July 2025. It was accompanied by a major update adding Map Editor, Random Map Generator, new maps, units and other features.

On 18 February 2026, the full release was announced for 17 March 2026.
