= Unlimited Warriors =

1996 video game

- Developer(s): Digitalica
- Publisher(s): Space Interactive
- Release: 1996

Unlimited Warriors is a Czech 1996 martial arts-themed fighting/action game developed by Digitalica and published by Space Interactive for PC DOS.
