= Fallout 1.5: Resurrection =

- Developer: Resurrection Team
- Designers: Václav Panoš; Marek Štípek; Milan Ratičák; Marián Lóži
- Platform: Microsoft Windows
- Release: CZ: 3 October 2013; WW: 15 July 2016
- Genre: Role-playing
- Mode: Single-player

Fallout 1.5: Resurrection is a total conversion mod for Fallout 2. Developed by a team of four fans from the Czech Republic, the game was initially released there on 3 October 2013, followed by a worldwide English release on 15 July 2016. Working on the mod during their free time, development took approximately 10 years. The mod offers an original story and new locations set within the Fallout universe. It is estimated that finishing the game takes 25 hours.

The title Resurrection symbolizes not only a revival of an older style of Fallout but also the protagonist of the mod, who is resurrected.

== Gameplay ==
The mod features the same gameplay as the original games. The player is free to move at will until they enter into combat. Combat gives them a number of action points to move, fire, check their equipment, reload and the like. When a player uses up all of their action points, they end their turn and enemies start theirs. If the player survives unharmed, they have their action points restored. Injuries and poisons can reduce the number of action points available both in a single term and semi-permanently until combat ends and the player can be treated. Combat and completion of jobs or quests reward the player with experience points with which they can level up their characters and apply beneficial perks to become more suited to the dangerous post-apocalyptic world. General gameplay consists of traveling and interacting with local inhabitants and organizations to complete goals and aid or inhibit the NPCs. The player's actions dictate what future story or gameplay opportunities are available. Mature themes such as alcohol consumption, drug usage and sex are present.

Organized crime, prostitution and slavery are major elements of the setting. Character creation is based on the SPECIAL role-playing system.

== Plot ==
The story is set in 2170 in what was once New Mexico. The injured protagonist wakes up in a cave with amnesia. They start to search for hints of their past but the only clue they have is a mysterious talisman.

On their way they come across a group of ghouls who act as though they know the player and then proceed to try and to kill them. The player then finds a dying ghoul named Thomas, who claims they were the player's best friend. Thomas reveals to the player that they are members of the Cult of the Rebirth, led by a person known as the Saviour. The cult has a machine that turns ghouls into normal humans. The problem is that turning a Ghoul human again requires at least one normal person and the turned person later dies of tissue decomposition. The protagonist is, along with the Saviour, one of turned Ghouls so it means that they will die as well. In the Rebirth base the player can choose whether they join the cult once again or destroy the cult.

If the player joins the cult once again, they can help the cult destroy the city of Albuquerque, but they will die in the battle. The Rebirth then dominates the whole area which foreshadows a conflict with the New California Republic.

If the player destroys the base of the Rebirth which then terminates hope of the Ghouls to become normal again, the cult is destroyed and the protagonist goes to wasteland where they commit suicide to avoid a slow death by tissue decomposition.

== Development ==
The development started in 2003 when the official editor and a script documentation for Fallout was released. It took 10 years because developers underestimated the project size. Because of this, the main story and many concepts were changed during the development. The mod was finished and released in 2013. The English translated version of the mod was released on July 15, 2016.

== Reception ==
The mod has received mostly positive reviews since its release, with an average score of 77% at Czech videogame database Databaze-her. The mod was elected 6th best game of the year by readers of Bonusweb. Readers of Eurogamer Czech elected it to be third-best role-playing game of the year.
