= Prokletí Eridenu =

1997 video game

- Developer(s): Napalm Soft; Zima Software
- Publisher(s): Zima Software
- Platform(s): MS-DOS
- Release: 1997
- Genre(s): Dungeon crawl

Prokletí Eridenu (English: Curse of Eriden) is a Czech dungeon crawl video game developed by Napalm Soft and published by Zima Software for MS-DOS in 1997.

== Plot ==
The game takes place in the ruins of the mysterious, cursed city of Eriden, in the dungeons below the hero must destroy four magic mirrors. The player controls one character out of a choice of nine - each has three basic attributes - strength, mana, and health. There are hunger and thirst game mechanics for the main character.

== Reception ==
The game received negative reviews, garnering a 40% from Level and a 30% from Score. Root.cz felt the title fell into the category of somewhat less successful (but interesting) games. High Voltage wrote that the game had a reputation for a terrible dueling system, ragged level design, and sterile graphics. In contrast, Bonuzweb.cz highly praised the game's automapping feature and the well illustrated fights with enemies.

== Legacy ==
In 1999, the full version of the Eriden Curse was made available for free.
