= Excalibur (magazine) =

Czechoslovak computer game magazine

Excalibur is the first Czech video gaming magazine. It was published by Martin Ludvík and led by Lukáš Ladra.

== External sources ==
- Founder's blog about the magazine
