= Horké léto =

- Genre: Adventure
- Developer: Maxon
- Publisher: JRC Interactive
- Platform: PC

Horké léto (Hot Summer) is a point-and-click video game. Developed by Czech studio Maxon, it was published in 1998 by JRC Interactive. A sequel, entitled Horké léto 2, was developed by Centauri Production and published in 1999 by JRC Interactive. A third game Žhavé léto 3 ½ is an action/adventure/driving game developed by Centauri Production and CINEMAX, published by Akella in 2006, which although unable to use the characters and titles of the first two games was related and rounded off what was effectively a trilogy. Žhavé léto 3 ½ was published in English, Spanish, French and German as Evil Days of Luckless John and in Russian as Сорвать Куш.

== Production ==
The graphics for the video game were created by Marek Píša. Píša and Viktor Bocan also participated in the screenplay writing. Sound and music were created by William Foldes. Most characters, excluding some female ones, were voiced by comedian Zdeněk Izer, a notable Czech impersonator. The game shares a humorous style that can be seen across several Czech adventures, such as Polda. Horké léto was the first Czech game with professional dubbing. The game's most famous quote comes in its opening scene: "I am an ordinary kid. Guys call me Rambo and girls [call me] asshole. Otherwise, I'm Majer. Honza Majer". Like many other domestic video games of the era, Horke Leto was intended to appeal directly to Czech and Slovak players. The game became a phenomenon upon its release and it immediately ranked among the most popular Czech adventures. In 2003, however, Petr Ticháček wrote that the fan base of the game had heavily diminished.

== Sequels ==
According to Miroslav Mrňa, the idea of a sequel was brought up by JRC, an exclusive distributor for the first game. The developers found the proposition interesting and decided to pursue it. Initial work on the sequel began in late December 1998. The team consisted of one scriptwriter, two programmers, three graphic artists and two musicians. Mrna described the development and production process of the game in detail for iDNES.cz. A watercolour-style design was used for the backgrounds of Horke Leto 2; it was painted by hand and then scanned into a computer. The images were inspired by the works of painter Jan Štěpánek. By mid-November, the game was expected to be released in time for the Christmas season. The game was planned to be released around the same time as Polda 2 and there was a friendly rivalry between the two titles. Horke Leto 2 caught the attention of Bonusweb during development, who devoted a considerable amount of airtime to the game. This included a series of news articles where they observed the game's development; gave a preview and review; provided a tutorial; published an interview with project leader Miroslav Mrňa and finally gave away a demo. IDEA Games completed a conversion of the game for iOS and Android platforms in 2012; players could access a 30-minute episode before having to pay in order to complete the rest of the adventure. The game was re-released with updated graphics.

While developers from Centauri Production wanted to create a second sequel to the game, they were unable to obtain the rights for the name "Horke Leto" or the main character Honza. The original title for the third in the series was intended to be Raiders of the Lost Casino, but this was only used for international distribution purposes. In May 2005, the third title was announced as being prepared for release in the third quarter of that year. Subsequently, the game was scheduled to be released in the first few weeks of 2006. This was later pushed to February that year. Akella demonstrated the game as a work-in-progress at E3 2006. Akella planned an English release for the end of 2006. A French version was made and released 24 August 2007. The game's visual style is both cartoon-like and gritty.

== Plot and gameplay ==
In Horké léto the player takes control of teenager Honza Majer, who must rescue his family after they are captured by cannibals. In Horké léto 2, Honza Majer must retrieve an artifact—the Purple Salamander—from the bandit, One-Eye Dingo. Žhavé léto 3 ½ sees the player take control of Honza's grandfather, the hapless protagonist Johnny Majer, who must compete with the Mafia in the age of Prohibition. Set in the gangster age of the 1930s, the player takes control of the handsome street rat Johnny who inherits a casino, only to discover that there is a plot to take it off him.

The first two games are point-and-click adventures controlled by the mouse. The third is mainly a point-and-click adventure with elements of stealth, fighting, driving, and shoot 'em up.

== Critical reception ==
=== Horké léto ===
Refresher.cz deemed Horké léto an average game, but noted that it didn't stop the game from becoming a domestic hit. Doupe.cz wrote that the game was one of the best Czech adventures, one that every gamer should play. Excalibur stated that while the graphics and gameplay were nothing special, it was the dubbing into local languages that captured the imagination of Czechoslovakia. PC Tuning deemed it one of the 10 best Czech games of all time. Refresher thought it was the 20th best Czech title, praising the game's amusing dialogues and first-class dubbing.

=== Horké léto 2 ===
In a preview, Bonusweb hoped that the game's humour would outweigh its average graphics and animations making it an above-average Czech title. Bonusweb.cz compared the title to Polda 2, and ultimately decided that despite its limitations it was worth a play.

=== Evil Days of Luckless John ===
Evil Days of Luckless John (Žhavé léto 3 ½) received mixed reviews from critics who enjoyed the game's artistic style and story but disliked its gameplay and interface. Hexus disliked the clunky interface, though the review praised the game's graphics. Adventure Classic Gaming felt the game was a disappointing attempt to recapture the classic point and click adventures of the late 20th century. Adventures Planet noted the strange mix of genres, that saw arcade-style gameplay be followed by Myst-style puzzles. Bonusweb felt that despite the game's limitations, it was genuinely surprising. Game Watcher deemed the title "pretty poor". Game Slave found John to be a great idea that was poorly executed. 4 Players felt a lot of the humour fell flat. Jeux Video described the game as a funny and endearing experience. Adventure Treff felt the game was more likely to induce annoyance than fun. PC Guru thought the game was fun despite its graphics. Bonusweb compared the game favorably to Polda 5. Tiscali felt the game's screenshots were reminiscent of Full Throttle.

== See also ==
- Video games in the Czech Republic
