= Mashinky =

- Developer: Jan Zelený
- Designer: Jan Zelený
- Programmer: Pavel Wad Navrátil
- Composer: Tim Becherand
- Platform: Windows
- Release: 6 October 2017 (early access)
- Mode: Single-player

Mashinky is a transport strategy video game developed by Jan Zelený. The goal is to create a railroad empire on procedurally generated maps, combining schematic construction mode and game rules inspired by board games. It has been available in early access since 6 October 2017.

== Gameplay ==
Mashinky is a strategy game with railway transport. The aim of the game is to create a railway empire on a generated map across seven historical eras from the age of steam to the super-modern magnetic levitation sets. The game blends realistic graphics with a square construction world, all with rules reminiscent of board games.

At the beginning of each map, the player becomes the owner of a small transportation company in the early 20th century. Their task is to import goods and passengers by planning and building tracks in complex terrain, buying and inventing new types of locomotives, wagons, station buildings and railway infrastructure. They must stand up against economic rules and increase profits by transporting passengers to cities, or goods between many interconnected industries.

The player can switch to a 2D isometric construction view at any time during gameplay. In this mode, the world is divided by a clear grid. The players can build anything from a simple connection between two stations to a complex railway network full of signal-controlled level crossings to maximize the throughput and utilization of your tracks.

As the game progresses, the player must adapt and expand their train empire as the map changes. In addition to new means of transport, they can also use improvements to production buildings, modernize their depots, or expand stations with new services and buildings. Each upgrade will give a unique bonus, increase capacity, add a new production process, or even a new type of item.

At any time, the view can be switched from a 2D isometric construction view to a fully 3D one. The 3D view allows players to see the game in greater detail by rendering things like the gears on the train, the surrounding mountains, and the interior of your passenger train.

== Development ==
The game has been developed since 2009 by Jan Zelený. It was inspired by the games Sid Meier's Railroad Tycoon, Transport Tycoon and others. Originally, the game was developed in his free time, but since June 2018, the author Jan Zelený has devoted himself to it fully. He created his own three-dimensional game engine for it.

The game was announced on November 3, 2016, at the GDS conference still under the name Logistics, where it won the GDS Indie Awards 2016. It was then awarded the 4–6 May 2017 at the Game Access 2017 conference, winning Best Gameplay and Player's Choice.

In 2018, it won the title Czech-Slovak Game of the Year 2017 in the largest Czech game survey Gamers' Awards and in the Czech Game of the Year 2017 competition it was awarded by the expert jury for the Greatest Hope and the Best Game Design. As of August 2018, according to the game's creator, 40,000 copies have been sold. As of 17 April 2022 the game sold 100,000 copies.
