= OverKill (video game) =

1992 video game

- Developer(s): Tech-Noir
- Publisher(s): Epic MegaGames (US); Precision Software Publishing (UK)
- Producer(s): Mark Rein
- Designer(s): Ste Cork
- Artist(s): Martin Holland
- Composer(s): Anthony Williams
- Platform(s): MS-DOS
- Release: NA: 1992
- Genre(s): Scrolling shooter
- Mode(s): Single-player

OverKill, also known as OverKill: The Six-Planet Mega Blast, is a vertically scrolling shooter developed by Tech-Noir and published by Epic MegaGames in 1992. The game was designed by Ste Cork with help from Martin Holland. Ste Cork declared the registered version freeware on July 23, 2008.

== Plot ==
A pilot has been handed a very difficult assignment to destroy the menacing alien forces that have captured six planets in a neighboring allied solar system. The aliens have enslaved all of the inhabitants of the planets and must be killed.

== Gameplay ==
The objective in Overkill is to destroy all enemies on a planet, thus restoring order. The ship has some basic necessities such as fuel, shields, and a weapon, but it can be upgraded by picking up various goodies. Being hit by projectiles or running into enemy ships and walls damages the ship. Once the shield meter is depleted, the ship is destroyed and a life is lost.

== Development ==
After the Commodore 64 market was declining, Martin Holland went on to do art for games that ran on systems of the time. Together with Ste Cork (who came up with the concept), they developed OverKill. Sales for the game were successful due to the solid EGA graphics. After the game's release, Ste Cork had no plans to do a follow-up. This was one of the few games that supported the digital gameport on Amstrad PCs for Atari-compatible joysticks.

== Reception ==
Computer Gaming World stated that Overkill "provides a graphically attractive package. Music and sound effects are also handled capably ... those who like challenging play will feel right at home".
