= Dreadline Express =

- Developer: David Konečný
- Publisher: Shoreline Games
- Engine: Unity
- Platform: Windows
- Release: 16 October 2026
- Genre: Action-adventure
- Mode: Single-player

Dreadline Express is an adventure game and psychological horror game developed by an independent Czech developer David Konečný. The game combines exploration, detective investigation and nonlinear storytelling with a card-based gameplay mechanic. It was released on October 16, 2026, for Microsoft Windows. The game is published by Shoreline Games.

The game takes place aboard the last human train travelling through a world devastated by an apocalypse inspired by the works of American writer H. P. Lovecraft. The player gradually uncovers the history of the train, its passengers and their own identity through exploration, conversations and a card-based system representing objects, information and fragments of the story.

== Gameplay ==
Dreadline Express is a single-player adventure game played from a first-person perspective. The main focus is on exploring the train, interacting with its passengers and gradually uncovering connections between individual events. Rather than relying primarily on conventional dialogue choices and inventory mechanics, the game uses a card-based system.

The cards represent, among other things, acquired knowledge, objects, thoughts and parts of conversations. The player can examine them and use them when interacting with characters and objects. Some situations can be solved by combining multiple cards, unlocking additional information or ways to progress. According to the game's creator, the cards are intended as an alternative to conventional dialogue trees.

The game is based on exploration and deduction. The player is not always given an explicit objective, and progress can depend on recognising connections between pieces of information acquired during the game. David Konečný describes this approach as a "metroidbrainia", a type of game in which progression is primarily based on the player's knowledge and understanding of the game world.

== Story ==
The story takes place in an alternate version of the first half of the 20th century, in which an apocalyptic event inspired by Lovecraftian cosmic horror has devastated Earth. Civilization has been destroyed, and a small group of survivors travels aboard the last human train through the devastated landscape.

The player takes the role of one of the passengers, who wakes up in their compartment without clear memories of their past. During the journey, they meet the other passengers and gradually uncover their stories and the secrets of the train itself. The player's own identity and past also form part of the central mystery.

The train itself is one of the central mysteries of the story. Its survival is connected to dark rules and the fate of its individual passengers. The player gradually discovers not only what happened to the world outside the train, but also how its inhabitants are able to continue their journey.

Thematically, the game draws on existential and cosmic horror. Konečný has cited Lovecraft's depiction of horror based on human helplessness in the face of forces beyond human understanding as one of the game's major inspirations.

== Development ==
Dreadline Express is developed by Czech independent developer David Konečný from Olomouc. Other artists are also involved in the project. In 2025, the game had been in active production for approximately one year. In July of the same year, Dreadline Express was presented at the Game Access conference in Brno, where it won the main award of the conference as well as the Best Pitch Award.

During development, the project expanded from a solo development effort to involve additional creators. Shoreline Games became the publisher of the game and is involved in its release and promotion.

A public demo of the game was released on June 15, 2026. The full version was announced for October 16, 2026.

== Reception ==
Dreadline Express won the Best Game and Best Pitch awards at the Game Access 2025 Indie Showcase. At the Game Access 2026 Indie Showcase, it won the Best Gameplay award.
