= Rytíři Grálu =

1996 video game

- Developer(s): Centauri Production
- Publisher(s): Vochozka Trading
- Release: 1996
- Genre(s): Adventure

Rytíři Grálu is a 1996 Czech adventure video game.

== Production ==
The game was the first Czech attempt at the dungeon crawler video game format. Root.cz asserted that it was the first serious Czech video gaming project to be successful in terms of commercial sales.

== Plot and gameplay ==
The narrative is based on the story of Excalibur. In this game, Arthur returns without his sword and "gets sick".

A certain combination of keys will cause the destruction of enemies.

== Critical reception ==
Bonusweb.cz noted its dark atmosphere and the amount of empty screens between important locations, adding that the title failed to live up to its potential. Root.cz felt the game's graphics were not great but understandable due to the limitations of the local Czech resources at the time.
