= Dark Train =

2016 video game

- Developer: Paperash Studio
- Designer: Vojtěch Vaněk
- Programmer: Jaroslav Hrdlička
- Writer: Vojtěch Vaněk
- Composers: Stanislav Abrahám; Jan Burian; Ann 2.35f
- Series: Dark Train
- Engine: Unity
- Platforms: Windows, OS X
- Release: 25 October 2016
- Genres: Adventure, puzzle
- Mode: Single-player

Dark Train is a puzzle adventure game by Paperash Studio. It was released on 25 October 2016. Dark Train is described as an atmospheric adventure game with unconventional game mechanics. The game uses elements of steampunk and noir fiction mixed with fantasy elements.

== Gameplay ==
The game is controlled by a mouse. The mouse cursor is represented by a mechanical squid, Ann 2.35f. Ann 2.35f controls the eponymous Dark Train which is described by developers as a mechanical "Tamagotchi." The player's task is to get the train to the client. Every wagon of the train represents a certain world. Players can change their order which affects the train. The player is to explore the behavior of the train and its secrets. Players can also find small creatures that they can raise, which will help them with the train. Players will eventually face consequences of their actions during the game when the train reaches its destination. The player will eventually get through three worlds that feature slightly different gameplay.

=== Story ===
The story of the game is told visually without spoken or written dialogue. The game centers on the eponymous Dark Train. It is the last creation of genius inventor D. W. Tagrezbung. The train was ordered by a mysterious client. The client wanted a functional model of the human world but without humans. Tagrezbung worked on it by day and night and finally finished the job. The train consists of wagons and each wagon represents an environment on its own. Tagrezbung died on the day he finished the train. The story follows Ann 2.35f on her journey to get the Dark train to the Client.

=== Ann 2.35f ===
Ann 2.35f is a mechanical squid and the protagonist of the game. She represents the cursor but also has her "own head." She can get scared and in such case she hides or waits. She has multiple abilities. She can enter the inventory, camouflage, and learn to emulate various shapes and objects to which she may subsequently transform. Her eyes serve as an indicator. Their glow can signal a warning or inform the player about changes in the status of the train. She can be repaired in her engine room.

Players can also meet her "sisters" during the game. They have their own heads and interests and are not always friendly towards Ann.

=== Worlds ===
The player starts in the World of the Inventor. This world serves as a place where the player learns to control the train and game mechanics. The player later gets to the World of Transparent lands. It uses a different scale and takes place outside of the train. There are many threats and players must use their knowledge of the train to succeed. There are also new ways to control the train. The player ends their journey in the World of the Client. There are different rules and conditions. Game mechanics here are different than those from the other worlds.

== Development ==
Dark Train was an idea of Vojtěch Vaněk's Prague-based indie studio Paperash Studio. The studio previously made some animation projects with similar technics that were later used in Dark Train. Paperash were in contact with experienced developers from other Czech studios such as Bohemia Interactive, Madfinger Games or CBE Software. They helped with programming of the game. The game was announced in November 2014. The game was developed with use of the Unity engine.

=== Graphics ===
The graphics use cut-out animation. It is cut from the paper at first. It is then pen drawn and in the end it is digitalized and post produced. Developers mentioned that the game's world grew together with its model in the real world. Developers noted that they continue the tradition of Czech animation and that they themselves previously created two short animated films, Strap and Box.

=== Greenlight campaign and release ===
Developers started their Greenlight campaign on 12 November 2015 to allow the game to be released on Steam and also to introduce it to a non-Czech audience. Dark Train hit TOP20 on 16 November 2015 and was Greenlighted on 22 November 2015. It received overall 2,154 yes votes, had 5,899 unique visitors and 230 followers. Dark Train was released for Steam on 25 October 2016.

=== Deep into the City 1 ===
Deep into the City 1 is a free update released on 2 December 2016, which added new levels. There are three new levels. They include Basketball playground, Harp Room and Factory of Panzer Ritter. The player can get new upgrades for the Train in the new levels.

=== Frozen to the Metal ===
Frozen to the Metal is the second free update for Dark Train. It was released on 20 December 2016. It adds three winter levels. It also added new event Frozen to the Metal but it was active only until the end of January 2017.

=== Demo ===
The demo of Dark Train was released on 9 March 2017.

=== Deep Into The City 2 ===
Deep into the City 2 is a free update released on 5 April. It adds a new location and other content. It also disables some content from Frozen to the Metal until winter.

== Reception ==
Dark Train has received very positive reviews from critics. Chris Priestman of Kill Screen commented that the game reminds gamers of 1990s films by Alex Proyas. He praised the game's "shrouded" storytelling and also praised the game's complexity.

Lukáš Grygar of Games.cz gave Dark Train 9 points of 10. He mentioned that the game can remind gamers of titles by Amanita Design but it changes when "the train speeds up." He praised the artistic execution of the game. He noted the game's visuals and music that complement each other. He also praised the hard difficulty and high replay value. Games.cz also selected Dark Train the best adventure game of 2016 and one of the best games of 2016.

Dark Train was nominated for six Czech Game of the Year Awards. It has along with Samorost 3 the most nominations for the awards. It was nominated in categories Best Game, Best PC/Console Game, Best Audio, Best Game Design, Best Story and Best Visuals. Winners were announced on 10 February 2016. Dark Train has won award in category Best Visuals. Dark Train had participated in the International Video Game Contest at Anifilm 2017.

== Legacy ==
On 16 May 2017, Paperash Studio announced the prequel under the title Dark Train: Coupe. Unlike the original game, Coupe is to be a text adventure game. The idea is to give the players an opportunity to make decisions that will influence the game's progress and eventually the ending in a non-linear way. The protagonist is Ann Tagrezbung from the times when she was a human.
