= Polylithic =

- Developer: polyperfect
- Engine: Unity
- Platform: Windows
- Release: 25 August 2026
- Genre: Survival
- Modes: Single-player; Multiplayer

Polylithic is a 2026 survival video game developed by polyperfect. The game is set in prehistoric times and combines survival, base building, crafting and tribe management elements. It entered early access on 9 November 2023, with the full version released on 25 August 2026.

== Gameplay ==
The player takes on the role of a leader of a prehistoric tribe. They explore an open world, hunt animals, gather resources, craft tools and weapons, and build and expand a settlement. As the game progresses, the player unlocks new technologies and can assign various tasks to members of the tribe. The game features both a story mode and a sandbox mode, as well as cooperative multiplayer.

== Story ==
The story mode follows the development of a prehistoric tribe from a nomadic way of life towards a more settled society. The player gradually leads the tribe through migration, the acquisition of new technologies and the construction of settlements.

== Development ==
The game was developed by the independent studio polyperfect. Polylithic originally entered early access in November 2023, during which it was expanded with new gameplay mechanics, content and bug fixes. Multiplayer was added to the game on 8 October 2025. The full version was released on 25 August 2026.
