= Hlava Kasandry =

1993 video game

- Developer: LetDisk
- Platform: Atari ST
- Release: 1993
- Genres: Adventure, RPG, simulator

Hlava Kasandry (English: Cassandra's Head) is a 1993 Czech video game, developed by Marek Nepožitek's company LetDisk and based on the Polish novel Głowa Kasandry. It was released on the Atari ST but is compatible with Atari TT and Atari Falcon.

== Production ==
The creators of the game worked in their free time. The development was influenced by the inexperience of developers who had to learn a lot of things during their work on the game. They included a number of features that they retrospectively deemed unnecessary. The game was then tested by friends of the game authors. Piracy was a major issue at the time of the game. The authors therefore gave particular focus to copy protection. They had experience of copying games themselves, and therefore decided to create a particularly effective protection to prevent pirates from cracking the game. Unfortunately, this protection made it impossible to create physical copies or floppy images for use in emulators.

In 2004, Marek Nepožitek, then a co-founder of Cinemax, decided to re-release Hlava Kasandry, whose play on various platforms had previously been prevented by anti-piracy protection. He had to work around this, and did not find a solution until 2014; a free version for emulators was released in December 2014.

== Plot and gameplay ==
The game is set for the future, when a handful of people have to survive in a world destroyed by a massive nuclear conflict. The game follows the story of Teodor Hornice, who deals with the destruction of dangerous warheads. He must destroy a rocket name Kassandra that could destroy the planet.

The game is a mix of adventure, RPG and simulator. It is played with a joystick and a mouse. While players search for the missing rocket, they must pay attention to fuel and life while avoiding radioactive areas.

== Critical reception ==
At the time of release, the game was accepted by the reviewers. The game received a rating of 76% from Narsil and 71% from Excalibur.
