= Pound of Ground =

2009 video game

- Developer: Centauri Production
- Publisher: Akella
- Platform: Windows
- Release: RUS: 9 December 2009; WW: 5 November 2010 (English, Online)
- Genre: Shooter

Pound of Ground (Czech: Půl Kila Mletýho) is shooter game for Microsoft Windows developed by Centauri Production and published by Akella on 9 December 2009. The game received poor reviews.

== Reception ==
IGN listed off a series of weaknesses of the game including "unlikeable characters", "unimaginative quest goals", "bland action", "disposable story scenes", and "awful voice acting", ultimately deeming it disposible.
