= Gumboy: Crazy Adventures =

2006 video game

- Developer(s): Cinemax
- Publisher(s): Cinemax
- Producer(s): Lukáš Macura; Marek Nepožitek
- Designer(s): Miroslav Adamus; Erik Codl; Vojtech Pecka
- Writer(s): Miroslav Adamus
- Composer(s): Martin Linda
- Platform(s): Microsoft Windows
- Release: July 21, 2006
- Genre(s): Platform
- Mode(s): Single-player

Gumboy: Crazy Adventures is a physics-based platform game released over Steam in 2006. It was developed by Czech developer CINEMAX, Ltd.

== Gameplay ==
In Gumboy, the player controls the rotation of a physically simulated ball. You move around large, abstract levels by spinning, completing various goals and collecting powerups. Powerups can modify the shape of the Gumboy (for instance, turning him into a star), change the material of Gumboy (into gum, air, or water), or give the Gumboy special powers, such as the ability to stick to level features. In most levels, the Gumboy must acquire the magnetism powerup, which allows him to repel objects, and then guide objects to an NPC creature.

== Reception ==
The game was generally well received by critics. Hyper's Tim Henderson commends the game for being "original, charming and incredibly atmospheric". However, he criticised it for "some moments of frustration".

== Legacy ==
In May 2008, a sequel was released titled Gumboy Tournament. The main addition to this game was multiplayer, both locally and online for up to nine players.
