= Poklad (video game) =

1984 video game

- Developer: František Fuka
- Publisher: Proxima Software
- Release: 1984
- Genre: Interactive fiction

Poklad (English: Treasure) is a 1984 Czech text adventure video game for the ZX Spectrum and compatible systems, authored by František Fuka as his first text video game. It was published by Proxima Software as part of their "Fuxoft uvádí" series, with a newer version of the game (as opposed to a sequel) entitled Poklad 2 designed in 1985 and released in 1992.

== Plot ==
The player finds themselves in a magical country and their task is to find five treasures. The game consists of a 4 x 5 room matrix in three levels.

== Development ==
Poklad is one of the oldest surviving games created in Czechoslovakia. František Fuka had previously created several games on the VIC-20, however he would sell the computer along with its software to an unknown buyer, and those games would not survive. Fuka, a 16-year-old computer enthusiast, programmed the game on his friend's ZX Spectrum as he didn't have a computer of his own. Fuka first got interested in games after his uncle bought him a copy of Creative Computing magazine, which he wrote for; Fuka began reading reviews and ads for text adventures. He had been inspired to make the game after playing a different game called Poklad (which the thesis The Beginnings of Czech and Slovak Digital Narrativity: The History of Text Computer games in Czechoslovakia surmises as a translation of a Western game) on the ZX81 computer. Fuka programmed it entirely from memory.

Poklad is considered a beta version of Poklad 2, for this reason Fuka himself deems Boxing (1985) his first video game and he expressly acknowledges the first game's non-existence. Poklad 2 was translated into English, although Fuka does not remember who did the translation. Poklad is sometimes considered the first Czechoslovak game, however depending on the definition earlier video games may have existed through the 1970s. Text-based adventures would become the most popular video gaming genre throughout the second half of the 1980s, with over 500 games created; this is because they were easy to make (one developer could make a game in 2-3 weeks), and easy to translate to Western languages.

Fuka created the title without any expectation of financial gain. The Czechoslovak video gaming development industry was predominantly young high school or college aged males who attended computer clubs, and who made games individually. This made it difficult for the amateur one-team developers to complete with Western professional companies. Fuka would proclaim in 1998: "The few individuals that make games in our country can naturally hardly compete with teams of specialists, for whom making games is not only fun, but also a job (a paid one, of course). One person can hardly be a good author of a game idea, a programmer, a graphic artist, a musician and also have enough time to pull it all off".

== Reception ==
Tiscali.cz thought it was a very simple and short attempt at a game, but that it offered a great foreshadowing of where Fuka's career would end up.
