= Boovie =

1998 video game

- Developer(s): Future Games
- Publisher(s): Future Games
- Composer(s): Ondrej Matejka
- Platform(s): MS-DOS
- Release: CZ: 1998
- Genre(s): Puzzle

Boovie is a 1998 Czech puzzle video game by Future Games for MS-DOS released in early 1998. It came out on CD-ROM in January 1999. Based on the game Boovie (1994) for ZX Spectrum. The sequel, Boovie 2 (1998) for ZX Spectrum, is by a different authors (E.S.A. Production - Tuleby, Max, Factor6).

== Gameplay ==
The player controls Boovie, and must push a bright brick into a teleporter to progress to the next level. The game has 20 to 40 levels, depending on the selected difficulty.

== Development ==
Boovie is a remake of the game of the same name, which the authors programmed in 1994 for the ZX Spectrum. It's a game inspired by Flappy (1983). After the game, the developers had long tried to create a second part in spring 1999. None of the authors however didn't last long and the project died. The game has been translated into English.

== Reception ==
The game is Bonusweb's favourite from Future Games, who noted similarities between Boovie and another game from the studio named Bloodie.

== See also ==
- Video games in the Czech Republic
