= Scarlet Deer Inn =

- Developer: Attu Games
- Publisher: Attu Games
- Designer: Eva Navrátilová
- Programmer: Lukáš Navrátil
- Platforms: Windows, Nintendo Switch
- Release: 21 July 2026 (Windows); 29 October 2026 (Nintendo Switch)
- Genres: Platform, Action-adventure
- Mode: Single-player

Scarlet Deer Inn is an action-adventure platform game developed by Attu Games.

== Plot ==
Story is about Eliška, who is the mother of two children. After an unexpected tragedy, she is forced out into the world and explores a lot of unusual and dark places. The heroine is protected by the ray not only from darkness, but also from the threat of death.

== Development ==
The game was announced on 19 February 2021. The game was initially to use traditional animation but developers decided to switch to embroidered fabric graphics. Each block of animation is first created on an embroidery machine before being transferred to the digital world. The game is inspired by medieval Europe and Slavic folklore, while the creators also refer to The Witcher as an inspiration.

On 29 April 2023 Attu Games uploaded a 11-second clip to Twitter which got over 40,000 retweets and around 24 million views earning the game wider recognition. Attu Games announced on 10 June 2026 that Scarlet Deer would release for Windows on 21 July 2026. On 29 October 2026 it was released for Nintendo Switch. Versions for Xbox Series X/S are set for later release.
