= Oil Empire =

1996 video game

- Developer(s): 88th Panzer Division
- Publisher(s): ABA Denver
- Release: 1996

Oil Empire is a 1996 managerial/simulation strategy game developed by 88th Panzer Division and published by ABA Denver company.
