= František Fuka =

Czech computer programmer and musician

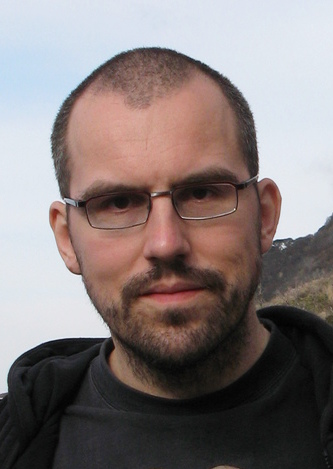
- Fuka in 2007
- Born: 9 October 1968 (age 57); Prague, Czechoslovakia
- Other name: Fuxoft
- Known for: games programming, computer music, movie translations, film reviews, blogging
- Website: www.fuxoft.cz

František Fuka (pronounced [ˈfraɲcɪʃɛk ˈfuka]; born 9 October 1968 in Prague) is a Czech computer programmer and musician. He works as a film translator, preparing English-language movies for Czech release. He is known also as a film critic, publicist and commentator.

František Fuka is one of the pioneers of blogging in the Czech Republic. His website FFFilm gradually became one of the important sources among Czech film sites. The newspaper Lidové noviny ranked him among the top six influential personalities of the Czech internet in 2004.

Until 2023, František Fuka was a member of one of the oldest-running Czech radio podcasts, Odvážné palce.

== Games for ZX Spectrum ==
Fuka developed several video games for the ZX Spectrum with the Czechoslovak programming group Golden Triangle. As a member of the group, he was introduced in 2016 to the Czech video game Hall of Fame. Fuka has also been noted as an influence on other Slovak game developers.

- Belegost (with Miroslav Fídler)
- Boxing
- Poklad
- Poklad 2
- Bowling 2000
- Indiana Jones a Chrám zkázy
- Indiana Jones 2
- Indiana Jones 3
- Jet-Story (with Miroslav Fídler)
- Kaboom!
- Planet of Shades (with Miroslav Fídler)
- Podraz 3
- F.I.R.E.
- Tetris 2

== Bibliography ==
- Fuka, František (1987). Počítačové hry I [Computer Games I] (PDF) (in Czech). Beroun: Zenitcentrum HZ ÚV SSM.
- Fuka, František (1988). Počítačové hry II [Computer Games II] (PDF) (in Czech). Beroun: Zenitcentrum HZ ÚV SSM.
- Fuka, František (1993). Hry pro PC [Games for PC] (in Czech). Brno: Cybex.
