= Gooka =

1997 Czech adventure video game

Gooka is a 1997 Czech adventure video game developed and published by JRC Interactive. It is based on the novel Gooka a Dračí lidé (Gooka and Dragon People), which was written under the name Richard D. Evans by Czechoslovak writer Vlado Ríša. The player takes the role of Gooka, who is accused of murdering his own father, and is tasked with proving his innocence and unmasking the true killer. This game was the first Czech adventure game to run exclusively on Windows.

On June 25, 2004, an adventure/RPG sequel was released titled Gooka: The Mystery of Janatris. It was developed by Centauri Production and published by Cenega Publishing. The project was announced on December 12, 2001. After nearly a year of development, the team announced they would be incorporating a new game technology entitled CPAL3D. The plot sees the player finding a cure for their poisoned wife and finding their kidnapped son. The game was released in Czech in June 2004, and an English demo was available on August 3, 2004. By September 2004, English, Czech and French translations had been completed, while Polish, Spanish, Italian, German and Russian translations were in progress. The German version was released on March 9, 2005. The game was presented at the Cenega Publishing booth at E3 2004. Just Adventure felt the title ended up being added to the pile of mediocre adventure games.

== See also ==
- Video games in the Czech Republic
