= Polda =

Czech adventure video game series

- Cover of the box set of the first five Polda games
- Genre: Adventure
- Developer: SleepTeam
- Platforms: Windows; DOS; Android; iOS
- First release: Polda 1; 20 December 1998
- Latest release: Polda 2 Remaster; 12 December 2023

Polda is a Czech adventure video game series developed by SleepTeam which began with the release of Polda 1 in 1998. The main character is a policeman, Pankrác. In some of the sequels he is a private detective. Polda 1 was the best selling game in the Czech Republic in 1999, it is also the most popular Czech adventure games series.

== Sequels ==
Polda spawned seven sequels between 1998–2022, developed by Zima Software. So far only the sixth sequel and the mobile version of the first three games have been translated into English. The eighth sequel, Polda 8, is to be released in 2026 with a crowdfunding campaign already on.

== Series ==
Release timeline
1998	Polda 1
1999	Polda 2
2000	Polda 3
2001
2002	Polda 4
2003
2004
2005	Polda 5
2006
2007
2008
2009
2010
2011
2012
2013
2014	Polda 6
2015
2016
2017
2018
2019
2020
2021
2022	Polda 7
2023	Polda 2 Remaster

=== Polda 1 ===
Polda 1 was released in 1998 on Windows and DOS, it was created by SleepTeam and produced by Zima Software. The game has 2D cartoon style graphics and contains many humorous scenes. The story follows a cop called Pankrác, who is investigating strange kidnappings in the village Lupany. There is also a mobile version for Android and iOS.

=== Polda 2 ===
The license remained in the hands of Martin Zima, and following unsuccessful legal action, SleepTeam lost any percentage of the sale of future Polda games. Polda 2 was then created by Zima Software in 1999. The cop Pankrác is investigating a fire in a hotel in the city of Marsias, which leads him to uncover a secret DNA enhancement and human cloning plot.

In 2010 the game was re-released for the iOS mobile platforms and later on Android, where it was translated into English and French under the title: Awesome Cop.

=== Polda 3 ===
Polda 3 was released in 2000. This time as a private investigator, Pankrác solves the case of a kidnapped cook who works for the famous hockey player Jaromír Jégr (a parody of the real hockey player, Jaromír Jágr), eventually Pankrác has to save the entire world. Also available for Android and iOS. This was originally intended to be the final Polda game, finishing the trilogy.

=== Polda 4 ===
Polda 4 was released in 2002, departing from the previous artistic style by incorporating a hybrid 2D / 3D design. Using a time machine, Pankrác travels through time and gets into a fictional near future, where, for example, the Soviet Communists dominated the world. Also for Android and iOS. It was translated into Polish as: Strażnik Czasu ("Time Guardian").

=== Polda 5 ===
Polda 5 was released in 2005. Pankrác is traveling in time again, helping a secret organization. Using time travel, Pankrác arrives in ancient Greece. It was translated into Italian under the title: Polda - Agente 610 ("Polda - Agent 610") and into Russian as: Пан Польда и тайны времени ("Mr. Polda and the Secret of Time").

=== Polda 6 ===
Polda 6 was released in 2014. This time, Pankrác is investigating the disappearing of the Oscar winners list. Also available for Android and iOS. It was translated into English and German under the title: Detective Hayseed - Hollywood.

=== Polda 7 ===
The seventh sequel, Polda 7, was crowdfunded on the Hithit server, thanks to the popular demand the entire required sum has been gathered during the first few days. Polda solves the case of an alien flying machine and attends a meeting of the world celebrities. The game was released in April 2022.

=== Polda 8 ===
Polda 8 is the upcoming sequel of the Polda series, planned for the year 2026. The story is supposed to revolve around time travel and the kidnapping of detective Pankrác. This will be his last sequel featuring Pankrác, as the voice actor is retiring. Instead of two protagonists, Polda 8 will have three playable characters. Despite another time travel plot, the cast of this sequel will be more modest, meaning no celebrities unlike in the previous two entries.

== Critical reception ==
The first game in the series was a huge success and became the best selling game in the Czech Republic of the year 1999.

Bonusweb.cz rated the first seven games in the series at 91%, 71%, 72%, 77%, 60%, 60% and 45% respectively.

== See also ==
- Video games in the Czech Republic
