= Dark Lands (video game) =

2013 video game

- Developer: Mingle Games
- Publishers: Mingle Games; Bulkypix
- Designer: Vladislav Spevak
- Programmer: Jiri Formanek
- Engine: Cocos2d-x
- Platforms: Windows Phone, Android, iOS
- Release: 12 December 2013
- Genre: Endless Runner
- Mode: Single-player

Dark Lands is an indie video game by Czech company Mingle Games. It was released in 2013 exclusively for Windows Phone. The game was scheduled to be released for iOS and Android in 2014. It was originally planned to fund these versions with Kickstarter but the campaign was unsuccessful.

== Gameplay ==
Dark Land is a Hack 'n slash infinity runner. The player has to jump over obstacles or slide under others, such as whirling blades. There are also enemies they have to fight. Players can also stop running.

== Plot ==
The story is told through a slideshow without text. It is about a brave knight who faces evil powers that have invaded the land.

== Development ==
Dark Lands is the third game by Mingle Games. It was preceded by Save the Birds and Dwarven Hammer. The former was a success while the latter was a failure.

After Dwarven Hammer, the developers decided to stop making video games that they believed to be popular and instead to focus on games that they would play. Members of the team are all fans of fantasy and horror themes. They were influenced by works of Frank Miller (Sin City and 300). Another inspiration was Limbo with its black-silhouette graphics. To make more animations with lower memory requirements, they used skeletal animations instead of sprites.

At that point, the only problem was budget. Mingle Games decided to participate in AppCampus and applied for funding from the AppCampus program, and in the end were selected. This required the game be released exclusively for Windows Phone for a period of three months.

The game was developed with only core gameplay and a limited amount of bosses and enemies, and only two game worlds. The development took 6 months. The game was released in December 2013. It gained promotional help from Nokia and Microsoft and some press. The game reached 1,600,000 downloads on Windows Phone (as of April 2014) and became the most successful project of AppCampus. Developers decided to port the game to other platforms such as iOS and Android. These versions are published by Bulkypix. The game was released for IOS and Android on May 8, 2014

The iOS, Android and Windows versions were originally to be funded through Kickstarter campaign. It was cancelled with US$4,081 raised of the $10,000 goal.

== Reception ==
Dark Lands received mostly positive reviews. The game was praised for its visuals and gameplay.

However, Pocket Gamer published a negative review. It criticized the level design, unresponsive controls and a frustrating gating. The reviewer also noted that components for a decent game are present but "are hacked to death" by these elements.
