= Světák Bob =

1993 video game

- Title screen
- Release: 1993
- Genre: Adventure

Světák Bob is a 1993 Czech adventure game developed by Bohewia and published by Petr Vochozka for the Amiga system.

== Production ==
The game was programmed for the Amiga by a pre-18 Petr Vochozka. After buying his own Atari 800 XL he began programming his own games that ended up in his desk drawer. A year after the Velvet Revolution, Vochozka replaced his Atari with the Amiga, and created his first game intended for public release, Svetak Bob. As he was younger than 18, distribution of the game was illegal as he did not have a trade license.

Petr Vochozka marketed Světák Bob as the first ever Czech commercial adventure for the Amiga. It was priced at 129 crowns and sold around 100 to 200 copies. This compares with Vochozka's follow-up Tajemství Oslího ostrova which sold 2,000 copies.

Světák Bob was the first officially distributed Czech computer game for the Amiga, and arguably on any platform.

According to the reviewer Tomáš Smolík in Excalubur, the game was programmed in the Amos Professional Kit.

Prague Post notes that this achievement was a part of a wave of post-Soviet Union advances that saw the Czech video gaming industry quickly became more professional.

In the 21st century the game gained a considerable cult following.

Bonusweb notes that in 1994 it was still possible for a developer to review their own game, noting that Vochozka did this for Svetak Bob in the magazine Excalibur. In an interview with Vochozka, Bonusweb wrote: ""No, I definitely didn't write it myself, but I worked a little bit on it," he says with a smile. "Moreover, there was a different time at that time, it wasn't a big deal if the Světák sold eighty pieces instead of forty ...".

== Plot and gameplay ==
The main hero, Bob, collapses after a fierce storm and finds himself on a desert island. He has to get off the island and continue his adventure.

A hybrid between the text and classic point & click adventure, the game offers similar gameplay to text-based games, but includes graphics and music. The game is mouse-controlled.

== Critical reception ==
According to Bonusweb.cz, the game's graphics were just a little better than horrible. BRNO Region asserts that the game was not a true global success. Vochozka later said the game wasn't "worldly". Amiga Review unfavourably compared it to Testament. At the time Exaclibur didn't give Czech games a rating to avoid discouraging local developers. Som Hráč argues the game was "quite a good success". Mafia felt the game was a "great success " that opened the door for other Czech games.

SME notes that this post-Iron Curtain era of gaming is marked by a national technological backwardness that had a flow-on effect to "scant technological and artistic abilities of potential game developers", adding that while good ideas were a dime a dozen, it was difficult to find top wuality graphics in local games.
