= UFO: Extraterrestrials =

2007 video game

- Developer: Chaos Concept
- Publishers: NA: Tri Synergy; EU: Paradox Interactive
- Designers: IRou. Michal Doležal
- Programmer: Petr Fiedler
- Composer: Dmitry Lugovoy
- Platform: Microsoft Windows
- Release: May 1, 2007
- Genre: Turn-based strategy
- Mode: Single-player

UFO: Extraterrestrials is a turn-based strategy game for Windows aimed to be a spiritual sequel to UFO: Enemy Unknown (released in North America under the name X-Com: UFO Defense). Developed by Chaos Concept, the game incorporates a twist of the aliens defeating the humans on Earth. The game takes place on a human-colonized planet named Esperanza, where the alien threat has just arrived. An updated version of the game, UFO: Extraterrestrials Platinum, was released in 2023.

== Gameplay ==
Gameplay in UFO: Extraterrestrials is similar to the original X-COM games. The player starts out with a base where they can add buildings, allocate scientists, equip soldiers and vehicles, manufacture equipment, etc. Additional bases can be bought in different countries but are used mainly for housing interceptors. Most buildings cannot be built in bases other than your main base.

The research side of the game is extensive, with about 120 projects to complete. These projects lead to improved weaponry, equipment, and understanding of the aliens.

When a UFO is spotted on the global view (or "geoscape") the player must send interceptors to shoot it down. Once the UFO has been shot down the player can send in a transport of soldiers to carry out a tactical mission to neutralize the aliens and capture their equipment. Alien commanders can also be captured for interrogation.

The tactical missions are turn based, with no real-time option. The tactical squad that is sent to the crash site can include robots and tanks as well as soldiers; tanks and robots take up more space in the transport, however, and space is limited. Tactical missions can take approximately 30 minutes and there are about 200 pre-made levels. When a mission begins a level is chosen according to the environment where the action takes place; the environment in missions is destructible.

The aliens can start a tactical mission if they attack any of the player's bases. Aliens can attack the player's base with UFOs, in which case it is a fight between your SAM sites and the UFO; if the SAM sites are destroyed, a tactical mission within your base will take place (or aliens will take it over in which case the player needs to send a transport ship). The aliens may also initiate a terror mission against any country; in this scenario the environment is a city with civilians in it.

The more aliens a soldier kills the more experience he receives (tanks and robots do not gain experience). There are rank insignias that show this and titles linked with each; when a soldier accumulates enough experience they go up a rank. Soldiers lose experience when they are recovering from injuries in the hospital; they can even lose a rank if they are in there long enough, but when a soldier comes back from the hospital they will gain experience faster for a time.

== Plot ==
In the year 2023 the spaceship Magelhaes finally reaches the planet Esperanza and the people on board quickly begin development of a colony. Several governments take control over the different continents and all was good until one day in the year 2025 a squad of pilots encounter an unknown alien force and get shot down. Now the governments give you the task to not only defend the planet but also find out where the aliens come from to take the fight back to them.

== Release and reception ==
UFO: Extraterrestrials was first released for digital download via the Matrix Games website on May 1, 2007. It received a retail release the same year in North America on May 21, and in Europe on June 29.

UFO: Extraterrestrials received mixed reviews on Metacritic. Eurogamer said it is a flawed clone and recommended it only to X-COM fans who couldn't wait to see what 2K Games did with the license. IGN disliked how closely it followed the original X-COM and said the few deviations were poorly done.

The August 2008 edition of Pelit featured a retrospective of UFO: Extraterrestrials that focused on the effects mods have had on the game. Long-time reviewer Niko Nirvi, a strong admirer of the original UFO: Enemy Unknown, described the original UFO: Extraterrestrials as a pleasant but visibly rushed substitute. He focused on "Bman's Ease of Use Mod 4.07 (fixed by Coasty)" as the prevailing merger of minor modifications, and pronounced it "the true successor of [UFO: Enemy Unknown]" that "genuinely achieves some of its predecessor's magic." According to the magazine, the more visible features of Bman's mod are added weaponry, incorporation of the original UFO: Enemy Unknown enemies (although graphically by copying and enlarging the older game's sprites), improving AI and rebalancing the game mechanics by changing them towards those of UFO: Enemy Unknown.

== Prequel ==
In September 2009, Chaos Concept unveiled a new website announcing a prequel, UFO2Extraterrestrials: Shadows over Earth, which has been in development since early 2009. Some of the announced improvements to the game include dynamic lighting (night missions complete with the need for light sources), and naval forces in the geoscape phase of the game (such as heavy aircraft carrier/cruisers that can launch fighters and defenses against UFOs).

After many failed release date attempts, Chaos Concept decided to withdraw a release date from the game's completely, but have since changed announced a new released date of Q4 2013 and the game was re-titled as UFO2Extraterrestrials: Battle for Mercury. Estimated release dates ranged from 2014 to 2020. The game was eventually released on 15 June 2021.
