= TurtleStrike =

2013 video game

- Logo
- Developer: eeGon Games
- Platforms: iOS; Android
- Release: WW: 25 July 2013
- Genres: Strategy, turn-based tactics, turn-based strategy, wargame
- Mode: Multiplayer

TurtleStrike is a free to play multiplayer strategy game with live turn-based mechanics developed by the Prague-based eeGon Games. Both players have limited time to plan their moves and then the moves of both players are processed simultaneously. The concept combines board game playing principles like those of Battleship with fast-paced strategy games, role-playing games and tactical turn-based games. It is not a classical asynchronous turn-based strategy; players have to play the whole match at once rather than check in and play their turn when it is convenient.

The game available on iOS and Android systems.

== Gameplay ==
Both players start with 10 turtles and the first player who manages to wipe all enemy turtles is the winner. Before the game starts, players have to place their turtles into three formations. The shapes of formations can be customized into different shapes—as long as turtles are touching side to side. Each formation can move, shoot a missile or torpedo, use a shield or a special weapon. The player can obtain achievement points to unlock items in an in-game weapon shop.

=== Tournaments ===
TurtleStrike Organized Play has two forms: ladder play and tournaments. A player can participate in a quick ladder games with gradual progress of competitive play due to being paired with another similarly skilled opponents. The other possibility to compete are the tournaments for various prizes.

== Development and marketing ==
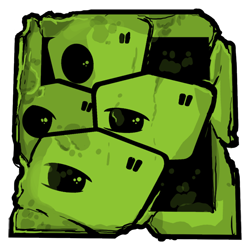
TurtleStrike

The release date was announced by developer for 25 July 2013.

According to the developer, the post release content will include new cosmetic items—turtle skins and environments—as well as new weapons and super weapons. The developer is also planning constant future weapon balancing: "There should be no overpowered weapon combinations in our game and close attention is being paid to the balancing of weapons on different levels."
