= Indiana Jones a Chrám zkázy =

1985 video game

Indiana Jones a Chrám zkázy (Indiana Jones and the Temple of Doom) is a 1985 Czech text adventure game for ZX Spectrum computers and compatible hardware. It was authored by František Fuka. Two sequels were later produced entitled Indiana Jones II (1987) and Indiana Jones III (1990). The trilogy was later released in 1992 by Proxima Software as part of the Fuxoft brand "Fuxoft uvádí".

A continuation of the series was seen with the 1990 release of Indiana Jones a zlatá soška Keltů, programmed by Jiří Fencl. Fencl also wrote a text adventure named Tom Jones. Due to the series' success, the games were ported to other eight-bit home microcomputers by various authors, sometimes containing only text and sometimes with graphics.

== Production ==
František Fuka created Poklad and Poklad 2 in the early 1980s, and these served as a warmup before the designer began making more sophisticated games; his first major project was Indiana Jones a Chrám zkázy. He invented the game during a holiday in Romania, despite him not having seen the movie it was based on. After the movie Indiana Jones and the Temple of Doom was available in cinemas in Czechoslovakia, Fuka was surprised that the Czech title was also Indiana Jones a chrám zkázy, because in his opinion the English name of the movie has different meaning. Indiana Jones II was released as a free sequel in 1987. It was notable for allowing the player to control the menu, which despite slow rendering and item selection was exceptional for the industry. Fuka promoted the title as "the first Czech text game with only three buttons". Indiana Jones III was notable for using a non-standard font upon its release in 1990, which allowed František Fuka to circumvent the display limitations of thirty-two characters per line. The title contained eight spaces for game saves, which was above that of foreign commercial products.

=== Plot and gameplay ===
The three games are video game adaptions of the first three Indiana Jones films. They play as text adventure games controlled by keyboard commands. There are over 30 locations in Indiana Jones a Chrám zkázy, and the player can die in ten of them.

=== Reception ===
Root.cz deemed Indiana Jones II easier than the first title, and deemed Indiana Jones III the best of the trilogy.

Textovky.cz deemed František Fuka a legend within the Czech video gaming industry, and noted that the Indiana Jones trilogy includes three of the five games that gave him this status.
