= Bonez Adventures: Tomb of Fulaos =

2005 video game

- Developer: Bone Artz
- Publisher: Bone Artz
- Platform: Microsoft Windows
- Release: 8 July 2005
- Genre: Action-adventure
- Mode: Single-player

Bonez Adventures: Tomb of Fulaos (Czech: Bonez Adventures: Fulaova Hrobka) is a Czech action-adventure video game developed and published by Bone Artz on 8 July 2005 for Windows.

== Production ==
By March 2007, the game had been localised into Russian, Polish, and Czech.

== Plot and gameplay ==
The player takes the role of archaeologist Marc Bonez, who discovers a mummy that is much older than the tomb in which he lies. It is up to Bonez to discover the truth.

The game is divided into chapters, which each chapter having a different form of gameplay, ranging from an action RPG to a traditional point and click adventure.

== Critical reception ==
Igromania thought it was a weak piece of work. Sector dismissed the title as a clone of Indiana Jones. Gamestar noted how the camera became a hindrance to players when trying to solve puzzles.
