= Jet-Story =

1988 video game

- Developer: Cybexlab Software
- Publisher: Ultrasoft
- Designer: Miroslav Fídler
- Composer: František Fuka
- Platform: ZX Spectrum
- Release: 1988
- Genre: Action
- Mode: Single-player

Jet-Story is a 1988 video game developed by Cybexlab Software and published by Ultrasoft. The game is the sequel to Planet of Shades.

== Development ==
Th game was developed in 1988. The Main Author is Miroslav Fídler who was helped by František Fuka and Tomáš Rylek. Fuka created opening Screen and Composed Music. In 1992 rights to the Game were bought by Ultrasoft that re-released the Game.

== Gameplay ==
The player controls a spacecraft in a huge maze. His task is to destroy 47 enemy bases scattered across the game world that contains 128 areas. The task is not easy as the maze is full of enemies. The player can use weapons to destroy them but has limited amount of ammo. Ammo, fuel, and health can be replenished by boxes scattered throughout the world. The game features realistic gravity.

== Reception ==
The game has been well received. Bit Magazine gave the game 84%. The game was praised mostly for its gameplay and music. The graphics didn't gain such praise due to its simplicity.
