= Czech Game of the Year Awards =

Annual award

- Awarded for: To honor the best Czech-developed video games
- Country: Czech Republic
- First award: 2010
- Final award: 2024
- Website: ceskahraroku.cz

Czech Game of the Year Awards (Czech: Česká hra roku) are annual awards that recognize accomplishments in video game development in the Czech Republic. The awards began as part of Gameday Festival in 2010, but became independent from the festival in 2017. In 2010–2020, the awards were organised by the České Hry association, since 2021, the awards have been organized by FiolaSoft Studio and MediaRealms, with the VisionGame project joining in 2022.

== 2010 ==
The awards for the first year were presented on 7 May 2011. Awards were given in three categories. Mafia II was awarded as the best Czech game in Czech. The jury also expressed recognition to Centauri Production for making their games in Czech. Samurai II: Vengeance was awarded as the best Czech game for Mobile devices and best Czech artistic achievement in game creation.

- Best Czech artistic achievement in game creation - Madfinger Games for Samurai II: Vengeance
- Best Czech Game in Czech - 2K Czech for Mafia II
- Best Czech Game for Mobile Devices - Madfinger Games for Samurai II:Vengeance

== 2011 ==
The 2011 awards were presented on 3 May 2012.

- Best Czech artistic achievement in game creation - Allodium for Infinitum
- Best Czech Game in Czech - Hammerware for Family Farm
- Best Czech Game for Mobile Devices - Madfinger Games for Shadowgun

== 2012 ==
The 2012 awards were presented on 3 May 2013. Only two categories were awarded this time.

- The Technical Contribution to Czech Video Game Creation - Madfinger Games for Dead Trigger and Shadowgun: Deadzone
  - Nominated: Keen Software House for Miner Wars 2081, SCS Software for Euro Truck Simulator 2 and Scania Truck Driving Simulator
- The Artistic Contribution to Czech Video Game Creation - Amanita Design for Botanicula
  - Nominated: Hammerware for Good Folks, Rake in Grass for Northmark: Hour of the Wolf, and Lonely Sock for Coral City

== 2013 ==
The 2013 awards were presented on 10 May 2014.

- The Technical Contribution to Czech Video Game Creation - Bohemia Interactive for ArmA III
  - Nominated: Hyperbolic Magnetism for Lums: The Game of Light and Shadows, Keen Software House for Space Engineers and Madfinger Games for Dead Trigger 2
- The Artistic Contribution to Czech Video Game Creation - Hyperbolic Magnetism for Lums: The Game of Light and Shadows
  - Nominated: Hexage for Reaper: Tale of a Pale Swordsman, Silicon Jelly for Mimpi and Trickster Arts for Hero of Many

== 2014 ==
The 2014 awards were presented on 8 May 2015. There were four categories.

- The Technical Contribution to Czech Video Game Creation - Keen Software House for Medieval Engineers
  - Nominated: Allodium for Infinitum: Battle for Europe, Keen Software House for Medieval Engineers and Cinemax for The Keep
- The Artistic Contribution to Czech Video Game Creation - Dreadlocks Ltd for Dex
  - Nominated: ARK8 for Coraabia, Icarus Games for Time Treasury and CBE Software for J.U.L.I.A. Among the Stars
- The Best Original Game - Madfinger Games for Monzo
  - Nominated: Dreadlocks Ltd for Dex, Czech Games Edition for Galaxy Trucker and Allodium for Infinitum: Battle for Europe
- The Best Debut Game - ARK8 for Coraabia
  - Nominated: Czech Games Edition for Galaxy Trucker, Digital Life productions for Soccerinho and CZ.NIC for Tablexia

== 2015 ==
The 2015 awards were presented on 6 May 2016.

- The Technical Contribution to Czech Video Game Creation - Wube Software for Factorio
  - Nominated: BadFly Interactive for Dead Effect 2, McMagic Productions for Novus Inceptio and Madfinger Games for Unkilled
- The Artistic Contribution to Czech Video Game Creation - Hangonit for Rememoried
  - Nominated: Fiolasoft Studio for Blackhole, Silicon Jelly for Mimpi Dreams and Lukáš Navrátil for Toby: The Secret Mine
- The Best Original Game - Wube Software for Factorio
  - Nominated: Fiolasoft Studio for Blackhole, Charles University for Czechoslovakia 38–89: The Assassination and Lipa Learning for Lipa Theater
- The Best Debut Game - Charles University for Czechoslovakia 38–89: The Assassination
  - Nominated: Wube Software for Factorio, McMagic Productions for Novus Inceptio and Lukáš Navrátil for Toby: The Secret Mine

== 2016 ==
The 2016 awards were presented on 10 February 2017. It was held in Prague for the first time and wasn't part of Gameday. There were 9 categories this time. Nominations were scheduled to be announced on 24 January 2017 but it was pushed to 27 January 2017. Dark Train and Samorost 3 garnered the most nominations at 6 categories each. Chameleon Run was nominated in 5 categories and American Truck Simulator earned 4 nominations. Samorost 3 won the top award as well as two others.

- Czech game of the year - Samorost 3 by Amanita Design
  - Nominated: American Truck Simulator, Chameleon Run and Dark Train
- Czech game of the year for PC/Consoles - Samorost 3 by Amanita Design
  - Nominated: American Truck Simulator, Dark Train and Void Raiders
- Czech game of the year for Mobile Devices - Chameleon Run by Hyperbolic Magnetism
  - Nominated: Hackers, Redcon (video game) and Tiny Miners
- Best technological solution - American Truck Simulator by SCS Software
  - Nominated: Chameleon Run, Killing Room and Space Merchants: Arena
- Best audio - Samorost 3 by Amanita Design
  - Nominated: American Truck Simulator, Dark Train and The Solus Project
- Best Game Design - Chameleon Run by Hyperbolic Magnetism
  - Nominated: Dark Train, Samorost 3 and Trupki
- Best Story - 7 Mages by Napoleon Games
  - Nominated: Dark Train, Samorost 3 and The Solus Project
- Best Visual - Dark Train by Paperash Studio
  - Nominated: Chameleon Run, Samorost 3 and The Solus Project
- Biggest Hope - WarFriends by About Fun
  - Nominated: Blue Effect, Legends of Azulgar and Project ARGO
- Hall of Fame - František Fuka, Tomáš Rylek and Miroslav Fídler

== 2017 ==
The 2017 awards were presented on 23 May 2018. Educational game by Charles University Attentat 1942 has won 3 categories including the main award.

- Czech game of the year - Attentat 1942
  - Nominated: Skylar & Plux: Adventure on Clover Island, Smashing Four, WarFriends
- Czech game of the year for PC/Consoles - Attentat 1942
  - Nominated: Blue Effect, Skylar & Plux: Adventure on Clover Island, Take On Mars
- Czech game of the year for Mobile Devices - WarFriends
  - Nominated: AirportPRG, Smashing Four, What the Hen!
- Best technological solution - Shadowgun Legends
  - Nominated: Blue Effect, Mashinky, Ylands
- Best audio - Blue Effect
  - Nominated: Attentat 1942, Skylar & Plux: Adventure on Clover Island, Under Leaves
- Best Game Design - Mashinky
  - Nominated: AirportPRG, Smashing Four, Through the Ages
- Best Story - Attentat 1942
  - Nominated: Erin: The Last Aos Sí, Ghostory, The Naked Game
- Best Visual - Under Leaves
  - Nominated: Shadowgun Legends, Tragedy of Prince Rupert, Ylands
- Biggest Hope - Mashinky
  - Nominated: Children of the Galaxy, Shadowgun Legends, Ylands
- Hall of Fame - Martin Klíma

== 2018 ==
The 2018 awards were presented on 5 April 2019, hosted by Tomáš Hanák. Nominations were announced on 28 March 2019. Kingdom Come: Deliverance and Beat Saber received highest number of nominations. Kingdom Come: Deliverance was seen as a front runner and has won highest number of awards winning 3 categories - YouTubers Award, Best Game Design and Best Technological Solution but lost to Beat Saber in the main award category. Beat Saber also won Game Journalists Award. Chuchel won Best Game Design award.

- Developer's Award - Main Award: Beat Saber
  - Nominated: Chuchel, DayZ, Kingdom Come: Deliverance
- Game Journalists Award: Beat Saber
  - Nominated: Heroes of Flatlandia, Aggressors: Ancient Rome, Kingdom Come: Deliverance
- YouTubers Award: Kingdom Come: Deliverance
  - Nominated: Band of Defenders, Beat Saber, DayZ
- Audiovisual Execution: Chuchel
  - Nominated: Project Hospital, Beat Saber, Kingdom Come: Deliverance
- Best Game Design: Kingdom Come: Deliverance
  - Nominated: The Apartment, Beat Saber, DayZ
- Best technological solution: Kingdom Come: Deliverance
  - Nominated: Mothergunship, Frontier Pilot Simulator, Beat Saber
- Hall of Fame: Tomáš Smutný and Eduard Smutný

== 2019 ==
The 2019 awards were set for 20 March 2020, but were postponed due to the COVID-19 pandemic. A new date was announced on 13 July 2020, with the show scheduled to be held on 25 September 2020. Pilgrims by Amanita Design has eventually won the main award. Ylands by Bohemia Interactive won 2 awards - for Best technological solution and Best Free to Play game.

- Czech game of the Year - Main Award: Pilgrims
  - Nominated: Ylands, Vigor, Planet Nomads
- Audiovisual Execution: Feudal Alloy
  - Nominated: Little Mouse's Encyclopedia, Pilgrims, Zeminátor
- Best Game Design: Monolisk
  - Nominated: Ylands, Jim is Moving Out!, Time, Space and Matter
- Best technological solution: Ylands
  - Nominated: Vigor, Flippy Friends AR Multiplayer, Planet Nomads
- Free to Play: Ylands
  - Nominated: Ritual: Sorcerer Angel, Vigor, Idle Quest Heroes
- Student game: Silicomrades
- Hall of Fame: Andrej Anastasov

== 2020 ==
The 2020 awards were held on 8 December 2021. It was linked with a survey about best Czech game of the 2010s. Kingdom Come: Deliverance was voted best Czech video game of the 2010s. Creaks won the main award.

- Czech game of 2020: Creaks
- Best technological solution: Mafia: Definitive Edition
- Best Game Design: Someday You'll Return
- Audiovisual Execution: Creaks
- Free to Play: Shadowgun War Games
- Hall of Fame: Lukáš Ladra
- Czech game of the Decade: Kingdom Come: Deliverance

== 2021 ==
The 2021 awards were held on 6 December 2022. Svoboda 1945: Liberation by Charles Games won the main award.

- Czech game of 2021: Svoboda 1945: Liberation
- Best technological solution: Nebuchadnezzar
- Best Game Design: Hobo: Tough Life
- Audiovisual Execution: Happy Game
- Free to Play: Mini DayZ 2
- Hall of Fame: Marek Španěl
- Student Game: HATS!
- Best Community Support: Euro Truck Simulator 2

== 2022 and 2023 ==
The 2022 awards were originally to be held in 2023 but organisers didn't manage to secure sufficient support and funding for it. They eventually found enough partners and supporters so that next awards could be held in 2024. Organisers decided to hold dual awards for 2022 and 2023 and set it for 10 December 2024.

Nominated games of 2022 included Afterglitch, Dungeon: Faster & Deadlier, Sokochess, Boom Mania, Polda 7, Shy Eye Labyrinth: The Incredible Mystery, Fragments Of A Mind, The Last Oricru, Lords and Villeins, 1428: Shadows over Silesia, FixFox, Sokoboss, Light Bringer, Beyond the Wall and Leave No One Behind: Ia Drang and Codenames while nominated games for year 2023 included: Hrot, Bzzzt, Last Train Home, Crime Boss: Rockay City, Arma Reforger, Facteroids, Mycosis, FFF, Next Move, The Gray Man, Track Craft, Don't Leave, Ylands EDU and Crossroad OS.

2022 results

- Czech game of 2022: 1428: Shadows over Silesia
- Best Game Design of 2022: Codenames
- Audiovisual Execution of 2022: Afterglitch
- Choice of Player Community for the best Czech game of 2022: Polda 7

2023 results

- Czech game of 2023: Last Train Home
- Best Game Design of 2023: Hrot
- Audiovisual Execution of 2023: Bzzzt
- Choice of Player Community for the best Czech game of 2023: Last Train Home

Hall of Fame

- Hall of Fame: Jan Jirkovský

== 2024 and 2025 ==
Organizers announced during 2022/2023 awards that they decided to align the awards so that they always reflect the given year. Thus they immediately announced another dual year, which would honor not only 2024 games, but 2025 games. They have therefore immediately presented the nominated titles for 2024 year, which were at the time: Velvet 89 by Charles Games, Phantasos by Jan Švec, TopSpin 2K25 by Hangar 13, Farmageddon: Undead by Sagittarius Fox, Wings of Redemption by Nukeborn Studio, Whispers of Prague by Shader Mess, Shrot by Spytihněv, Solar Storm by Jakub Tomšů, Kubikon 3D by Kubi Games, Movies Tycoon by PixelCraze, Kvark by Latest Past/Perun Creative, Gods Against Machines by Silver Eye Studios, The Happies: Amber Falcon by Troglodyte Studio, Rats in a Cage by Superdeep Borehole, Blockstar VR by Immersive Division, Rail Route by Bitrich.info, Omnibullet by Arbitrary Combination. Date for 2024/2025 awards was scheduled for 21 January 2026 but ceremony didn't happen.

On 31 October 2026, it was announced that ceremony will happen on 10 December 2026. Nominated games included 57 titles for 2024 and 2025.

Nominees for 2024 include: Blockstar VR by Immersive Division, Boom Castle by Terahype, Coffee Caravan by Broccoli Games, Don't Puke by DIVR Labs, Farmageddon: Undead by Sagittarius Fox, Farming Simulator by Giants Software, Gods Against Machines by Silver Eye Studios, Going for Nuts by Crazy Mage, Kubikon 3D by Kubi Games, Kvark by Latest Past/Perun Creative, Movies Tycoon by PixelCraze, Omnibullet by Arbitrary Combination, Panelak by Pajos Games, Phantasos by Jan Švec, Pixel Boy 2 - The Castle Revenge by AppsGears, Rail Route by Bitrich.info, Rats in a Cage by Superdeep Borehole, Rose by Zakroutil, Shrot by Spytihněv, Solar Storm by Jan Tomšů, TELETEXT by div, The Happies: Amber Falcon by Troglodyte Studio, TopSpin 2K25 by Hangar 13, Trupki by Plug'n'Plug, Universe Has No Favorites by Radek Volf, Velvet 89 by Charles Games, Whispers of Prague: The Executioner's Last Cut by Shader Mess and Wings of Redemption by Nukeborn Studio, Za češtiny ve hrách! by Pařanský ráj. Nominees for 2025 include: Animal Simulator by Imperian Online - Core, Bajka by Hangonit, Barabizna by CepSoft, ExoColony: Planet Survival by Simplemole, Find Me by Ludmila Pislova, Hana Bauerova, Ghost In The Grid by Luc2as Games, GhostShot by Kryštof Karásek, Gnomer by Team Ruby, Hlína by Omnia Ludus, Chaos Caster by Lukáš Osouch, Kingdom Come: Deliverance II by Warhorse Studios, Kopi by Dream on a Stick Limited, Lithium by Blue Pulsar kolektiv, Luck and Loot by SMARTcreative, Mafia: The Old Country by Hangar 13, Machinicide by Gravity Shenanigans, Na vlně! by Czech Television, Panzerkampf by Krieg Games, Plot Twist by Sagittarius Fox, Polda 4 HD by Zima Software, Poslední Dopis by Matěj Vršan, Radiolight by Kryštof Knesl, Rocket Boots Mania by Luma Play, Silicomrades by Outside the Fox, Sokobos 2 by Martin Games, The Book of Aaru by Amenti Studio, Tribe Nation by Random Worlds and Zerun: The Tiny Planet by Mirakar Studio and CINEMAX GAMES.

2024 results

- Czech game of 2024:
- Best Game Design of 2024:
- Audiovisual Execution of 2024:

2025 results

- Czech game of 2025:
- Best Game Design of 2025:
- Audiovisual Execution of 2025:

Player Community Choice

- Player Community Choice:

Hall of Fame

- Hall of Fame:
