= 1428: Shadows over Silesia =

- Developer: KUBI Games
- Designer: Petr Kubíček
- Engine: Unity
- Platform: Microsoft Windows
- Release: 4 October 2022
- Genre: Action-adventure game
- Mode: Single player

1428: Shadows Over Silesia is a Dark fantasy Action-adventure game developed by KUBI Games set during Hussite Wars. It is the first Czech video game that is fully blind accessible.

== Plot ==
The game is set during the 1428 Hussite campaign in Silesia. The story is told through the eyes of Hussite Hauptmann Hynek and Knight Hospitaller Lothar. Tensions arise over whether they will remain enemies or join forces to face a bigger threat.

== Gameplay ==
1428: Shadows over Silesia progresses through 13 chapters during which the player takes the roles of hussite Hynek and Knight Lothar. The storyline is linear. Gameplay combines various genres including Adventure, Stealth game and Action with swordplay. Fights are tactical with emphasis on realism. The player has to defend himself during fights and time his strikes well to win. If the player is outnumbered he has to use advantageous position. The player has to often use stealth instead of facing enemies directly. Some parts focus on adventure aspects with the player gathering various objects to advance further (such as keys) and solving logical puzzles. The player also discovers various texts on the journey that expand the lore of the game. Some texts are written in cipher which the player has to solve in a logical Minigame. Another Minigame is Dice

== Development ==
1428: Shadows over Silesia was announced on 18 February 2020 after the project left pre-production phase. Due to lack of finances developers launched crowdfunding campaign through HitHit platform on 7 September 2021 asking for 500,000 CZK. Crowdfunding campaign successfully concluded on 7 October 2021. It had gathered 606,670 CZK. On 7 February 2022 demo was released while release date was set for late Summer 2022.

Developers announced on 21 March 2022 that the game will be fully blind accessible. Kubi Games worked with blind programmer Lukáš Hosnedl during development. The game features navigational sonar and recitation of written texts to allow blind players playing the game.

Release date was later set for 6 September 2022 but later delayed for 4 October 2022. The game was released on 4 October on Steam. Xzone released physical copy of the game.

=== DLC ===
Kubi Games released a DLC called the Tourney at the Bear Rock in the autumn of 2024. The DLC offers a new story set prior events of the original game. It is set on Castle Perštejn in 1409 when Hynek participates in a tournament competition while having to uncover a mystery. The new story features various new characters such as Jan Žižka, Jan Sokol of Lamberk or Vilém of Perštejn. Player can test their skills in tournament competition that includes disciplines mounted combat, man-to-man combat, and archery.

== Reception ==
At the 2022 Czech Game of the Year Awards, 1428: Shadows over Silesia won the Czech game of the year award.
