= List of Game of the Year awards =

Game of the Year (GotY) is an award given to a video game by various award events and media publications that they feel represented the pinnacle of gaming that year.

Of these award events, five are considered the most significant, those being the Golden Joysticks, the Game Awards, the D.I.C.E. Awards, the Game Developer Choice Awards, and the BAFTA Games Awards. Only two games have won all five in a given year: Baldur's Gate 3 in 2023 and Clair Obscur: Expedition 33 in 2025.

== Events and ceremonies ==
=== British Academy Games Awards (BAFTA Games Awards) ===
The British Academy Games Awards are an annual British awards ceremony honoring "outstanding creative achievement" in the video game industry. First presented in 2004 following the restructuring of the BAFTA Interactive Entertainment Awards, the awards are presented by the British Academy of Film and Television Arts (BAFTA), and are thus commonly referred to as the BAFTA Games Awards.

Year	Game	Genre	Developer(s)
1998	GoldenEye 007	First-person shooter	Rare
1999	The Legend of Zelda: Ocarina of Time	Action-adventure	Nintendo EAD
2000	Console: MediEvil 2	Action-adventure	SCE Studio Cambridge
2000	Handheld: Pokémon Yellow	Role-playing	Game Freak
2000	PC: Deus Ex	Action role-playing	Ion Storm
2001	Console: Gran Turismo 3: A-Spec	Racing	Polyphony Digital
2001	Handheld: Tony Hawk's Pro Skater 2	Sports	Vicarious Visions
2001	PC: Max Payne	Third-person shooter	Remedy Entertainment
2002	Console: Halo: Combat Evolved	First-person shooter	Bungie
2002	Handheld: SMS Chess		Purple Software
2002	PC: Neverwinter Nights	Role-playing	BioWare
2003	Call of Duty	First-person shooter	Infinity Ward
2004	Half-Life 2	First-person shooter	Valve
2006	Tom Clancy's Ghost Recon Advanced Warfighter	Tactical shooter	Ubisoft Paris
2007	BioShock	First-person shooter	Irrational Games
2008	Super Mario Galaxy	Platformer	Nintendo EAD
2009	Batman: Arkham Asylum	Action-adventure	Rocksteady Studios
2010	Mass Effect 2	Action role-playing	BioWare
2011	Portal 2	Puzzle-platformer	Valve
2012	Dishonored	Action-adventure	Arkane Studios
2013	The Last of Us	Action-adventure	Naughty Dog
2014	Destiny	Action role-playing	Bungie
2015	Fallout 4	Action role-playing	Bethesda Game Studios
2016	Uncharted 4: A Thief's End	Action-adventure	Naughty Dog
2017	What Remains of Edith Finch	Adventure	Giant Sparrow
2018	God of War	Action-adventure	Santa Monica Studio
2019	Outer Wilds	Action-adventure	Mobius Digital
2020	Hades	Action role-playing	Supergiant Games
2021	Returnal	Third-person shooter	Housemarque
2022	Vampire Survivors	Roguelike	Poncle
2023	Baldur's Gate 3	Role-playing	Larian Studios
2024	Astro Bot	Platformer	Team Asobi
2025	Clair Obscur: Expedition 33	Role-playing	Sandfall Interactive

=== Czech Game of the Year Awards ===
The Czech Game of the Year Awards were annual awards that recognize accomplishments in video game development. The awards have been dormant since 2021.

Year	Game	Genre	Developer(s)
2010	Mafia II	Action-adventure game	2K Czech
2011	Family Farm	Strategy video game	Hammerware
2012	Dead Trigger	First-person shooter	Madfinger Games
2012	Botanicula	Adventure	Amanita Design
2013	ArmA III	Tactical shooter	Bohemia Interactive
2013	Lums: The Game of Light and Shadows	Arcade game	Hyperbolic Magnetism
2014	Medieval Engineers	Sandbox	Keen Software House
2014	Dex	Action RPG Platformer	Dreadlocks Ltd
2014	Monzo	Simulation video game	Madfinger Games
2014	Coraabia	Online Card	ARK8
2015	Factorio	Real-time strategy	Wube Software
2015	Rememoried	Art Adventure	Vladimír Kudělka
2015	Czechoslovakia 1938–89: The Assassination	Educational	Charles University
2016	Samorost 3	Adventure	Amanita Design
2017	Attentat 1942	Adventure	Charles University
2018	Beat Saber	Rhythm	Beat Games
2019	Pilgrims	Graphic adventure	Amanita Design
2020	Creaks	Graphic adventure	Amanita Design
2021	Svoboda 1945: Liberation	Graphic adventure	Charles Games

=== D.I.C.E. Awards ===
The D.I.C.E. Awards are awarded by the Academy of Interactive Arts & Sciences (AIAS), a non-profit organization of industry professionals. The awards were previously known as the Interactive Achievement Awards until 2013.

Year	Game	Genre	Developer(s)
1997/1998	GoldenEye 007	First-person shooter	Rare
1998/1999	The Legend of Zelda: Ocarina of Time	Action-adventure	Nintendo EAD
1999/2000	The Sims	Life simulation	Maxis
2000	Diablo II	Action role-playing	Blizzard North
2001	Halo: Combat Evolved	First-person shooter	Bungie
2002	Battlefield 1942	First-person shooter	Digital Illusions CE
2003	Call of Duty	First-person shooter	Infinity Ward
2004	Half-Life 2	First-person shooter	Valve
2005	God of War	Action-adventure	Santa Monica Studio
2006	Gears of War	Third-person shooter	Epic Games
2007	Call of Duty 4: Modern Warfare	First-person shooter	Infinity Ward
2008	LittleBigPlanet	Puzzle-platformer	Media Molecule
2009	Uncharted 2: Among Thieves	Action-adventure	Naughty Dog
2010	Mass Effect 2	Action role-playing	BioWare
2011	The Elder Scrolls V: Skyrim	Action role-playing	Bethesda Game Studios
2012	Journey	Adventure	Thatgamecompany
2013	The Last of Us	Action-adventure	Naughty Dog
2014	Dragon Age: Inquisition	Action role-playing	BioWare
2015	Fallout 4	Action role-playing	Bethesda Game Studios
2016	Overwatch	First-person shooter	Blizzard Entertainment
2017	The Legend of Zelda: Breath of the Wild	Action-adventure	Nintendo EPD
2018	God of War	Action-adventure	Santa Monica Studio
2019	Untitled Goose Game	Puzzle–stealth	House House
2020	Hades	Action role-playing	Supergiant Games
2021	It Takes Two	Action-adventure	Hazelight Studios
2022	Elden Ring	Action role-playing	FromSoftware
2023	Baldur's Gate 3	Role-playing	Larian Studios
2024	Astro Bot	Platformer	Team Asobi
2025	Clair Obscur: Expedition 33	Role-playing	Sandfall Interactive

=== Electronic Gaming Awards (formerly Arcade Awards) ===
The Arcade Awards, also known as the Arkie Awards, was one of the first video game awards, dating back to the golden age of arcade video games and lasting up until the video game crash of 1983. It was held since 1980 (for games released in 1979 and earlier) and were announced annually by Electronic Games magazine since 1981, covering several platform categories. Following the magazine's revival in 1992, it published the Electronic Gaming Awards in January 1993 for the best video games released in 1992. The 1992 and 1993 award were voted on by readers.

Year	Arcade	Standalone	Console	Computer
1979	Space Invaders			
1980	Asteroids		Superman	
1981	Pac-Man		Asteroids	Star Raiders
1982	Tron	Galaxian	Demon Attack	David's Midnight Magic
1983	Pole Position	Q*bert	Under 16K: Ms. Pac-Man; Over 16K: Lady Bug	Lode Runner
1984	Star Wars	Zaxxon	Space Shuttle	Ultima III: Exodus
1992	Street Fighter II			
1993	Disney's Aladdin			

=== Famitsu Awards ===
The Grand Prize winners of the annual Famitsu Awards, voted by Famitsu magazine's readers. An annual award ceremony has been held since 2005. Prior to 2005, the results were published in the magazine's annual "Best Hit Game Awards" feature since early 1987 (for games released in 1986).

Year	Game	Genre	Developer(s)
1986	Dragon Quest	Role-playing	Chunsoft
1987	Dragon Quest II	Role-playing	Chunsoft
1988	Dragon Quest III	Role-playing	Chunsoft
1989	Final Fantasy II	Role-playing	Squaresoft
1990	Dragon Quest IV	Role-playing	Chunsoft
1991	Final Fantasy IV	Role-playing	Squaresoft
2004	Monster Hunter	Action role-playing	Capcom
2005	Resident Evil 4	Survival horror	Capcom
2005	Kingdom Hearts II	Action role-playing	Square Enix
2006	Final Fantasy XII	Role-playing	Square Enix
2006	Pokémon Diamond and Pearl	Role-playing	Game Freak
2007	Super Mario Galaxy	Platformer	Nintendo EAD
2007	Monster Hunter Portable 2nd	Action role-playing	Capcom
2008	Monster Hunter Portable 2nd G	Action role-playing	Capcom
2009	Dragon Quest IX	Role-playing	Level-5
2010	Monster Hunter Portable 3rd	Action role-playing	Capcom
2011	Monster Hunter Tri G	Action role-playing	Capcom
2012	Animal Crossing: New Leaf	Life simulation	Nintendo EAD
2013	Monster Hunter 4	Action role-playing	Capcom
2014	Yo-kai Watch 2	Role-playing	Level-5
2015	Splatoon	Third-person shooter	Nintendo EAD
2016	Pokémon Sun and Moon	Role-playing	Game Freak
2017	The Legend of Zelda: Breath of the Wild	Action-adventure	Nintendo EPD
2017	Dragon Quest XI	Role-playing	Square Enix
2018	Monster Hunter: World	Action role-playing	Capcom
2018	Super Smash Bros. Ultimate	Fighting	Bandai Namco Studios / Sora Ltd.
2019	Pokémon Sword and Shield	Role-playing	Game Freak
2020	Animal Crossing: New Horizons	Life simulation	Nintendo EPD
2021	Monster Hunter Rise	Action role-playing	Capcom
2022	Elden Ring	Action role-playing	FromSoftware
2023	The Legend of Zelda: Tears of the Kingdom	Action-adventure	Nintendo EPD
2024	Final Fantasy VII Rebirth	Action role-playing	Square Enix Creative Business Unit I
2025	Silent Hill f	Survival horror	NeoBards Entertainment

=== The Game Awards ===
Geoff Keighley, producer and host of the Spike Video Game Awards, created The Game Awards in 2014. The winners are determined by a blended vote between the voting jury (90%) and public fan voting (10%); the jury panel consists of members from around 100 global media outlets.

Year	Game	Genre	Developer(s)
2014	Dragon Age: Inquisition	Action role-playing	BioWare
2015	The Witcher 3: Wild Hunt	Action role-playing	CD Projekt Red
2016	Overwatch	First-person shooter	Blizzard Entertainment
2017	The Legend of Zelda: Breath of the Wild	Action-adventure	Nintendo EPD
2018	God of War	Action-adventure	Santa Monica Studio
2019	Sekiro: Shadows Die Twice	Action-adventure	FromSoftware
2020	The Last of Us Part II	Action-adventure	Naughty Dog
2021	It Takes Two	Action-adventure	Hazelight Studios
2022	Elden Ring	Action role-playing	FromSoftware
2023	Baldur's Gate 3	Role-playing	Larian Studios
2024	Astro Bot	Platformer	Team Asobi
2025	Clair Obscur: Expedition 33	Role-playing	Sandfall Interactive

=== Game Developers Choice Awards ===
The Game Developers Choice Award for Game of the Year is announced during the Game Developers Choice Awards at the Game Developers Conference (GDC), the largest annual gathering of professional video game developers.

Year	Game	Genre	Developer(s)
2000	The Sims	Life simulation	Maxis
2001	Grand Theft Auto III	Action-adventure	DMA Design
2002	Metroid Prime	Action-adventure	Retro Studios
2003	Star Wars: Knights of the Old Republic	Role-playing	BioWare
2004	Half-Life 2	First-person shooter	Valve
2005	Shadow of the Colossus	Action-adventure	Japan Studio, Team Ico
2006	Gears of War	Third-person shooter	Epic Games
2007	Portal	Puzzle-platformer	Valve
2008	Fallout 3	Action role-playing	Bethesda Game Studios
2009	Uncharted 2: Among Thieves	Action-adventure	Naughty Dog
2010	Red Dead Redemption	Action-adventure	Rockstar San Diego
2011	The Elder Scrolls V: Skyrim	Action role-playing	Bethesda Game Studios
2012	Journey	Adventure	Thatgamecompany
2013	The Last of Us	Action-adventure	Naughty Dog
2014	Middle-earth: Shadow of Mordor	Action-adventure	Monolith Productions
2015	The Witcher 3: Wild Hunt	Action role-playing	CD Projekt Red
2016	Overwatch	First-person shooter	Blizzard Entertainment
2017	The Legend of Zelda: Breath of the Wild	Action-adventure	Nintendo EPD
2018	God of War	Action-adventure	Santa Monica Studio
2019	Untitled Goose Game	Puzzle–stealth	House House
2020	Hades	Action role-playing	Supergiant Games
2021	Inscryption	Roguelike deck-building	Daniel Mullins Games
2022	Elden Ring	Action role-playing	FromSoftware
2023	Baldur's Gate 3	Role-playing	Larian Studios
2024	Balatro	Roguelike deck-building	LocalThunk
2025	Clair Obscur: Expedition 33	Role-playing	Sandfall Interactive

=== Golden Joystick Awards ===
The Golden Joystick Awards is the second oldest gaming award ceremony and is the longest-running video game award. The inaugural ceremony took place in 1984 in London's Berkeley Square.

Year	Game	Genre	Developer(s)
1983	Jetpac	Shooter	Ultimate
1984	Knight Lore	Action-adventure	Ultimate
1985	Way of the Exploding Fist	Fighting	Beam Software
1986	Gauntlet	Hack-and-slash	Atari Games
1987	Out Run	Racing	Sega
1988	8-bit computers: Operation Wolf	Light gun shooter	Taito
1988	16-bit computers: Speedball	Sports	Bitmap Brothers
1988	Consoles: Thunder Blade	Combat flight simulator	Sega
1989	8-bit computers: The Untouchables	Shooter	Ocean Software
1989	16-bit computers: Kick Off	Sports	Dino Dini
1990	8-bit computers: Rick Dangerous 2	Platformer	Core Design
1990	16-bit computers: Kick Off 2	Sports	Dino Dini
1990	8-bit consoles: Mega Man	Platformer	Capcom
1990	16-bit consoles: John Madden Football	Sports (American football)	Park Place Productions
1991	Sonic the Hedgehog	Platformer	Sega
1992	Street Fighter II	Fighting	Capcom
1994	Consoles: Super Mario All-Stars	Platformer	Nintendo EAD
1994	Handhelds: The Legend of Zelda: Link's Awakening	Action-Adventure	Nintendo EAD
1996/1997	Super Mario 64	Platformer	Nintendo EAD
2002	Grand Theft Auto III	Action-adventure	DMA Design
2003	Grand Theft Auto: Vice City	Action-adventure	Rockstar North
2004	Doom 3	First-person shooter	id Software
2005	Grand Theft Auto: San Andreas	Action-adventure	Rockstar North
2006	The Elder Scrolls IV: Oblivion	Action role-playing	Bethesda Game Studios
2007	Gears of War	Third-person shooter	Epic Games
2008	Call of Duty 4: Modern Warfare	First-person shooter	Infinity Ward
2009	Fallout 3	Action role-playing	Bethesda Game Studios
2010	Mass Effect 2	Action role-playing	BioWare
2011	Portal 2	Puzzle-platformer	Valve
2012	The Elder Scrolls V: Skyrim	Action role-playing	Bethesda Game Studios
2013	Grand Theft Auto V	Action-adventure	Rockstar North
2014	Dark Souls II	Action role-playing	FromSoftware
2015	The Witcher 3: Wild Hunt	Action role-playing	CD Projekt Red
2016	Dark Souls III	Action role-playing	FromSoftware
2017	The Legend of Zelda: Breath of the Wild	Action-adventure	Nintendo EPD
2018	Fortnite Battle Royale	Battle royale	Epic Games
2019	Resident Evil 2	Survival horror	Capcom
2020	The Last of Us Part II	Action-adventure	Naughty Dog
2021	Resident Evil Village	Survival horror	Capcom
2022	Elden Ring	Action role-playing	FromSoftware
2023	Baldur's Gate 3	Role-playing	Larian Studios
2024	Black Myth: Wukong	Action-adventure	Game Science
2025	Clair Obscur: Expedition 33	Role-playing	Sandfall Interactive
2026	Resident Evil Requiem	Survival horror	Capcom

=== Japan Game Awards (formerly CESA Awards) ===
The winners of the Grand Award annually given by the Japan Game Awards, formerly known as the CESA Awards, since 1996. There are some years where two games shared the Grand Award.

Year	Game	Genre	Developer(s)
1996	Sakura Wars	Tactical role-playing	Overworks
1997	Final Fantasy VII	Role-playing	Square
1998	The Legend of Zelda: Ocarina of Time	Action-adventure	Nintendo EAD
1999	Doko Demo Issyo	Strategy	Sony Computer Entertainment
1999	Final Fantasy VIII	Role-playing	Square
2000	Phantasy Star Online	Action role-playing	Sonic Team
2001/2	Final Fantasy X	Role-playing	Square
2003	Final Fantasy XI	MMORPG	Square
2003	Taiko no Tatsujin	Rhythm	Namco
2004	Monster Hunter	Action role-playing	Capcom
2005	Dragon Quest VIII	Role-playing	Level-5
2006	Final Fantasy XII	Role-playing	Square Enix
2006	Dr. Kawashima's Brain Training	Puzzle	Nintendo SDD
2007	Wii Sports	Sports	Nintendo EAD
2007	Monster Hunter Portable 2nd	Action role-playing	Capcom
2008	Wii Fit	Fitness	Nintendo EAD
2008	Monster Hunter Portable 2nd G	Action role-playing	Capcom
2009	Metal Gear Solid 4: Guns of the Patriots	Action-adventure	Kojima Productions
2009	Mario Kart Wii	Racing	Nintendo EAD
2010	New Super Mario Bros. Wii	Platformer	Nintendo EAD
2011	Monster Hunter Portable 3rd	Action role-playing	Capcom
2012	Gravity Rush	Action-adventure	Project Siren
2012	JoJo's Bizarre Adventure: All Star Battle	Fighting	CyberConnect2
2013	Animal Crossing: New Leaf	Social simulation	Nintendo EAD
2014	Monster Hunter 4	Action role-playing	Capcom
2014	Yo-kai Watch	Role-playing	Level-5
2015	Yo-kai Watch 2	Role-playing	Level-5
2016	Splatoon	Third-person shooter	Nintendo EAD
2017	The Legend of Zelda: Breath of the Wild	Action-adventure	Nintendo EPD
2018	Monster Hunter: World	Action role-playing	Capcom
2019	Super Smash Bros. Ultimate	Fighting	Bandai Namco Studios, Sora Ltd.
2020	Animal Crossing: New Horizons	Social simulation	Nintendo EPD
2021	Ghost of Tsushima	Action-adventure	Sucker Punch Productions
2021	Monster Hunter Rise	Action role-playing	Capcom
2022	Elden Ring	Action role-playing	FromSoftware
2023	Monster Hunter Rise: Sunbreak	Action role-playing	Capcom
2024	The Legend of Zelda: Tears of the Kingdom	Action role-playing	Nintendo EPD
2025	Metaphor: ReFantazio	Role-playing	Atlus
2026	Pokémon Pokopia	Social simulation	Game Freak, Koei Tecmo (Omega Force)

=== New York Game Awards ===
The New York Videogame Critics Circle hosts an annual award show that recognizes the best contributions to the video game industry from the previous year.

Year	Game	Genre	Developer(s)
2011	The Elder Scrolls V: Skyrim	Action role-playing	Bethesda Game Studios
2012	The Walking Dead	Graphic adventure	Telltale Games
2013	The Last of Us	Action-adventure	Naughty Dog
2014	Wolfenstein: The New Order	First-person shooter	MachineGames
2015	The Witcher 3: Wild Hunt	Action role-playing	CD Projekt Red
2016	Uncharted 4: A Thief's End	Action-adventure	Naughty Dog
2017	The Legend of Zelda: Breath of the Wild	Action-adventure	Nintendo EPD
2018	God of War	Action-adventure	Santa Monica Studio
2019	The Outer Worlds	Action role-playing	Obsidian Entertainment
2020	Hades	Action role-playing	Supergiant Games
2021	Psychonauts 2	Platformer	Double Fine
2022	Elden Ring	Action role-playing	FromSoftware
2023	Baldur's Gate 3	Role-playing	Larian Studios
2024	Astro Bot	Platformer	Team Asobi
2025	Clair Obscur: Expedition 33	Role-playing	Sandfall Interactive

=== Spike Video Game Awards ===
The winners of the Spike Video Game Awards, hosted by Spike between 2003 and 2013, awarded the Game of the Year using an advisory council featuring over 20 journalists from media outlets. The show's title was changed to VGX in 2013 before Spike TV dropped the show entirely. Host and producer Geoff Keighley created The Game Awards in 2014.

Year	Game	Genre	Developer(s)
2003	Madden NFL 2004	Sports	EA Tiburon
2004	Grand Theft Auto: San Andreas	Action-adventure	Rockstar North
2005	Resident Evil 4	Survival horror	Capcom
2006	The Elder Scrolls IV: Oblivion	Action role-playing	Bethesda Game Studios
2007	BioShock	First-person shooter	Irrational Games
2008	Grand Theft Auto IV	Action-adventure	Rockstar North
2009	Uncharted 2: Among Thieves	Action-adventure	Naughty Dog
2010	Red Dead Redemption	Action-adventure	Rockstar San Diego
2011	The Elder Scrolls V: Skyrim	Action role-playing	Bethesda Game Studios
2012	The Walking Dead	Graphic adventure	Telltale Games
2013	Grand Theft Auto V	Action-adventure	Rockstar North

=== SXSW Gaming Awards ===
The winners of the SXSW Gaming Awards were judged by the SXSW Gaming Advisory Board, which is composed of over 40 industry members. South by Southwest announced in 2023 that the awards would be discontinued.

Year	Game	Genre	Developer(s)
2013	The Last of Us	Action-adventure	Naughty Dog
2014	Dragon Age: Inquisition	Action role-playing	BioWare
2015	The Witcher 3: Wild Hunt	Action role-playing	CD Projekt Red
2016	Uncharted 4: A Thief's End	Action-adventure	Naughty Dog
2017	The Legend of Zelda: Breath of the Wild	Action-adventure	Nintendo EPD
2018	God of War	Action-adventure	Santa Monica Studio
2019	Sekiro: Shadows Die Twice	Action-adventure	FromSoftware
2020	Hades	Action role-playing	Supergiant Games
2021	Final Fantasy XIV: Endwalker	MMORPG	Square Enix

=== VSDA Awards ===
The Video Software Dealers Association's VSDA Awards for home entertainment handed out awards for the best video games of the year until 2001.

Year	Game	Genre	Developer(s)
1982	Pac-Man	Maze	Namco
1993	NBA Jam	Sports	Midway Games
1994	Donkey Kong Country	Platformer	Rare
1995	Donkey Kong Country 2: Diddy's Kong Quest	Platformer	Rare
1997	GoldenEye 007	First-person shooter	Rare
1998	The Legend of Zelda: Ocarina of Time	Action-adventure	Nintendo EAD
1999	Pokémon Stadium	Strategy	Nintendo EAD
2000	Tony Hawk's Pro Skater 2	Sports	Neversoft

== Publications and media ==
=== Ars Technica ===
Year	Game	Genre	Developer(s)
2012	Dishonored	Action-adventure	Arkane Studios
2013	Papers, Please	Puzzle	3909 LLC
2014	Dragon Age: Inquisition	Action role-playing	BioWare
2015	Rocket League	Sports	Psyonix
2016	Overwatch	First-person shooter	Blizzard Entertainment
2017	Super Mario Odyssey	Platformer	Nintendo EPD
2018	Celeste	Platformer	Maddy Makes Games
2019	Control	Action-adventure	Remedy Entertainment
2020	Hades	Action role-playing	Supergiant Games
2021	Psychonauts 2	Platform	Double Fine
2022	Elden Ring	Action role-playing	FromSoftware
2023	Baldur's Gate 3	Role-playing	Larian Studios

=== Destructoid ===
Year	Game	Genre	Developer(s)
2007	BioShock	First-person shooter	Irrational Games
2008	Left 4 Dead	First-person shooter	Valve
2009	Uncharted 2: Among Thieves	Action-adventure	Naughty Dog
2010	Super Mario Galaxy 2	Platform	Nintendo EAD
2011	Portal 2	Puzzle-platform	Valve
2012	The Walking Dead	Graphic adventure	Telltale Games
2013	The Last of Us	Action-adventure	Naughty Dog
2014	Bayonetta 2	Hack 'n' slash	PlatinumGames
2015	Bloodborne	Action role-playing	FromSoftware
2016	Overwatch	First-person shooter	Blizzard Entertainment
2017	The Legend of Zelda: Breath of the Wild	Action-adventure	Nintendo EPD
2018	God of War	Action-adventure	Santa Monica Studio
2019	The Outer Worlds	Action role-playing	Obsidian Entertainment
2020	Hades	Action role-playing	Supergiant Games
2021	Chicory: A Colorful Tale	Adventure	Greg Lobanov
2022	Elden Ring	Action role-playing	FromSoftware
2023	The Legend of Zelda: Tears of the Kingdom	Action-adventure	Nintendo EPD
2024	Astro Bot	Platformer	Team Asobi
2025	Clair Obscur: Expedition 33	Role-playing	Sandfall Interactive

=== Easy Allies ===
Year	Game	Genre	Developer(s)
2016	The Last Guardian	Action-adventure	Japan Studio
2017	The Legend of Zelda: Breath of the Wild	Action-adventure	Nintendo EPD
2018	God of War	Action-adventure	Santa Monica Studio
2019	Sekiro: Shadows Die Twice	Action-adventure	FromSoftware
2020	Half-Life: Alyx	First-person shooter	Valve
2021	Returnal	Third-person shooter	Housemarque
2022	Elden Ring	Action role-playing	FromSoftware
2023	Resident Evil 4	Survival horror	Capcom
2024	Balatro	Roguelike deck-building	LocalThunk
2025	Blue Prince	Puzzle-adventure	Dogubomb

=== Edge ===
Year	Game	Genre	Developer(s)
1998	The Legend of Zelda: Ocarina of Time	Action-adventure	Nintendo EAD
1999	Gran Turismo 2	Racing simulation	Polyphony Digital
2002	Metroid Prime	Action-adventure	Retro Studios
2004	Half-Life 2	First-person shooter	Valve
2005	Resident Evil 4	Survival horror	Capcom
2006	Final Fantasy XII	Role-playing	Square Enix
2007	Super Mario Galaxy	Platformer	Nintendo EAD
2008	Grand Theft Auto IV	Action-adventure	Rockstar North
2009	Borderlands	Action role-playing	Gearbox Software
2010	Super Mario Galaxy 2	Platformer	Nintendo EAD
2011	The Legend of Zelda: Skyward Sword	Action-adventure	Nintendo EAD
2012	Dishonored	Action-adventure	Arkane Studios
2013	Grand Theft Auto V	Action-adventure	Rockstar North
2014	Bayonetta 2	Action	PlatinumGames
2015	Bloodborne	Action role-playing	FromSoftware
2016	The Last Guardian	Action-adventure	Japan Studio
2017	The Legend of Zelda: Breath of the Wild	Action-adventure	Nintendo EPD
2018	Red Dead Redemption 2	Action-adventure	Rockstar Games
2019	Outer Wilds	Action-adventure	Mobius Digital
2020	No direct GOTY award was given		
2021	Deathloop	First-person shooter	Arkane Studios
2022	Elden Ring	Action role-playing	FromSoftware
2022	Immortality	Interactive film	Sam Barlow
2023	The Legend of Zelda: Tears of the Kingdom	Action-adventure	Nintendo EPD
2024	Astro Bot	Platformer	Team Asobi
2025	Clair Obscur: Expedition 33	Role-playing	Sandfall Interactive

=== Electronic Gaming Monthly (EGM) ===
Year	Game	Genre	Developer(s)
1988	Double Dragon	Beat 'em up	Technōs Japan
1989	Ghouls 'n Ghosts	Platform	Capcom
1990	Strider	Platform	Capcom
1991	Sonic the Hedgehog	Platformer	Sonic Team
1992	Street Fighter II	Fighting	Capcom
1993	Samurai Shodown	Fighting	SNK
1994	Donkey Kong Country	Platformer	Rare
1995	Twisted Metal	Vehicular combat	SingleTrac
1996	Super Mario 64	Platformer	Nintendo EAD
1997	GoldenEye 007	First-person shooter	Rare
1998	The Legend of Zelda: Ocarina of Time	Action-adventure	Nintendo EAD
1999	Soulcalibur	Fighting	Namco
2000	Tony Hawk's Pro Skater 2	Sports	Neversoft
2001	Halo: Combat Evolved	First-person shooter	Bungie
2002	Metroid Prime	Action-adventure	Retro Studios
2003	Prince of Persia: The Sands of Time	Action-adventure	Ubisoft Montreal
2004	Halo 2	First-person shooter	Bungie
2005	Resident Evil 4	Survival horror	Capcom
2006	The Legend of Zelda: Twilight Princess	Action-adventure	Nintendo EAD
2007	BioShock	First-person shooter	Irrational Games
2008	Grand Theft Auto IV	Action-adventure	Rockstar North
2009	Uncharted 2: Among Thieves	Action-adventure	Naughty Dog
2010	Red Dead Redemption	Action-adventure	Rockstar San Diego
2011	The Elder Scrolls V: Skyrim	Action role-playing	Bethesda Game Studios
2012	Far Cry 3	First-person shooter	Ubisoft Montreal
2013	BioShock Infinite	First-person shooter	Irrational Games
2014	Dragon Age: Inquisition	Action role-playing	BioWare
2015	The Witcher 3: Wild Hunt	Action role-playing	CD Projekt Red
2016	Overwatch	First-person shooter	Blizzard Entertainment
2017	The Legend of Zelda: Breath of the Wild	Action-adventure	Nintendo EPD
2018	Red Dead Redemption 2	Action-adventure	Rockstar Games
2019	Control	Action-adventure	Remedy Entertainment
2020	The Last of Us Part II	Action-adventure	Naughty Dog
2021	Psychonauts 2	Platform	Double Fine
2022	Elden Ring	Action role-playing	FromSoftware

=== Empire ===
Year	Game	Genre	Developer(s)
2014	Dark Souls II	Action role-playing	FromSoftware
2015	Bloodborne	Action role-playing	FromSoftware
2016	Uncharted 4: A Thief's End	Action-adventure	Naughty Dog
2017	Super Mario Odyssey	Platform	Nintendo EAD
2018	God of War	Action-adventure	Santa Monica Studio
2019	Resident Evil 2	Action-adventure	Capcom
2020	The Last of Us Part II	Action-adventure	Naughty Dog
2021	Deathloop	First-person shooter	Arkane Studios
2022	Elden Ring	Action role-playing	FromSoftware
2023	Baldur's Gate 3	Role-playing	Larian Studios
2024	Astro Bot	Platformer	Team Asobi
2025	Clair Obscur: Expedition 33	Role-playing	Sandfall Interactive

=== Entertainment Weekly ===
Year	Game	Genre	Developer(s)
2007	BioShock	First-person shooter	Irrational Games
2008	Wii Fit	Fitness game	Nintendo EAD
2010	Red Dead Redemption	Action-adventure	Rockstar San Diego
2012	Journey	Adventure	Thatgamecompany
2013	BioShock Infinite	First-person shooter	Irrational Games
2015	Metal Gear Solid V: The Phantom Pain	Action-adventure	Kojima Productions
2016	Inside	Puzzle-platformer	Playdead
2017	The Legend of Zelda: Breath of the Wild	Action-adventure	Nintendo EPD
2018	God of War	Action-adventure	Santa Monica Studio
2019	Resident Evil 2	Survival horror	Capcom
2020	The Last of Us Part II	Action-adventure	Naughty Dog
2021	Resident Evil Village	Survival horror	Capcom

=== Eurogamer ===
Year	Game	Genre	Developer(s)
1999	Unreal Tournament	First-person shooter	Epic Games
2000	Deus Ex	Action role-playing	Ion Storm
2001	Grand Theft Auto III	Action-adventure	DMA Design
2002	Ico	Action-adventure	Team Ico
2003	Grand Theft Auto: Vice City	Action-adventure	Rockstar North
2004	Half-Life 2	First-person shooter	Valve
2005	Psychonauts	Platformer	Double Fine Productions
2006	Guitar Hero	Rhythm	Harmonix
2007	Portal	Puzzle-platformer	Valve
2008	LittleBigPlanet	Puzzle-platformer	Media Molecule
2009	Uncharted 2: Among Thieves	Action-adventure	Naughty Dog
2010	Mass Effect 2	Action role-playing	BioWare
2011	Portal 2	Puzzle-platformer	Valve
2012	Fez	Puzzle-platformer	Polytron Corporation
2013	Super Mario 3D World	Platformer	Nintendo EAD
2014	Mario Kart 8	Racing	Nintendo EAD
2015	Bloodborne	Action role-playing	FromSoftware
2016	Overwatch	First-person shooter	Blizzard Entertainment
2017	The Legend of Zelda: Breath of the Wild	Action-adventure	Nintendo EPD
2018	Tetris Effect	Puzzle	Monstars Inc. and Resonair
2019	Outer Wilds	Action-adventure	Mobius Digital
2020	Hades	Action role-playing	Supergiant Games
2021	Unpacking	Puzzle	Witch Beam
2022	Elden Ring	Action role-playing	FromSoftware
2023	Cocoon	Puzzle	Geometric Interactive
2024	Indiana Jones and the Great Circle	Action-adventure	MachineGames
2025	Blue Prince	Puzzle-adventure	Dogubomb

=== Game Informer ===
During their earlier years of publication they would give awards for the best game on each console available at the time, occasionally giving an award to the overall best game of the year. In 2017, they retroactively awarded a GOTY award for each past year that did not have an overall best game.

Year	Game	Genre	Developer(s)
1992	Street Fighter II	Fighting	Capcom
1993	Mortal Kombat	Fighting	Midway Games
1994	Donkey Kong Country	Platformer	Rare
1995	Donkey Kong Country 2: Diddy's Kong Quest	Platformer	Rare
1996	Super Mario 64	Platformer	Nintendo EAD
1997	Final Fantasy VII	Role-playing	Square
1998	The Legend of Zelda: Ocarina of Time	Action-adventure	Nintendo EAD
1999	Tony Hawk's Pro Skater	Sports	Neversoft
2000	Tony Hawk's Pro Skater 2	Sports	Neversoft
2001	Metal Gear Solid 2: Sons of Liberty	Action-adventure	Konami Computer Entertainment Japan
2002	Grand Theft Auto: Vice City	Action-adventure	Rockstar North
2003	The Legend of Zelda: The Wind Waker	Action-adventure	Nintendo EAD
2004	Halo 2	First-person shooter	Bungie
2005	Resident Evil 4	Survival horror	Capcom
2006	The Legend of Zelda: Twilight Princess	Action-adventure	Nintendo EAD
2007	BioShock	First-person shooter	Irrational Games
2008	Grand Theft Auto IV	Action-adventure	Rockstar North
2009	Uncharted 2: Among Thieves	Action-adventure	Naughty Dog
2010	Red Dead Redemption	Action-adventure	Rockstar San Diego
2011	The Elder Scrolls V: Skyrim	Action role-playing	Bethesda Game Studios
2012	Mass Effect 3	Action role-playing	BioWare
2013	The Last of Us	Action-adventure	Naughty Dog
2014	Dragon Age: Inquisition	Action role-playing	BioWare
2015	The Witcher 3: Wild Hunt	Action role-playing	CD Projekt Red
2016	Overwatch	First-person shooter	Blizzard Entertainment
2017	The Legend of Zelda: Breath of the Wild	Action-adventure	Nintendo EPD
2018	God of War	Action-adventure	Santa Monica Studio
2019	Control	Action-adventure	Remedy Entertainment
2020	The Last of Us Part II	Action-adventure	Naughty Dog
2021	Halo Infinite	First-person shooter	343 Industries
2022	Elden Ring	Action role-playing	FromSoftware
2023	The Legend of Zelda: Tears of the Kingdom	Action-adventure	Nintendo EPD
2024	Astro Bot	Platformer	Team Asobi
2025	Clair Obscur: Expedition 33	Role-playing	Sandfall Interactive

=== GameSpot ===
Year	Game	Genre	Developer(s)
1996	Diablo	Action role-playing	Blizzard North
1997	Total Annihilation	Real-time strategy	Cavedog Entertainment
1998	Console: The Legend of Zelda: Ocarina of Time	Action-adventure	Nintendo EAD
1998	PC: Grim Fandango	Graphic adventure	LucasArts
1999	Console: Soulcalibur	Fighting	Namco
1999	PC: EverQuest	MMORPG	Sony Online Entertainment
2000	Console: Chrono Cross	Role-playing	Square
2000	PC: The Sims	Life simulation	Maxis
2001	Console: Grand Theft Auto III	Action-adventure	DMA Design
2001	PC: Serious Sam: The First Encounter	First-person shooter	Croteam
2002	Metroid Prime	Action-adventure	Retro Studios
2003	The Legend of Zelda: The Wind Waker	Action-adventure	Nintendo EAD
2004	World of Warcraft	MMORPG	Blizzard Entertainment
2005	Resident Evil 4	Survival horror	Capcom
2006	Gears of War	Third-person shooter	Epic Games
2007	Super Mario Galaxy	Platformer	Nintendo EAD
2008	Metal Gear Solid 4: Guns of the Patriots	Action-adventure	Kojima Productions
2009	Demon's Souls	Action role-playing	FromSoftware
2010	Red Dead Redemption	Action-adventure	Rockstar San Diego
2011	The Elder Scrolls V: Skyrim	Action role-playing	Bethesda Game Studios
2012	Journey	Adventure	Thatgamecompany
2013	The Legend of Zelda: A Link Between Worlds	Action-adventure	Nintendo EAD
2014	Middle-earth: Shadow of Mordor	Action-adventure	Monolith Productions
2015	The Witcher 3: Wild Hunt	Action role-playing	CD Projekt Red
2016	Overwatch	First-person shooter	Blizzard Entertainment
2017	The Legend of Zelda: Breath of the Wild	Action-adventure	Nintendo EPD
2018	Red Dead Redemption 2	Action-adventure	Rockstar Games
2019	Sekiro: Shadows Die Twice	Action-adventure	FromSoftware
2020	Half-Life: Alyx	First-person shooter	Valve
2021	Deathloop	First-person shooter	Arkane Studios
2022	Elden Ring	Action role-playing	FromSoftware
2023	Baldur's Gate 3	Role-playing	Larian Studios
2024	Metaphor: ReFantazio	Role-playing	Atlus
2025	Clair Obscur: Expedition 33	Role-playing	Sandfall Interactive

=== GameSpy ===
Year	Game	Genre	Developer(s)
1999	Unreal Tournament	First-person shooter	Epic Games
2000	Deus Ex	Action role-playing	Ion Storm
2001	Grand Theft Auto III	Action-adventure	DMA Design
2002	Metroid Prime	Action-adventure	Retro Studios
2003	Star Wars: Knights of the Old Republic	Role-playing	BioWare
2004	Halo 2	First-person shooter	Bungie
2005	Civilization IV	Turn-based strategy	Firaxis Games
2006	The Legend of Zelda: Twilight Princess	Action-adventure	Nintendo EAD
2007	Call of Duty 4: Modern Warfare	First-person shooter	Infinity Ward
2008	Fallout 3	Action role-playing	Bethesda Game Studios
2009	Call of Duty: Modern Warfare 2	First-person shooter	Infinity Ward
2010	Red Dead Redemption	Action-adventure	Rockstar San Diego
2011	The Elder Scrolls V: Skyrim	Action role-playing	Bethesda Game Studios
2012	XCOM: Enemy Unknown	Turn-based tactics	Firaxis Games

=== GamesRadar+ ===
Year	Game	Genre	Developer(s)
2006	The Legend of Zelda: Twilight Princess	Action-adventure	Nintendo EAD
2007	The Orange Box	First-person shooter	Valve
2008	Fallout 3	Action role-playing	Bethesda Game Studios
2009	Batman: Arkham Asylum	Action-adventure	Rocksteady Studios
2010	Red Dead Redemption	Action-adventure	Rockstar San Diego
2011	Portal 2	Puzzle-platformer	Valve
2012	The Walking Dead	Graphic adventure	Telltale Games
2013	The Last of Us	Action-adventure	Naughty Dog
2014	Destiny	Action role-playing	Bungie
2015	Metal Gear Solid V: The Phantom Pain	Action-adventure	Kojima Productions
2016	Titanfall 2	First-person shooter	Respawn Entertainment
2017	The Legend of Zelda: Breath of the Wild	Action-adventure	Nintendo EPD
2018	God of War	Action-adventure	Santa Monica Studio
2019	Control	Action-adventure	Remedy Entertainment
2020	Hades	Action role-playing	Supergiant Games
2021	Deathloop	Action-adventure	Arkane Studios
2022	Elden Ring	Action role-playing	FromSoftware
2023	Baldur's Gate 3	Role-playing	Larian Studios
2024	Helldivers 2	Third-person shooter	Arrowhead Game Studios
2025	Clair Obscur: Expedition 33	Role-playing	Sandfall Interactive

=== Gamest ===
Year	Title	Genre	Developer	Ref
1987	Darius	Scrolling shooter	Taito	
1988	Gradius II	Scrolling shooter	Konami	
1989	Tetris	Puzzle	Sega	
1990	Final Fight	Beat 'em up	Capcom	
1991	Street Fighter II: The World Warrior	Fighting	Capcom	
1992	Street Fighter II Dash (Champion Edition)	Fighting	Capcom	
1993	Samurai Shodown	Fighting	SNK	
1994	The King of Fighters '94	Fighting	SNK	
1995	Virtua Fighter 2	Fighting	Sega AM2	
1996	Street Fighter Zero 2 (Street Fighter Alpha 2)	Fighting	Capcom	
1997	Vampire Savior (Darkstalkers 3)	Fighting	Capcom	
1998	Psychic Force 2012	Fighting	Taito	

=== GameTrailers ===
Year	Game	Genre	Developer(s)
2005	Resident Evil 4	Survival horror	Capcom
2006	The Legend of Zelda: Twilight Princess	Action-adventure	Nintendo EAD
2007	Super Mario Galaxy	Platformer	Nintendo EAD
2008	Grand Theft Auto IV	Action-adventure	Rockstar North
2009	Call of Duty: Modern Warfare 2	First-person shooter	Infinity Ward
2010	Mass Effect 2	Action role-playing	BioWare
2011	Uncharted 3: Drake's Deception	Action-adventure	Naughty Dog
2012	XCOM: Enemy Unknown	Turn-based tactics	Firaxis Games
2013	The Last of Us	Action-adventure	Naughty Dog
2014	Hearthstone	Card game	Blizzard Entertainment
2015	Bloodborne	Action role-playing	FromSoftware

=== Giant Bomb ===
Year	Game	Genre	Developer(s)
2008	Grand Theft Auto IV	Action-adventure	Rockstar North
2009	Uncharted 2: Among Thieves	Action-adventure	Naughty Dog
2010	Mass Effect 2	Action role-playing	BioWare
2011	The Elder Scrolls V: Skyrim	Action role-playing	Bethesda Game Studios
2012	XCOM: Enemy Unknown	Turn-based tactics	Firaxis Games
2013	The Last of Us	Action-adventure	Naughty Dog
2014	Middle-earth: Shadow of Mordor	Action-adventure	Monolith Productions
2015	Super Mario Maker	Platformer	Nintendo EAD
2016	Hitman	Stealth	IO Interactive
2017	PlayerUnknown's Battlegrounds	Battle royale	PUBG Corporation
2018	Tetris Effect	Puzzle	Monstars Inc./Resonai
2019	Outer Wilds	Action-adventure	Mobius Digital
2020	Hades	Action role-playing	Supergiant Games
2021	Chicory: A Colorful Tale	Adventure	Greg Lobanov
2022	Elden Ring	Action role-playing	FromSoftware
2023	The Legend of Zelda: Tears of the Kingdom	Action-adventure	Nintendo EPD
2024	Prince of Persia: The Lost Crown	Action-adventure	Ubisoft Montpellier
2025	Clair Obscur: Expedition 33	Role-playing	Sandfall Interactive

=== The Guardian ===
Year	Game	Genre	Developer(s)
2007	Crackdown	Action-adventure	Realtime Worlds
2010	Red Dead Redemption	Action-adventure	Rockstar San Diego
2011	Portal 2	Puzzle-platformer	Valve
2012	Dishonored	Action-adventure	Arkane Studios
2012	XCOM: Enemy Unknown	Turn-based tactics	Firaxis Games
2013	Super Mario 3D World	Platformer	Nintendo EAD
2014	Mario Kart 8	Racing	Nintendo EAD
2015	Bloodborne	Action role-playing	FromSoftware
2016	Uncharted 4: A Thief's End	Action-adventure	Naughty Dog
2017	The Legend of Zelda: Breath of the Wild	Action-adventure	Nintendo EPD
2018	Red Dead Redemption 2	Action-adventure	Rockstar Games
2019	Outer Wilds	Action-adventure	Mobius Digital
2020	Animal Crossing: New Horizons	Life simulation	Nintendo EPD
2021	Returnal	Third-person shooter	Housemarque
2022	Wordle	Puzzle	Josh Wardle
2023	The Legend of Zelda: Tears of the Kingdom	Action-adventure	Nintendo EPD
2024	Astro Bot	Platformer	Team Asobi
2025	Blue Prince	Puzzle-adventure	Dogubomb

=== Hardcore Gamer ===
Year	Game	Genre	Developer(s)
2012	Far Cry 3	First-person shooter	Ubisoft
2013	The Last of Us	Action-adventure	Naughty Dog
2014	Dragon Age: Inquisition	Action role-playing	BioWare
2015	Tales from the Borderlands	Graphic adventure	Telltale Games
2016	Owlboy	Platform-adventure	D-Pad Studio
2017	Nier: Automata	Action role-playing	PlatinumGames
2018	God of War	Action-adventure	Santa Monica Studio
2019	Resident Evil 2	Survival horror	Capcom
2020	Ghost of Tsushima	Action-adventure	Sucker Punch Productions
2021	Ratchet and Clank: Rift Apart	Third-person shooter	Insomniac Games
2022	God of War Ragnarök	Action-adventure	Santa Monica Studio
2023	Alan Wake 2	Survival horror	Remedy Entertainment
2024	Astro Bot	Platformer	Team Asobi
2025	Clair Obscur: Expedition 33	Role-playing	Sandfall Interactive

=== IGN ===
Year	Game	Genre	Developer(s)
2001	Halo: Combat Evolved	First-person shooter	Bungie
2002	Battlefield 1942	First-person shooter	Digital Illusions CE
2003	Star Wars: Knights of the Old Republic	Role-playing	BioWare
2004	Half-Life 2	First-person shooter	Valve
2005	God of War	Action-adventure	Santa Monica Studio
2006	Ōkami	Action-adventure	Clover Studio
2007	Super Mario Galaxy	Platformer	Nintendo EAD
2008	Fallout 3	Action role-playing	Bethesda Game Studios
2009	Uncharted 2: Among Thieves	Action-adventure	Naughty Dog
2010	Mass Effect 2	Action role-playing	BioWare
2011	Portal 2	Puzzle-platformer	Valve
2012	Journey	Adventure	Thatgamecompany
2013	The Last of Us	Action-adventure	Naughty Dog
2014	Dragon Age: Inquisition	Action role-playing	BioWare
2015	The Witcher 3: Wild Hunt	Action role-playing	CD Projekt Red
2016	Overwatch	First-person shooter	Blizzard Entertainment
2017	The Legend of Zelda: Breath of the Wild	Action-adventure	Nintendo EPD
2018	God of War	Action-adventure	Santa Monica Studio
2019	Control	Action-adventure	Remedy Entertainment
2020	Hades	Action role-playing	Supergiant Games
2021	Forza Horizon 5	Racing	Playground Games
2022	Elden Ring	Action role-playing	FromSoftware
2023	The Legend of Zelda: Tears of the Kingdom	Action-adventure	Nintendo EPD
2024	Metaphor: ReFantazio	Role-playing	Atlus
2025	Clair Obscur: Expedition 33	Role-playing	Sandfall Interactive

=== Kotaku ===
Year	Game	Genre	Developer(s)
2007	Super Mario Galaxy	Platformer	Nintendo EAD
2008	Grand Theft Auto IV	Action-adventure	Rockstar North
2009	Uncharted 2: Among Thieves	Action-adventure	Naughty Dog
2010	Red Dead Redemption	Action-adventure	Rockstar San Diego
2011	Portal 2	Puzzle-platformer	Valve
2012	XCOM: Enemy Unknown	Turn-based tactics	Firaxis Games
2013	The Last of Us	Action-adventure	Naughty Dog
2022	Elden Ring	Action role-playing	FromSoftware
2023	Alan Wake 2	Survival horror	Remedy Entertainment
2024	Astro Bot	Platformer	Team Asobi
2025	Clair Obscur: Expedition 33	Role-playing	Sandfall Interactive

=== PC Gamer ===
Year	Game	Genre	Developer(s)
2011	The Elder Scrolls V: Skyrim	Action role-playing	Bethesda Game Studios
2012	Mass Effect 3	Action role-playing	BioWare
2013	Spelunky	Platform	Mossmouth, LLC
2014	Alien: Isolation	Survival horror	Creative Assembly
2015	Metal Gear Solid V: The Phantom Pain	Action-adventure	Kojima Productions
2016	Dishonored 2	Action-adventure	Arkane Lyon
2017	Divinity: Original Sin II	Role-playing	Larian Studios
2018	Into the Breach	Turn-based strategy	Subset Games
2019	Disco Elysium	Role-playing	ZA/UM
2020	Death Stranding	Action	Kojima Productions
2021	Valheim	Sandbox, Survival	Iron Gate Studio
2022	Elden Ring	Action role-playing	FromSoftware
2023	Baldur's Gate 3	Role-playing	Larian Studios
2024	Balatro	Roguelike deck-building	LocalThunk
2025	Kingdom Come: Deliverance II	Action role-playing	Warhorse Studios

=== Polygon ===
Year	Game	Genre	Developer(s)
2012	The Walking Dead	Graphic adventure	Telltale Games
2013	Gone Home	Adventure	The Fullbright Company
2014	Dragon Age: Inquisition	Action role-playing	BioWare
2015	Her Story	Interactive movie	Sam Barlow
2016	Doom	First-person shooter	id Software
2017	The Legend of Zelda: Breath of the Wild	Action-adventure	Nintendo EPD
2018	God of War	Action-adventure	Santa Monica Studio
2019	Outer Wilds	Action-adventure	Mobius Digital
2020	Hades	Action role-playing	Supergiant Games
2021	Inscryption	Roguelike	Daniel Mullins Games
2022	Elden Ring	Action role-playing	FromSoftware
2023	The Legend of Zelda: Tears of the Kingdom	Action-adventure	Nintendo EPD
2024	Balatro	Roguelike deck-building	LocalThunk
2025	Blue Prince	Puzzle-adventure	Dogubomb

=== The Telegraph ===
Year	Game	Genre	Developer(s)
2008	Fable II	Action role-playing	Lionhead Studios
2009	Uncharted 2: Among Thieves	Action-adventure	Naughty Dog
2011	Batman: Arkham City	Action-adventure	Rocksteady Studios
2012	The Walking Dead	Graphic adventure	Telltale Games
2013	The Last of Us	Action-adventure	Naughty Dog
2014	Alien: Isolation	Survival horror	Creative Assembly
2015	Bloodborne	Action role-playing	FromSoftware
2016	Dishonored 2	Action-adventure	Arkane Studios
2017	The Legend of Zelda: Breath of the Wild	Action-adventure	Nintendo EPD
2018	Red Dead Redemption 2	Action-adventure	Rockstar Games
2019	Sekiro: Shadows Die Twice	Action-adventure	FromSoftware
2020	The Last of Us Part II	Action-adventure	Naughty Dog
2021	Deathloop	First-person shooter	Arkane Studios
2022	Elden Ring	Action role-playing	FromSoftware

=== Time ===
Year	Game	Genre	Developer(s)
2006	Wii Sports	Sports	Nintendo EAD
2007	Halo 3	First-person shooter	Bungie
2008	Grand Theft Auto IV	Action-adventure	Rockstar North
2009	Call of Duty: Modern Warfare 2	First-person shooter	Infinity Ward
2010	Alan Wake	Action-adventure	Remedy Entertainment
2011	Minecraft	Sandbox	Mojang
2012	Guild Wars 2	MMORPG	ArenaNet
2013	Grand Theft Auto V	Action-adventure	Rockstar North
2014	80 Days	Interactive fiction	Inkle
2015	Prune	Puzzle	Joel McDonald
2016	The Witness	Puzzle	Thekla, Inc.
2017	The Legend of Zelda: Breath of the Wild	Action-adventure	Nintendo EPD
2018	God of War	Action-adventure	Santa Monica Studio
2020	Hades	Action role-playing	Supergiant Games
2021	Metroid Dread	Action-adventure	MercurySteam
2022	God of War Ragnarök	Action-adventure	Santa Monica Studio
2023	Alan Wake 2	Survival horror	Remedy Entertainment
2024	Dragon Age: The Veilguard	Action role-playing	BioWare
2025	Clair Obscur: Expedition 33	Role-playing	Sandfall Interactive

=== USgamer ===
Year	Game	Genre	Developer(s)
2015	Super Mario Maker	Platform	Nintendo EAD
2016	Overwatch	First-person shooter	Blizzard Entertainment
2017	The Legend of Zelda: Breath of the Wild	Action-adventure	Nintendo EPD
2018	Red Dead Redemption 2	Action-adventure	Rockstar Games
2019	Disco Elysium	Role-playing	ZA/UM
2020	Hades	Action role-playing	Supergiant Games

=== Yahoo! ===
Year	Game	Genre	Developer(s)
2007	Super Mario Galaxy	Platformer	Nintendo EAD
2008	Fallout 3	Action role-playing	Bethesda Game Studios
2009	Uncharted 2: Among Thieves	Action-adventure	Naughty Dog
2010	Red Dead Redemption	Action-adventure	Rockstar San Diego
2011	Batman: Arkham City	Action-adventure	Rocksteady Studios
2012	The Walking Dead	Graphic adventure	Telltale Games
2013	The Last of Us	Action-adventure	Naughty Dog
2014	Dragon Age: Inquisition	Action role-playing	BioWare
2015	The Witcher 3: Wild Hunt	Action role-playing	CD Projekt Red
2017	The Legend of Zelda: Breath of the Wild	Action-adventure	Nintendo EPD

== See also ==
- List of video games considered the best
- List of video game awards
