= Brány Skeldalu 2: Pátý Učedník =

Czech adventure video game

The Fifth Disciple / Brány Skeldalu II
- Developer(s): Napoleon Games
- Publisher(s): Napoleon Games
- Platform(s): Microsoft Windows
- Release: December 1, 2002
- Genre(s): Adventure

The Fifth Disciple (aka Brány Skeldalu II) is a Czech adventure video game by Napoleon Games that was released on December 1, 2002 for Microsoft Windows. It is the sequel to Brány Skeldalu and was followed by Brány Skeldalu 3: 7 Mágů.

== Plot and gameplay ==
Engeor, a student at the University of Magic, needs to save their homeland Rovenland from the evil wizard Wahargem.

The Fifth Disciple is a fantasy point and click adventure with RPG elements and inventory based puzzles.

== Critical reception ==
Just Adventure gave the game an A, praising its combat and linking it to that of Shannara. Bonusweb felt it was a high-quality game that deserved attention from the video game industry. While Tiscali.cz questioned the mix of genres, overall they felt the game was enjoyable.
