= Bzzzt =

- Developer: KO.DLL
- Publisher: Cinemax
- Composer: Martin Linda
- Platforms: Windows; Linux; MacOS; Nintendo Switch
- Release: 13 November 2023 - 19 September 2024 (NS)
- Genre: Platform
- Mode: Single-player

Bzzzt is a platform game developed by Karel Matějka (KO.DLL) and published in 2023 for macOS, Linux, Windows, and Nintendo Switch. The player controls a small robot in a futuristic environment, mimicking 8-bit arcade video games.

== Plot ==
The game is set in the year 4096. Scientists Emma and Robert dedicated their lives to working on new technologies and the result is artificial intelligence ZX8000. All that remains is to transfer consciousness into the body of a small robot and test all its functions and abilities. Although the original idea of the scientists was good, not everything goes according to plan in the creation of a toaster-sized robot. Testing is interrupted by the villain Badbert. ZX8000 has a difficult task ahead - it must save the scientists and the whole world.

== Gameplay ==
The game can be played in three different levels of difficulty. The easiest difficulty gives the player three lives per level, crazy difficulty gives player only seven lives for the entire game. There is also normal difficulty. Players can compare their results in global rankings or beat time records for individual levels. Another challenge in the game is collecting points - screws and completing each level with the full number.

With the increasing number of abilities, the robot becomes more and more agile. It can gradually chain double jumps and overcome increasingly difficult obstacles and traps. Completing all 52 levels takes an average of 2.5 - 3.5 hours and is suitable for beginners due to the different difficulties. It is available in nine languages, including Czech.

The robot is controlled in a side-view perspective on either a gamepad or keyboard. For the ability to transfer energy, the robot becomes a spark of ones and zeros that flies, using the arrows on the keyboard is impractical, due to sensitive controls. A gamepad is recommended.

== Development ==
This action retro jumper was created in the workshop of developer Karel Matějka, under the name Ko.dll. He also created the pixel art graphic processing, for which he has been known for a long time. The music was also provided by Martin Linda in collaboration with Matějka. To create the soundtrack, Linda used the Rytmik program that he developed himself. The game was published by CINEMAX s.r.o. and released on 13 November 2023.

The static pixel art background features 1.25 million hand-drawn pixels that took 4 years to create.

== Reception ==
The game has received generally positive reviews holding 91% on Metacritic indicating "Universal Acclaim."

=== Accolades ===
- 1st in INDIE OF THE YEAR on IndianTV - Community Vote
- 6th place on IndieDB's INDIE OF THE YEAR 2023 - Player Vote
- Best Design GDS 2022
- Indie Community Vote GDS 2022
- Czech Game of the Year Awards: Audiovisual Execution of 2023
