= Ylands =

2019 sandbox game

- Developer: Bohemia Interactive
- Publisher: Bohemia Interactive
- Composer: Varhan Orchestrovič Bauer
- Engine: Unity
- Platforms: Windows; Android; iOS
- Release: 5 December 2019
- Genre: Survival
- Modes: Single-player, multiplayer

Ylands is a 2019 adventure game developed by Bohemia Interactive.

== Gameplay ==
Developers describe Ylands as "a low poly adventure game focusing on exploration, building and fighting." Adventurers sail between ylands and regions to gather resources, craft tools, discover unexpected adventures and encounter a variety of wildlife while trying to survive the elements with friends or alone. They are led by the Adventurers Handbook which is given to all new members of the Classy Adventurers Guild.

Ylands gives players freedom in choosing how they play the game. One aspect of the game lets the players can focus on the exploration part of the game, in which they can travel to six different regions, discover new resources and encounter a variety of adventures. A core gameplay mechanic is crafting and building, which allows the players to use the resources they have gathered to progress in the game by crafting tools needed to improve their ships and access new crafting recipes. Ylands also includes survival aspects, which along with combat give an edge to the overall relaxing atmosphere of the game.

The integral mechanic of the game is the Adventurers Handbook, which guides the players on their adventures and gives an insight into the story of the Classy Adventurers Guild.

== Development ==
The game was announced on 24 November 2017 when the Alpha version of the game was released on Bohemia Interactive's website. The game was formally announced worldwide on 1 November 2016 when it became part of project Bohemia Incubator. The Steam version of the game was announced on March 9, 2017, and released on December 6, 2017. According to the game's Steam page, the full version of the game was scheduled to be released 6–8 months after its release on Steam.

The game was released on 5 December 2019. The game switched to free-to-play as it was released.

On 18 April 2023, the game released its Update 2.0, which is a major milestone, as the game can now be considered an adventure game which incorporated a large amount of community feedback into the development of the previous almost 3 years.

== Reception ==
The game was nominated for 4 Czech Game of the Year Awards including categories Main Award, Best technological solution, Best Game Design and Free-to-play. It managed to win in categories Best technological solution and Free-to-play
