= Vigor (video game) =

2019 free-to-play shooter game

- Developer: Bohemia Interactive
- Publisher: Bohemia Interactive
- Engine: Unreal Engine 4
- Platforms: Xbox One; PlayStation 4; PlayStation 5; Xbox Series X/S; Microsoft Windows
- Release: Xbox One; August 19, 2019; Nintendo Switch; July 8, 2020 - June 25, 2025; PlayStation 4, PlayStation 5 December 9, 2020; Xbox Series X/S; August 18, 2021; Microsoft Windows; September 18, 2024
- Genre: Looter shooter
- Mode: Multiplayer

Vigor is a free-to-play online survival shooter game originally developed for the Xbox One by the Czech studio Bohemia Interactive. From July 2020 - June 2025, it was available on the Nintendo Switch but it has now been discontinued. Initially released as an early access title in August 2018, the game was fully released on August 19, 2019. A PlayStation 4 and PlayStation 5 port was released on December 9, 2020. On September 18, 2024, Vigor was released on Steam as well, after being there in Early Access for 4 months.

At the time of the PC release, Bohemia Interactive said that Vigor had been played by more than 20 million players across Xbox, PlayStation and Nintendo Switch since its initial launch.

== Gameplay ==
Vigor is an online free-to-play survival shooter game set in post-apocalyptic Norway. The goal is to stay alive and upgrade an abandoned shelter that will protect the player against the harsh environment.

=== Encounters ===
Players called Outlanders must seek resources and better equipment during Encounters with other players, although fighting them is not required. Only care packages or self defense enforce the use of violence. Every Encounter has a map that shows all exit points to players, as well as Points of Interest (POIs), such as hideouts, outposts, houses, a radio tower, and a transformer station. The POIs can offer valuable resources to help players upgrade their Shelter and reach its maximum level. Doing so will generate more materials and food to use, as well as reduce the crafting time for weapons and consumables. There are also places called Loot Events such as the Barred House, the Locked Container and the Timed Safe. These Loot Events offer significantly better loot than POIs and their content can be upgraded by Crowns in the game lobby before the Encounter starts.

An important aspect of an Encounter is the airdrop. These are crates containing valuable loot such as weapon and consumable blueprints, resources, weapon skins, and Crowns (in-game currency). These are dropped by a C-130 or AC-130, and signal that radiation will start appearing soon. The rarity of the airdrop can be upgraded in the game lobby using Crowns. The map shows the general location where the airdrop will happen, but there are options to change the location by using the Comm Station. Airdrops are not triggered by players and instead occur at a predetermined time. When a player picks up an airdrop, their location is immediately revealed on the map to enemy Outlanders. The Comm Station can also be used to buff or debuff the airdrop. For example, it can be buffed by adding extra loot and resources or debuffed by making it radioactive. A radioactive airdrop poisons the player that touches it with radiation, giving them little time to make it out alive.

In every Encounter, a radiation cloud sweeps the area after a certain amount of time. When this occurs, players have to be quick and evacuate before they die from radiation. If the player has the special consumable iodine, they can stay longer because of its protection. There are many consumables that Outlanders can take with them in to Encounters, each one serving a specific purpose.

If players survive the Encounter, anything they've looted will be added to their inventory. However, if they die, all of their loot will be lost, as well as any weapons, ammo and consumables brought with them. There is an option to buy Insurance in the lobby before the Encounter starts using Crowns. Having an Insurance will save the players from losing their loadout and items looted in the map upon dying.

=== Shootout ===
A fast-paced solo combat where players spawn with randomized weapons, but can scour the map to find better weapons and take down other Outlanders. If players die, they will be respawned with a new weapon and ammo. Matches last 10 minutes and use a scoring system. The more Outlanders the players eliminate, the higher the score they get, with higher scoring players receiving better rewards.

=== Elimination ===
A 5v5 tactical, round-based team fight, where players work together to eliminate the opposing team or to capture the opposing team's flag.

In the pre-loadout screen, all players in the lobby will be able to buy score multiplier boosters which can be applied to all players in the lobby. Players can also purchase loadout tickets using crowns.

When Elimination mode starts, there will be 5 premade loadouts with guns and consumables. These loadouts are permanent for the whole session. Each player picks one loadout after which, that loadout will be grayed out and no other player can choose that loadout. However, if a player likes a loadout that is already closed, he can use a loadout ticket and open the grayed out slot and select it as his active loadout. This can occur once per round and a maximum of 5 times per match. If a player hasn't selected a loadout by the time the pre-round phase ends, a loadout will be selected for him randomly.

Events are gameplay modifiers that randomly appear to add variety to Encounters, Eliminations, and Shootouts. They can significantly or subtly alter match conditions, affecting strategy and playstyle. Challenges are time-limited objectives, usually lasting one week. Completing them rewards players with cosmetics (skins), materials, Crowns, and Booster Tickets.

== Shelter ==
The player can do various things at their Shelter, such as:

- Target shooting and timed shooting
- Collecting resources from different stations, such as rat traps and boxes of herbs
- Crafting weapons, ammo, and consumables to add to their load-outs or stockpile
- Choosing cosmetics like emotes or clothing

The Shelter can be upgraded by using resources found in Encounters. These resources include wires, nails, chemicals, fuel, food, spare parts, glass, etc. Each part of the Shelter requires different materials to upgrade, and once players start upgrading, their Shelter will begin generating crafting materials for them. Which means that the more players upgrade the Shelter, the more it will eventually help them.

As the Shelter is upgraded, its interior and exterior appearance changes. Every level requires a certain number of upgrades. The Shelter includes a shooting range where players can practice shooting targets, test weapon recoil, and complete challenges. The scarecrows in the shooting range have the same amount of health as an enemy Outlanders, allowing players to test weapons and compare their damage before entering an Encounter.

Lastly, there's an area in the Shelter where Outlanders can donate food. The reward by donating food is a crate which increases in rarity with the amount of food players donate.

Outlanders can edit their load-out with their preferred weapons and consumables. Every weapon and consumable can be crafted from relevant parts or with materials, the correct plan that drops from crates, and an upgraded crafting table. You’ll notice that weapons you can craft are marked with a yellow wrench icon. Each weapon has a different crafting time depending on rarity, and only one weapon and one consumable can be crafted at the same time. If a player is looking to craft a specific weapon but is missing some parts, they can select the weapon and see exactly what they're missing before entering an Encounter and trying to loot the things they need.

Players can also deconstruct weapons, ammo, resources, consumables, or parts they don't need, and the acquired materials can be used for crafting.

== Battle Pass – Seasons ==
Each new season is intended to bring new weapons, consumables, and purchasable cosmetic items.

Associated with seasons are time-limited battle passes that reward players with new cosmetic items, weapons, and consumable blueprints should they reach certain levels in the battle pass. Alongside new cosmetic items, seasons can also bring additional gameplay elements.

Season	Title	Period	Description
1	Preppers	December 11, 2019 – February 5, 2020	Season 1 brought the game's first battle pass and a large number of cosmetic items. In addition, season 1 saw the introduction of multiple new weapons into the game and consumables like the Contact Bomb, the Transmitter and the Alarm Trap.
2	Hunters	February 5, 2020 – April 8, 2020	Season 2 saw the addition of new weapons such as a crossbow, the Mosin-Nagant rifle and a new knife called "The John". Season 2 also introduced new consumables in the forms of the Fake Glint and the Portable Signal Detector. The battle pass for season 2, saw new cosmetic items added and some changes in the in-game store.
3	Rivals	April 8, 2020 – June 17, 2020	With season 3, Iodine and Caffeine were added as new consumables and the PSS, SVU and MP5-K SD3 were added as new weapons. The battle pass for season 3 introduced new cosmetic items in the form of facewear (masks / eyewear / full headpieces). Lastly, some improvements were made in the weapon stats UI and the reward screen.
4	Warlords	June 17, 2020 – September 9, 2020	Season 4 introduced a new game mode - Elimination as well as new consumables like the Jammer and the Mortar Strike. New weapons such as the Bugle F1, Uk vz. 59, M249, RM14 were added along with a new form of mementos - lighters. During season 4 there was an overhaul done on the Comm Station.
5	Renegades	September 9, 2020 – November 11, 2020	In season 5, a new map was added into the game - the Sawmill map. Some gameplay changes were made with the addition of custom teams for Elimination, the addition of the Lone Wolf mode for the Encounters as well as an option to play Encounters with a group of 3 people. Some new weapons were added to the game like the SW-SH 629, Gal, KS-23 and the AKM Bayonet. Lastly, there was the addition of the Booby Trap consumable and a map rotation in the game.
6	Junkers	November 11, 2020 – February 3, 2021	Season 6 saw the addition of a new map - Anniken as well a new type of memento in the form of vinyls. New weapons were added into the game like the Sawed-Off Shotgun, the RPK-74, the M3 (fighting knife) and the ZA M76. The Decoy and the Armor Plate were added as new consumables. In terms of gameplay, a new minigame was added to the Shelter as well as a special Encounter event where players had to fight over the Disruptive Tower.
7	Mercenaries	February 3, 2021 – April 21, 2021	In season 7, new weapons like the B93 Raffica, M60E3 and La Chiave were added into the game along with openable and locked exits. In addition, a new mechanic was implemented where a mortar strike was called on players who resolved into camping. Lastly, a new widget was added for equipping ammo together with the selected weapon and some general fixes and optimizations.
8	Trappers	April 21, 2021 – August 18, 2021	Season 8 saw the addition of the Legacy Seasons Tap where players from PlayStation 4, PlayStation 5 and Nintendo Switch would be able to play past seasons that were only available for Xbox players. A new weapon was added to the game, the PH M82 along with two new packs, the Hunter pack and the Prey pack. The mortar strike that was introduced in season 7 was removed and two loot events were added for every Encounter. Lastly, some bug fixes were made along with some XP re-balancing and changes in the Shootout rewards.
9	Stalkers	August 18, 2021 – November 2, 2021	In season 9, grenades were added into the game along with a new weapon, the A74-KSU. New generation consoles received some performance enhancements and Elimination mode got some improvements in the gameplay and the rewards system. Lastly, the game saw the addition of a Czech localization.
10	Chronicles: Vengeance	November 3, 2021 – March 15, 2022	Seasons are changed to Chronicles. In Chronicles: Vengeance, flash grenades were added into the game, along with a new weapon, the L85A1. With this update, lore was added to the game in the form of cassettes. Kjerstin was introduced as a new map in Shootout.
11	Chronicles: Perseverance	March 16, 2022 – May 31, 2022	In Chronicles: Perseverance, a new map called Kjerstin was added as an Encounter map. The game saw the addition of the Remy M870 shotgun and the Improvised Mine. A batch of new lore cassettes were added that told the story of Freyja and her search for a new home.
12	Chronicles: Absolution	June 1, 2022 – September 20, 2022	In Chronicles: Absolution, radiation grenades were added into the game, along with a new weapon, the L86A1 LSW. New lore cassettes were added that followed the research of Dr. Dubois and Dr. Azimov as they stumble upon a dark secret in their search to reverse the effects of radiation. A new Elimination Map was added in Fiske Fabrikk.
13	Chronicles: Deliverance	September 21, 2022 – February 7, 2023	In Chronicles: Deliverance, adrenaline shots were added into the game, along with a new weapon, the SMG Berry M12. This proved to be the Season of crossovers with the new premium pack Fallen Crown of DayZ added along with Arma Reforger cosmetics in the Battle Pass.
14	Chronicles: Reckoning	February 8, 2023 – May 16, 2023	In Chronicles: Reckoning, bear traps were added into the game, along with a new weapon, the M4A1 assault rifle. A new map called Myren was introduced as a Shootout map and Performance Mode was added to Xbox Series X.
15	Chronicles: Salvation	May 17, 2023 – August 8, 2023	In Chronicles: Salvation, Myren was added as a brand new Encounter map along with the L96 sniper rifle. There were a few quality of life changes such as categorization of weapons in the "Equip" tab, new visualizations when players level up their Shelter and notifications when the Shelter generators have reached their maximum production capacity.
16	Chronicles: Damnation	August 9, 2023 – October 24, 2023	In Chronicles: Damnation, the FG 42 machine gun was added in the game. There were several improvements in terms of matchmaking, the Buried Cache, the Flash Grenade and grenade-throwing mechanics in general. There rewards for the Airdrop received a boosted and the drop rates for Weapon and Consumable Plans in all Crates were increased.
17	Chronicles: Malediction	October 25, 2023 – February 6, 2024	Chronicles: Malediction introduced brand-new and improved Leaderboards across all game modes, the new Taiga 21 automatic shotgun and Myren was added as an Elimination map with 4 arenas available. Booster Tickets were introduced in the game, where players can either purchase them from the General Store or earn them through the Battle Pass.
18	Chronicles: Isolation	February 7, 2024 – May 14, 2024	Chronicles: Isolation introduced a much requested consumable - the smoke grenade! In addition, Shootout mode received a brand new map in Eikevjen and the Battle Pass was filled with winter military cosmetics. Last but not least, the new M14 Assault Rifle was added as the new gun, along with the V4 Viper knife to accompany the newly-added melee improvements.
19	Chronicles: Deception	May 15, 2024 – September 17, 2024	Chronicles: Damnation added a maritime inspired Season with cosmetics from naval officers and modern day pirates. The Barracuda knife plan was added to the Battle Pass. PlayStation Plus member were able to get the Deadly Blossom pack and Xbox Game Pass Ultimate subscribers could get the Heatwave Havoc pack. Legacy Seasons were removed and bugs like the invisible house were fixed.
20	Chronicles: Genesis	September 18, 2024 – December 3, 2025	Chronicles: Genesis saw the full release of Vigor on Steam as a free-to-play game. Besides that, the update introduced the much awaited Weapon Overhaul to consoles as well as a new Encounter map - Eikevjen. The new Tyr M46 pistol was added in an 80s action heroes inspired Battle Pass. Genesis also marked the end of the “chronicles” era of Vigor.
21	Bloodline	December 4, 2025 – April 9, 2025	Season 21 Bloodline saw some much requested features in console crossplay, allowing Playstation, Xbox and Switch face off in-game. A new Laceration effect was added causing tick damage when harmed by knives, crossbows and beartraps and requiring a bandage to stop. The charity box was revamped into the Donation Hub allowing players to donate materials alongside food for better crates and a spot on the new Donation Hub Leaderboard.
22	Meltdown	April 10, 2025 – June 24,2025	Season 22 Meltdown saw the addition of a new shelter upgrade - The Wardrobe - which had 9 levels allowing for a total of 5 outfit presets and 5 weapon presets at max. A new memento was added in the form of action figures depicting the various seasons and their outfits. Season 22 also came with the unfortunate termination of the switch service on 26 May 2025.
23	Turmoil	June 25, 2025 – September 9, 2025	Season 23 Turmoil brought updated visual effects for the Radiation waves. The Crafting side got a massive update with the addition of batch crafting, a much requested feature. A new consumable was added in the form of the Impact Grenade. Additionally the Unexploded missile was released as a new POI. We also got carnage event modifiers to spice up shootouts.
24	Tempest	September 10, 2025 – November 25, 2025	Season 24 Tempest brought a new Military grade SMG in the form of the PP-19. Eliminations gained 4 new arenas taking place on the Batterie Draug map. The Challenge system was added with 3 challenges (Airdrop Hunt, Outlands Duty and Terminal Call) that rotated on a regular basis. New Gestures were also added with this update. A limited time Halloween event was added in the form of Draugr Hunt.
25	Pursuit	November 26, 2025 – February 17 2026	Season 25 Pursuit came with one of the biggest updates in vigor. We received a new encounter map Øen as well as 3 new weapons - The M62 Assault Rifle, Vz.82 Pistol, and M7 Bayonet Knife. We also received a Weapon Mastery System allowing players to gain mastery skins and badges by using various weapons. Mastery is unlocked upon getting all 5 shooting badges to gold in the shooting range. We received 7 encounter events as well as the new shootout skybreak and elimination showdown events respectively. We got the fourth Encounter challenge event in Lootrush. We also got a new shelter customization with shelter posters for outfit presets.
26	Solitude	February 18, 2026 – May 12, 2026	Season 26 Solitude brought the addition of 3 new weapons - the AUR LSW light machine gun, the APS pistol and the A-74K Bayonet. The Dev team also announced that their team has gotten smaller over the past years, and have reached the point where they can’t keep releasing full updates so there will be fewer features added to the game in coming seasons.
27	Uproar	May 13, 2026 - August 4, 2026	Season 27 saw the addition of the AMD-65 assault rifle. It also brought in Cosmetic Tickets as a replacement to new cosmetic items, allowing players to unlock cosmetics from a set pool.
28	Frontier	August 5, 2026 - October 28, 2026	Season 28 saw a new battlepass featuring the cosmetic tickets and otherwise no new content.
29	Pariah	October 29, 2026 - Present	Season 29 saw a new battlepass featuring the cosmetic tickets. A new Seasonal rewards featuring a new action figure

== Development ==
Bohemia Interactive announced Vigor on 11 June 2018 during E3. The game launched in Xbox Preview on July 31, 2018.

Vigor was in the Xbox Preview until August 19, 2019, when it was released as a free-to-play title on Gamescom. It was also featured in the Inside Xbox Show.

The Nintendo Switch version was announced in a Nintendo Direct on March 26, 2020. The closed beta ran from April 9 to 16 and the game was fully released on July 8, 2020.

The game was released on December 9, 2020, on PlayStation 4 and PlayStation 5. After a week, it was reported that over 1 million players had joined the game.

On April 17, 2024, Bohemia Interactive announced that after 5 years of being a console title, Vigor would be arriving on PC as well. It was announced that initially, the game would land as an Early Access title on Steam, before being fully released on September 18, 2024.

== Reception ==
The game was played by more than 700,000 players during early access. After the game was released, it became one of top 20 most played Xbox One titles as it was played by over 1,200,000 players.

The game was nominated for 3 Czech Game of the Year Awards including categories Main Award, Best Technological Solution, and Free-to-play.

In 2019, the game was nominated for an award in the Technology category in the Central & Eastern European Game Awards (CEEGA).
