= Planet Nomads =

2019 sandbox video game

- Developer: Craneballs Studio
- Engine: Unity
- Platforms: Microsoft Windows; OS X Linux
- Release: 3 May 2019
- Genre: Sandbox
- Mode: Single-player

Planet Nomads is a 2019 science fiction sandbox video game developed by Craneballs Studio.

== Gameplay ==
The player is an astronaut who crash-lands on an extrasolar planet. The player is then tasked with surviving with his equipment and skill. He can create new equipment, vehicles, build shelters, etc... The developers say the game was inspired by games such as Minecraft, Space Engineers and No Man's Sky. The game is mainly about exploration of the surface of the planet. There are multiple biomes that player can come across to. The main threats to the players survival are alien wildlife living on the planet, extreme weather or radiation. The planet itself is procedurally generated and the landscape is voxel-based.

== Development ==
Craneballs Studio began working on Planet Nomads in January 2015. It is the first desktop video game developed by the studio whose previous games were all released for mobile devices. The developers decided to fund the game through Kickstarter, however while in the campaign video they say that they can fund the game via their mobile games, the Kickstarter funds would allow for more time to be invested in the development. Preparation began in Summer 2015 and the campaign was launched on 21 January 2016. The Kickstarter campaign goal was 70,000 Pounds. The campaign was successfully funded with 96,045 Pounds. In a developers blog update on March 9, 2017, the game's release date was announced for Early Access on Steam and Games in Development on GOG on April 18, 2017.

== Reception ==
The game was nominated for 2 Czech Game of the Year Awards including categories Main Award and Best technological solution.
