= Overkill 2 =

2013 video game

- Developer: Craneballs Studio
- Platforms: iOS; Android; Ouya
- Release: 3 April 2013
- Genres: Rail shooter, first-person shooter
- Modes: Single-player, multiplayer

Overkill 2 is a free-to-play video game developed by Craneballs Studio, the sequel to Overkill. The game is available in English, Spanish, Chinese, Japanese, German, Portuguese and Russian.

As of October 2014, Overkill 2 has garnered over 4 million downloads on Google Play. It was followed by its successor Overkill 3

== Gameplay ==
Overkill 2 is very similar to its predecessor. It is a rail shooter, where player has to kill as many enemies as they can. Enemies attack in waves. The player gains money for every killed enemy, which can be used to buy a new weapon or upgrade. There are over 40 kinds of weapons with multiple upgrades. Money can be bought for real currency.

== Reception ==
The game received mostly positive reviews, with a score of 67% on critical review aggregator site Metacritic. Positive reviews praised the game's gameplay and graphics, noting a variety of weapons and other items. Some reviews also praised its length. Apple'N'Apps, however, criticised the game's repetitive gameplay and "grind to get new stuff".
