= Craneballs Studio =

Czech video game developer

- Type: Private
- Industry: Video games
- Founded: 2008; 18 years ago
- Defunct: January 2024
- Headquarters: Czech Republic
- Key people: Martin Chamrad; Jakub Smid; Jan Cefelin
- Number of employees: 20

Craneballs Studio was a video game development company based in the Czech Republic. It was founded in 2008. The company originally focused on web design and making graphics. It started to develop video games near the end of 2008 due to the 2008 financial crisis. Its first video game was released in 2009 and was financially successful. Its other games were successful too, so the studio grew from three people to around 20.

== Games ==
- 2009 – Blimp: The Flying Adventures – An arcade game developed with Grip Games.
- 2009 – 33rd Division – A stealth action video game.
- 2010 – Monorace – An infinity running game
- 2010 – SuperRope – An arcade game.
- 2011 – Overkill – A rail shooter.
- 2012 – Fish Heroes – An arcade game inspired by Angry Birds.
- 2013 – Overkill 2 – A sequel to the original Overkill.
- 2013 – 33rd Division – A reboot of a 2009 video game.
- 2014 – Overkill Mafia – A spin-off to the main Overkill series.
- 2015 – Overkill 3 – The third game in the Overkill series.
- 2015 – Overcute: Cube Worm – game inspired by Snake
- 2015 – Delta Force Army Training – First-person shooter
- 2015 – Splash Cars – An arcade game.
- 2016 – Ninja Madness – Platform game
- 2019 – Planet Nomads – A Sandbox game.
