= Feudal Alloy =

2019 video game

- Developer: Attu Games
- Publisher: Attu Games
- Designer: Lukáš Navrátil
- Engine: Unity
- Platforms: Windows, macOS, Android, PlayStation 4, Xbox One, Nintendo Switch
- Release: 17 January 2019
- Genre: Platform role-playing
- Mode: Single-player

Feudal Alloy is a 2019 platform role-playing video game by Czech studio Attu Games.

== Story ==
Attu is a robot whose village was raided by bandits. He decides to take an action and sets out after the bandits to get the stolen goods back.

== Gameplay ==
Feudal Alloy belongs to the Metroidvania genre. Players control a robot in mechanised medieval armor. Players search tunnels full of enemies, seeking paths to new areas and components to upgrade the robot's gear. As the game progresses, players meet stronger enemies but also gains access to better equipment. Players also must check the robot's oil, upgrade and temperature bars. If the robot's temperature is too high, players must wait until it cools down. The oil bar represents players' health and the upgrade bar represents their experience.

== Reception ==
Feudal Alloy has received generally positive reviews from critics. It holds 76% on Metacritic. The game was also nominated for Czech Game of the Year Award in category Audiovisual Execution.
