= Hrot =

2023 first person shooter video game

- Developer: Spytihněv
- Publisher: Spytihněv
- Composers: Sjellos; HartWare
- Platform: Microsoft Windows
- Release: 16 May 2023
- Genre: First-person shooter
- Mode: Single-player

Hrot (stylized as HROT) is a 2023 first-person shooter video game developed by a Czech game developer Spytihněv. The game is a homage to the 3D shooters of the 1990s and is primarily inspired by Chasm: The Rift and Quake. The early access version was released on 29 January 2021, and included the first of three episodes. The full version was released on 16 May 2023. It has received positive reviews; being singled out for its level design and atmosphere.

== Plot ==
The story is set in Czechoslovakia following an unspecified disaster of 1986. The protagonist leaves a civil defense shelter under Kosmonautů station to fight strange intruders who attacked Czechoslovakia. He fights these enemies throughout Prague and other places of Czechoslovakia. He eventually finds out that Orloj isn't working as it lost a gear. According to a local legend, the country will suffer if the clock is neglected and its good operation is placed in jeopardy. The protagonist reaches Strahov Stadium. He fights the supreme commander-in-chief of intruders who damaged Orloj and defeats him. The protagonist then destroys his heart and takes the gear from Orloj that was placed in the commander's heart. It allows the protagonist to repair Orloj and save the country in process.

== Gameplay ==
Hrot is a retro-styled first-person shooter. Players explore and navigate to the exit of each level, facing monsters and finding secret areas along the way. Usually, there are switches to activate or keys to collect in order to open doors before the exit can be reached. Reaching the exit takes the player to the next level.

The campaign is divided into three episodes. It is set in 1986 in an alternate reality Czechoslovakia which was struck by an unknown disaster. The first episode has 8 levels with a boss fight in every second level. Each level is set in a real location in Prague. This includes Vyšehrad or Vítkov Hill. The second episode, which was inspired by the Hussite era and Bohemian castles, released on 22 June 2022. The third episode, titled The Gastroscopy, features another 8 levels and an additional secret level.

== Development ==
Hrot was in development since 2017. The developer used his own proprietary engine, programmed in Pascal and utilizing the GLScene graphics library. The idea for the game first came in 1997 when Spytihněv considered developing a game similar to Quake or Chasm: The Rift. The game was announced in September 2019. The early access version was released on 29 January 2021, and included the first of three episodes called Kiss me Gustav. The second episode called Degustation was released on 22 June 2022. The full version with the final episode called Gastroscopy was released on 16 May 2023.

== Reception ==
Reception

Aggregate scores
| Aggregator | Score |
|---|---|
| Metacritic | PC: 86/100 |
| OpenCritic | 83/100; 100% Critics Recommend |

Review scores
| Publication | Score |
|---|---|
| PC Gamer (US) | 87/100 |
| Games.cz | 9/10 |
| SEKTOR.sk | 8/10 |

On Metacritic, Hrot received "Generally Favorable Reviews"; holding an 86 on Metacritic based on 7 reviews.

PC Gamer's Ted Litchfield appraised it enthusiastically, awarding the game an 87 for its level design, atmosphere, and movement, while stating "Some manner of zombie Vladimir Lenin boss fight was right there for the taking—there's a ton of era-appropriate Lenin imagery throughout all three episodes that would have made for effective foreshadowing, and Mecha Lenin would have felt like a far more earned, absurd, real life political figure final boss. I would have also settled for a zombie Brezhnev, but reanimated Stalin would have been gauche. Ending gripes aside though, I love Hrot, and it had me hooked right up until that vexing final fight. Hrot is a truly excellent FPS, one of the best of the boomer shooter renaissance."

Publication Rock Paper Shotgun complimented its level design and soviet atmosphere but criticized its weapon selection. The reviewer praised the first episode the most, saying "Here, the game's socialist parody and nuclear anxiety are in perfect sync. As you wander through Prague's abandoned streets, gymnasiums, and cultural centres, you'll encounter pictures of Czechoslovakia's first communist dictator Klement Gottwald, which you can kiss to show your allegiance to the nation. Later, you'll descend into some subterranean chamber lined with desiccated corpses, as that Geiger-counter crackle rises to an overwhelming crescendo" while the subsequential episodes "lacked the same coherence".

On Czech Game of the Year Awards 2023, the game received a prize for Best Game Design.
