= Brány Skeldalu =

1998 video game

Gates of Skeldal
- Developer(s): Napoleon Games
- Publisher(s): JRC Interactive
- Programmer(s): Ondřej Novák
- Writer(s): Jindřich Rohlík
- Series: Gates of Skeldal
- Platform(s): Windows, MS-DOS, Android, iOS
- Release: MS-DOS: 1 November 1998; Windows: 2005; IOS/Android: 15 January 2014
- Genre(s): Role-playing
- Mode(s): Single player

Gates of Skeldal (Czech: Brány Skeldalu) is a Dungeon crawler role-playing video game. The 2D and 3D graphics combining game was developed by Czech studio Napoleon Games and published by JRC Interactive in 1998. In 2007 the game was made freeware, followed by the opening of the source code in 2008. After a successful crowdfunding campaign, a port for mobile phones was released in 2014.

== Plot ==
The game is set on an ancient island named Rovenland. It is said that Rovenland is a land full of magic as the elder gods rested here when they created the world. But, the world's balance is threatened by five evil mages who try to open a gate into the forbidden dimension of Zohar. Therefore, the mages built in the south of the island Skeldal tower, filled with monsters to keep everyone in distance. An old scholar named Freghar intents to stop them. He uses a rite to summon three heroes but dies in process. The heroes are then set up to stop the mages and are joined later by another three people - a thief Roland, a mage Gralt and a brave son of a librarian, Erik. They seek help at Nimeth who is revealed to the person who trained the five evil mages. The mages betrayed Nimeth when they came across the Scroll of Nogran, which promises wealth and power for committing the described rite and opening a gate to forbidden dimensions. Nimeth sends the heroes out to gain five artifacts as these are a source of power for the mages. After capturing these artifacts the group forges them into a Sword of Revenge. The group is then sent to Skeldal tower to stop the mage's ritual. Arriving in the last minute, the heroes are able to stop the rite and kill the evil mages. The summoned heroes then return to their homeland, while Gralt sets up for new adventure, Roland becomes an honorable merchant and Erik returns home.

The core characters and protagonists of the game are:

- Wahargem - One of three heroes summoned by Freghar. He is a strong warrior whose goal is to stop the mages. While his name isn't exposed in-game, his name was revealed in "The Fifth Disciple" sequel. Also the main character of the spin-off book Země bez zákona (English: Lawless Country).
- Freghar - A scholar who summoned three heroes to save Rovenland. During the Krow-Kane summoning ritual he died.
- Roland - The group meets him in Goblin Caves where he joins them. He is a thief with a good sense for honor.
- Erik - The son of a librarian joins the group in a library.
- Gralt - A mage who lives alone and avoids people of Rovenland. He joins the group.
- Nimeth - A powerful mage who lives in White Tower. He was the teacher of five mages until they built Skeldal Tower.

== History ==
Gates of Skeldal was developed by Czech studio Napoleon Games for MS-DOS and published by JRC Interactive in 1998.

=== Sequel ===
In 2002 the sequel The Fifth Disciple (Czech:Brány Skeldalu 2: Pátý Učedník, literally: Gates of Skeldal 2: The Fifth Disciple) was released. The story follow the young student of magic Engeor, who has to face Wahargem, one of the main character in original game.

=== Re-releases ===
In 2005 Gates of Skeldal was ported by one of the main developers to Windows. On 19 November 2007 the game was made freeware. In 2008 the source code was released under GPLv3 on a SourceForge repository. As the game has never been officially released in English, it was translated by fans later.

In 2014 Gates of Skeldal was released commercially for IOS and Android. The port was funded on Czech crowdfunding site Startovač. During the crowdfunding campaign, Napoleon Games released an advertising game Skeldal Pexeso. Jindřich Rohlík also worked on a novel retelling the story of the game. He also released a novel, Lawless Country, that follows the character of Wahargem.

=== Sequel ===
Napoleon Games announced in April 2015 that another installment in the Gates of Skeldal series was in development, titled 7 Mages. It was scheduled for a late 2015 release for mobile devices and Microsoft Windows. "7 Mages" was released on 15 March 2016.

== See also ==
- Video games in the Czech Republic
