= Fish Heroes =

2012 video game

- Developer: Craneballs Studio
- Platforms: iOS; Android
- Release: June 21, 2012
- Genre: Arcade video game
- Mode: Single-player

Fish Heroes is a video game developed by Craneballs Studio. It is an Arcade video game similar to that of Angry Birds.

== Plot ==
Shark Mafia is capturing and packaging helpless fishes. Group of Fish Heroes set to sail these fishes from being canned.

== Gameplay ==
Player's task in every level is to kill all shark to reach the goal he uses a slingshot loaded by fishes. Unlike Angry Birds the game has full 3D graphics so player has to rotate the camera to get the best shot on sharks or blocks. The game has over 100 levels spread across four environments.

== Reception ==
The game was well received by critics upon its release. It currently holds 75% on Metacritic and 78.75% on GameRankings.

The game was praised for its control system, significant number of playable levels and high quality visuals. Conversely, the game suffered criticism of the in game physics system.
