= Chameleon Run =

2016 video game

- Developer: Hyperbolic Magnetism
- Publisher: Noodlecake Studios
- Designer: Ján "Split" Ilavský
- Programmer: Ján "Split" Ilavský
- Composer: Ján "Split" Ilavský
- Engine: Unity 3D
- Platforms: Android; iOS; tvOS; Windows Phone; Nintendo Switch; Windows
- Release: 7 April 2016
- Genre: Action
- Mode: Single-player

Chameleon Run is a 2016 action game developed by Hyperbolic Magnetism and published by Noodlecake Studios. It was released for iOS, Android, tvOS, Windows Phone, and Nintendo Switch.

== Development ==
The game was originally created as a Ludum Dare prototype by Ján Ilavsky. Ilavský later decided to remake it into a full-length game when he saw how many clones of Chameleon Run came up on the App Store and Google Play that used his source code.

== Gameplay ==
Chameleon Run is an auto runner and does not require the user to do anything but performing short and long jumps by holding the screen and to allow colour change between two of the same characters. The first is purple and the second is yellow. The player controls a cube-like character that moves to the right and forward direction. The player's task is to help the character get to the end on the white cubic road by jumping over obstacles and pits. The game features an original mechanic in that the player can touch only objects that have the same colour as the character. The player has to switch the character's colour so that the character can move on different platforms. Every level features three tasks: finish the level, collect all coins and crystals, and finish the level without switching colour.

== Reception ==
Reception

Aggregate score
Aggregator	Score
Metacritic	iOS: 85/100

Review score
Publication	Score
TouchArcade	iOS: 4.5/5

Chameleon Run has received generally positive reviews from critics. It holds 85/100 on Metacritic.

Pocket Gamer called Chameleon Run "A fresh and exciting take on the autorunner." It praised its gameplay and its mechanics including the colour-switching mechanic.

TouchArcade praised the colour-switching mechanic and environment that is "full of life." It also praised challenges and visuals.

Chameleon Run is one of winners of Apple Design Awards 2016.

Chameleon Run has sold over 260,000 copies as of 1 July 2016. Sales were 400,000 units as of February 2017.

Chameleon Run is nominated for five Czech Game of the Year Awards. It is nominated in categories Best Game, Best Mobile Game, Best Game Design, Best technological solution and Best Visuals. Winners were announced on 10 February 2016. Chameleon Run won in categories Best mobile game of the year and Best design.

== Port ==
A Nintendo Switch version of the game launched on June 14, 2018. This version is called Chameleon Run: Deluxe Edition and it includes six new levels unique to the Switch and a special fourth objective to complete on each level. The Deluxe Edition was itself later ported to Steam on 29 August 2019.
