= Radiolight =

2025 video game

- Developer: Kryštof Knesl
- Platform: Microsoft Windows
- Release: 23 October 2025
- Genre: Adventure game
- Mode: Single-player

Radiolight is a 2025 adventure video game by Kryštof Knesl.

== Plot ==
The game is set in a fictional American town of Ashwood Creek in the 1980s. Fourteen-year-old scout Elliot Laire has gone missing in a local national park while a rescue party is searching the park. Subsequently, reports suggest that a park ranger Harvey Waters disappears in the park. Officer Ethan Collins is sent to the park to find out what happened to Harvey as others are searching for Elliot. He uses a walkie-talkie to communicate with his chief and friend Robert. He also brings an old radio he was given by his daughter Mia. Strange voices begin to be heard after he enters the park.

== Gameplay ==
Radiolight is a first-person adventure game. The player controls Ethan while exploring a vast national park. He has a radio and a walkie-talkie, through which he communicates with his colleague Rob. Various frequencies can be picked up on the radio, which is necessary to progress further. The game also involves finding items that can be used in specific locations.

== Development ==
Radiolight was developed by a solo developer Kryštof Knesl. Knesl started working on the game during COVID-19 pandemic. His inspirations were Firewatch and Alan Wake. Knesl noted that his vision largely changed during the development and the game he eventually made is very different from the one he started working on. Knesl released demo of the game during 2025 Steam Next Fest which helped the game to gain wider attention. The game was eventually released on 23 October 2025.

== Reception ==
The demo was downloaded by over 10,000 players during the festival and wishlisted by 20,000. Demo scored 97% on Steam.

The game was positively compared to Firewatch. Lyssa Greywood of Screen Hype gave the game 9 points of 10. She praised story and atmosphere. She also noted emotional subtlety and evocative sound stating its exceptional. On the other hand, she criticised length and limited replay value. Cosmin Vasile of Softpedia gave the game 85% calling it "an interesting game great for anyone who enjoys compact, creative and very engaging stories." He praised the story, jump scares and game world. On the other hand, he criticised smaller bugs and length.
