= Skylar & Plux: Adventure on Clover Island =

2017 video game

- Developers: Right Nice Games; Grip Digital
- Publisher: Grip Digital
- Producer: Kevin Martinez
- Designers: Eric Valentine; Leo Toivio; Max Herngren; Marek Zeman
- Programmers: Leo Toivio; Jan Gehr; Patrik Jurašek
- Artists: Jakob Gaveli; Johan Aberg
- Engine: Unreal Engine 4
- Platforms: Microsoft Windows; PlayStation 4; Xbox One
- Release: WW: May 19, 2017
- Genre: Platform
- Mode: Single-player

Skylar & Plux: Adventure on Clover Island is a 3D platform video game by Right Nice Games and Grip Digital. It is inspired by games like Jak and Daxter and Ratchet & Clank. It was scheduled for January 2017 but released on 19 May 2017. By August 2021, it was delisted from all platforms under publisher request, despite Right Nice Games not being notified.

== Gameplay ==
Players control the titular character of Skylar from the third-person perspective. The game is set on the eponymous Clover Island. There are various environments on the island. It includes tropical beaches, volcanic caverns, snowy mountain tops and a merciless desert. Player can collect orange crystals that heals her health. Inhabitants of the island are Lo'a. They were captured by evil CRT and player can free them. When player finds a cage with Lo'a she can free it for required amount of orange crystals. There are multiple gadgets scattered across the world. She gets Mechanical arm in the beginning. It is used to fight CRT's minions and also for grappling hook. There is Jet-pack that allows her to get to higher places. Later she finds Time Orb that can slow time for a short period. In the end she finds an electromagnetic glove that can move metal objects, including enemies and rockets. The player's main task is to find 3 fuse cores that are scattered across the island.

== Plot ==
CRT, an artificial intelligence that wants to dominate the world created Skylar, a warrior cat with mechanical arm but Skylar decides to turn on him and escapes. She gets to Clover Island, where she meets an Owl named Plux who accompanies her on her journey. Together they try to prevent CRT from conquering Clover Island and turning it into a wasteland. They must find 3 fuse cores before CRT. Cores power the Siphon, an ancient Progenitor machine.

== Reception ==
Reception

Aggregate scores
| Aggregator | Score |
|---|---|
| GameRankings | (PC) 75% (PS4) 59.7% (XONE) 59.4% |
| Metacritic | (PC) 69/100 (PS4) 59/100 (XONE) 59/100 |

Review score
| Publication | Score |
|---|---|
| Push Square | 5/10 |

Zing.cz published a review made by 2 journalists. Ondřej Zeman received the game positively, praising the storytelling and gameplay. He also praised the design of the levels and technical execution of the game, but criticized lack of diverse enemies. Filip Němec was more critical. He criticised lack of innovation, and also noted some technical problems with the game. Another critical point was unutilized potential of main characters. Overall the game was scored at 6/10. The review concluded that Skylar and Plux is an above average 3D platformer that will take younger players by its gameplay and story.
