= Redcon (video game) =

2016 video game

REDCON
- Developer: Hexage
- Platforms: Android iOS; Windows Phone; Microsoft Windows; Mac OS X
- Release: 19 April 2016 (iOS, Android); 23 April 2016 (PC)
- Genre: Real-time strategy
- Mode: Single-player

Redcon - Strike Commander (styled as REDCON) is a 2016 real-time strategy video game developed by Hexage. It is inspired by the Japanese anime film Memories - Episode 3 : "CANNON FODDER".

== Gameplay ==
The player controls a fort (later progressing to "Fortress"-type fortifications) armed with cannons. The player's task is to destroy an enemy's fort/fortress without being defeated. Weapons and facilities can be upgraded and configured between battles.

There are numerous weapons and facilities in-game. Most weapons are artillery cannons that fire shells of various sizes and densities, with accuracy based on the accessibility of the target. Some weapons act as launch pads and fire different types of missiles, such as explosive, toxic, and fire, or as silos and fire ICBMs. A few fire energy weapons that use power instead of ammunition, with heightened accuracy. Facilities mainly do passive utility jobs, such as providing defense to the fort/fortress or adding increased accuracy to weapons, although a few do active jobs, such as upgrading soldier weapon type and armor, or activating a sleeper cell in the enemy fortress.

The player also controls soldiers, who are the crew of the fort/fortress. They fulfill many roles, from intelligence officers to pilots to engineers. The soldiers repair damaged friendly structures, destroy enemy structures, and shoot enemy soldiers (red soldiers shoot yellow soldiers, and vice versa) in the same structure as them. Soldiers can also operate machinery and speed up or improve their actions, even though it is not strictly necessary for them to do so (although some facilities require soldiers to operate, such as Clandestine Operations, which requires a designated "Intelligence Officer" to run, or the Charon Impact-Landing ICBM, which needs 1-2 "pilots" to launch). The soldiers can also infiltrate enemy fortifications via airship, sleeper cell, or, memorably, by rocket. Soldiers use six tools during the game, with two upgraded variants. The four most commonly used are the hammer, which repairs structures, the jackhammer, which destroys enemy structures, the telescope, which improves accuracy, and the rifle, which is used in infiltration combat (the rifle can be upgraded into the machine gun variant later in the game). The two less commonly used are the phone (Intelligence Officer, Clandestine Operations) and the Control Room (Engineer, OMEGA Capital Destroyer). The Control Room has a very rare yellow variant (Engineer, Kranz Cannon). There is a seventh tool, known as the "Facility Controls," which is always hidden by the soldiers' back when in use.

== Plot ==
Redcon is set in a world where World War I, referenced to as the "Great Unification War" in-game, never ended and continued for millennia. A dictatoral state simply called the Empire State, led by Fuhrer Adler Grimm, fights a war against a rebel nation named Krux (claimed by the Fuhrer to be the only remaining nation resisting unification), led by the traitorous Master General and former mentor to the player, Franz Erhard Kranz(later into the game, it is revealed that Kranz and Grimm used to be allies, if not close friends). The protagonist of the game is Strike Commander (full name "Strike Commander Triumphant"), who is tasked with leading the offensive against Krux.

Strike Commander is given command over a small fort in a war against Krux. He proves to be a capable tactician and defeats Krux forces in several battles. He eventually defeats Krux units that tried to destroy a dam that would flood the gambling town of Pompey and wipe out the Empire State's General Staff (equivalent of the Cabinet of the United States) along with Fuhrer Adler Grimm, which would effectively end the war. Strike Commander leads an offensive against Krux even though general Kranz warns him that they are not enemies and mocks him for his naivety to trust the Empire State. After a long campaign, Strike Commander Triumphant defeats the Krux army and kills Kranz. Fuhrer Grimm congratulates him on his victory but says that the Empire State needs an enemy, since war is profitable for the Empire State and unifies the people, and labels Strike Commander as a traitor. Strike Commander's executive officer Lieutenant Bella Warren joins Grimm, although Strike Commander's Field Sergeant attempts to defect to the Strike Commander's side. Strike Commander succeeds Kranz as leader of the Krux, even adopting his flag (a black "X" on a blue background), and starts a counteroffensive against the Empire State. He defeats all Imperial generals in the General Staff. Adler Grimm celebrates the death of his "idiotic generals" and takes Bella to Pompey. Once he leaves, Bella hints that she abandoned the Strike Commander to spy on the Fuhrer. The Strike Commander then prepares to destroy the dam that would flood Pompey and kill Grimm the same way Kranz tried in the beginning of the game. The ending of the game is ambiguous. The closing text suggests that either Strike Commander Triumphant is successful in ending the perpetual war at the potential cost of endless prosperity, or that they fail as Kranz did and the cycle of war will continue.

== Reception ==
Redcon has received generally positive reviews from Players. Rob Rich of Gamezebo gave Redcon 4 out of 5 in his review. He praised the game for its visual style and gameplay. Rich likened the game to FTL: Faster Than Light. He criticised lack of tutorial for some features and "lackluster default base layout." Thomas Olson praised the game for its gameplay that gives more challenge than what would be expected from mobile game. He criticised that graphics in Pc version should be more polished. He also praised amount of content that include over 100 missions.

Steve Lichtfield reviewed the Windows Phone version of the game. He praised it, written that he has "never seen such superlative animation and atmosphere in a mobile game." He also praised the gameplay but criticized that "the back story was confusing."
