= Afterglitch =

2022 video game

- Developer: Hangonit
- Publisher: Hangonit Studio
- Designer: Vladimír Kudělka
- Engine: Unity
- Platforms: Microsoft Windows, OS X, Linux, Xbox One, Xbox Series X and Series S
- Release: 9 December 2022
- Genres: Art, adventure
- Mode: Single-player

Afterglitch is an adventure game developed by Hangonit. It is an experimental science fiction game.

== Development ==
The game was developed by Vladimír Kudělka who worked on it for almost 7 years. He was inspired by paintings by Zdeněk Burian, Salvador Dalí and books on quantum physics. The initial impulse for development was Zdenek Burian's illustration for the short story "Friends from Hadonoš" showing a small astronaut standing in front of a mass into which another figure is diving. The game visually references Salvador Dalí's work "Corpus hypercubus" which depicts Jesus Christ crucified on a tesseract or hypercube network. The game was announced in September 2021 and released on 9 December 2022.

== Gameplay ==
Player controls an astronaut on his multidimensional journey for an alien civilization. Player can just walk with his character. The game doesn't allow them to do anything else. Player's task is to figure out which way to go to progress to the next level.

== Reception ==
Afterglitch was nominated for the Nuovo Award and Excellence in Visual Art at 2023 Independent Games Festival.
