= Toby: The Secret Mine =

2015 video game

- Developer: Lukáš Navrátil
- Designer: Lukáš Navrátil
- Composer: Matthew Steed
- Engine: Unity
- Platforms: Windows, Linux, OS X, iOS, Android, Xbox One, Wii U, PlayStation 4, Nintendo Switch
- Release: Windows, Linux: WW: October 20, 2015; Android, iOS: WW: April 14, 2016; Wii U: NA: January 19, 2017; PAL: January 19, 2017; Xbox One: WW: January 20, 2017; PlayStation 4: WW: July 6, 2017; Switch: NA: July 24, 2018; PAL: August 9, 2018
- Genre: Puzzle-platform
- Mode: Single-player

Toby: The Secret Mine is a 2015 puzzle-platform game developed by Lukáš Navrátil. It resembles Limbo.

== Gameplay ==
Toby: The Secret Mine is a side-scrolling puzzle platformer with black silhouette graphics. The gameplay is very similar to Limbo but its atmosphere is much less dark and world is much more colorful. The player controls Toby throughout the game, guiding him through multiple levels set in varied environments such as forests, caves, a mine, blizzard etc. There are puzzles on the route that the player must solve to progress. There are also multiple traps that the player can easily overlook unless alert. These traps vary in each environment with the blizzard levels focussing heavily on timed platforming. There are also kidnapped friends that are hidden throughout the levels adding an element of exploration. The game consists of 21 separate levels in all.

== Plot ==
Toby lives in a nameless town whose residents are being kidnapped by a red-eyed cats. Toby decides set up for an adventurous journey to save his friends.

Toby pursues gets through a Lost Mine full of dangers and traps set by kidnappers. Toby eventually gets to hideout of kidnappers and defeats their leader. The leader offers Toby his crown and player is given choice to accept the crown or kill the kidnapper.

If he takes the crown, Toby's eyes turn red and Toby becomes the new leader of kidnappers. His friends turn evil too and Toby is seen standing on a cliff as his homeworld is burning.

If Toby kills the kidnapper, his friends are freed and they return home.

== Development ==
The game was in development for one and a half years. It was inspired by Limbo, Nihilumbra, Type:Rider and other games. Navrátil worked on the game alone. He had to deal with the difficulty of his lack of experience. He eventually finished the game and in October 2015 it was released on Steam via Steam Greenlight. An iOS version is currently planned. The Nintendo Switch version will be released in Japan on July 9, 2020.

== Reception ==
Gone With the Win was critical of the similarities between Toby: The Secret Mine and Limbo but praised its charm and gameplay. It also criticised the guesswork required in the puzzles but gave the game a positive review overall with a 7/10.
