= Lums: The Game of Light and Shadows =

2013 video game

- Developer: Hyperbolic Magnetism
- Designer: Ján Ilavský
- Programmer: Vladimír Hrinčár
- Platforms: iOS, Android
- Release: iOS; 23 July 2013; Android; 2014
- Genre: Action Puzzle video game
- Mode: Single-player

Lums: The Game of Light and Shadows (or simply Lums) is an indie video game released in 2013. It was developed by Prague-based studio Hyperbolic Magnetism. The game is currently available only for iOS but an Android version was in development and release in 2014.

== Development ==
Development for the game took two years for a two-person team, Vladimír Hrinčár and Ján Ilavský. The game was finished and released in July 2013. It was supported by Apple who even advertised it on the App Store site. The game was bought by 13,000 people and downloaded for free by another 130,000 people. The Android version was scheduled for 2014.

== Plot ==
The world of Lums has been invaded by Vampires. The only way to defeat them is to expose them to Light.

== Gameplay ==
The game features gameplay similar to Angry Birds. Players area tasked to get vampires out of shadows so they can be killed by light. To do it they use 5 types of Lums. Instead of just shooting Lums players have to direct their movement. It is also possible to use a nuclear weapon to kill vampires, however there is only one weapon for free in the game with an in-app purchase to buy more. There are 3 stars to achieve in every level with each stars opening new levels.

== Reception ==
Reception

Aggregate score
Aggregator	Score
Metacritic	80/100

Review scores
Publication	Score
Pocket Gamer	4/5
TouchArcade	4.5/5
National Post	7/10

The game received generally positive reviews from critics. It was praised for its originality, gameplay and graphics.

Lums also won Czech Game of 2013 Award for the Artistic Contribution to Czech Video Game Creation.
