= 7 Mages =

2016 video game

- Developer: Napoleon Games
- Publisher: Napoleon Games
- Writer: Jindřich Skeldal
- Series: Gates of Skeldal
- Engine: Unity
- Platforms: Windows; Android; iOS; OS X; Linux
- Release: 23 June 2016
- Genre: Role-playing
- Mode: Single player

7 Mages (Czech: Brány Skeldalu: 7 Mágů, translated as Gates of Skeldal: 7 Mages) is a 2016 role-playing video game developed by Napoleon Games as the third installment in the Gates of Skeldal series. 7 Mages is a tactical, turn-based game that focuses on musical magic. Each playable character possesses a tune that they can play to directly affect anyone within earshot.

The story is an adaptation of Akira Kurosawa's benchmark film, Seven Samurai.

== Gameplay ==
7 Mages is a dungeon crawler that features gameplay similar to the original Gates of Skeldal. The player moves squares in real-time, but battles are turn-based. Each mage has some specialization, such as being a warrior or archer.

There are multiple types of magic, such as elemental magic and musical magic. Musical magic uses instruments, and its effect weakens with larger distances. Magic can heal, refill mana, resurrect dead companions, etc.

== Reception ==
7 Mages' iOS version received universal acclaim, holding a 90% score at Metacritic.

TouchArcade praised the gameplay. The reviewer praised its puzzles, although "its approach is probably not going to gel with everyone." Other positive comments were given on the combat system and dungeon design. The story was also noted to be a weaker part of the game.

7 Mages won the Czech Game of the Year Award for the Best story.
