= Reaper: Tale of a Pale Swordsman =

2013 video game

- Developer: Hexage
- Platforms: Android; IOS; Windows Phone; Windows; Mac OS X BlackBerry 10; OUYA
- Release: 9 September 2013
- Genre: Action role-playing game
- Mode: Single-player

Reaper: Tale of a Pale Swordsman is a video game developed by Czech-based studio Hexage. It is an action role-playing game. In January 2014 the game was Greenlit for Steam.

== Gameplay ==
The player controls a black swordsman and travels across the map from mission point to mission point. Upon arriving, dialog is displayed and the player can choose their own responses. The player can either accept or reject a quest, or on completion of a quest can demand more gold at the risk of losing any future quests from that location. When the quest is accepted a way point is highlighted and the player can choose to go there immediately or undertake a side quest. Once either the way point, or the side quest, is reached the player enters a 2D battle arena mode which is played as a fighting platform game. Enemies in battle include both ground units and flying ones and upon being attacked grant the player 'rage skulls' for special attacks. Once killed they usually drop gold which can be used to buy better weapons and armor. Each battle fought, whether won or lost, grants experience (one exception being some boss battles) which the player uses to level up. Upon leveling, the player can choose 1 of 3 destiny cards which upgrade their character. Cards do everything from granting more health or strength to allowing the player to heal when they collect gold. Cards can also be bought for 20,000 gold at the fortune teller. Random encounters are common as the player heads from one way point to the next which again makes the player enter the battle arena. The controls are very basic, the player automatically attacks when he is near an enemy while the basic swipe commands execute special attacks which can be increased in strength using 'rage skulls'.

== Story ==
A long time ago, hundreds of tribes inhabit the wilderness, one of them with an unknown name has very poor magic and splits into the Torken and Koko. The Koko have no magic while the Torken have very poor magic. The Koko leave, adopt mechanics and technology to compensate for their lack of magic, and become the Imperium. The Torken become great warriors and continue to live on. The pale swordsman has awoken from his long slumber in a mysterious cave. Upon awakening he emerges into a mysterious and magical Wilderness fraught with war and intrigue. He meets and befriends Old Grey Beard. He goes on multiple quests from members of magical native tribes living in Wilderness but also from the mighty Imperium soldiers. He makes new friends on his journey including a young imperium soldier and an outcast woman that fall in love with each other or a commander of imperium fortress. Later he encounters demons who try to overtake the Wilderness. Together with Old Grey they try to find out where they come from. As the swordsman completes his tasks he loses friends who die because of him. He later finds out that the demons awoke because of him and they will destroy the whole Wilderness if he doesn't stop them. The only way to do so is to kill the demon god Iraess. The swordsman encounters Iraess and after long fight he kills him. After the battle he returns to Old Grey who is mortally injured by imperium soldiers. As Grey dies he tells the swordsman that everybody including tribes and imperium go to war and they are saved by him. The game leaves Swordsman freed from his duties as he is wandering in night alone and without purpose feeling cold in his soulless heart.

== Reception ==
The game received generally positive reviews upon its release. Critics praised the game for its graphics, fighting parts and sounds. The story was praised by some critics but a review on Mobilenet.cz found the storyline uninteresting. According to another server Gamewoof the storyline is lacking a bit but still humorous. The game was also criticised for its controls on some devices. Another praise was gained for its price. Jason Stengren, reviewer for AndroidShock rated Reaper 4/5 and stated: "Reaper is an action/RPG that sports attractive visuals and a wide variety of quests aimed at constantly improving your character."
