= WarFriends =

2017 video game

- Developer: About Fun
- Publisher: EA Chillingo
- Engine: Unity
- Platforms: Android iOS
- Release: 17 January 2017
- Genre: Third-person shooter
- Modes: Single-player, multiplayer

WarFriends is a 2017 third-person shooter video game developed by About Fun. It is played by third-person perspective with elements of real-time strategy. It was originally released on 7 October 2016 as early access. The full version was released on 17 January 2017.

As of 5 April 2017, Warfriends was downloaded by more than 5 million users.

== Gameplay ==
The player controls a soldier who can move between multiple covers on the map. The player has to kill a live opponent, or in a certain game mode, AI opponents. The player has access to an arsenal of weapons, including explosives, handguns, special weapons, and a primary weapon. Guns can be fired by tapping and/or holding and dragging. Energy is earned from killed opponents, both AI and live. This energy can be used to deploy supporting units, alike for the player's opponent.

== Reception ==
WarFriends has a score of 73% on review aggregator site Metacritic.
