= Hexage =

Czech video game developer

- Type: Video game developer
- Industry: Video games
- Founded: 2009
- Headquarters: Mníšek pod Brdy, Czech Republic
- Number of employees: 5 (2012)
- Website: www.hexage.net

Hexage is a Czech video game developer, based in Mníšek pod Brdy and registered in the United Kingdom. The company has produced multiple titles for mobile devices. A few of studio's games have surpassed a million downloads. The most successful title is Reaper: Tale of a Pale Swordsman.

The company was founded in 2009. It originally focused on mobile devices but in 2013 the company released its games for Windows. Reaper: Tale of a Pale Swordsman even became available on Steam as it succeeded on Steam Greenlight. The company also tried to release Radiant Defense on Steam before, and it got released as well.

Even though the company is based in the Czech Republic, it built an image of a British company, since in 2009 it was impossible to release video games from the Czech Republic on Google Play. The company develops its games with its own devices. The soundtracks for all the games are by Kubatko.

== Games ==
All games by Hexage
Title	Year	Platform(s)	Genre	Description
Buka	2009	Android, IOS, Windows Phone	Shoot 'em up	
Totemo	2009	Android, IOS, Windows Phone, Windows, OS X	Puzzle video game	
Radiant	2009	Android, IOS, Windows Phone, Windows, OS X	Shoot 'em up	
Everlands	2010	Android, IOS, Windows Phone, Windows, OS X	Turn-based strategy	
Evac	2010	Android, BlackBerry 10, IOS, Windows Phone, Windows, OS X	Maze game	A Pac-Man clone.
Robotek	2011	Android, IOS, Windows Phone, Windows, OS X	Action Turn-based strategy	
Radiant Defense	2012	Android, IOS, Windows Phone, Windows, OS X, webOS	Tower defense	A sequel to Radiant.
Reaper: Tale of a Pale Swordsman	2013	Android, IOS, Windows Phone, Windows, OS X, BlackBerry 10, Ouya	Action role-playing game	The first title by Hexage that is available on Steam.
REDCON	2016	Android, Windows	Realtime strategy game	
Ritual: Sorcerer Angel	2019	Android, IOS, Windows	Role-playing game	
Flying Tank	2023	Android, IOS, Windows, OS X, Nintendo Switch	Role-playing game	
