= Rememoried =

2015 video game

- Developer: Hangonit
- Designer: Vladimír Kudělka
- Engine: Unity
- Platforms: Microsoft Windows, OS X, Linux
- Release: 31 August 2015
- Genres: Art, adventure, platform
- Mode: Single-player

Rememoried is an art game developed by Hangonit. It is a surrealist explorative game inspired by titles such as Dear Esther and Proteus. The game was released 31 August 2015.

== Development ==
The game was developed by Hangonit, the one-man studio of Vladimír Kudělka. He came up with the idea for the game during his studies at Technical University of Brno. At the time he got impressed by games like Proteus and Dear Esther. He decided to make a similar game after studies. He intended to push the boundaries of the so-called "walking simulators". He planned to create a small game in three months. In the end he decided for a larger game and the development took two years.

The game was greenlighted in July 2015 and released on Steam on 31 August 2015.

== Gameplay ==
The second level of the game. The player has to get to the tree by jumping on rocks that change position when the player looks away from them.

The game is 3D first-person adventure game. It is set in dream world that player explores. The player has to use the ability to "forget" they want to progress. This ability means that certain objects in the game change when player is looking a to a different direction or if they leave the area. If player fails a level they are relegated to the previous lower level.

== Reception ==
Reception

Aggregate score
Aggregator	Score
Metacritic	65/100

Czech servers Hrej.cz and Zing.cz praised "breathtaking" visuals and soundtrack even though Zing noted that there are some annoying visual effects. Both reviews also praised originality of the gameplay represented by the "forgetting" feature. Reviews on the other hand criticised punishing player for failing by returning him to the previous level which can make the game frustrating and make him lose interest in the game.

French server Jeux Video praised the game for its atmosphere and also for gameplay that is very simple but smart. Another point of praise were visuals and beautiful graphics. Returning player to the previous level when failing was criticised and called "the worst idea of century". The conclusion of the review was positive noting a great story and engaging world.

Jackson Ingram called Rememoried "the closest thing to a waking dream you’ll ever have". He also called the Rememoried visuals to be "stunning".

Rememoried has won Czech Game of 2015 Award for the Artistic Contribution to Czech Video Game Creation.
