= Matos (surname) =

Matos or Mattos, sometimes de Matos or de Mattos, is a Sephardic and Portuguese language surname.

The origin of the surname Matos or Mattos is toponymic. It was taken from a place with this designation, in the region of Lamego in Portugal. It originates in Egas Hermigues, great-grandson of King Ramiro II, from the Kingdom of León. Egas was of great valour and had the nickname of the "Bravo." He founded the convent of Freixo and made Mattos Farmhouse. His son and heir Hermigio Pais de Mattos followed the lineage. There are documents of Paio Hermigues de Mattos, contemporary of Kings Sancho II and Alfonso III of Portugal. Hermigio de Mattos was the owner of that farm and had others for honor. It is also a surname used by many Sephardic Jewish and converso families. "Matos" is a word in Hebrew that means "tribes", or in the more literal form, "wooden sticks". Francisca Nuñez de Carabajal, a Crypto-Jewish burned at stake in Mexico City by the Holy Office was condemned along her Crypto-Jewish husband, Francisco Rodríguez de Matos.

Notable people with the name include:

== Matos ==
- Adolfo Matos (born 1950), Puerto Rican activist
- Agberto Matos (1972–2026), Brazilian handball player
- Alberto Matos (1944–2021), Portuguese sprinter
- Alessandro de Matos (born 1980), Brazilian boxer
- Alex Matos (born 2004), English footballer
- Alexandre Matos (born 1995), Macanese footballer
- Ana Paula Matos (born 1977), Brazilian politician
- Andre Matos (1971–2019), Brazilian singer and musician
- Andreu Matos (born 1995), Andorran footballer
- Ángel Luis Ríos Matos (born 1956), Roman Catholic clergyman
- Ángel Matos (born 1976), Cuban taekwondo practitioner
- Angel Matos García (born 1901), Puerto Rican politician
- Antonia Matos (1902–1994), Guatemalan painter
- Bayron Matos (born 2000), Dominican-American football player
- Bobby Matos (1941–2017), American jazz musician
- Bruno Matos (born 1990), Brazilian footballer
- Cainan de Matos (born 1990), Italian futsal player
- Carlo Matos, Portuguese-American writer
- Celeste Jaguaribe de Matos Faria (1873–1938), Brazilian composer, poet and singer
- Celso de Matos (born 1947), Portuguese footballer
- César de Matos (born 1902), Portuguese footballer
- Conceição Matos (born 1936), Portuguese communist and political prisoner
- Dani Matos (born 1983), Portuguese footballer
- Daverson Matos (born 1993), Brazilian politician
- Diego Matos (born 1997), Brazilian footballer
- Dina Matos (born 1966), Former First Lady of New Jersey
- Diogo Matos (born 1975), Portuguese footballer
- Diomedes Matos, American musician
- Eddie Matos (actor) (born 1978), Puerto Rican actor
- Eduardo Matos Moctezuma (born 1940), Mexican archaeologist
- Elisabete Matos (born 1964), Portuguese singer, artistic director and politician
- Eloy Matos (born 1985), Puerto Rican footballer
- Érica Matos (born 1983), Brazilian boxer
- Eusébio de Matos (1629–1692), Portuguese orator, religious and painter
- Félix V. Matos Rodríguez (born 1962), American academic administrator
- Fernando Matos (born 1941), Portuguese judoka
- Filipe Matos (born 1992), Portuguese actor
- Francisco Matos (born 1969), Dominican baseball player
- Francisco Matos Paoli (1915–2000), Puerto Rican writer and independence advocate
- Francisco Vieira de Matos (1699–1783), Portuguese painter, known as Vieira Lusitano
- Gabriela de Matos (born 1988), Brazilian architect
- Gerardo Matos Rodríguez (1897–1948), Musical artist
- Glória de Matos (1936–2025), Portuguese actress
- Gregório de Matos (1636–1696), Portuguese poet and lawyer
- Guilherme Matos (born 1994), Portuguese footballer
- Horácio de Matos (1882–1931), Brazilian politician and colonel
- Huber Matos (1918–2014), Cuban military leader and dissident activist
- Ian Matos (1989–2021), Brazilian diver
- Isabel Freire de Matos (1915–2004), Puerto Rican activist and writer
- Israel Matos Gil (born 1982), Spanish tennis player
- João de Matos (1955–2017), Angolan military general
- João de Oliveira Matos Ferreira (1879–1962), Portuguese priest
- João Matos (born 1987), Portuguese futsal player
- João Matos Cunha (born 2007), Brazilian para athlete
- João Pedro Matos Fernandes (born 1967), Portuguese politician
- João Uva de Matos Proença (1938–1990), Portuguese diplomat
- John Matos (born 1961), American graffiti artist
- José Joaquín Matos (born 1995), Spanish footballer
- José Luis de Matos, Angolan politician
- José Norton de Matos (1867–1955), Portuguese general and politician
- José Ruíz Matos (1966–1997), Puerto Rican boxer
- Joseph Matos, U.S. Marine Corps general
- Josué Matos (born 1978), Puerto Rican baseball player
- Juan Borges Matos (born 1966), Cuban chess grandmaster
- Juan Damián Matos (born 1963), Spanish Paralympic judoka
- Juan de Matos Fragoso (1608–1689), Spanish dramatist
- Julius Matos (born 1974), American baseball player
- Kica Matos (born 1966), Puerto Rican lawyer
- Kiko Matos (born 1990), Filipino-Portuguese actor
- Léo Matos (born 1986), Brazilian footballer
- Lúcia Almeida Matos (born 1955), Art professor in Portugal
- Luis Matos (baseball, born 1978) (born 1978), Puerto Rican baseball player
- Luis Matos (baseball, born 2002) (born 2002), Venezuelan baseball player
- Luís de Matos (born 1970), Portuguese magician
- Luís de Matos Monteiro da Fonseca (born 1944), Cape Verdean diplomat and civil servant
- Luís Norton de Matos (born 1953), Portuguese footballer and manager
- Luis Palés Matos (1898–1959), Puerto Rican writer
- Manny Matos (footballer), Portuguese-American soccer player and coach
- Manny Matos (soccer) (born 1953), American soccer player
- Manuel Antonio Matos (1847–1929), Venezuelan politician
- Manuel Vieira de Matos (1861–1932), Portuguese Bishop
- Márcio Matos (born 1946), Brazilian physician and politician
- Margarida Matos Rosa, Portuguese economist and leader
- Maria Matos (1886–1952), Portuguese actress and theatre personality
- Maria Matos Priolli (1915–2000), Brazilian music educator and composer
- Mário Matos (born 1988), Portuguese footballer
- Mauro Matos (born 1982), Argentine footballer
- Mayra Matos (born 1988), Puerto Rican model and beauty pageant titleholder
- Miguel Costa Matos (born 1994), Portuguese politician
- Milán Matos (1949–2018), Cuban long jumper
- Osiris Matos (born 1984), Dominican baseball player
- Pascual Matos (born 1974), Dominican baseball player
- Paulo Matos (born 1984), Brazilian footballer
- Paulo Roberto de Souza Matos (1944–2023), Brazilian politician
- Pedro Matos (born 1997), Portuguese footballer
- Pedro Matos (footballer, born 1998) (born 1998), Portuguese professional footballer
- Pio Matos (born 1990), Mozambican basketball player
- Rafael Hernández Matos (1902–1996), Puerto Rican jurist
- Rafael Matos (born 1996), Brazilian tennis player
- Raphael Matos (born 1981), Brazilian open-wheel racing driver
- Ricardo Matos (footballer, born 1979), Portuguese footballer
- Ricardo Matos (footballer, born 2000), Portuguese footballer
- Ryder Matos (born 1993), Brazilian footballer
- Sabina Matos (born 1974), American politician
- Sara Matos (born 1989), Portuguese actress and model
- Sebastián Matos (born 1984), Argentine footballer
- Silvia Matos (born 1988), Spanish businesswoman, and transgender rights activist
- Sofia Matos (born 1990), Portuguese politician
- Sorangel Matos (born 1984), Miss Universe contestant
- Thadeu Matos, Brazilian actor and singer
- Tiago Matos (born 2001), Portuguese footballer
- Tito Matos (1968–2022), Puerto Rican percussionist
- Valentina Matos (born 2000), Spanish figure skater
- Vasco Matos (born 1980), Portuguese footballer
- Vítor Matos (born 1988), Portuguese football manager
- Yasniel Matos (born 2002), Cuban footballer
- Zara Matos (born 2006), Macau footballer

== Mattos ==
- Bobby Mattos (born 1972) Peruvian engineer and politician, Mayor of San Martín de Porres (2014–2018)
- Alexander Teixeira de Mattos (1865–1921), Dutch-English journalist, literary critic and publisher
- André Mattos (born 1961), Brazilian actor
- Bob Mattos (1941–2010), American football player and coach
- Carlos de Meira Mattos (1913–2007), Brazilian general
- Chris Mattos, American politician
- Edwin Teixeira de Mattos (1898–1976), Dutch bobsledder
- Fernando Mattos Costa (born 1958), Uruguayan politician and businessman
- Gabriel Mattos, Brazilian tennis player
- George Mattos (1929–2012), American pole vaulter
- Grant Mattos (born 1981), American football player
- Gregório de Mattos (1636–1696), Brazilian writer
- Harry Mattos (1911–1992), American football player
- Henri Teixeira de Mattos (1856–1908), Dutch painter
- Henrique Mattos (born 1990), Brazilian footballer
- Isaac Eduard Teixeira de Mattos (1832–1885), founder of the Teixeira de Mattos Bank
- Isabel de Mattos Dillon (1861–1920), Brazilian suffragist
- Jim Mattos (1932–2020), American politician
- José Leonardo de Oliveira Mattos, Soft redirect to Wikispecies
- Joseph Teixeira de Mattos (1892–1971), Dutch painter
- Julio Mattos (born 1940), Argentine footballer
- Katharine de Mattos (1851–1939), Scottish author and journalist
- Killara Mattos (born 1992), Brazilian volleyball player
- Lídia Mattos (1924–2013), Brazilian actress
- Marcelo Mattos (born 1984), Brazilian footballer (born in 1984)
- Marcelo Roberto Lima de Mattos (born 1986), Brazilian football midfielder
- Marco Antonio de Mattos Filho (born 1986), Brazilian football midfielder
- Marcos Renan de Mattos Ceschin (born 1985), Brazilian football midfielder
- Monica Mattos (born 1983), Brazilian former pornographic actress, director, dancer and television
- Samuel Mattos (born 1933), Brazilian footballer
- Tomás de Mattos (1947–2016), Uruguayan writer
- W. S. De Mattos (born 1851), British socialist activist
- Wilfredo Mattos Cintrón (born 1945), Puerto Rican author and educator

== See also ==
- Matos (disambiguation)
