= De Mattos =

de Mattos, de Matos, sometimes Mattos, or Matos, is a Sephardic and Portuguese language surname.

The origin of the surname de Mattos is toponymic. It was taken from a place with this designation, in the region of Lamego in Portugal. It originates in Egas Hermigues, great-grandson of King Ramiro II, from the Kingdom of León. Egas was of great valour and had the nickname of the "Bravo." He founded the convent of Freixo and made Mattos Farmhouse. His son and heir Hermandio Pais de Mattos followed the lineage. There are documents of Paio Hermigues de Mattos, contemporary of Kings Sancho II and Alfonso III of Portugal. Hermigio de Mattos was the owner of that farm and had others for honor. It is also a surname used by many Sephardic Jewish and converso families. "Matos" is a word in Hebrew that means "tribes", or in the more literal form, "wooden sticks". Francisca Nuñez de Carabajal, a crypto-Jew burned at stake in Mexico City by the Holy Office was condemned along her crypto-Jew husband, Francisco Rodríguez de Matos.

de Mattos may refer to:

People with the surname de Mattos:

- Katharine de Mattos (1851–1939), Scottish author

Henri Teixeira de Mattos

- Alexander Teixeira de Mattos (1865–1921), journalist, literary critic and publisher
- Gregório de Mattos (1636–1696), Brazilian writer
- Marcelo Roberto Lima de Mattos (born 1986), Brazilian football midfielder
- Marcelo Mendonça de Mattos, (born 1984), Brazilian football midfielder
- Marco Antonio de Mattos Filho (born 1986), Brazilian football midfielder
- Marcos Renan de Mattos Ceschin (born 1985), Brazilian football midfielder

== See also ==
- Matos (surname)
