= Mato =

Mato may refer to:

== People ==
- Ana Mato (born 1959), Spanish politician
- Jakup Mato (1934–2005), Albanian publicist
- Mato Miloš (born 1993), Croatian footballer
- Mato Neretljak (born 1979), Croatian footballer
- Mato Valtonen (born 1955), Finnish actor
- Mato, illustrator for the manga series Pokémon Adventures

== Places ==
- Mato, a parish of Ponte de Lima, Portugal
- Matorral, Portuguese scrublands formed on Cambrian schists
- Mato Grosso, a state in western Brazil
- Mato Grosso do Sul, a state in western Brazil
- Mato Paha, the Lakotaname for Bear Butte, South Dakota

== Other uses ==
- MAŤO, the Slovak 8-bit personal computer
- Matō, the surname of several characters in the visual novel Fate/stay night
- Matō Station, a railway station in Nikkō, Tochigi Prefecture, Japan
- Mató, a Catalan cheese
- Mato music, a Music of French Guiana
- Mato language, Austronesian language of Papua New Guinea

== See also ==
- Matos (disambiguation)
- Matos (surname)
