= Calvão =

Calvão may refer to:

- Calvão (Vagos), in Vagos Municipality, Portugal
- Calvão (Chaves), in Chaves Municipality, Portugal
