= Matos =

Matos or Mattos may refer to:

== Places ==
- Salir de Matos, a parish in the municipality of Caldas da Rainha, Portugal
- Matos River, a river in Bolivia
- Matos Costa, a municipality in the Brazilian state of Santa Catarina

== Other uses ==
- Matos (surname), a Portuguese surname
- Matoš, a Croatian surname
- Matot or matos or (Hebrew מטות), the 42nd weekly parshah in the cycle of Torah reading
- Matorral or mato, the scrublands, or heaths, of Portugal

== See also ==
- Mata (disambiguation)
- Matus
- Mato (disambiguation)
- Matto (disambiguation)
