= MAŤO =

8-bit personal computer

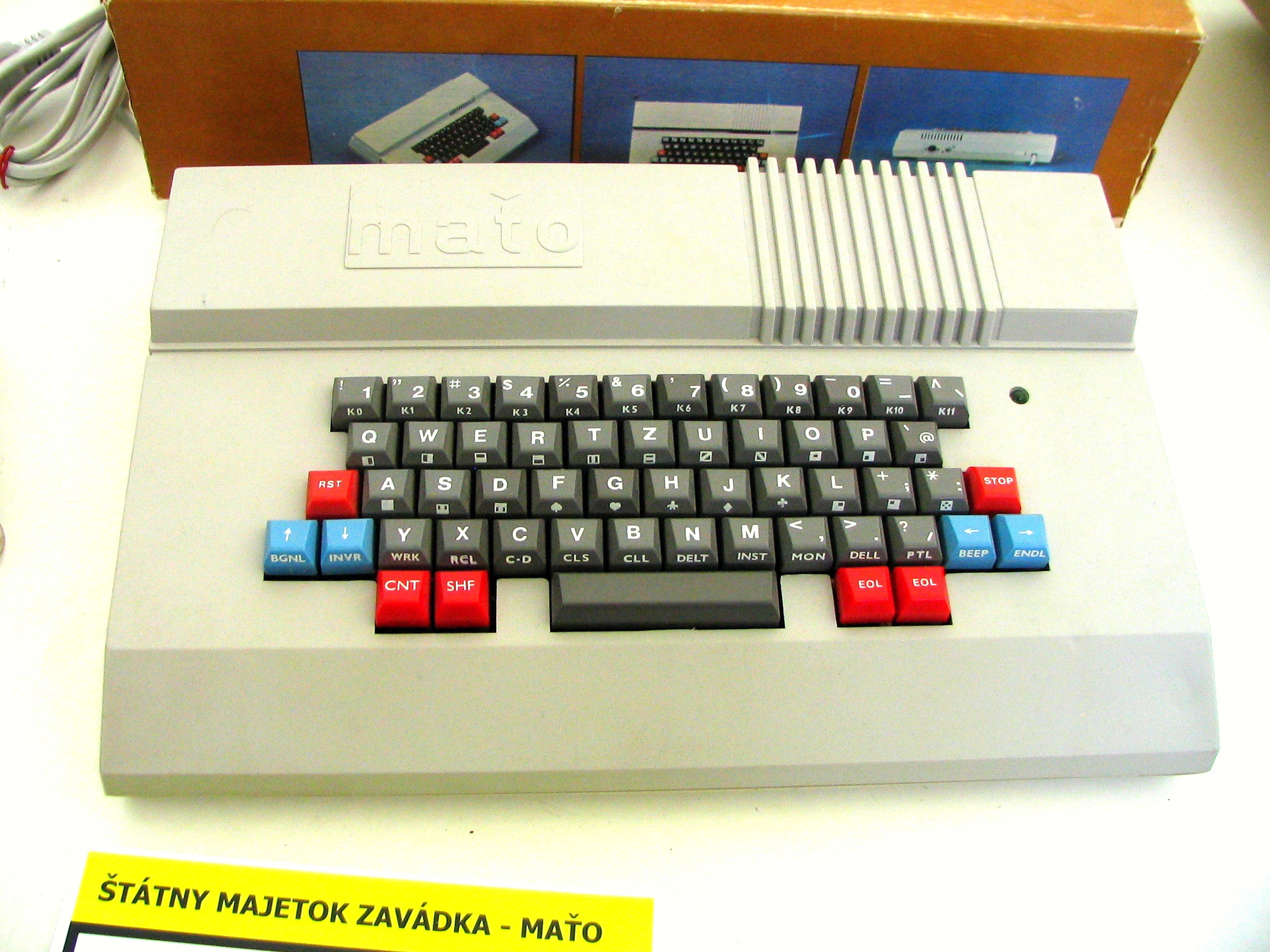
- Maťo computer
- Manufacturer: Štátny majetok Závadka š.p., Závadka nad Hronom
- Type: Personal computer, self-assembly kit
- Released: 1989; 37 years ago
- Discontinued: 1992; 34 years ago
- Operating system: System monitor, BASIC-G
- CPU: MHB8080A @ 2.048 MHz
- Memory: 48 KiB RWM, 16 KiB ROM
- Display: TV monochrome output; 288×256 resolution;

The Maťo (Matthew) was an 8-bit personal computer produced in the former Czechoslovakia by Štátny majetok Závadka š.p., Závadka nad Hronom, from 1989 to 1992. Their primary goal was to produce a personal computer as cheaply as possible, and therefore it was also sold as a self-assembly kit. It was basically a modified PMD 85, but without backward compatibility. This, combined with its late arrival to the market, made the MAŤO a commercial failure.

== Specifications ==
- MHB 8080A 2.048 MHz CPU
- 48 KB RAM
- 16 KB ROM
- System monitor and built-in BASIC-G or simple games
- Tape recorder interface
- Monochromatic TV output
- 288×256 resolution
- Built-in power supply

== See also ==
- PMD 85
- Tesla (Czechoslovak company)
- IQ 151
- Didaktik
