= PMD 85 =

Personal computer

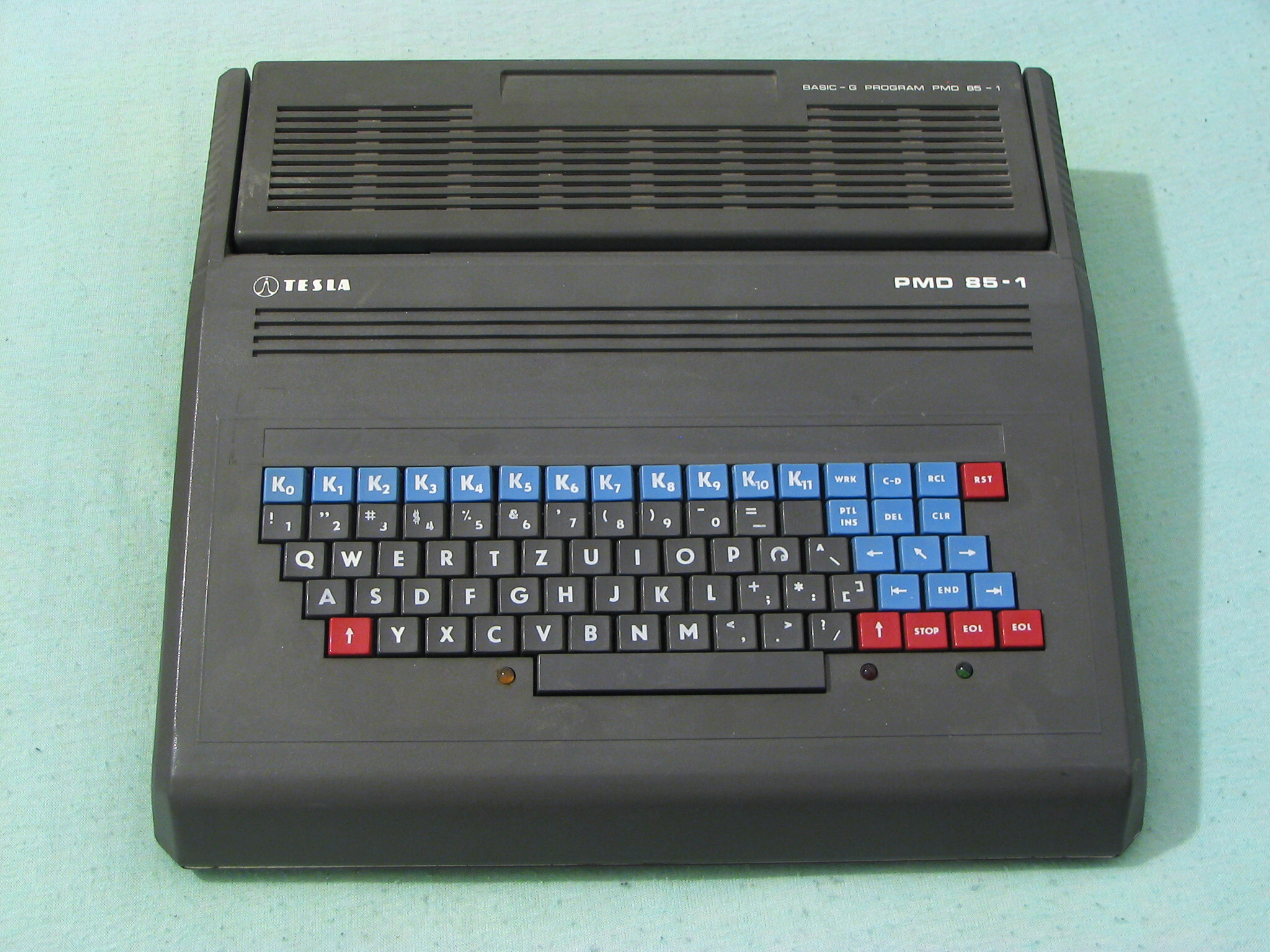
- PMD 85-1
- Manufacturer: Tesla Piešťany
- Type: Personal computer
- Released: 1985; 41 years ago
- Operating system: BASIC
- CPU: MHB8080A @ 2.048 MHz
- Memory: 48 KB RWM, 4 KB ROM
- Display: TV output or RGB component video; 288×256 resolution; 4-level attribute selectable per 6-pixel-wide areas
- Related: MAŤO, Didaktik Alfa and Beta, Consul 2717

The PMD 85 is an 8-bit personal computer produced since 1985 by the companies Tesla Piešťany and Tesla Bratislava in the former Czechoslovakia.

The production was local, due to a lack of foreign currency for purchasing systems from the West.

They were deployed en masse in schools throughout Slovakia, while the IQ 151 performed a similar role in the Czech part of the country. The first Czechoslovak video games were created on the PMD 85 (other platforms were ZX Spectrum and Atari).

Several variants were developed (PMD 85-0, PMD 85, PMD 85-2, PMD 85-2A, PMD 85-3), with slightly different specifications and compatibility.

In 1986 compatible machines were introduced by Didaktik: Didaktik Alfa 1 (a PMD 85-1 clone) and Didaktik Alfa 2 ( a PMD 85-2 clone). Didaktik Beta was a slightly improved Didaktik Alfa, having almost identical hardware. Didaktik Alfa and Beta were mostly deployed in schools to replace older PMD 85 computers.

After the Velvet Revolution of 1989 the computer market opened. The PMD 85 was not competitive in terms of quality or features to foreign machines and production stopped.

The PMD 85-2 was an inspiration for the MAŤO personal computer, released in 1989 as a self-assembly kit. It had different hardware and very limited compatibility - BASIC, memory structure and I/O were almost similar, but the tape format was different. It was intended as a home computer, but never really caught on.

The same year ZBA, a company from Brno better known for making firearms and motor vehicles, introduced the Consul 2717, another PMD 85-2 clone, sold to schools. Production of this machine ended in 1990.

== Variants ==
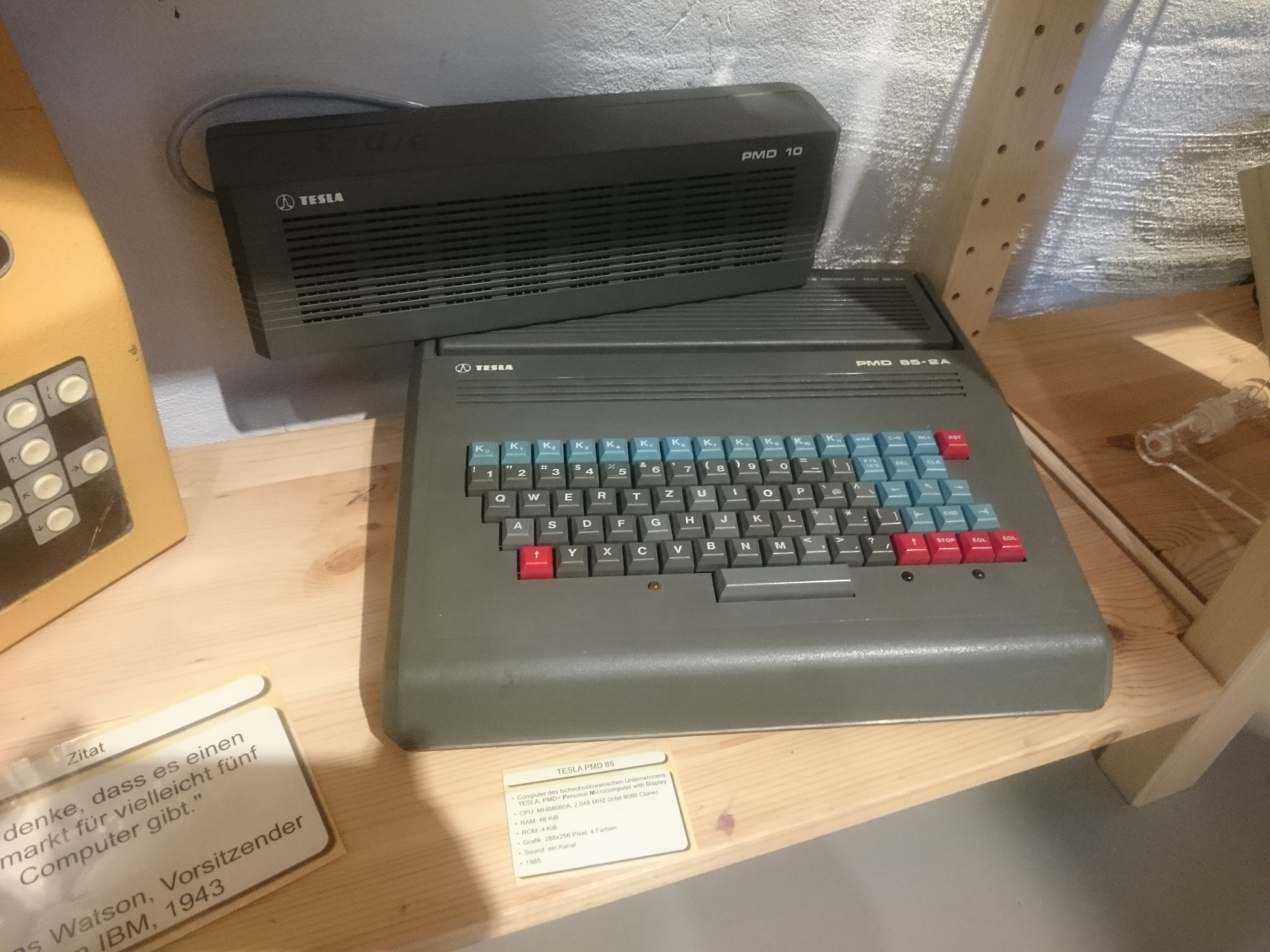
A 1987 Czechoslovak Tesla PMD85-2A with a MHB8080A CPU 2.048 MHz

- The PMD 85-0, a prototype produced by Tesla Piešťany (author was Roman Kišš), was originally in a white-coloured case and later in some other colours. It is quite rare today.
- The PMD 85, produced by Tesla Piešťany since 1985, was known as the PMD 85 or PMD 85-1. It was made with a dark gray case, and was known for its keyboards with extremely tough keys. Alphanumeric keys were evaluated at the moment of a key release.
- The PMD 85-2, produced by Tesla Piešťany since 1986, introduced some improvements in BASIC, some in input routines (for instance, key autorepeat), a more ergonomic keyboard (but less mechanically reliable) and also terminal mode. Some of the changes caused it to be not completely backward compatible.
- The PMD 85-2A, produced by Tesla Bratislava since 1987, used 64 KB RAM chips instead of 48 Kb, leading to less overheating of the memory chips, resulting in more memory available for BASIC, but was otherwise compatible with PMD 85-2.
- The PMD 85-3, produced by Tesla Bratislava since 1988, added colour TV output. Character encoding included all Czech and Slovak characters, and a Cyrillic version was also produced. The ROM size was enlarged to 8 KB and monitor included routines for communication with PMD 32 floppy disk assembly, a ROM integrity test and also "PMD 85-2 compatibility mode" by relocation.

== Specifications ==
- MHB8080A 2.048MHz CPU (clone of Intel 8080)
- 48 KB RAM (64 KB for PMD 85-2A and PMD 85-3 )
- 4 KB ROM (8 KB for PMD 85-3)
- System monitor
- Tape utilities
- B/W TV output (PAL for the PMD 85-3) or RGB component video
- 288×256 resolution
- 4-level attribute (Black, White, Grey, Blink) selectable per 6-pixel-wide area (8 colors for the PMD-85-3)
- Tape recorder interface
- IRPS interface (passive current loop RS-232 without modem control signals)
- Module interface. A ROM module with the BASIC programming language was a standard part of the computer, but there were more ROM modules containing Pascal, Assembler, LOGO etc. A programmer was also available.
- IMS-2 interface (non-standard connector and electrically partially non-conforming) based on MHB8255A
- Two 8-bit parallel buses supporting handshaking (via second MHB8255A)
- Application connector (de facto system I/O bus)

== Picture gallery ==
PMD 85-2 Computer

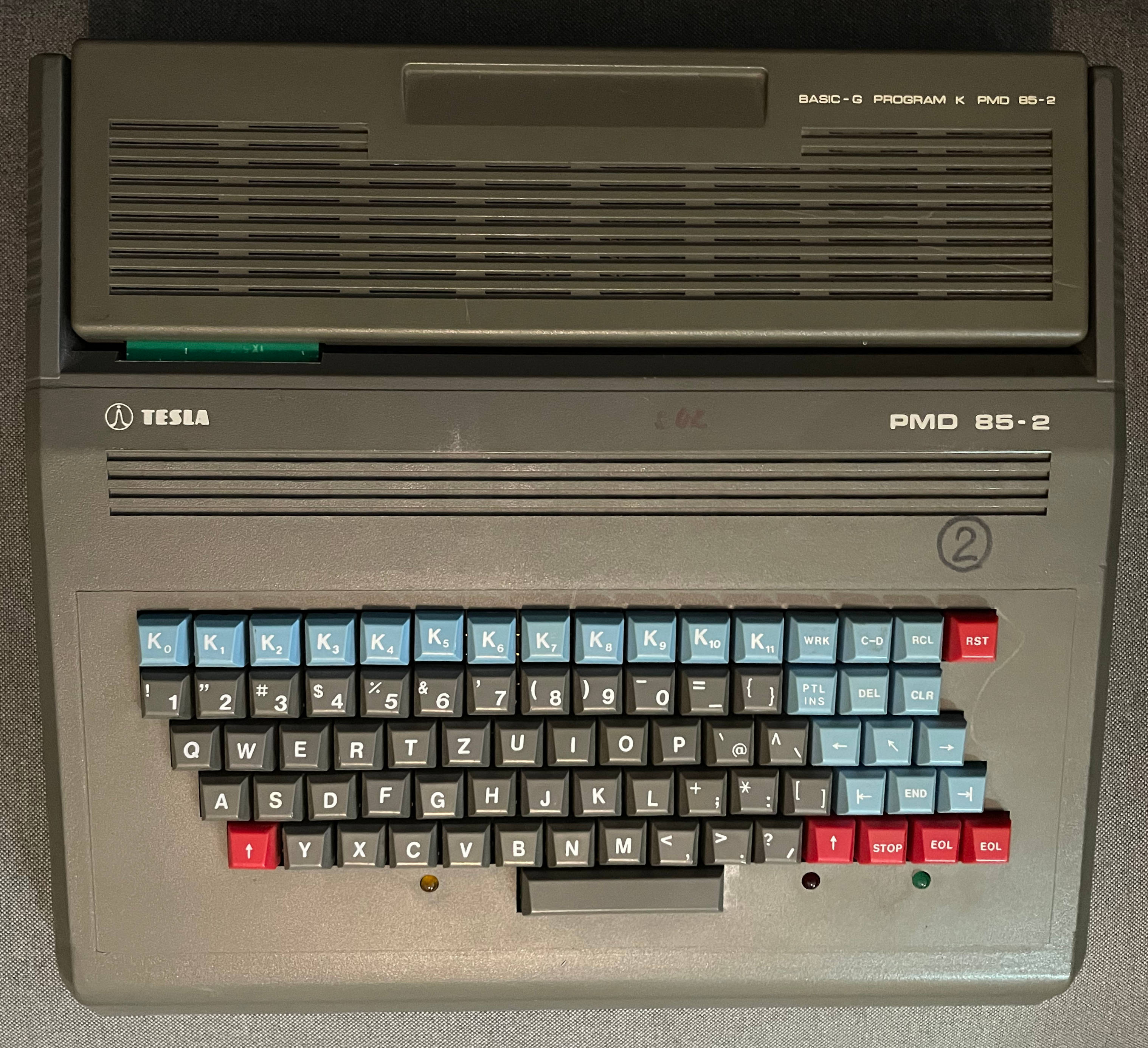
Top view

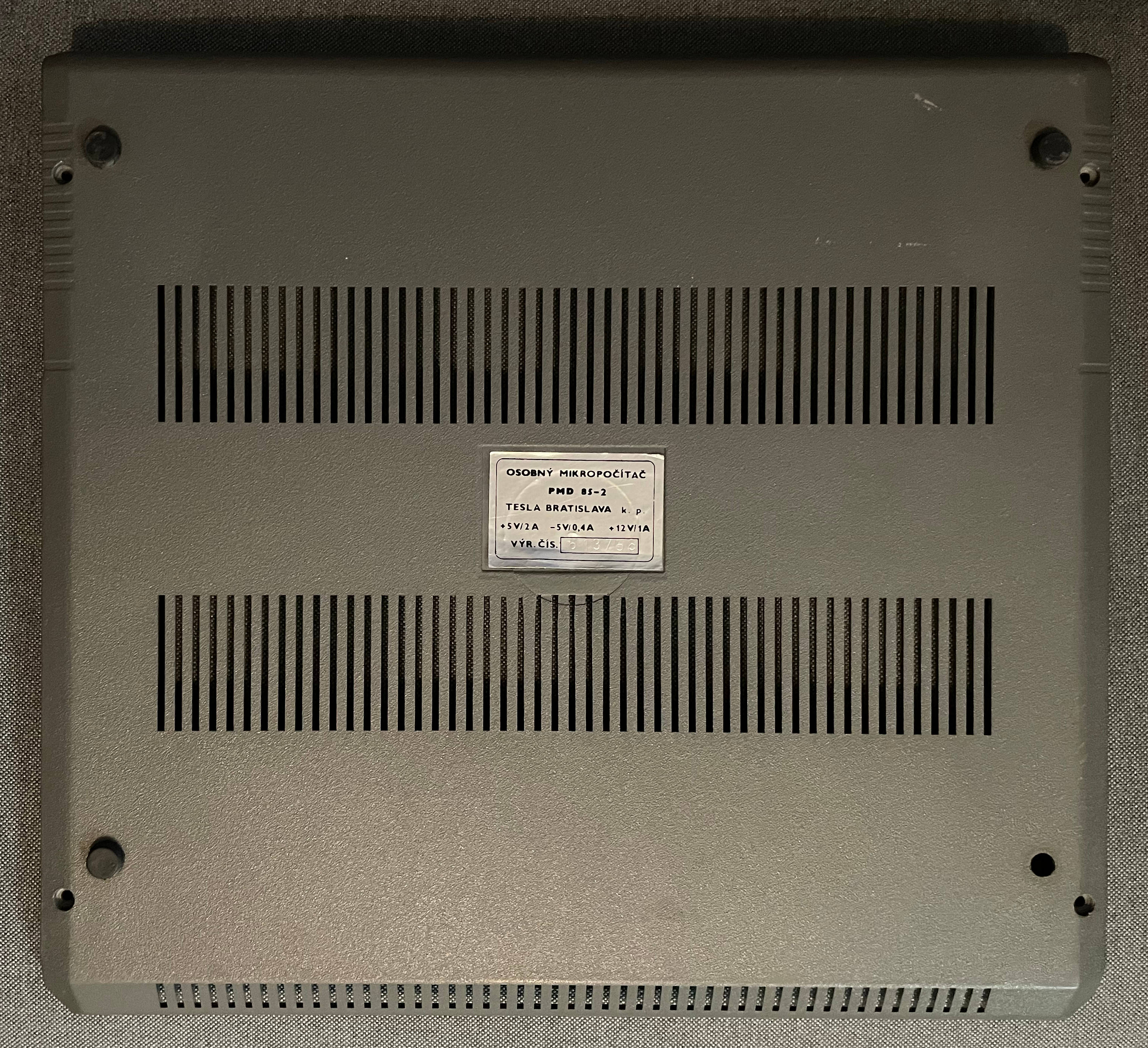
Bottom view

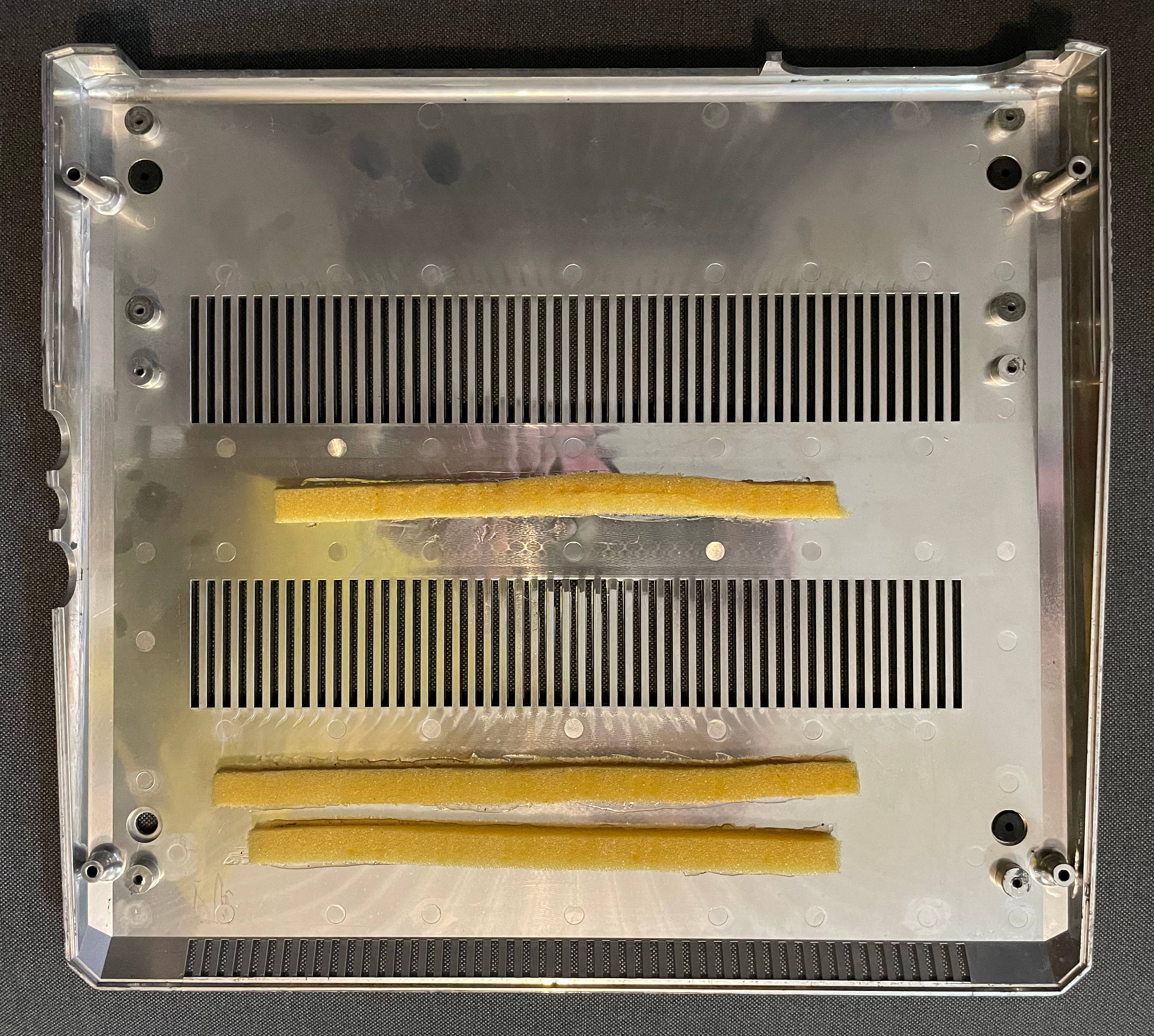
Inner view of the bottom case

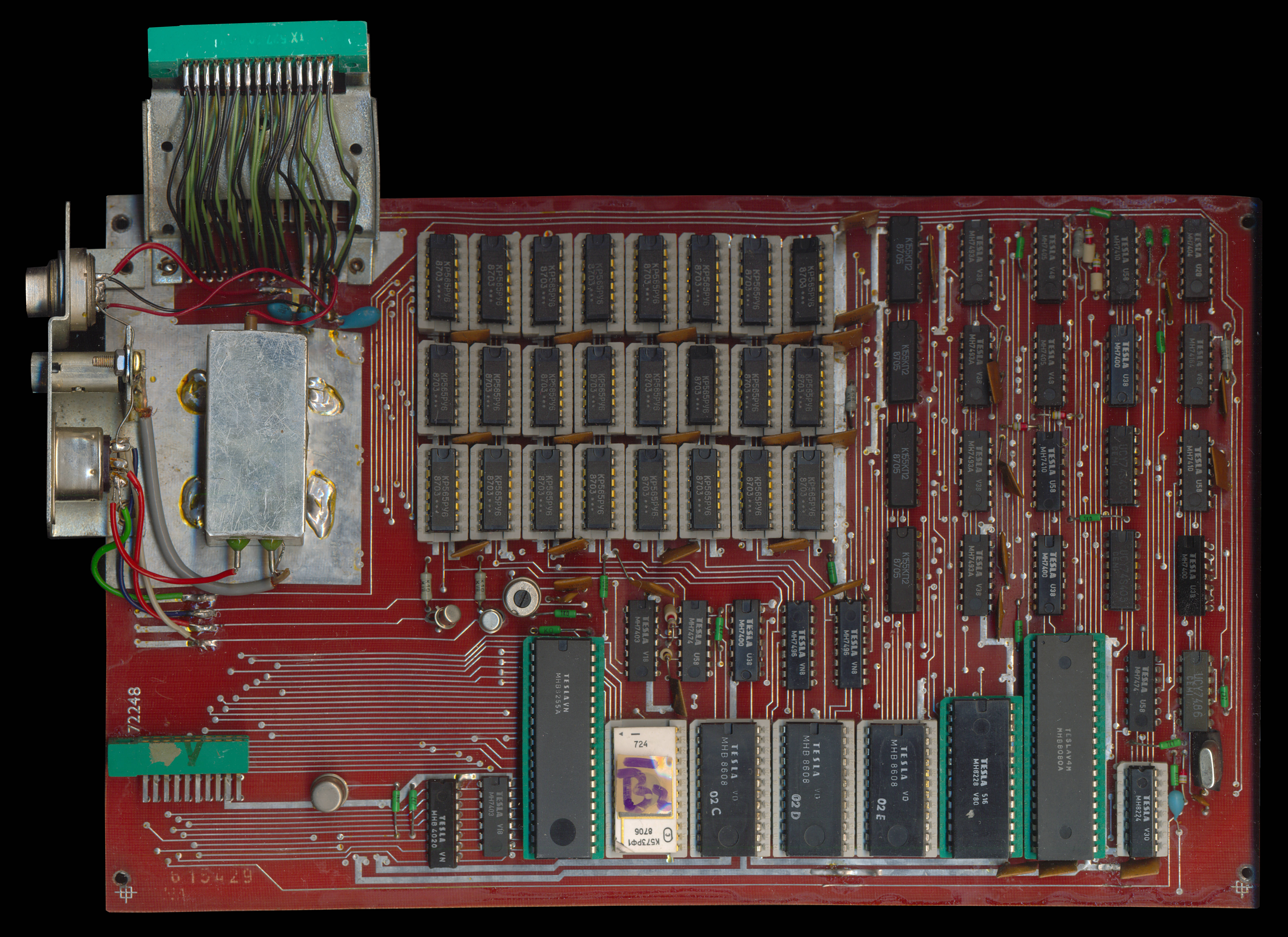
Main PCB component side.

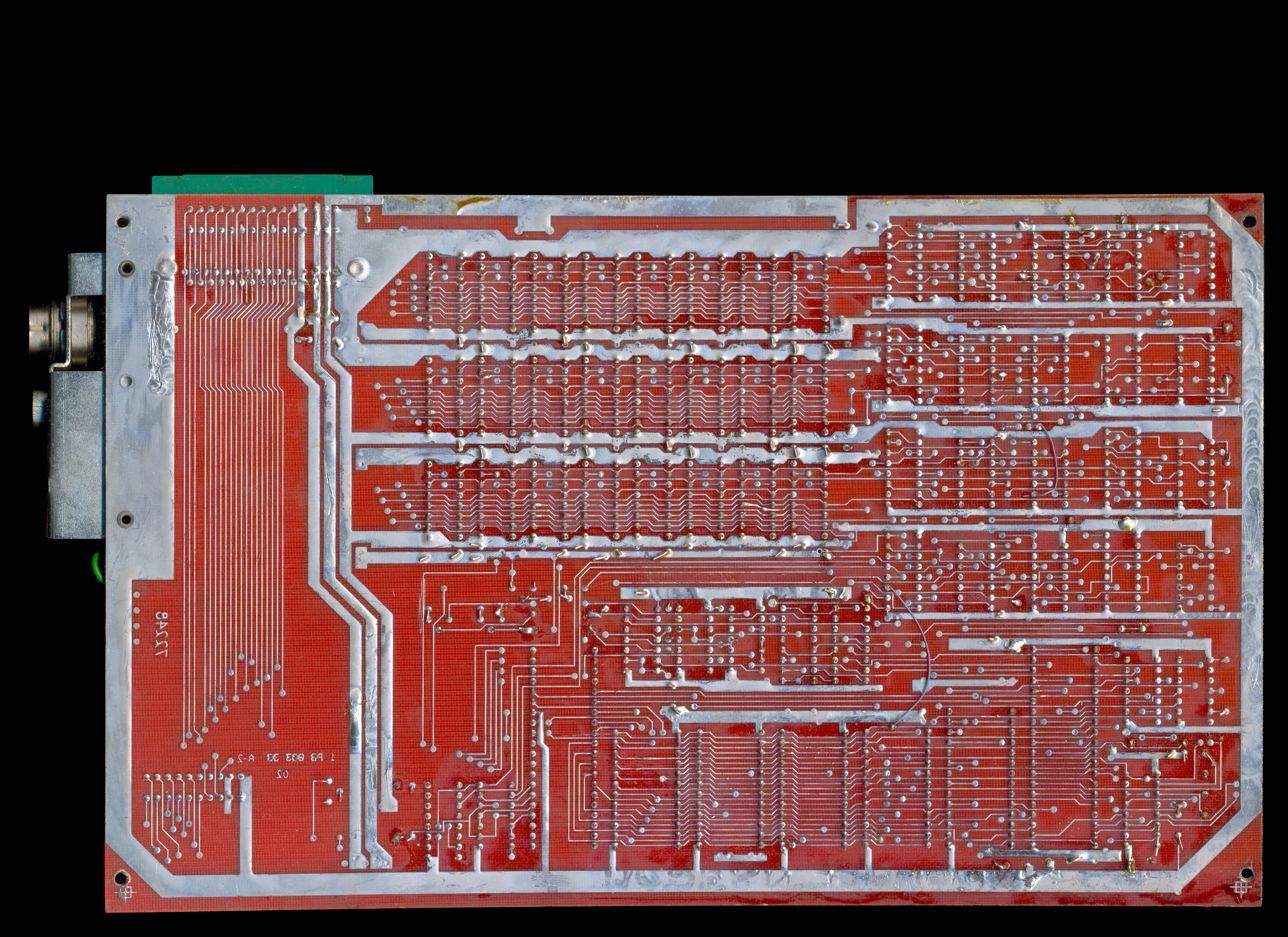
Main PCB solder side.

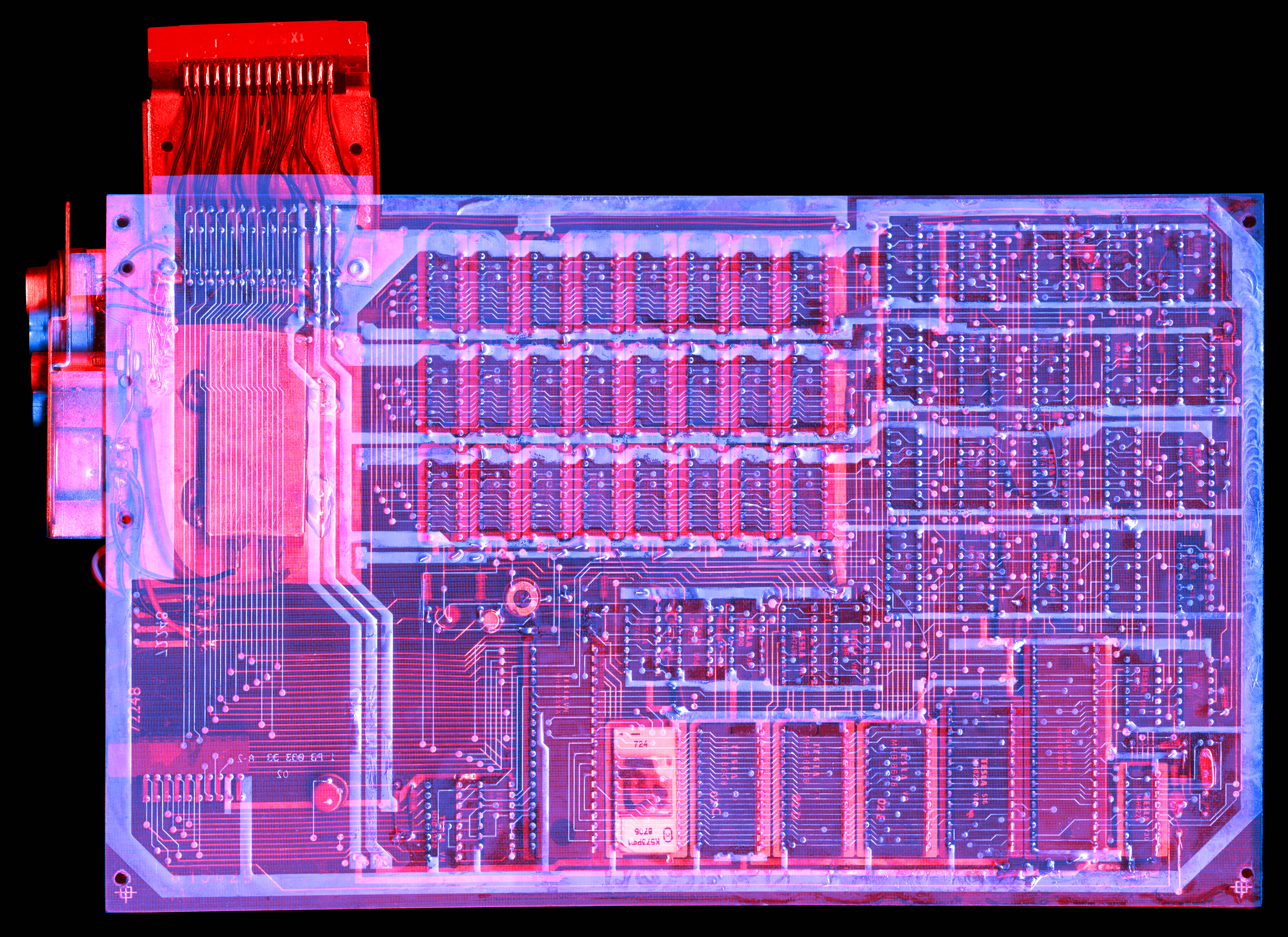
Main PCB X-Ray view.

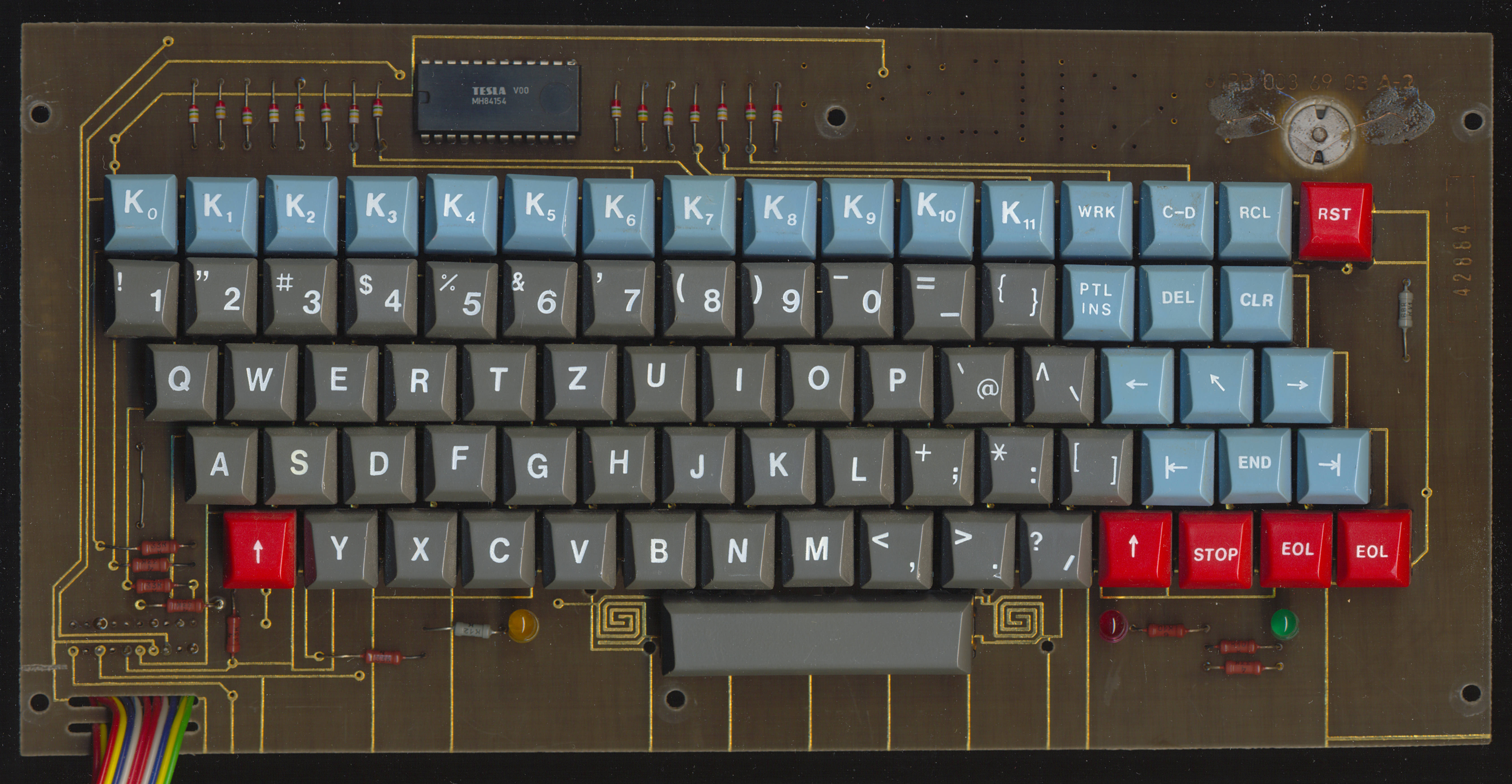
Keyboard PCB component side.

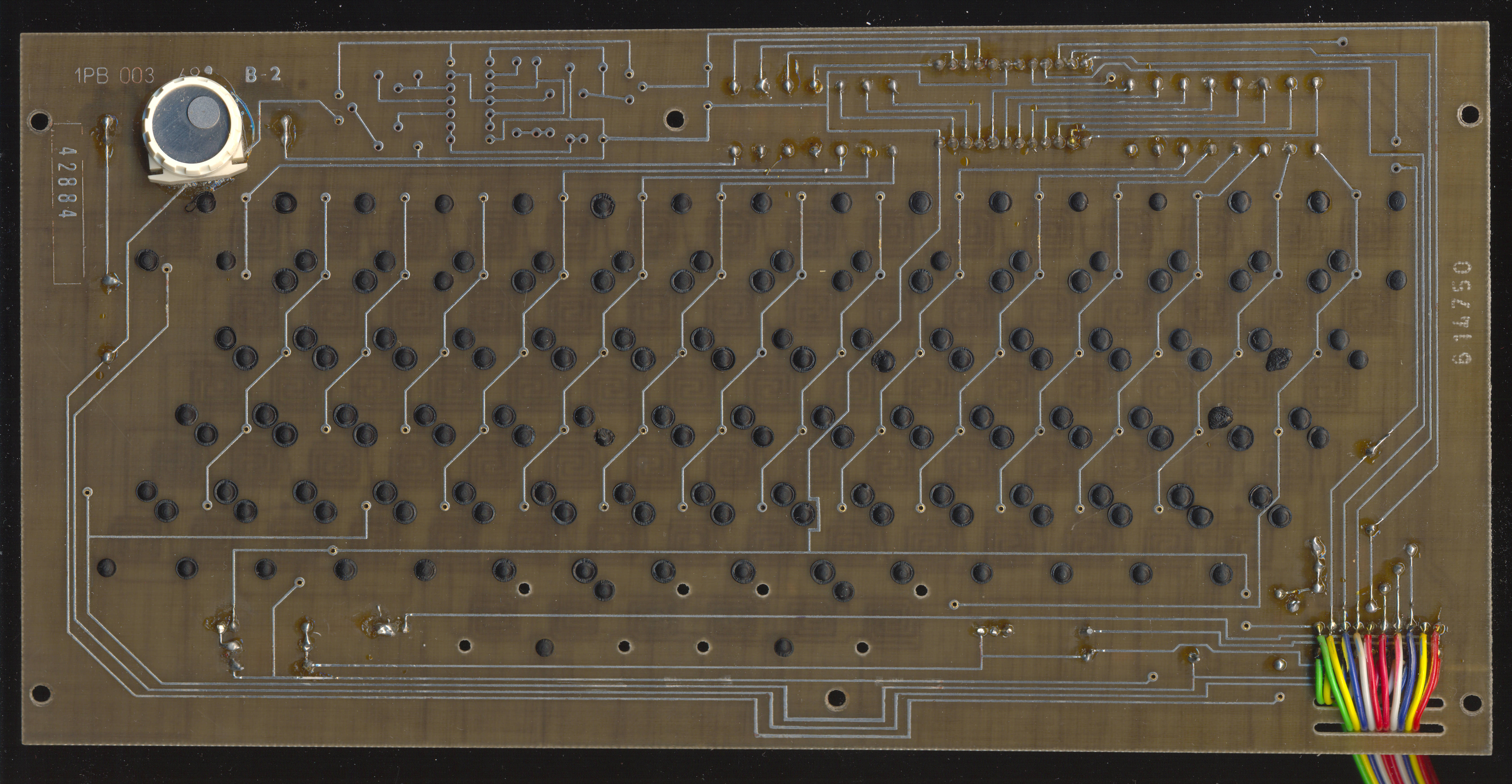
Keyboard PCB solder side.

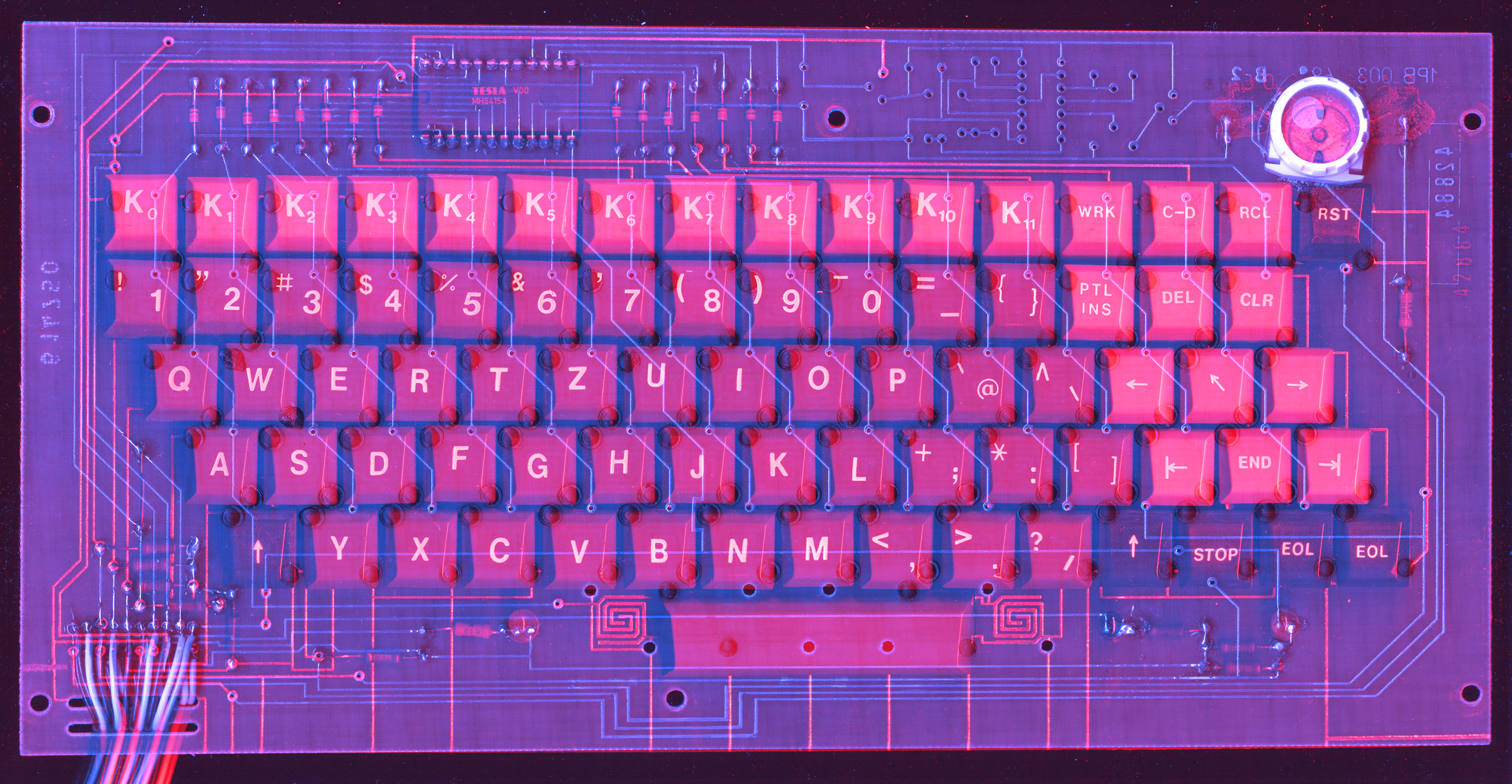
Keyboard PCB X-Ray view.

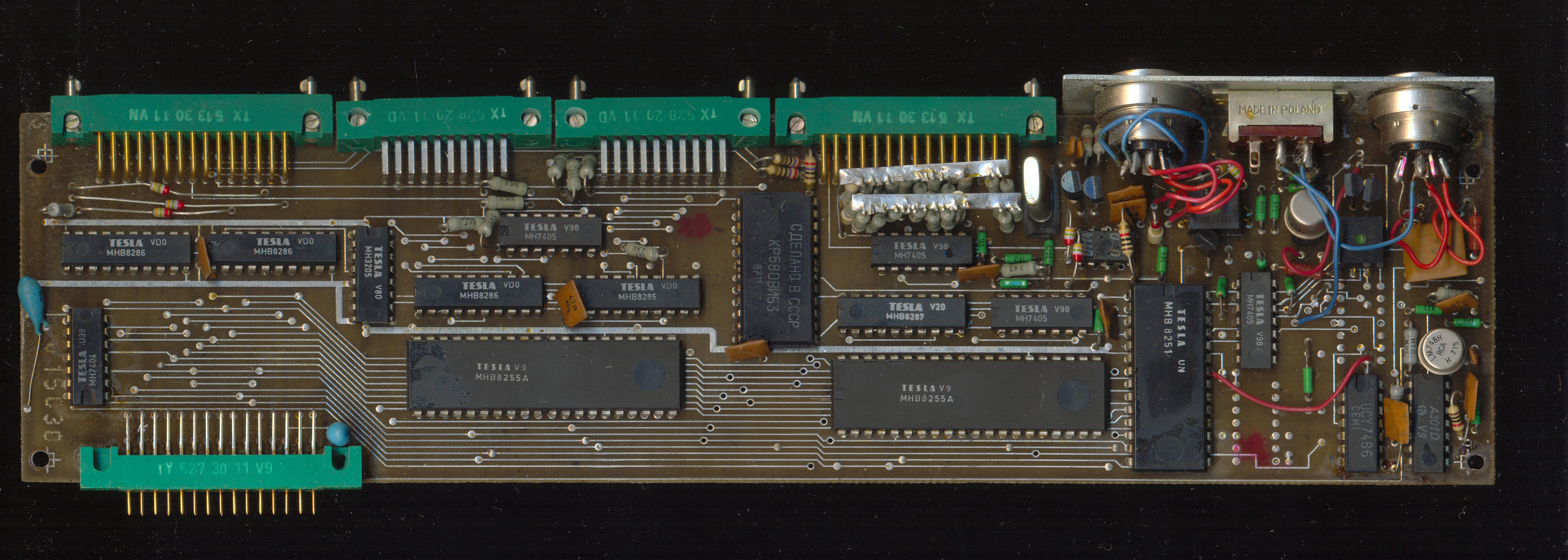
I/O PCB component side.

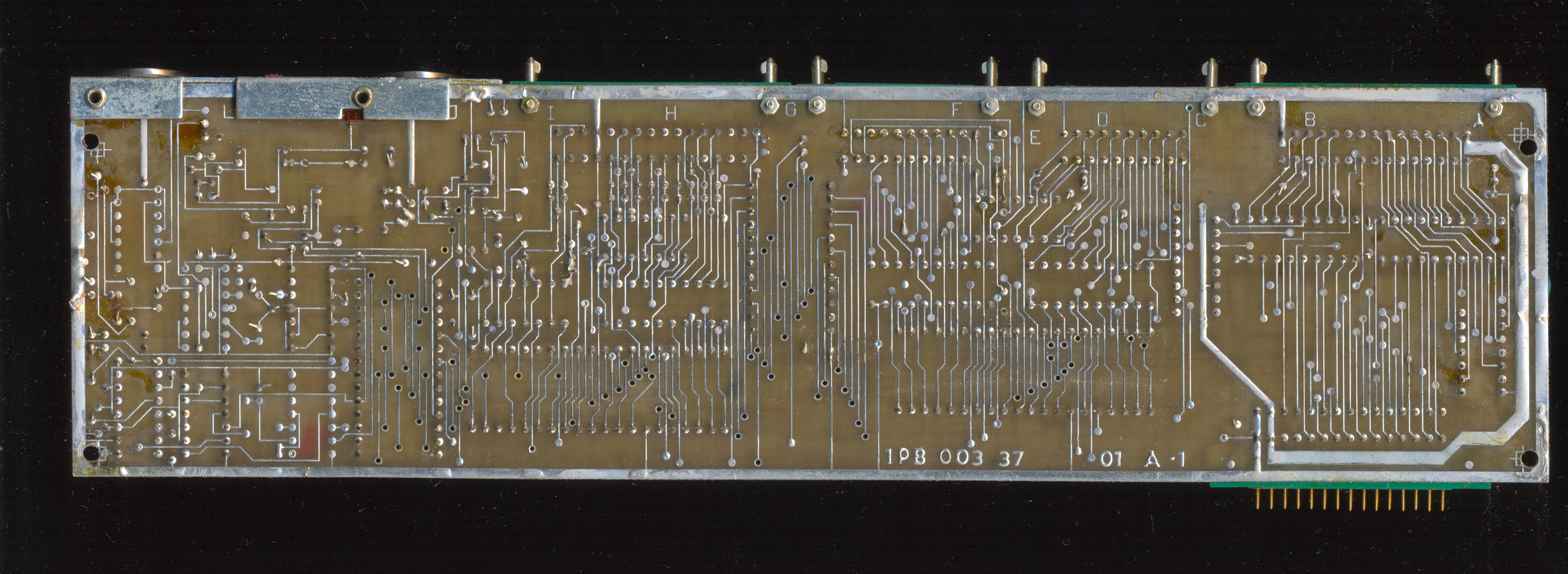
I/O PCB solder side.

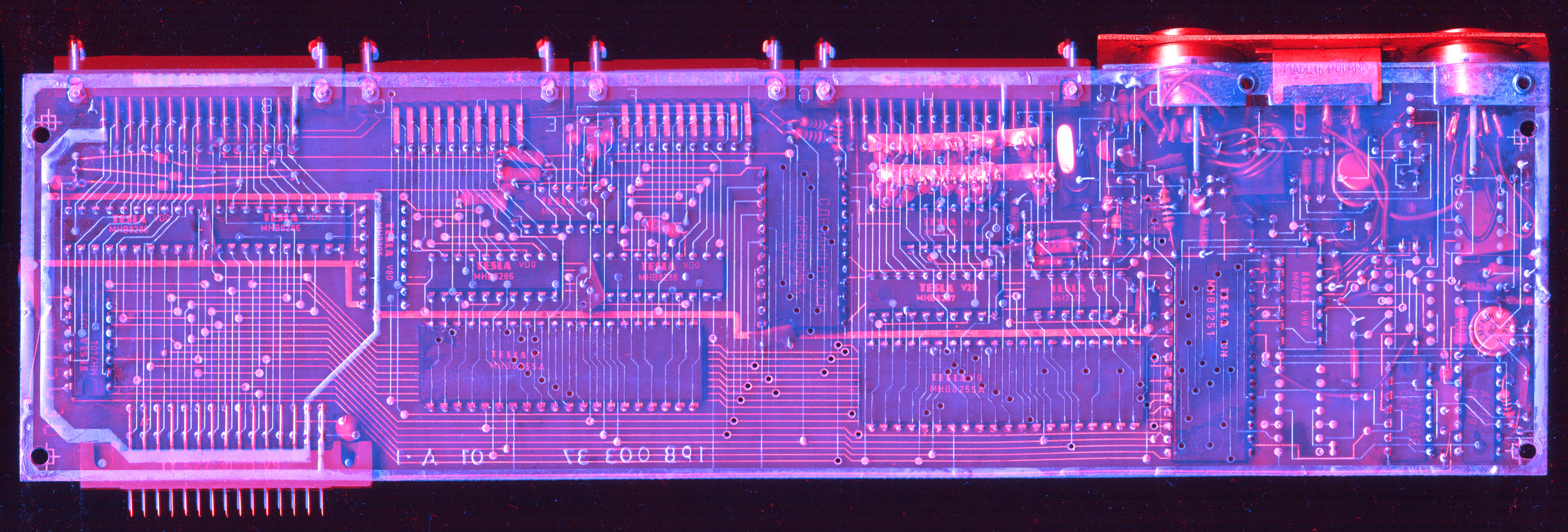
I/O PCB X-Ray view.
G-BASIC cartridge

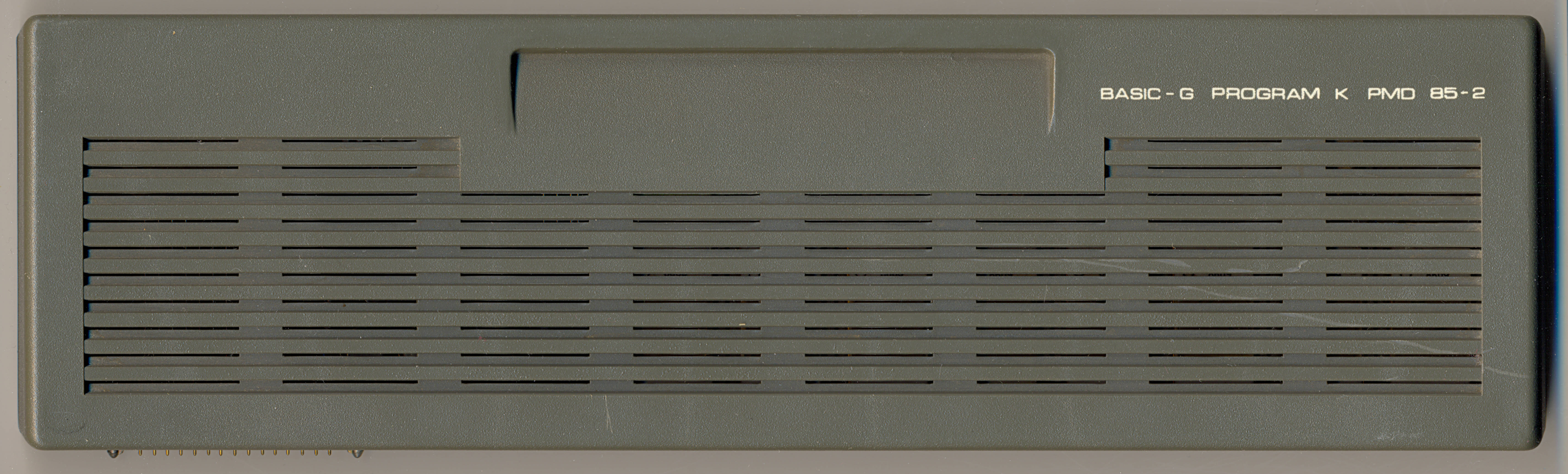
Top view.

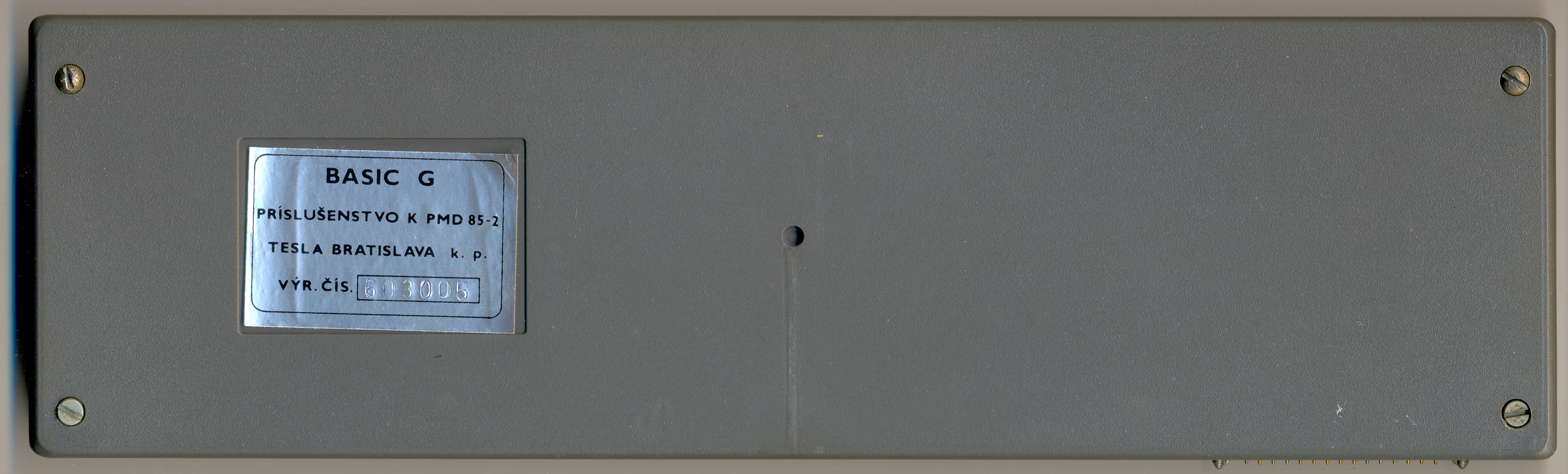
Bottom view.

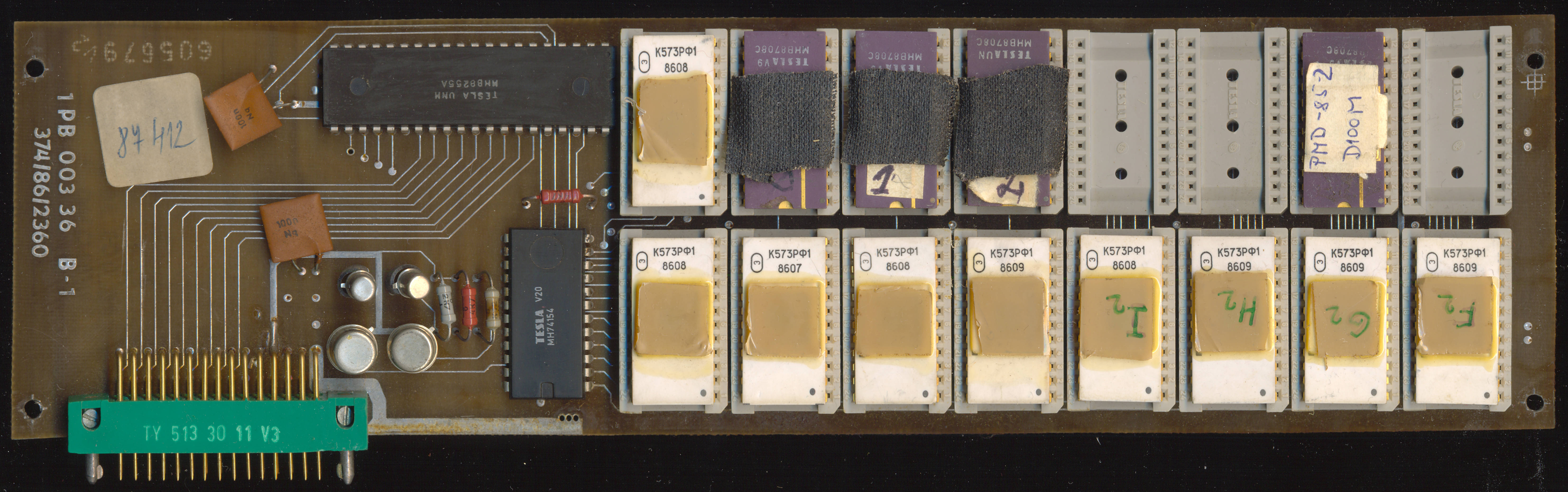
PCB component side.

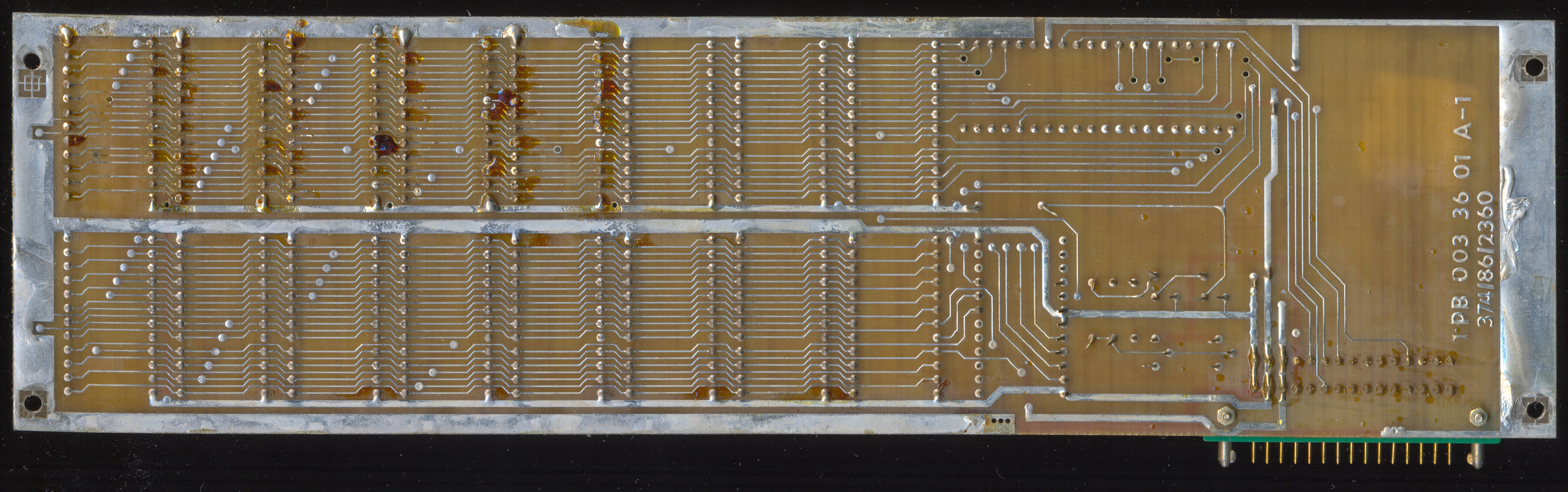
PCB solder side.

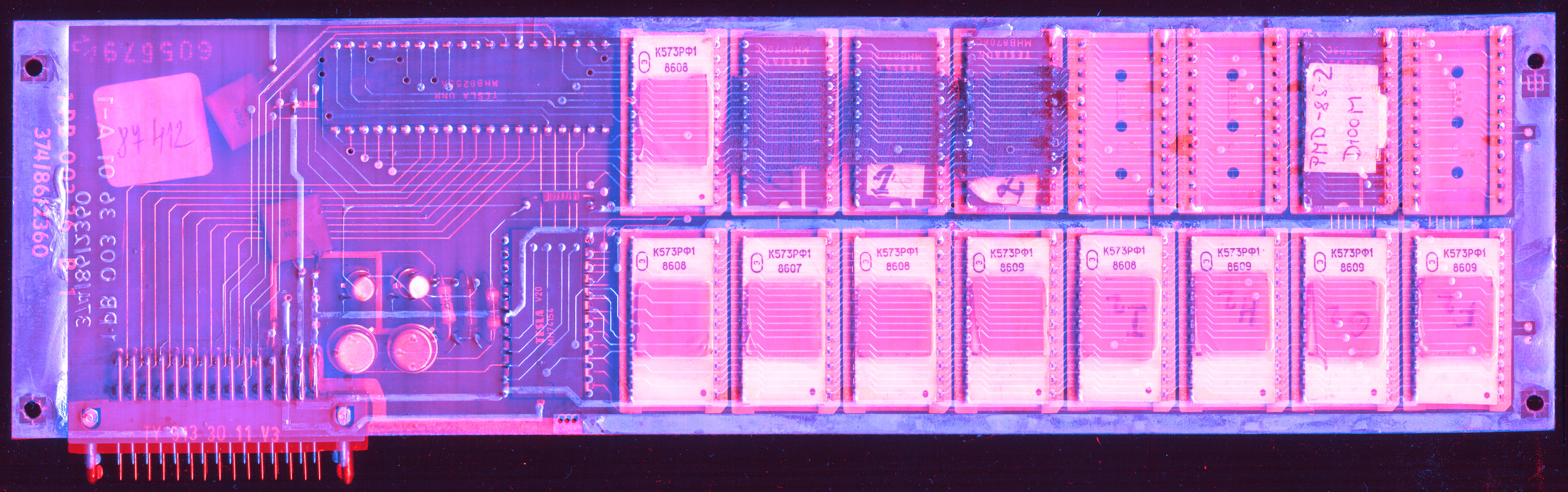
PCB X-Ray view.
PMD 10 Power Supply Unit

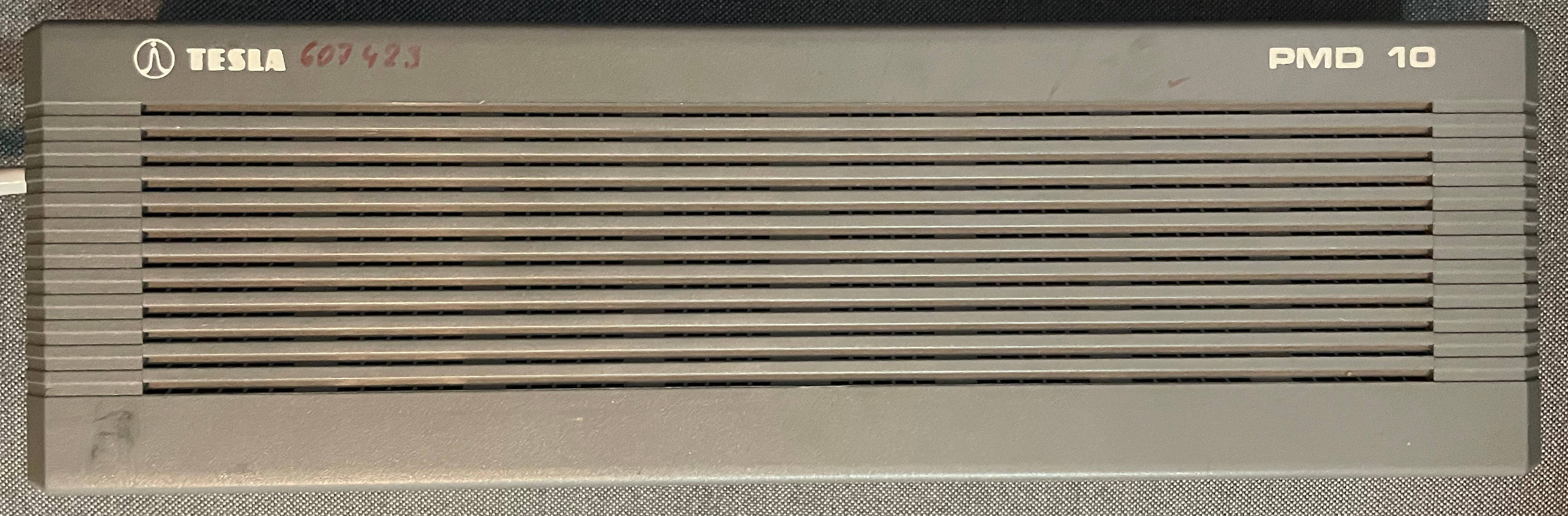
Top view.

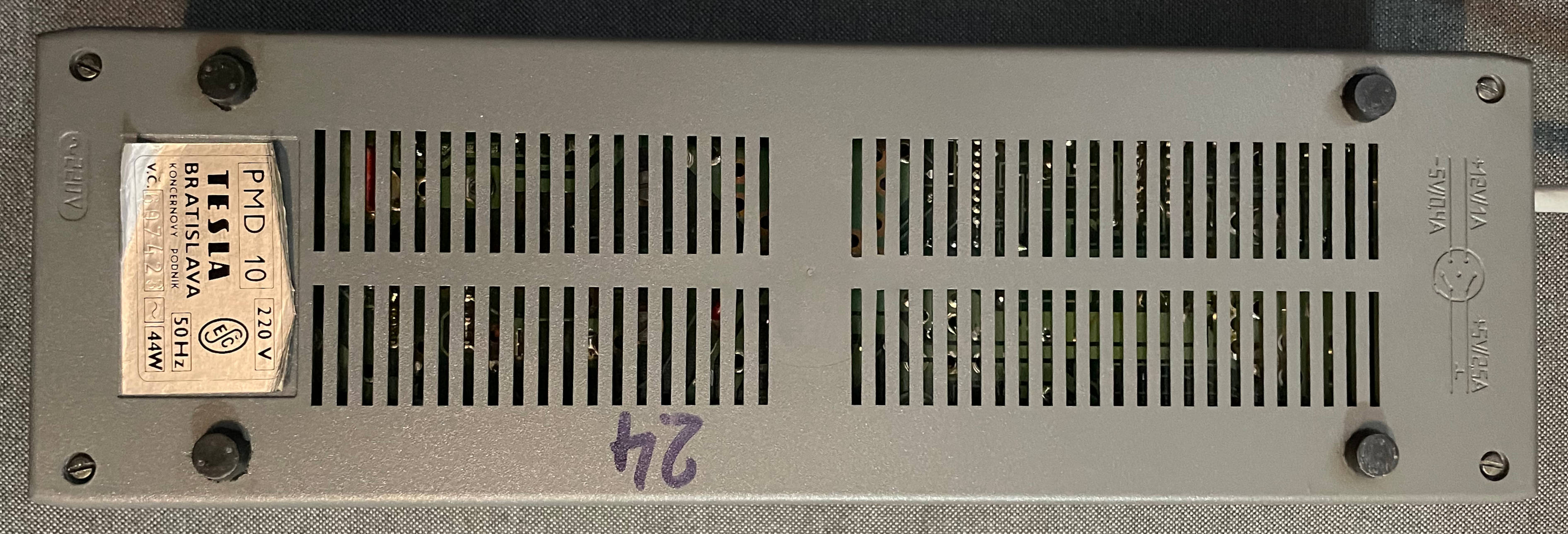
Bottom view.

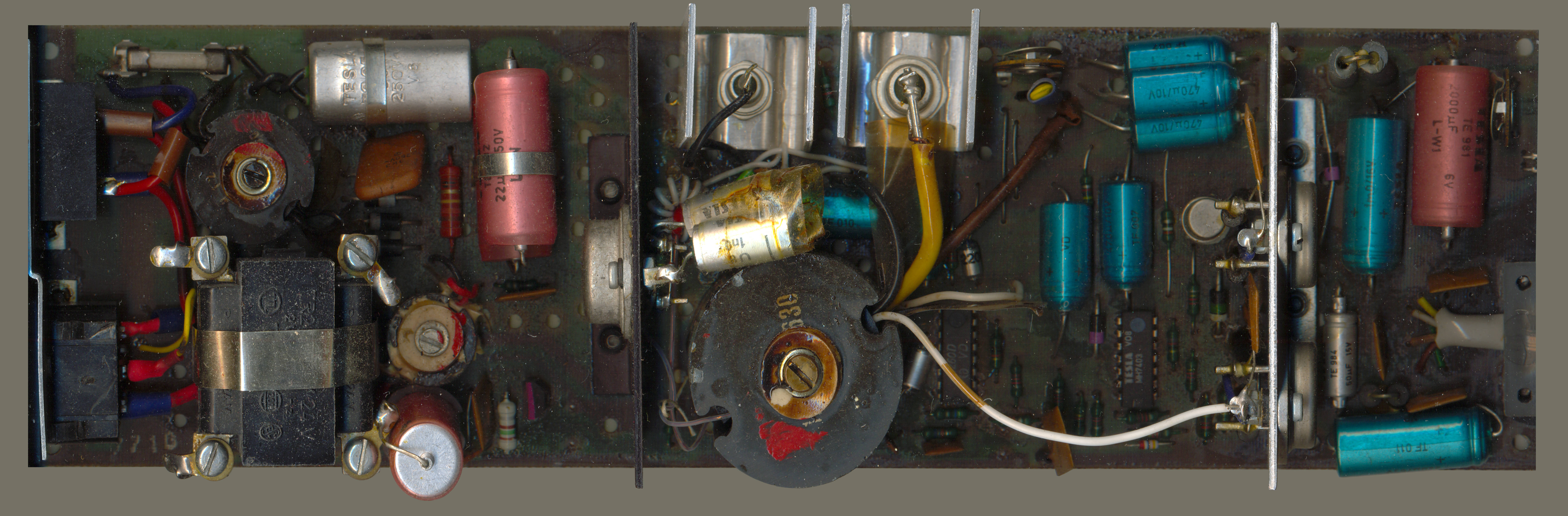
PCB component side.

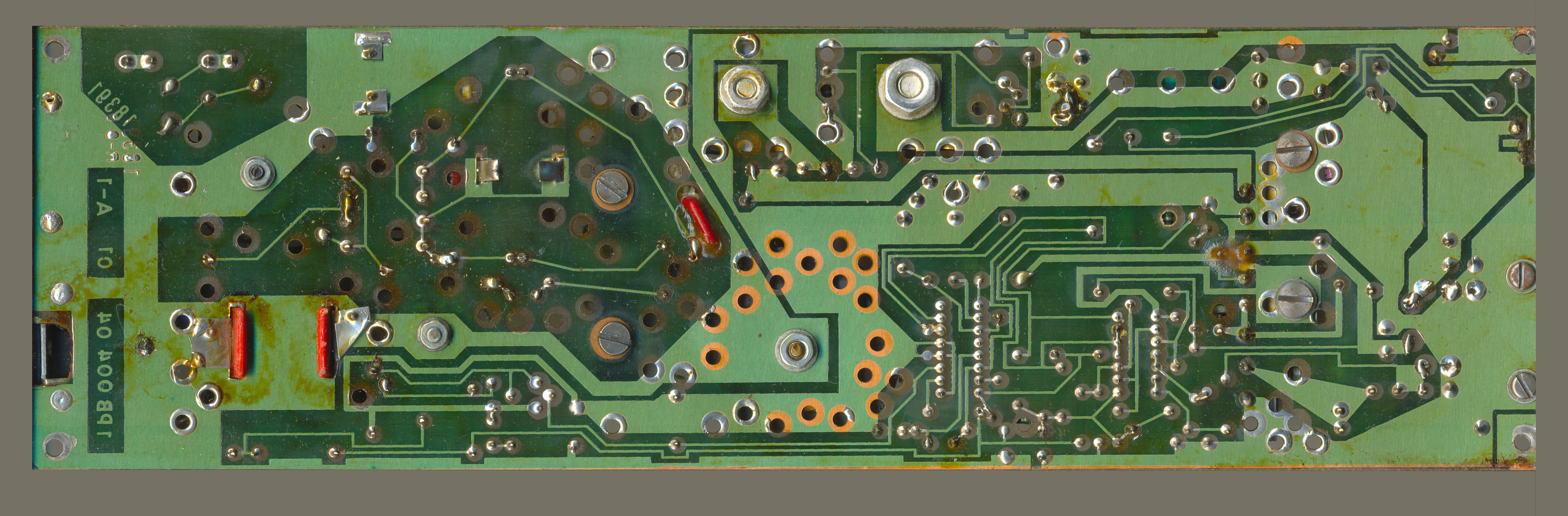
PCB solder side.

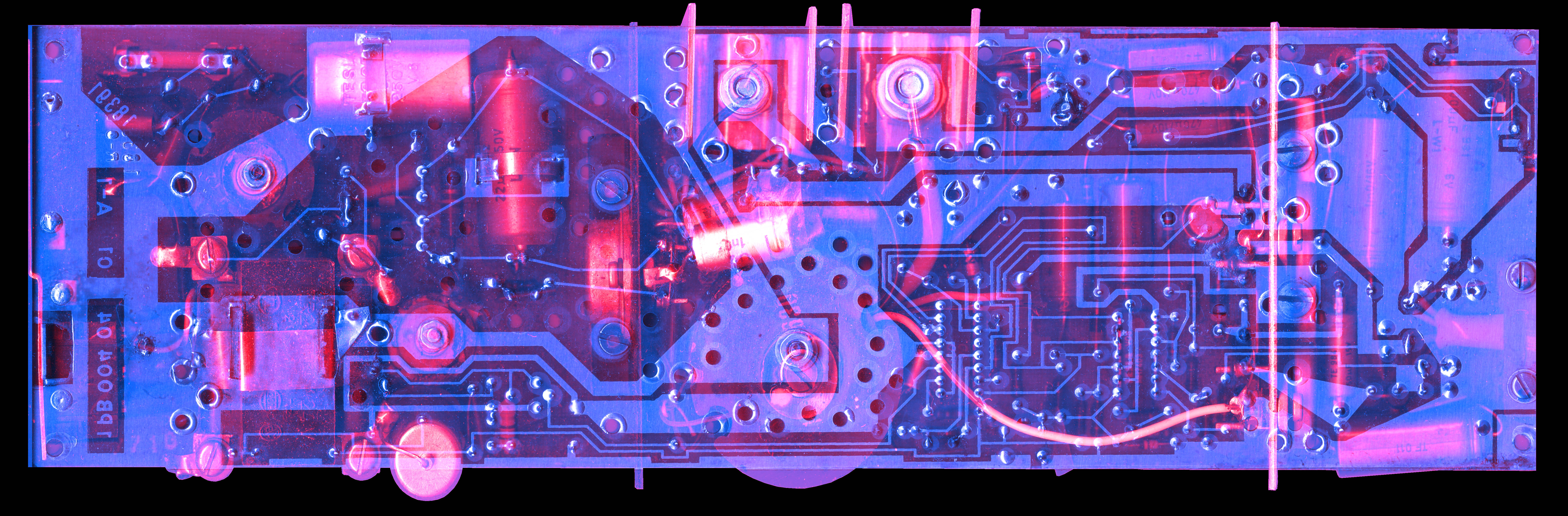
PCB X-Ray view.

== See also ==
- MAŤO
- Tesla (Czechoslovak company)
- IQ 151
- Didaktik
