= Matto =

Matto or Mattō may refer to:

== Places ==
- Mattō, Ishikawa, a former city in Ishikawa Prefecture, Japan, now part of Hakusan
  - Mattō Station, a railway station in the city of Hakusan, Ishikawa, Japan
- Monte Matto, a mountain in Italy

== People and fictional characters ==
- Juan Matto (born 1977), Paraguayan footballer
- Juan Bautista Rivarola Matto (1933–1999), Paraguayan journalist, narrator, essayist and playwright
- Sergio Matto (1930–?), Uruguayan basketball player
- Il Matto (Italian for "The Fool"), a character in the film La Strada, played by Richard Basehart

== See also ==
- Matos (disambiguation), also includes Mattos
