= Eusébio de Matos =

Portuguese orator, religious and painter (1629–1692)

Eusébio de Matos e Guerra
- Born: Salvador, Bahia, Portuguese Brazil
- Relatives: Gregório de Matos

Eusébio de Matos e Guerra (1629 in Salvador – 7 July 1692) was an orator, painter, poet, and professor of theology. He worked between 1629 and 1692 and was a student of Maurício de Nassau, founder of the "Bahian school" of painting. He was a brother of the satirist Gregório de Matos (1636-1696).

== Early life and education ==
Eusébio de Matos was born in Salvador, Bahia in 1629, the son of nobleman Pedro Gonçalves de Mattos and Dona Marina da Guerra. Eusébio and his brother Gregório studied humanities together under Father António Vieira, a philosopher. He joined the Society of Jesus on March 14, 1644 at the age of 15, became an instructor, and ultimately succeeded Antonio Vieira. He became one of three noted orators in Salvador, along with António Vieira and Father Antônio de Sá. He was also a musician and composer. He was played the viola and harp, and composed both sacred and secular music.

== Later career ==
He represented the interests of his family in transaction with the colleges of the Jesuits of Bahia and Santo Antão de Lisboa in 1659. He was called to Lisbon in 1669 to serve as orator of the King of Portugal, but was prevented from going by his superiors. He published Ecce Homo in Lisbon in 1677. He left the Society of Jesus and joined the Order of Mount Carmel in 1680, and became known as Eusébio da Soledade. He published the Sermão da soledade e lágrimas de Maria Santíssima Senhora Nossa in Lisbon in 1681. He returned to Bahia in the same year. He died on July 7, 1692. A collection of his sermons were published In 1694, after his death in Lisbon in 1694. Ecce Homo was published in Rio de Janeiro in 1923.

== Paintings ==
The painting on the ceiling of the nave of Church and Convent of Our Lady of Carmo, completed in the middle of the 17th century, is attributed to him. Eusébio da Soledade is also the author of the painting of São Pedro Arrependido, which was located in the Church and Monastery of Our Lady of Monserrate until the end of the 1940s.

== Works ==
- Ecce Homo
- Sermão da Soledade e Lagrimas de Maria Santissima pregado na Sé da Bahia
- Sermões do padre Mestre Eusebio de Mattos
- Oração fúnebre nas exéquias de D. Estevam Dos Santos, Bispo do Brasil, 14 de julho de 1672
- Seis sermões do Rosário (lost)
