= IQ 151 =

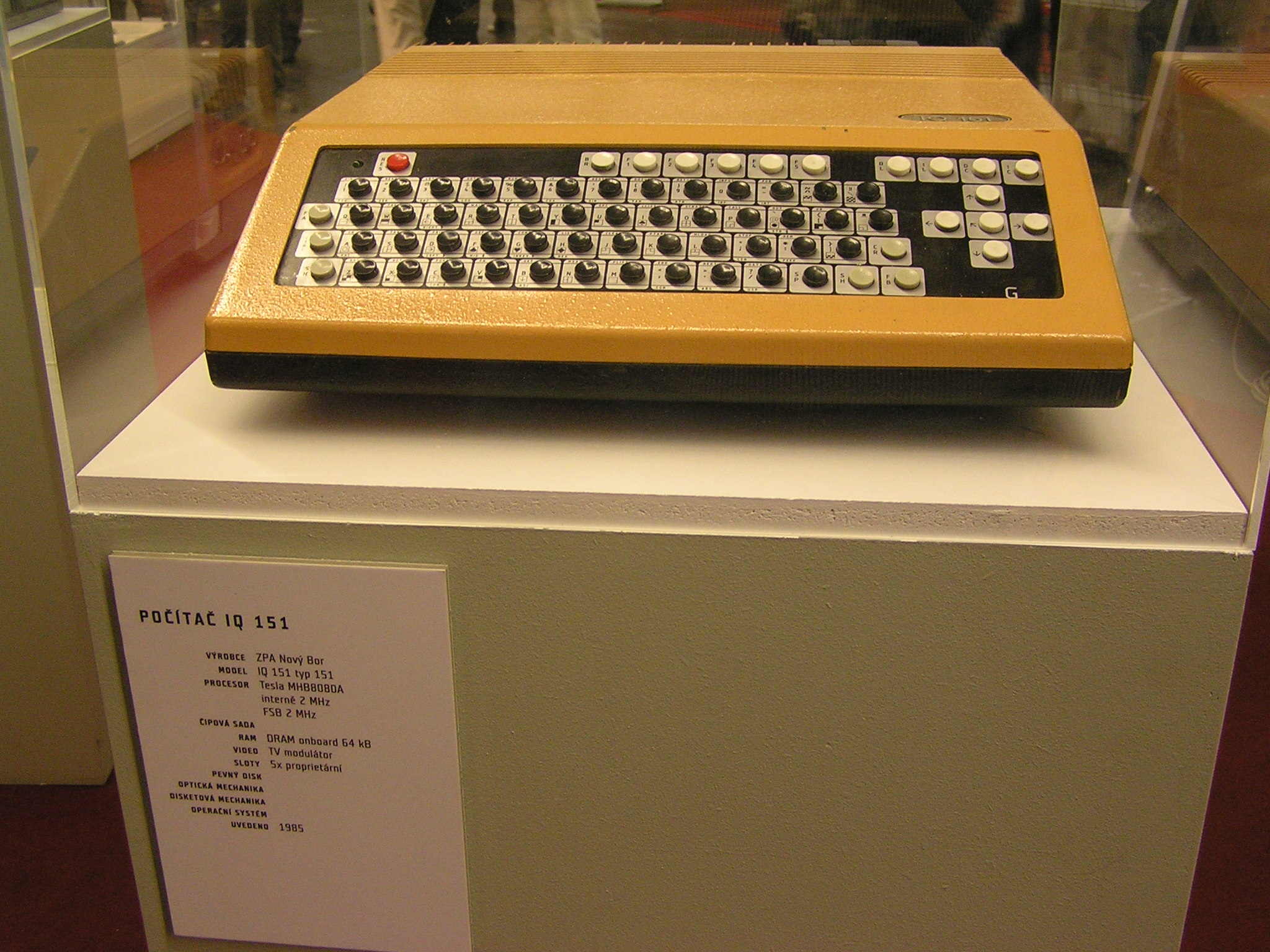
- IQ 151 - front view
- Manufacturer: ZPA Nový Bor
- Type: personal computer
- Released: 1985; 41 years ago
- Discontinued: 1989
- Operating system: ROM monitor, AMOS (Almost Memory Oriented System), MIKROS (on 64 KB machines)
- CPU: Tesla MHB8080A @ 2 MHz
- Memory: 32 KB RAM (later on 64 KB), 4 KB ROM
- Display: 32 x 32 semigraphic characters; 64 x 32 characters or 512 x 256 pixel with expansion modules
- Sound: One voice, built-in speaker
- Power: Built-in PSU

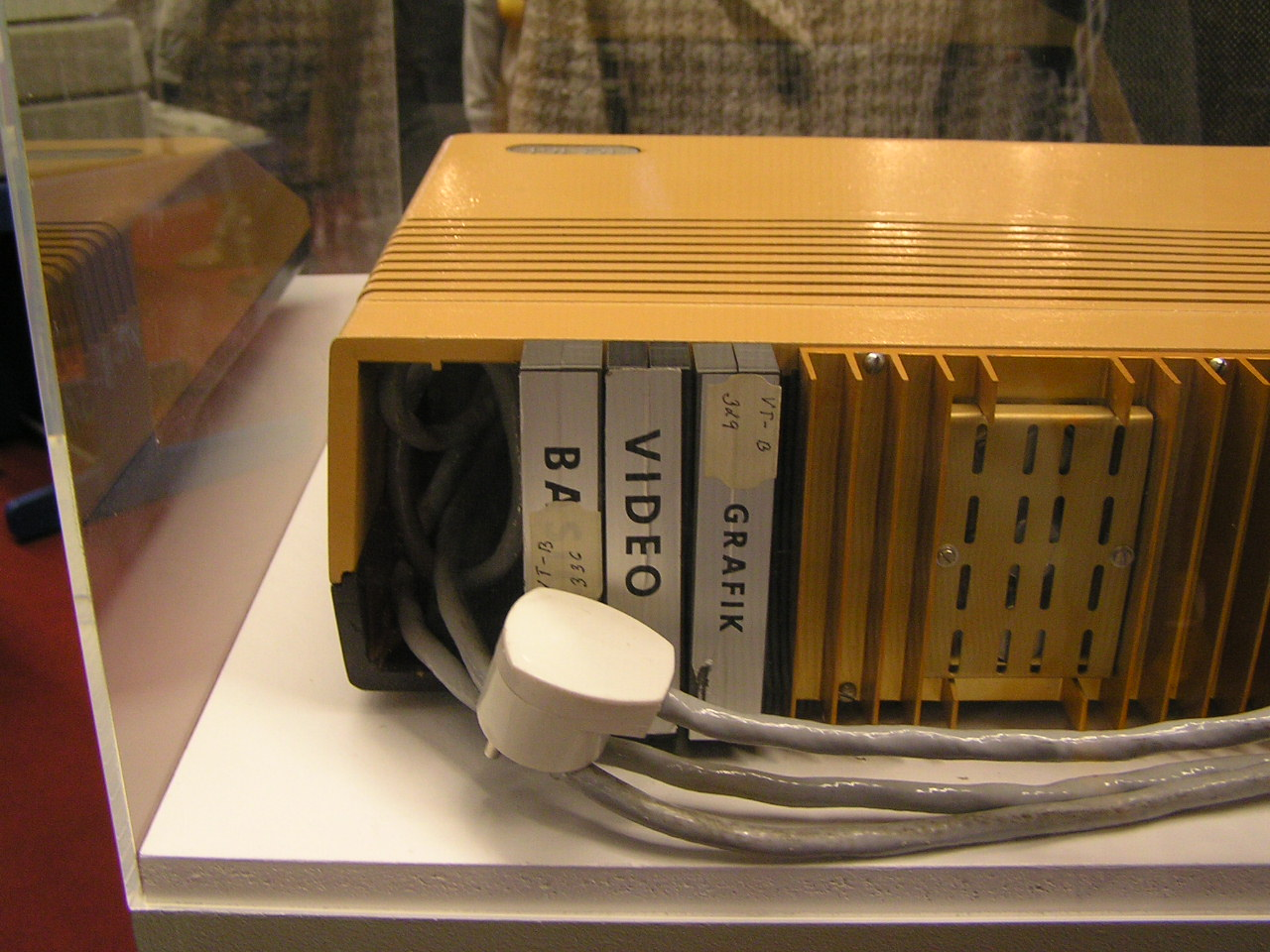
IQ 151 - rear view

The IQ 151 was a personal computer produced by ZPA Nový Bor in the former Czechoslovakia.

It had a Tesla MHB8080A (copy of Intel 8080) CPU running at 2 MHz, 32 KB RAM (later on 64 KB), 4 KB ROM, with semigraphic text mode video output and the BASIC programming language.

The mainboard contained only CPU, supporting ICs and memory. Everything else was added by expansion modules, with five available slots.

Like mentioned above, elementary expansion modules are Basic 6, a BASIC language interpreter and Video 32, a video generator, producing 32 columns and 32 rows of text and semigraphic characters.

Advanced expansion modules include Video 64, allowing 64 x 32 character text display; Grafik, adding true 512 x 256 monochromatic graphics and Basic G, with additional graphical functions to BASIC; Pascal, and editor and compiler of the PASCAL programming language; Assembler, a low level programming language; AD/DA, a ADC / DAC converter interface; MS 151 and MINIGRAPH, a drivers for Czechoslovak plotters XY4130 and Aritma 0507; STAPPER, a driver for a punched tape unit; SESTYK, adding a serial port for networking and DISC 2, a controller for a 8" floppy drive using on an unlicensed CP/M clone. Due to an EPROM address conflict, DISC 2 could not be used with the Basic G or Pascal modules.

It IQ 151 was primarily used in Czech schools, while in Slovakia the PMD 85 series was used instead. This computer was produced locally due to a lack of foreign currency with which to buy systems from the West.

This computer had a persistent tendency to overheat under even a light workload and thus the common joke about it was "it's an excellent coffee mug heater." It also had a poor membrane in its keyboard, in comparison with slightly more advanced PMD 85.

After the fall of Communism in 1989, production of the IQ 151 was stopped, since it was not competitive in terms of price, quality or features compared to more modern computers.
