= Didaktik =

Home computers produced in former Czechoslovakia

The Didaktik was a series of 8-bit home computers based on the clones of Intel 8080 and Zilog Z80 processors produced by Didaktik in Skalica, in the former Czechoslovakia.

Initially the company produced PMD 85 compatible machines aimed at schools, then switching to the home market with ZX Spectrum clones.

Didaktik's glory diminished with the falling price of the 16-bit computers, such as the Atari and Amiga, around the middle of the 1990s until it was finally steam-rolled by the PC soon after. The production of Didaktik computers stopped in the year 1994.

== Didaktik Alfa ==
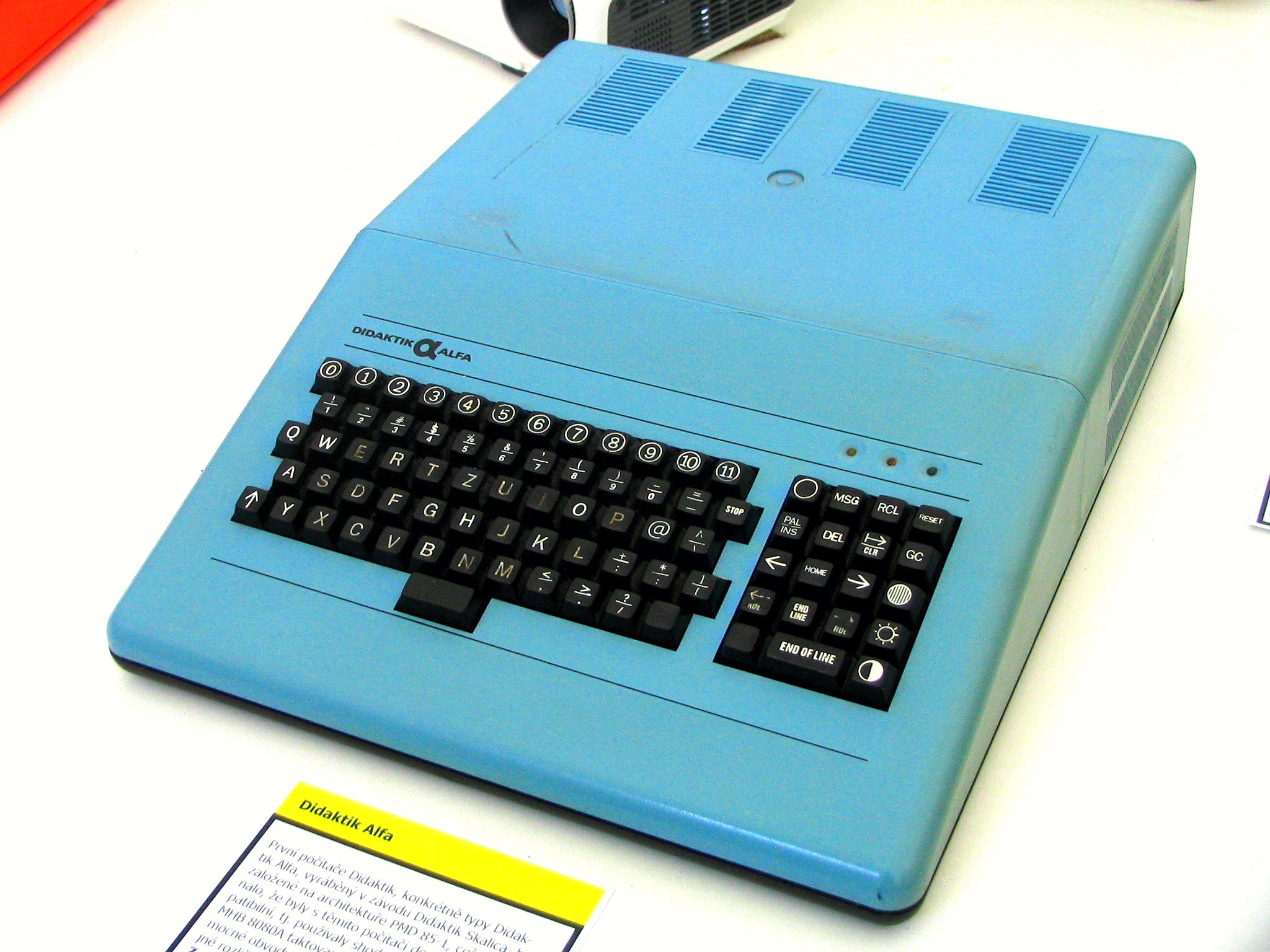
Didaktik Alfa

Didaktik Alfa was produced in 1986, as a "more professional" clone of PMD 85. It featured 2.048 MHz Intel 8080 CPU, 48 KB RAM, 8 KB ROM with built-in BASIC, good keyboard (compared with PMD 85), monitor video output (but no TV output) with 288×256 resolution and four possible colours. Despite some changes in ROM, it was mostly compatible with PMD 85. Didaktik Alfa 1 was a clone of PMD 85-1, Didaktik Alfa 2 of PMD 85-2.

== Didaktik Beta ==
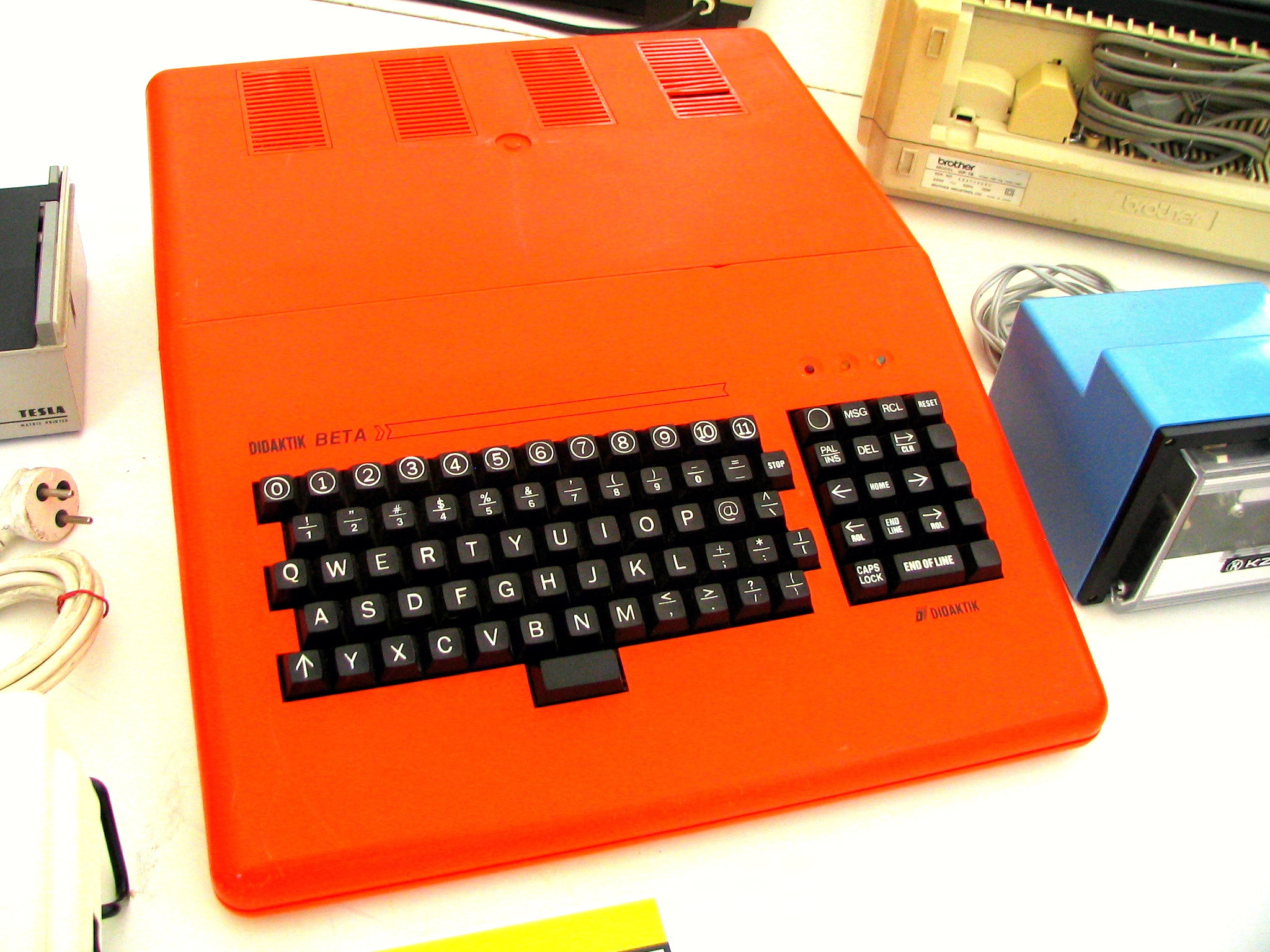
Didaktik Beta

Didaktik Beta was a slightly improved version of previous Didaktik Alfa, having almost identical hardware. Didaktik Alfa and Beta were mostly deployed in schools to replace older PMD 85 computers.

== Didaktik Gama ==
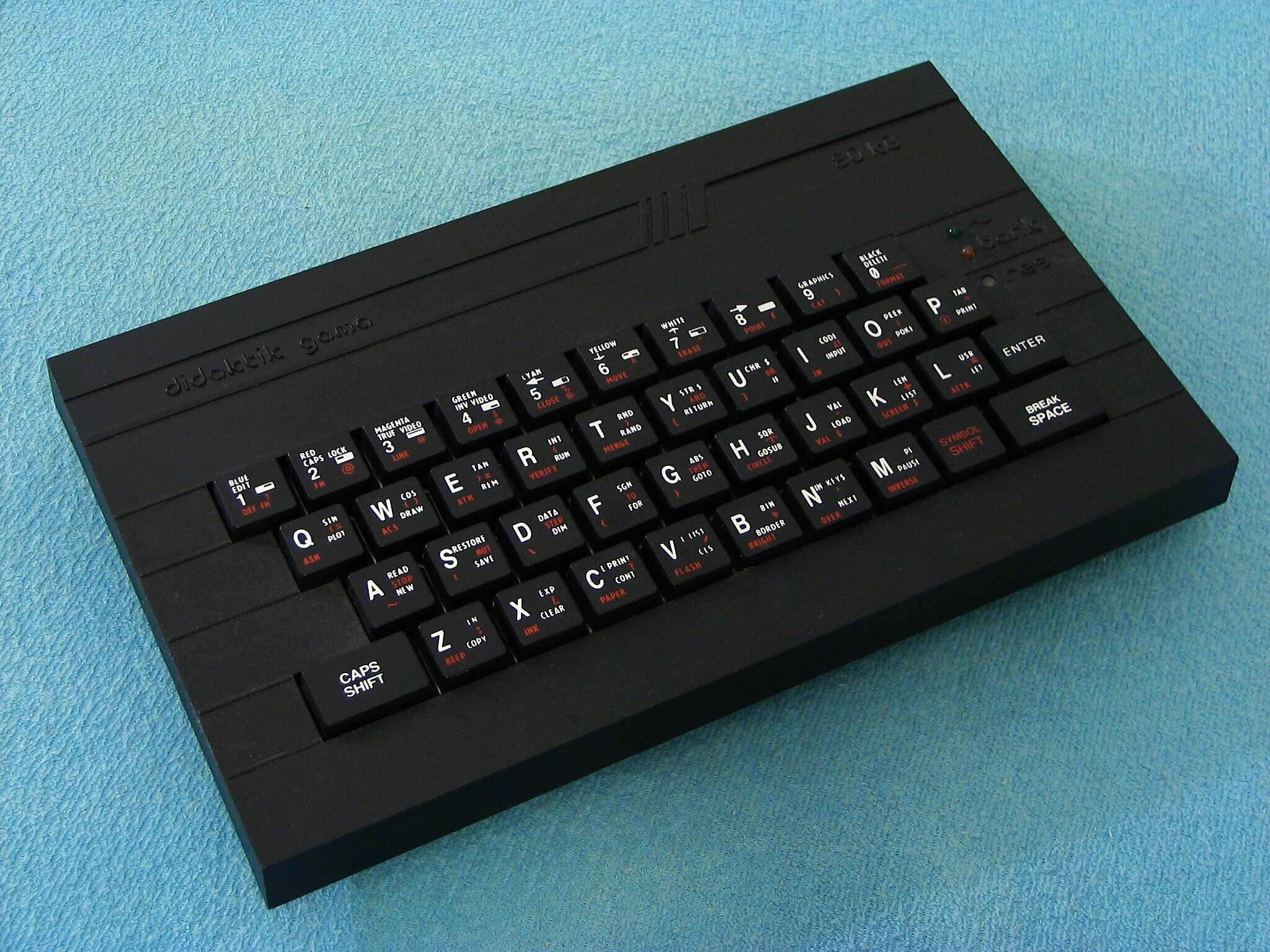
Didaktik Gama

Didaktik Gama was a ZX Spectrum clone with 80 KB RAM divided into two switched 32 KB memory banks and 16 KB of slower RAM containing graphical data for video output, while the size of ROM was 16 KB. A peripheral interface with a 8255 chip was added, providing centronics plotter and printer connections and a Kempston joystick port.

The case was similar to that of the ZX Spectrum+, a grey or black box in A5 size, with a flat plastic keyboard and connectors mounted on the rear side. The Gama uses a standard ULA chip made by Ferranti. All games developed for the ZX Spectrum 48K were generally compatible with this computer. An audio cassette was used as data storage and a TV served as a monitor. It is generally said the Gama was unreachable to buy and there were waiting lists several years long.

Didaktik Gama was produced in three variants: the first, Gama '87, fixed some bugs in the original ZX Spectrum ROM (thus breaking compatibility with some software) and introduced its own bugs effectively inhibiting the use of the second 32 KB memory bank from BASIC. Gama '88 fixed the original ZX Spectrum bugs in a more compatible way, and also fixed the memory switching bug. The final and the more compatible model was Gama '89.

The computer was expensive but available on the market and could be purchased in Czechoslovak currency outside specialized Tuzex stores, unlike other foreign home computers. Production of Didaktik Gama computers ceased in 1992.

== Didaktik M ==
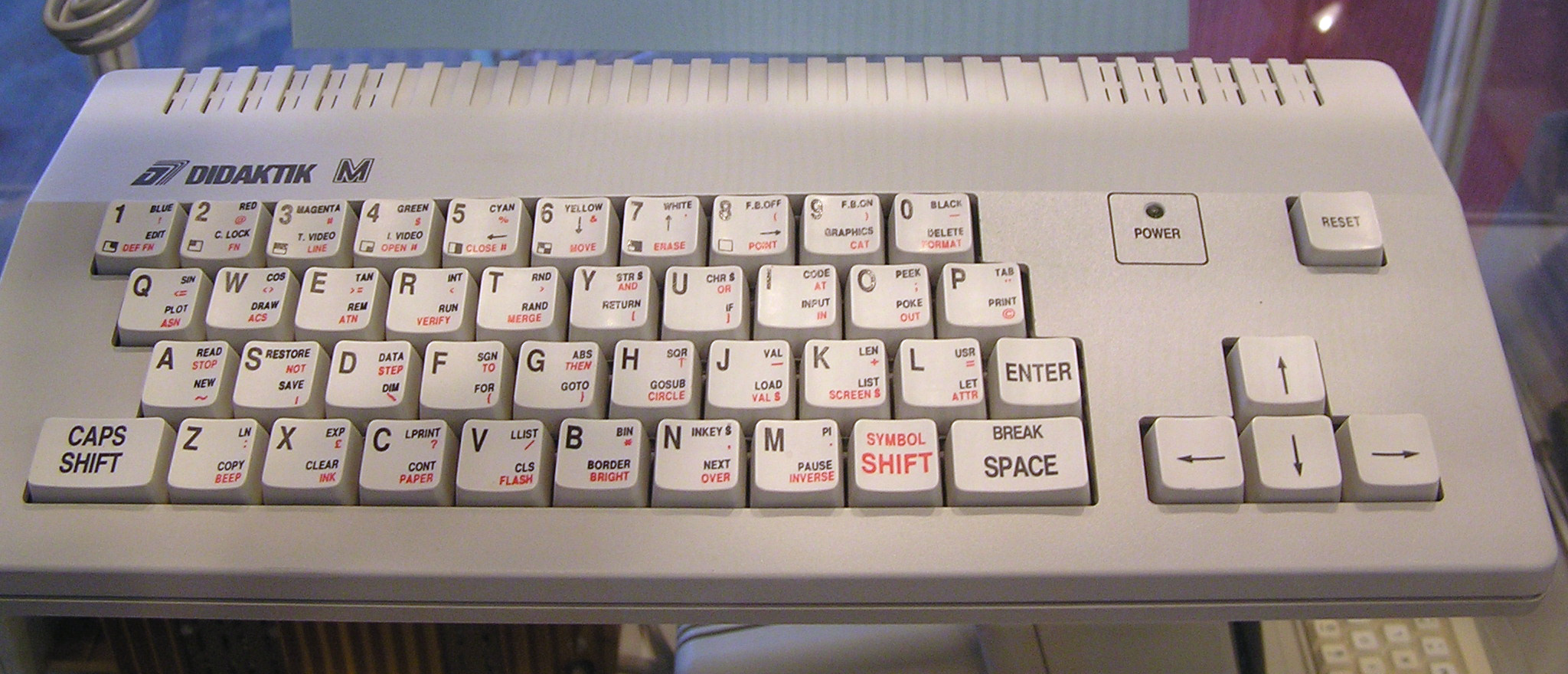
Didaktik M

The Didaktik M introduced in 1990, was more advanced in design and reliability than the Gama. The computer was considerably redesigned, the case was more modern, with an ergonomic-like shape and separate arrow keys.

Instead of the original ULA, a custom circuit from Russian company Angstrem was used, giving a square screen aspect ratio, instead of a typical 4:3 rectangle. In addition, the whole RAM was implemented by a single set of 64 KB chips, from which only 48 KB were used. There was no difference between fast and slow memory regarding video content. System timings were different to the original ZX Spectrum, which prevented some software from correctly displaying timing dependent visual effects. Though this didn't significantly affect majority of games or regular software, it could negatively impact demos which would be employing more advanced visual techniques.

Unlike the original ZX Spectrum, Didaktik M already provided two builtin connectors for joysticks. For this, the computer included own integrated Kempston and Sinclair interfaces (each with one dedicated port). These ports were hard-wired to the interfaces, so it was not possible to switch to e.g. a "Sinclair Left + Sinclair Right" layout (as would be seen on a real ZX Interface 2), the available Sinclair joystick port was always mapped to what would be the "Sinclair Right" or "Interface 2 Right" joystick in games and the "Kempston joystick" was then present on the other dedicated port (even thought the actual joystick hardware was the same and joysticks could be plugged to either of the ports interchangeably). Unfortunately, these ports were direct PCB edge connectors - therefore physically incompatible with any typical Atari-style joystick on the market at the time.

Locally, Kovodružstvo Náchod and Didaktik Skalica manufactured joysticks with connectors directly compatible with Didaktik M joystick ports. As the ports were otherwise pin-to-pin compatible with the Atari standard, it was relatively common to owners to create or buy an inexpensive DYI adapter to allow connection of any typical Atari 2600 / ZX Spectrum / C64 compatible joystick (the locally produced joysticks were not highly regarded for their build quality or ergonomics). Essentially, the adapter would just wire the edge connectors pins into standard 9-pin D-sub ports, which were left out of the Didaktik M design due to cost saving measures, adding the "missing" D-sub connector onto an edge connector. This would also provide much necessary protection as frequent insertions and removals of an original joystick would wear down the edge connector significantly, or could even lead to breaking off part of the PCB during less careful manipulation.

A 5.25-inch floppy disk drive, called D40, was introduced in 1992 and featured a "Snapshot" (see hibernation) button that stored the current memory contents on diskette. It was then possible to later load this memory image and continue the software from its previous state.

A 3.5-inch floppy disk drive, called D80, was also introduced later in 1992, simultaneously to the release of the Didaktik Kompakt.

== Didaktik Kompakt ==
The Didaktik Kompakt from 1992 was basically a Didaktik M with a built-in 3.5-inch 720 KB floppy drive and a parallel printer port. It also incorporated the internal updates of the previous Didaktik M revisions and added own minor updates (such as a redesigned motherboard, or addition of RGB SCART output).
