= Matoš =

Matoš is a Croatian surname. Notable people with the surname include:

- Antun Gustav Matoš (1873–1914), Croatian writer
- Marin Matoš (born 1989), Croatian footballer
