= Silvia Matos =

Spanish businesswoman, and transgender rights activist (born 1988)

- Born: January 12, 1988 (age 38); Las Palmas, Gran Canaria, Canary Islands

Silvia Matos (born 12 January 1988, Las Palmas de Gran Canaria) is a Spanish businesswoman, communicator, lingerie designer, and transgender rights activist.

== Life and career ==
At the age of 17, Silvia Matos moved to Madrid to study fashion design. After finishing her degree, she faced strong industry discrimination due to her gender identity and physical appearance. In addition to the changes, her physical appearance and name did not match her national identity document.

After this experience and discovering that she could not find women's lingerie that fit her properly, she launched the online store Translingerie in 2014, which specialized in lingerie for trans women. She started selling these garments to her friends and later expanded to physical stores in countries such as Norway, Germany, France, and the United Kingdom, as well as across Spain (including in Tenerife, Gran Canaria, Lanzarote, Pamplona and Bilbao). Translingerie also launched a line of underwear for trans children and teenagers.

In July 2021, she appointed president of the TransGirls Association, which ensures the rights and equality of trans women. Matos eventually relieved Yuli Pérez as founder of the association.

In October 2022, she was godmother of the first national gala of Miss Trans Spain in Madrid, the winner of which would represent Spain in Miss International Queen.
