= Calvão (Vagos) =

- Civil parish
- Location in Portugal
- Coordinates: 40.4756°N 8.69722°W
- Country: Portugal
- Region: Centro
- Intermunic. comm.: Região de Aveiro
- District: Aveiro
- Municipality: Vagos

Area
  - Total: 14.84 km^{2} (5.73 sq mi)

Population (2011)
  - Total: 2,014
  - Density: 135.7/km^{2} (351.5/sq mi)
- Time zone: UTC+00:00 (WET)
  - Summer (DST): UTC+01:00 (WEST)

Calvão is a parish in Vagos Municipality, Portugal. This village belongs to the Aveiro District near the sea coast, in the Centro Region of the country. The population in 2011 was 2,014, in an area of 14.84 km^{2}.

== Notable residents ==
- Guilherme Matos
