= Guilherme Matos =

Portuguese footballer (born 1994)

Personal information
- Full name: Guilherme Venâncio Matos
- Date of birth: 14 February 1994 (age 32)
- Place of birth: Calvão, Portugal
- Height: 1.74 m (5 ft 9 in)
- Positions: Midfielder; left-back

Team information
- Current team: JuveForce

Youth career
- 2003–2005: Covão do Lobo
- 2005–2006: Taboeira
- 2006–2011: Benfica
- 2011–2012: União Leiria
- 2012–2013: Beira-Mar

Senior career*
Years	Team	Apps	(Gls)
2013–2015	Beira-Mar	3	(0)
2014	→ Oliveira do Bairro (loan)	14	(5)
2014–2015	→ Gafanha (loan)	16	(2)
2015–2016	Gafanha	15	(0)
2016–2018	Vista Alegre	26	(1)
2018—2019	Beira-Mar	1	(0)
2019	→ JuveForce (loan)	0	(0)
2021	C.D. Luso	0	(0)
2019—	JuveForce	6	(1)

International career
2009–2010	Portugal U16	7	(1)
2011	Portugal U18	1	(0)
- * Club domestic league appearances and goals as of 16 November 2021

Guilherme Venâncio Matos (born 14 February 1994) is a Portuguese footballer who plays for JuveForce as a midfielder.

== Career ==
Matos was born in Calvão. He played in five youth leagues: Covão do Lobo (2003–2005), Taboeira (2005–2006), Benfica (2006–2011), União Leiria (2011–2012), and Beira-Mar (2012–2013). While in youth football, he played on the national Portugal U16 team in 2009–2010 and on the national Portugal U18 team in 2011.

Matos signed with Beira-Mar professionally 2013-2015 and made his professional debut in January 2014 in a 2013–14 Taça da Liga match against Braga, when he started and played the full game. Shortly after, he was loaned to Oliveira do Bairro for 2014 and to Gafanha for 2014—2015. He subsequently signed with Gafanha for the 2015—2016 season before moving on to Vista Alegre (2016–2018). He returned to Beira-Mar for the 2018—2019 season before being traded to and signing with JuveForce. In 2021, he was loaned briefly to C.D. Luso, but returned to JuveForce by the start of the 2021—2022 season.
