= Daverson Matos =

Brazilian politician (born 1993)

- Matos in 2025

Member of the Legislative Assembly of Mato Grosso do Sul
- Incumbent
- Assumed office 1 February 2027

Personal details
- Born: 31 August 1993 (age 33)
- Party: Liberal Party

Daverson Munhoz de Matos (born 31 August 1993) is a Brazilian politician who was elected member of the Legislative Assembly of Mato Grosso do Sul in 2026. He has been a municipal councillor of Rio Brilhante since 2025.
