= Renan (footballer, born May 1985) =

Brazilian footballer

Personal information
- Full name: Marcos Renan de Mattos Ceschin
- Date of birth: 12 May 1985 (age 41)
- Place of birth: Curitiba, Brazil
- Height: 1.78 m (5 ft 10 in)
- Position: Attacking midfielder

Team information
- Current team: Panachaiki

Youth career
- 2003–2004: Coritiba

Senior career*
Years	Team	Apps	(Gls)
2005–2006	Coritiba	27	(12)
2006–2007	Paraná	25	(2)
2008	Associação Atlética Ponte Preta	2	(2)
2009	Panachaiki	19	(4)
2010	Deportivo Anzoátegui	14	(2)
2009	PonteVedra CF Spain	2	(1)
- * Club domestic league appearances and goals as of 6 January 2009

Marcos Renan de Mattos Ceschin (born 12 May 1985 in Curitiba), or simply Renan, is a Brazilian former footnaller who played as an attacking midfielder.

Renan played for Coritiba, Paraná, Ponte Preta, Panachaiki, Pontevedra FC and Deportivo Anzoátegui.

== Honours ==
- Campeonato Paranaense: 2003, 2004, 2005, 2006, 2007
- Campeonato Paulista: 2008 Vice- Campeão
