= Gregório de Matos =

Portuguese poet and lawyer

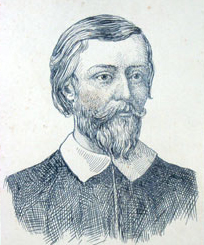
- A drawing of Gregório de Matos
- Born: Gregório de Matos e Guerra; 23 December 1636; Salvador, Bahia, Portuguese Brazil
- Died: 26 November 1696 (aged 59); Recife, Pernambuco, Portuguese Brazil
- Education: University of Coimbra
- Occupations: Poet, lawyer
- Spouse(s): Michaella de Andrade, Maria dos Povos
- Relatives: Eusébio de Matos
- Writing career
- Pen name: Boca do Inferno
- Subject: Satires
- Literary movement: Baroque

Gregório de Matos e Guerra (December 23, 1636 – November 26, 1696) was a famous Portuguese Baroque poet from Colonial Brazil. He has been described as "founder of Brazilian literature." Although he wrote many lyrical and religious poems, he was better known for his satirical ones, most of them criticizing the Catholic Church, earning him the nickname "Boca do Inferno" (Hell's Mouth).

He is the patron of the 16th chair of the Brazilian Academy of Letters.

== Biography ==
Gregório de Matos e Guerra was born in Salvador, Bahia, to Gregório de Matos (a Portuguese nobleman) and Maria da Guerra. He studied at the Jesuit College and travelled to Lisbon in 1652, entering the University of Coimbra, where he completed his law degree in 1661. There he became friends with poet Tomás Pinto Brandão (1664–1743) and married D. Michaella de Andrade, and, two years later, was appointed as a magistrate in Alcácer do Sal. In 1672, he served as solicitor for the city of Bahia to the Portuguese court.

In 1679, he returned to Brazil, as a widower. He was married for a second time in 1691 to Maria dos Povos, but led a rather bohemian life. A malcontent, he criticized everyone and everything: the church, government and all classes of people, from the rich and powerful to the lowly pauper, sparing no race or profession. His irreverent and satiric writings eventually got him into trouble, and Gregório was exiled to Portuguese Angola in 1694, where he contracted a lethal disease. Very ill, he managed to return to Brazil the following year, but he was prohibited from entering Bahia and from distributing his poetry. He instead went to Recife, where he died in 1696.

Tradition says that a few minutes before death, he asked two Catholic priests to come at him and stand each one aside of his body; thus he described himself as "dying between two thieves, like Jesus Christ in his crucifixion". Which is probably unreal, because near to his death, "Gregorio de Matos" expressed guilt and regret regarding his relationship with the Catholic Church. Through his works "Seeking Christ" and "Christ Crucified", where he seeks to demonstrate "the insignificance of man before God", where he perceives, on his part, the clear conscience of sin and the search for forgiveness. In these moments of poignant repentance, Gregory makes explicit his religious knowledge, contrasting the ideas of God and of sin, opposite and, at the same time, complementary: God, although holding the power of condemnation of souls, clearly allows man's hope in save by His forgiveness, by virtue of His infinite mercy and goodness.

His older brother was the painter and orator Eusébio de Matos (1629–1692).

== Works ==
The works of Gregório de Matos were not published or more well known until the 19th century. This was because of the heavy content of his satires. During his lifetime, his poetry could only be found in private diaries and codices.

The Brazilian Academy of Letters published a collection of his poetry in six volumes:

- Sacra (Holy — volume 1, 1923)
- Lírica (Lyrical — volume 2, 1923)
- Graciosa (Gracious — volume 3, 1930)
- Satírica (Satirical — volumes 4-5, 1930)
- Última (Last — volume 6, 1933)

== Bibliography ==
- Rocha Peres, Fernando da (1989). "Gregório de Matos". In Solé, Carlos A. (ed.). Latin American Writers. Macmillan Publishing House. pp. 65–69. ISBN 0684185970.

Preceded by New creation	Brazilian Academy of Letters - Patron of the 16th chair	Succeeded by Araripe Júnior (founder)
