= Marcelinho (footballer, born 1986) =

Brazilian footballer

Personal information
- Full name: Marcelo Roberto Lima de Mattos
- Date of birth: October 24, 1986 (age 40)
- Place of birth: Palmital, Brazil
- Height: 1.64 m (5 ft 5 in)
- Position: Attacking midfielder

Youth career
- 2002–2005: Atlético-PR

Senior career*
Years	Team	Apps	(Gls)
2006	→ Figueirense (loan)	1	(0)
2006	→ Engenheiro Beltrão (loan)		
2006–2008	Atlético-PR		
2007	→ Atlético Sorocaba (loan)		
2008	→ Náutico (loan)		
2008	J. Malucelli		
2009	Criciúma		
2009	Campinense	17	(4)
2010	Operário Ferroviário		
2010	Legião		
2011	Araripina	19	(1)
2012	Ferroviário-CE	15	(2)
2012	Vitória das Tabocas		
2013	Esportiva Patrocinense		
2014	ASSU	5	(0)
2014	CRAC-GO	10	(2)
2014	Inter de Lages	0	(0)
2014–2015	Qormi	14	(2)
2016	Cascavel	7	(0)
- * Club domestic league appearances and goals

Marcelo Roberto Lima de Mattos (born October 24, 1986), known as Marcelinho, is a Brazilian former professional footballer who played as an attacking midfielder.

== Honours ==
- Santa Catarina State League: 2006
