= List of video games developed in Slovakia =

This is a list of released and upcoming video games that are developed in Slovakia. The list is sorted by game title, platform, year of release and their developer. This list does not include serious games.

Title	Genre	Platform	Year	Developer	Notes
Towdie	Platform Adventure game	ZX Spectrum	1994	DSA Computer Graphix	
Quadrax	Puzzle video game	ZX Spectrum, DOS	1994	Cauldron	
Anatema: Legenda o prekliati	Adventure game	DOS	1995	Rune Software	
Ramonovo Kouzlo	Adventure game	DOS	1996	Riki Computer Games	
Mutation of J.B.	Adventure game	DOS	1996	Invention	
Shadow of the Devil	Adventure game	Amiga	1996	Riki Computer Games	
Revolt of Don's Knights	Role-playing video game	DOS	1996	Emerald Software	
Spellcross	Turn-based strategy	DOS	1997	Cauldron HQ	
The Strangers	Action game, Beat 'em up, Side-scroller	Amiga	1997	Ablaze	
Napalm: The Crimson Crisis	Realtime strategy game	Amiga	1999	Ablaze, clickBOOM	1st Command & Conquer: RA like title on Amiga.
Battle Isle: The Andosia War	Turn-based strategy	Windows	2000	Cauldron	
State of War	Realtime strategy game	Windows	2001	Cypron Studios	
Necromania: Trap of Darkness	Role-playing video game	Windows	2002	Darksoft Game Development Studio	
Chaser	First-person shooter	Windows	2003	Cauldron	
State of War: Warmonger	Realtime strategy game	Windows	2003	Cypron Studios	
Conan	Action-adventure game	Windows, Xbox, PlayStation 2, GameCube	2004	Cauldron	
Chameleon	Stealth game	Windows	2005	Illusion Softworks	
Gene Troopers	First-person shooter	Windows, PlayStation 2, Xbox	2005	Cauldron	
Knights of the Temple II	Action-adventure game	Windows, PlayStation 2, Xbox	2005	Cauldron	
Kult: Heretic Kingdoms	Role-playing video game	Windows	2005	3D People	
Air Conflicts	Simulation video game	Windows	2006	3Division Entertainment	
The History Channel: Civil War – A Nation Divided	First-person shooter	Windows, PlayStation 2, Xbox 360	2006	Cauldron	
Gods: Lands of Infinity	Turn-based RPG	Windows	2006	Cypron Studios	
Attack on Pearl Harbor	Simulation video game	Windows	2007	3Division	
The History Channel: Battle for the Pacific	First-person shooter	Windows, PlayStation 3, Xbox 360	2007	Cauldron	
Soldier of Fortune: Payback	First-person shooter	Windows, PlayStation 3, Xbox 360	2007	Cauldron	
Gods: Lands of Infinity: Special Edition	Turn-based RPG	Windows	2007	Cypron Studios	Special version of Gods: Lands of Infinity
State of War 2: Arcon	Realtime strategy game	Windows	2007	Cypron Studios	
History Civil War: Secret Missions	First-person shooter	Windows, PlayStation 2, PlayStation 3, Xbox 360	2008	Cauldron	
Priority: Survive	Realtime strategy game	Windows	2008	Distortum	Like StarCraft & Alien franchise.
Secret Service	First-person shooter	Windows, PlayStation 2, Xbox 360	2008	Cauldron	
Air Conflicts: Aces of World War II	Simulation video game	Windows, PlayStation 3, Xbox 360	2009	Games Farm	
Cabela's Big Game Hunter 2010	Simulation video game	PlayStation 3, Xbox 360, Nintendo Wii	2009	Cauldron	
Jurassic: The Hunted	First-person shooter	PlayStation 2, PlayStation 3, Xbox 360	2009	Cauldron	
Jagged Alliance	Turn-based tactics	Nintendo DS	2009	Cypronia	Nintendo DS adaptation of 1995 game
Ancient Trader	Turn-based strategy	Windows, Xbox 360, IOS	2010	Antworld	
Aqua	Arcade game	Windows, Xbox 360	2010	Games Distillery	
Cabela's Dangerous Hunts 2011	First-person shooter	PlayStation 3, Xbox 360, Nintendo Wii	2010	Cauldron	
Pearl Harbor Trilogy – 1941: Red Sun Rising	Simulation video game	WiiWare	2010	Arcade Moon, Legendo Entertainment	Remake of Attack on Pearl Harbor
Air Conflicts: Secret Wars	Simulation video game	Windows, PlayStation 3, Xbox 360	2011	Games Farm	
Cabela's Adventure Camp	Arcade game	PlayStation Move	2011	Cauldron	
Cabela's Big Game Hunter 2012	Simulation video game	PlayStation 3, Xbox 360, Nintendo Wii	2011	Cauldron	
Air Conflicts: Pacific Carriers	Simulation video game	Windows, PlayStation 3, Xbox 360	2012	Games Farm	
Cabela's Dangerous Hunts 2013	Simulation video game	Windows, PlayStation 3, Xbox 360, Nintendo Wii	2012	Cauldron	
Air Conflicts: Vietnam	Simulation video game	Windows, PlayStation 3, Xbox 360	2013	Games Farm	
Citadels	Realtime strategy game	Windows	2013	Games Distillery	
Gomo	Adventure game	Windows	2013	FishCow Games	
Cabela's Big Game Hunter: Pro Hunts	Simulation video game	Windows, PlayStation 3, Xbox 360, Nintendo Wii	2014	Cauldron	
Shadows: Heretic Kingdoms	Role-playing video game	Windows	2014	Games Farm	
Cube Life: Island Survival	Survival game	Wii U	2015	Cypronia	
Rubik's Cube (video game)	Puzzle video game	Nintendo 3DS, Wii U	2016	Cypronia	
The House of Da Vinci	Adventure game, Puzzle video game	Windows, macOS, Nintendo Switch, Android, IOS	2017	Blue Brain Games, s.r.o.	First part of trilogy.
Vaporum	Role-playing video game, Dungeon crawl	Windows, Linux, macOS, PlayStation 4, Xbox One, Nintendo Switch	2017	Fatbot Games	Rare Slovak game to also be released for Linux and macOS computers.
Vikings: Wolves of Midgard	Role-playing video game	Windows	2017	Games Farm	
Pixel Action Heroes	Online First-person_shooter	Wii U	2017	Cypronia	
Shadows: Awakening	Role-playing video game	Windows, PlayStation 4, Xbox One	2018	Games Farm	First Slovak game to come to PS4-era consoles?
Blood Will Be Spilled	Action platformer	Windows	2019	Doublequote Studio	
The House of Da Vinci 2	Adventure game, Puzzle video game	Windows, macOS, Nintendo Switch, Android, IOS	2019	Blue Brain Games, s.r.o.	Middle part of trilogy.
Workers & Resources: Soviet Republic	City Builder, Sandbox video game	Windows	2019	3Division	Many buildings in-game are based on Soviet-Era constructions found in Košice, Slovakia
Ur Game: The Game of Ancient Gods	Digital tabletop game	Windows	2020	Bartoš Studio	Based on an ancient game.
Vaporum: Lockdown	Role-playing video game, Dungeon crawl	Windows, Linux, macOS, PlayStation 4, Xbox One, Nintendo Switch	2020	Fatbot Games	Prequel to Vaporum (2017).
YesterMorrow	Action platformer	Windows, macOS, PlayStation 4, Xbox One, Nintendo Switch	2020	Bitmap Galaxy	2D side-scrolling game.
Squabble	Action game	Nintendo Switch	2021	Atomic Realm	
Sacred Fire: A Role Playing Game	Role-playing video game	Windows	TBA	Poetic	Estimated release: 2025.
Carpe Diem Project	Survival game, Third-person shooter	Windows	2022	Papagaye	Zombie-infested post-apocalypse.
The House of Da Vinci 3	Adventure game, Puzzle video game	Windows, macOS, Nintendo Switch, Android	2022	Blue Brain Games, s.r.o.	Final part of trilogy.
Way of the Hunter	Simulation video game, First-person shooter	Windows	2022	Nine Rocks Games	
Life of Delta	Point-and-click adventure game	Windows, Linux, macOS, Nintendo Switch	2023	Airo Games	
ARTIFICIAL	First-person, Puzzle video game, Platform	Windows	2024	Ondrej Angelovic (Person)	Unity made game inspired by Portal (series) & Half-Life (series).
Circuit Legends	Racing game	Android	2024	Kunovsky Games Studio	Solo developed in Unity.
Colonize	City Builder, Survival game	Windows	2024	Rembrosoft	Early access.
Die by the Blade	Fighting game	Windows, PlayStation 4, Xbox One, PlayStation 5, Xbox Series X, Nintendo Switch	2024	Triple Hill Interactive, Grindstone, Toko Midori Games (Japanese)	Similar to Bushido Blade. First Slovak game to come to PS5-era consoles.
Forgotten but unbroken	Turn-based strategy	Windows	2024	Centurion Developments	Partially inspired by Silent Storm & XCOM.
The House of Tesla	Adventure game, Puzzle video game	Windows, macOS, Nintendo Switch, Android, IOS	2024	Blue Brain Games, s.r.o.	Based on activities of Nikola Tesla.
Felvidek	Role-playing video game	Windows	2024	Jozef Pavelka (brozef)	Set in 15th century Slovakia
Vivat Slovakia	Open world game, Action game	Windows	2025	Team Vivat	Set in dev's nation.
MEDIEVAL	Action-adventure	Windows, Xbox, PS5	TBA, 2026	Cypronia	Based on Medieval 2022 movie
Cold Engines	Realtime strategy game, Survival game	Windows	TBD	Lich Studios	
The House of Tesla 2	Adventure game, Puzzle video game	Windows, macOS, Nintendo Switch, Android, IOS	TBA	Blue Brain Games, s.r.o.	
The House of Tesla 3	Adventure game, Puzzle video game	Windows, macOS, Nintendo Switch, Android, IOS	TBA	Blue Brain Games, s.r.o.	
Outerra World Sandbox	Sandbox video game, Simulation video game	Windows	TBA	Outerra	
B-17 Flying Fortress The Bloody 100th	Simulation video game, Management sim	Windows	TBA	MicroProse Software, Outerra	Third main instalment in B-17 Flying Fortress video game series.

Cancelled titles
Title	Genre	Platform	Year	Developer	Notes
Elveon	Role-playing video game	Windows, PlayStation 3, Xbox 360	2017 (3rd cancellation)	10tacle Studios Slovakia	
Blacksmith Legends	Management sim, RPG, RTS	Windows	2022	VM Gaming Limited	EA title abandoned 2023.
