= Anathema (disambiguation) =

An anathema is a detested or shunned person or thing, or it may refer to formal excommunication from a church.

Anathema may also refer to:

- Anathema (film), a 2024 Spanish horror film
- Anathema (band), a British rock band 1990–2020
- "Anathema", a 2014 song by Anathema from Distant Satellites
- "Anathema", a 2011 song by Twenty One Pilots from Regional at Best
- Anathema, a Justice League enemy in DC comics

== See also ==
- Anatema: Legenda o prekliati, a 1995 video game
- "Anathea", a 1964 song by Judy Collins from Judy Collins 3
- Anathem, a 2008 novel by Neal Stephenson
- The Anathemata, a 1952 epic poem by David Jones
