= Slovak Game of the Year Awards =

Annual video game awards in Slovakia

- Current: Slovak Game of 2017
- Awarded for: Best video game titles developed in Slovakia
- Country: Slovakia
- First award: 2017

Slovak Game of the Year Awards (Czech: Slovenská hra roka) are annual awards that recognize accomplishments in video game development, first presented in 2017. It is presented as part of video game festival Fest Anča. It was launched as a counterpart to Czech Game of the Year Awards.

== 2017 ==
Nominations were announced on 24 June 2018 for four categories. Vaporum and The House of Da Vinc received four nominations and Vikings: Wolves of Midgard received one nomination. Maguss was also nominated in one category. Vikings: Wolves of Midgard was named the best Slovak game of 2017. It also received an award in the category of visual design. Vaporum won for best debut game and best game design.

- Slovak game of the year - Vikings: Wolves of Midgard by Games Farm
  - Nominated: Vaporum by Fatbot Games and The House of Da Vinci by Blue Brain Games
- The Best Debut Game - Vaporum by Fatbot Games
  - Nominated: The House of Da Vinci by Blue Brain Games and Maguss by Mawa
- Best Game Design - Vaporum by Fatbot Games
  - Nominated: Vikings: Wolves of Midgard by Games Farm and The House of Da Vinci by Blue Brain Games
- Best Visual Design - Vikings: Wolves of Midgard by Games Farm
  - Nominated: Vaporum by Fatbot Games and The House of Da Vinci by Blue Brain Games

== 2018 ==
The awards ceremony was held on 31 May 2019. The game of the year was Shadows: Awakening.

- Slovak game of the year - Shadows: Awakening by Games Farm
- Best PC/Console Game - Shadows: Awakening by Games Farm
- Best Mobile Game - Car Puzzler by Boris Zápotocký
- Honorable Mention for Mobile Game - The Legend of Janosik by Black Deer Games
- Player's Award - Shadows: Awakening by Games Farm
- The Best Debut Game - Hellmut: The Badass from Hell by Volcanic
- Honorable Mention for Game Debut - Loria by Erik Vinclav
- Best Visual Design - Hellmut: The Badass from Hell by Volcanic
- Honorable Mention for Visual Design - The Flood by Simple Ghost
- Best Game Design - Hellmut: The Badass from Hell by Volcanic

== 2019 ==
Nominations were announced on 13 March 2020. Nominated games included BonVoyage!, Blood willbBe Spilled, AreaZ, The Fallen Kings, The House of Da Vinci 2, Hrdina, Merge Poker, Ski Legends, Splash Wars, Tile Towers, Trainstation 2 and Vivat Sloboda. The ceremony was scheduled for 30 April - 2 May 2020, but was delayed due to the COVID-19 pandemic in Slovakia. The awards were held on 30 November 2020. Blood will be Spilled won four awards, including the main award.

- Slovak game of the year - Blood will be Spilled by Doublequote Studio
- Best PC/Console Game - Blood will be Spilled by Doublequote Studio
- Best Mobile Game - Train Station 2: Rail Strategy by Pixel Federation
- Sector.sk Award - Vivat Sloboda by Team Vivat
- The Best Debut Game - Blood will be Spilled by Doublequote Studio
- Best Visual Design - Blood will be Spilled by Doublequote Studio
- Best Game Design - Train Station 2: Rail Strategy by Pixel Federation
- Different view - Hrdina by Bartoš Studio
