= Video game award =

Award awarded computer and video games

Within the video game industry there are several awards that are given to individual video games, development studios, and other individuals to recognize their merit. Most video game awards are given out on an annual basis, celebrating the best games of the previous year. Most of these awards come from organizations directly within the industry, but there also exist several that come from broader media groups. In addition, many video game publications supply their own end of the year awards.

== Video game industry awards ==
=== BAFTA Gaming Awards ===
The British Academy Games Awards were launched in 2004 by the British Academy of Film and Television Arts (BAFTA) to recognize video games. Though some awards are limited to British-based developers, the bulk of the categories recognize gaming worldwide. BAFTA has also recognized important persons in the video game industry through BAFTA Fellowships, starting with Will Wright in 2007.

=== D.I.C.E. Awards ===
The Academy of Interactive Arts & Sciences (AIAS) is a non-profit group with membership made up of developers, artists, and other professional in the video game industry. They launched the Interactive Achievement Awards in 1998, and in 2002, after establishing the annual D.I.C.E. Summit (D.I.C.E. as a backronym for "Design Innovate Communicate Entertain"), renamed these as the D.I.C.E. Awards. Each year, the award nominees are selected by a panel of AIAS members, and winners are voted on by the full AIAS body. Among these awards includes induction of select individuals into the AIAS Hall of Fame, as well as recognition for Lifetime Achievement and Pioneer awards. Based on the Academy membership and voting methodology, the D.I.C.E. Awards is considered the main peer-based recognition within the video games industry compared to other major awards.

=== The Game Awards ===
The Game Awards were created in 2014 by Geoff Keighley, following the cancellation of the Spike Video Game Awards. Keighley desired to make an awards ceremony comparable to the Oscars for the video game industry, and worked with industry partners to establish the annual show. The show features not only awards but also several video game announcements and other entertainment, such as a live orchestra led by Lorne Balfe. The Game Awards are managed by an advisory panel made up from video game hardware manufacturers, and video game developers and publishers. Each year the panel selects a number of global video game magazines and websites to participate in the voting process. These journalists provide their nominees for each award category which are then tallied by the advisory committee. The journalists then vote from the nominees. There is also a 10% contribution for each category from online fan voting, held in the weeks prior to the ceremony.

=== Game Developers Choice Awards ===
The Game Developers Conference (GDC) was established in 1988 as more of a professional conference for game developers to present talks and sessions on their development work, and since has become closely associated with the International Game Developers Association which uses the annual conference for its own annual meetings. The conference itself is currently run by Informa. The Spotlight Awards were first introduced in 1997, but after 1999, these were transitioned to the Game Developers Choice Awards (GDCA) with the first ceremony at the 2001 GDC conference. Nominees are selected by the 500-some members of the International Choice Awards Network (ICAN), an invite-only group of leading game creators, as well as by the editors of the video game industry website Gamasutra; members are not to nominate games they are personally involved in. The top nominees in each category are then voted on by the whole of ICAN. The awards are given at a ceremony during the GDC conference. Recent years have also introduced an Audience award, with games nominated and voted on by attendees of the GDC. Among its awards include the GDCA Game of the Year award.

In addition to games and developers the GDCA may also award individuals its Lifetime Achievement Award, its Pioneer Award for early contributions that have impacted the video game industry, or its Ambassador Award for contributions to improve the community for video game development.

=== Golden Joystick Awards ===
The Golden Joystick Awards were established by a number of video game magazines in 1983 to hold an open public voting for winners in each category. Though initially only for British video game players, it later opened to voting from the global community through online voting. The winners are announced through a ceremony located in a London venue each year. Nominees for the award are selected by the awards' managing partners from games released in that year. These nominees are narrowed down to a shortlist which is then put up for public voting. Winners are selected directly from the results of this voting period.

=== Independent Games Festival ===
A separate event at the Game Developers Conference is the Independent Games Festival (IGF) which highlights games produced from independent video game development, which also includes games developed by students in video game development programs at universities. Independent developers can submit their game, at any state of development as long as it is playable, for consideration to the IGF with a small fee. A committee of about 300 members selected from the video game industry then review the submitted games and provide nominations to the various categories. A smaller committee of about fifteen members then create a shortlist of nominees for each category, including honorable mentions. These nominees are then expected to present at booth space for the IGF during the GDC event, with the developers given discounts for attending the conference. A separate jury uses the IGF event to make their final selection of the winner. The IGF winners are announced during the GDC, typically right before the GDCA awards. Among its awards include the Seumas McNally Grand Prize, the top prize named after Seumas McNally, and which includes a US$30,000 for the winning game.

=== NAVGTR Awards ===
The National Academy of Video Game Trade Reviewers (NAVGTR), an organization of video game journalists, established the NAVGTR Awards in 2001 to award the best games of the year in several categories as determined by members of NAVGTR.

=== New York Game Awards ===
The New York Game Awards were established in 2011 by the non-profit organization, the New York Videogame Critics Circle established by both mainstream and industry-specific journalists in New York City that cover video games.

=== Steam Awards ===
The Steam Awards are organized by Valve as part of the Steam storefront since 2016. Valve allows users to nominate any game for the categories, and then complies the shortlist of nominees in each entry which are then presented to users for voting.

== Regional awards ==
=== Asia ===
==== China ====
The Ultra Game Awards is an annual awards ceremony recognizing video games from around the world. It was formerly known as the TV Game Awards and the UCG Game Awards. Its inaugural event took place in 2007. The ceremony has its awards organized into three main sections: Game of the Year, Independent Game, and Players' Voice. The winners are decided by player and media voting across China.

==== Japan ====
Launched in 1996 as the Computer Entertainment Supplier's Association (CESA) Awards, the Japan Game Awards became the awards vehicle for the Japanese government's Ministry of Economy, Trade and Industry since 2006 to recognize video game achievement in Japan. Potential winners are not limited to Japanese-developed games.

==== South Korea ====
The Korea Game Awards were established in 1996 to highlight individuals and game companies that contribute significantly to the Korean game industry. It is currently presented by the Ministry of Culture, Sports and Tourism.

=== Canada ===
The Canadian Game Awards were established in 2020 to honor the Canadian video game industry, and highlight the scale it operates at as one of the largest producers of games in the world. It is a reboot of the Canadian Videogame Awards, which ran from 2010 to 2016.

=== Europe ===
==== Central & Eastern Europe ====
The Central & Eastern European Game Awards were established in 2018 as a collaborative project between game industry organizations from Central and Eastern Europe to honor games and studios developed in the region. The countries involved in the awards are Belarus, Bulgaria, Croatia, the Czech Republic, Georgia, Hungary, Latvia, Lithuania, Moldova, North Macedonia, Poland, Romania, Serbia, Slovakia, Slovenia, and Ukraine.

==== Czech Republic ====
The Czech Game of the Year Awards were established in 2010, originally as part of the Gameday Festival to recognize video game achievement for those within Czech Republic. Through 2017, these awards also recognized contributions from Slovakia, but these were split out into the separate Slovak Game of the Year Awards.

==== Denmark ====
The Spilprisen was established in 2013 by the Danish Producers Association to highlight games developed in Denmark. For 2025, the Danish games industry organized around Games Denmark, who took over administration of the awards from the DPA. At the 2025 awards, 10 awards were announced, which includes one audience award for Denmark's Favorite Game. Spilprisen also names outstanding new individuals within the Danish games industry as Talents of the Year, which can come from any facet of the video games industry.

==== France ====
The Pégases is the annual awards ceremony organized by the French Academy of Video Game Arts and Techniques. The inaugural ceremony was held in 2020 in Paris. At the event, 18 awards are bestowed. 16 of them honor games released in the previous calendar year, while the remaining 2 are honorary prizes presented to individuals for their contributions to the industry. Beyond the recipients of the latter two recognitions and the Pégase for the "Best Student Video Game" category (these 3 are specifically decided by the elected members of the Steering Committee administering the academy), the 15 other winners are decided via votes by all members of the academy, most of whom are industry professionals.

==== Germany ====
The Deutscher Computerspielpreis (German computer games award) was established in 2009 to recognize video game achievement for games developed within Germany.

The Deutscher Entwicklerpreis is an award for video game development for German studios. The awards began in 2004 and are held annually in Cologne.

==== Slovakia ====
The Slovak Game of the Year Awards were established in 2017 as a separate event from the Czech Game of the Year Awards, to recognize achievement in video games for those specifically from Slovakia.

==== Sweden ====
The Swedish Game Awards were established in 2002 by a non-profit organization based at KTH Royal Institute of Technology to recognize the best Swedish-made video games.

=== United Kingdom (Britain) ===
The Independent Game Developers' Association (TIGA) is a United Kingdom-based organization promoting independently developed games. Since 2011, it has run The Independent Game Developers' Association Awards or TIGA Awards for independent games. Most categories are open to any independent game, while some categories are limited to games developed by members of TIGA.

== Other media awards ==
=== Annie Awards ===
The Annie Awards, managed by the non-profit group ASIFA-Hollywood, celebrate achievement in animation. The awards added the Annie Award for Best Animated Video Game category in 2005 to recognized animation achievement in video games.

=== Apple Design Awards ===
The Apple Design Awards are award by Apple, Inc. for mobile apps on its iOS family of devices to recognize the most innovative apps developed from independent firms and which make best use of their hardware. These awards include productivity and other applications in addition to mobile video games.

=== ATOM Awards ===
The Australian Teachers of Media (ATOM) established the ATOM Awards in 1982 to recognize works in media from professionals, educators, and students in Australia and New Zealand. Any developer from these countries can submit a game for consideration, with winners selected by a panel of judges of ATOM members. The awards added categories for interactive works including video games in 2007.

=== British Academy of Film and Television Arts ===
The British Academy of Film and Television Arts (BAFTA) originally ran the BAFTA Interactive Entertainment Awards from 1998 to 2003. The awards were reorganized into two separate groups starting in 2004: the BAFTA Interactive Awards for interactive works, which ran for only two years to 2005, and the ongoing British Academy Games Awards for video games. The British Academy Games Awards recognize works from across the global video game industry, but includes specific achievements for British-based games and developers.

BAFTA will also recognize individuals in the video game industry through a BAFTA Fellowship for "outstanding achievement in the art forms of the moving image".

=== GLAAD Media Awards ===
The GLAAD Media Awards are given to works and people that have helped to positively present LGBTQ issues. In 2018, GLAAD added a Media Award for Outstanding Video Game to recognize positive LGBTQ representation in video games.

=== Grammy Awards ===
The Grammy Awards are given across a broad set of music-related categories. Prior to 2023, there was not any specific video game themed category though in 2011, "Baba Yetu", the theme song for Civilization IV composed by Christopher Tin, won for Best Arrangement, Instrumental and Vocals, the first piece of video game-related music to win a Grammy. Journey's soundtrack had been nominated for the 2013 Grammy award for Best Score Soundtrack for Visual Media but did not win. By 2023, the Grammys added a new category, Grammy Award for Best Score Soundtrack for Video Games and Other Interactive Media, specifically designed to honor video game music.

=== Hugo Awards ===
The Hugo Award is an annual award for the best science fiction or fantasy works, given in multiple categories, predominantly literature but with some categories for visual media. In 2006, a proposal for a game category, titled Best Interactive Video Game, was made but did not receive enough nominations. In 2021, the Hugo Award for Best Game or Interactive Work was introduced as a one-off category, and was established as an annual category in 2024.

=== Nickelodeon Kids' Choice Awards ===
The Nickelodeon Kids' Choice Awards established a Favorite Video Game award in 1995 as part of their program. Like the other awards in this ceremony, the winner is selected by open polling from children from a poll of nominees created by the Nickelodeon network.

=== Satellite Awards ===
The Satellite Awards are given by the International Press Academy made up from members from entertainment journalism to recognize the best works in film and television. The awards were expanded in 2004 to include interactive works, which included video games.

== Media outlets ==
Many video game websites compile their own awards for top games each year, selected by staff members. This is a reliable fixture in the games press each December. Some websites, like IGN, subdivide their awards by video game genre, whereas others, like Giant Bomb, focus more on individual writers' "Top 10" lists.

== Defunct awards ==
=== Canadian Awards for the Electronic & Animated Arts ===
The Canadian Awards for the Electronic & Animated Arts were created in 2006 to recognize achievement in Canada's video game and animation industry.

=== Game Critics Awards ===
The Game Critics Awards are awarded to games shown during the annual E3 event, chosen by a panel of video game journalists but otherwise having no association with E3 or its organizers the Entertainment Software Association. These awards are based on the state of games shown during E3 which may not be ready for release, and generally reflect those games that have the most promise as judged by the journalists. Since the cancellation of E3 in 2020, the event was not held again.

=== Gamers' Choice Awards ===
The Gamers' Choice Awards was a onetime fan-voted ceremony which was produced by the executive producer of the Teen Choice Awards on December 3, 2018 from the Fonda Theater in Los Angeles, then broadcast on CBS on December 9 before or after the day's NFL on CBS game (depending on time zone) within the CBS Sports Spectacular as a time-buy event, meaning CBS had no editorial control over the event. Two nomination specials in the weeks leading up to the main ceremony also aired. Fortnite won the top "Fan Favorite Game" award.

=== G-Phoria ===
G-Phoria was an annual awards show run on G4 from 2003 to 2009. While initially a panel-select set of awards, the show transitioned to become part of Adam Sessler's X-Play show in 2006, transitioning to a fan-voted event, before it was ultimately folded into X-Play's year-end awards.

=== International Mobile Gaming Awards ===
The International Mobile Gaming Awards were established in 2004 to recognize achievement in mobile video games. To date, The 16th award ceremony, held in 2020, has currently been the last official event.

=== SXSW Gaming Awards ===
The annual South by Southwest (SXSW) event in Austin, Texas celebrates several forms of art across concurrent conferences arranged around film, music, and other media. While video games had been part of the SXSW Interactive tracts earlier, a dedicated SXSW Gaming tract was added in 2013, and in the following year, establishment of the SXSW Gaming Awards similar to awards in the other media tracts. Developers and publishers can submit their games that had been released in final retail or online form in the prior year to the SXSW event organizers. The organizers along with a panel of video game industry advisers create nominee shortlists from these submitted games, which are then subsequently voted on by attendees of the SXSW Gaming tract and online voting. The winners are named at the end of the SXSW event.

=== Spike Video Games Awards ===
The Spike Video Game Awards (VGA) were established by Spike TV in 2003 and ran annually through 2013. The show, until 2013, was broadcast on the Spike TV network with host Geoff Keighley, who had helped to establish the framework of the awards. An advisory panel of twenty video game journalists made the nominees and selection of the winner for each show. In 2013, Spike opted to rename the show as the "VGX" and broadcast it only online, a change that Keighley felt harmed the show. Following the 2013 show, Keighley and Spike agreed to terminate the awards; Keighley went on to establish the Game Awards as an all-new event in 2014.

=== Walk of Game ===
The Walk of Game was located at the Metreon in San Francisco, California, modeled after the Hollywood Walk of Fame. It was started in 2005 with support from Sony to award public-voted video game characters and individuals, with the winners getting a star embedded in the floor. In 2006, Sony sold off the Metreon, and no further updates were made to the Walk of Game, and which was ultimately torn out in 2012.

=== Writers Guild of America Awards ===
The Writers Guild of America Awards are awarded by the Writers Guild of America to various forms of media based on excellence in the work's writing. An Outstanding Achievement in Video Game Writing award was created as part of this in 2008.

=== Former awards from media outlets ===
In addition to the above, several media outlets that gave video game awards have since gone default themselves or have dropped their awards. These include:

- Inside Gaming

== See also ==
- Game of the Year
