= Napalm (disambiguation) =

Napalm is an incendiary mixture of a gelling agent and a volatile petrochemical.

Napalm may also refer to:

== Media ==
=== Video Games ===
- NAM (video game) (also Napalm), a 1998 first-person shooter
- Napalm: The Crimson Crisis (also Napalm), a 1999 real-time strategy for Amiga

=== Music ===
- Napalm (album), by Xzibit, 2012
- Napalm Records, an Austrian independent record label

== See also ==
- Nai Palm (born 1989), Australian neo soul musician
