= Gyro13 =

2011 video game

- Developer: Cinemax
- Engine: Unreal Engine 3
- Platforms: iOS, Microsoft Windows
- Release: iOS: September 21, 2011; Windows: TBA 2015
- Genres: Action video game, Puzzle video game
- Mode: Single player

Gyro13 (fullname Gyro13: Steam Copter Arcade HD) is a video game developed by Czech company Cinemax. It is a physics-based helicopter arcade game. The game features full HD graphics. It was released for iOS in 2011 and later Greenlighted for Steam.

== Gameplay ==
Gameplay is similar to Choplifter. Player controls a gyrocopter. His goal is to rescue people in a mine that's filling with deadly gas. He has to manage it in time limit. He also has to avoid the walls and obstacles. If his vehicle is too damaged, it will blow up. The game contains 24 levels.

== Reception ==
The game received mostly positive reviews from critics. It actually holds 75% on Metacritic. The game was also gained nomination in Booom Award in category Best Czech video game in 2011.
