= Inquisitor (video game) =

2009 video game

- Developer: Cinemax
- Writer: Johan Justoň
- Platform: Microsoft Windows
- Release: Czech Republic: November 9, 2009; Worldwide: September 5, 2012
- Genre: Role-playing
- Mode: Single player

Inquisitor is a 2009 role-playing video game developed by Czech company Cinemax. The game was in development for almost 10 years before its release in 2009. Three more years were needed to translate the game into English, and it was released on GOG.com on September 5, 2012. On June 1, 2013, Inquisitor was greenlit on Steam.

== Gameplay ==
Inquisitor plays similarly to the Baldur's Gate series, being a top-down role-playing game. First, the player creates a character, choosing from the classes of priest, paladin, or thief. The player then travels throughout the world, fighting against monsters along the way. The player also investigates crimes against God and the king by finding evidence against the suspect, after which they may be arrested, tortured, and, after conviction, burned at the stake. It is, however, possible to mistakenly arrest innocents should false evidence be found.

Evidence in Inquisitor includes the testimony of other characters in the game, as well as items found at the location where the crime was committed. It is also possible to draw conclusions from seemingly unrelated information. Found evidence is recorded in the character's notebook.

The game has an estimated playing time of 100 hours. Inquisitor includes more than 200 weapons, 80 spells, and seven types of magic, alongside over 90 types of monster to combat.

== Plot ==
The setting of Inquisitor is the fictional kingdom of Utherst, in which the omens of the Prophecy of Saint Ezekiel have started to appear, foretelling the end of the world. The game chronicles the efforts of the titular Inquisition to fight against heresy in light of this. The main character, Maxmilian Conti, is an Inquisitor who is sent to the town of Hillbrandt to investigate the murder of a local merchant.

Maxmilian finds out that the merchant was murdered by Linda von Callagan, a wife of a local noble. At first she denies her guilt but later she confesses out of fear of being murdered by bishop Vallarian, the highest-ranking Inquisitor in the area. It is revealed that Vallarian plotted the problems in Hillbrandt to retrieve an artifact found by the murdered merchant. He used the artifact to summon the demon Arthamon. Vallarian is executed but there are clues indicating that he was a member of an ancient cult trying to bring about an apocalypse.

Maxmilian leaves Hillbrandt and continues his investigation in Glatzburg. There he seeks the help of local priest Trevorius. When he gains his trust, Trevorius is murdered. In the end the protagonist tracks down another member of the cult, Cardinal Truncquillius. Truncquillius is also arrested and executed, but not before he summons a demon, Bafomet, to the world.

Maxmilian then goes to Alvaron, the capital of the kingdom. He gets there just a short time after the death of the king. His investigation leads to a fight against all summoned demons and finding the actual leader of the cult – archbishop Laurentius. When he finds him, the player can choose to join the cult or to stop it.

If Maxmilian joins the cult, Laurentius is killed by a knight who shows up and attacks the player. When the knight is killed, the player has to defeat the Archangel Gabriel. The player then revives the crown prince Louis who creates a new world order.

If the player decides to stop the cult, Maxmilian kills Laurentius but has to fight the fallen angel Azrael. When he defeats Azrael, the crown prince Louis is revived and becomes the new king. In the ending, it is revealed that the pope sent a crusade against the kingdom and Louis has to lead his armies to defend the kingdom. Maxmilian's fate is left unknown.

== Development ==
Inquisitor was in development since 1999 when a company Wooden Dragon was founded. The project was financially supported by Cinemax. The game is inspired by Umberto Eco's works such as The Name of the Rose. The original release date was scheduled for 2001. In 2001 the game was delayed to 2002. The new release date was not scheduled.

In the end the development took 10 years and the game was finally released in November 2009. Developers started to focus on fixing bugs and translation to English. In 2012 the English version was released on GOG and in 2013 on Steam.

== Reception ==
The game received average to positive reviews. It was praised for its story, atmosphere and scope, but was criticized for the quality of its graphics and its high difficulty.

- Best Story/Writing on GameBanshee.
- RPG France INDIE DE L'ANNÉE 2012.

== Possible sequel ==
When Steam started its concepts feature in October 2012, Cinemax made a concept for Inquisitor 2. They asked players what would they expect from next project, giving the choice of a classic role-playing like Inquisitor, an adventure game with role-playing elements, or a different type of a role-playing game than Inquisitor.

The developers also released Inquisitor: Renesance zla (Inquisitor: The Renaissance of Evil), a novel that serves as a sequel to the game. It is set 200 years after Inquisitor and follows Maxmilian Conti, the protagonist of the game, who is summoned from hell.
