= The Keep (video game) =

2014 video game

- Developer(s): Cinemax
- Publisher(s): JP: Arc System Works; WW: Cinemax
- Platform(s): Nintendo 3DS, Microsoft Windows, macOS
- Release: Nintendo 3DS: NA: September 10, 2014; EU: September 18, 2014; JP: January 28, 2015; Microsoft Windows, macOS; March 16, 2017
- Genre(s): Role-playing
- Mode(s): Single-player

The Keep is a role-playing video game developed and published by Cinemax.

== Gameplay ==
The game is a dungeon crawler consisting of 10 levels, each a floor of Watrys's Tower. To complete a level a player must get through multiple puzzles, traps and enemies. The game features realtime combat and players can use magic spells. A spell can be cast with the help of runes that players find across levels. Different mixtures of runes make different spells.

== Plot ==
Having rediscovered the long-lost knowledge of magical arts, the nefarious wizard Watrys is becoming increasingly powerful, but the ruling High Council of the Realm cowardly ignores the threat he poses. Eventually, Watrys burns down the village of Tallia and enslaves all of the children to mine crystals for him. A nameless hero journeys to Watrys’s keep in hopes of defeating him and saving the children, but is soon captured and imprisoned by the wizard’s soldiers. The hero breaks out of the keep’s dungeons and begins fighting his way towards Watrys, encountering ferocious monsters and acquiring powerful equipment. Along the way, it is explained that the crystals are the source of magic, but have addictive properties that corrupt those who attempt to exploit their power, although children are stated to be naturally immune to the crystals’ dark influence. Ultimately, the hero slays Watrys, and it is revealed that he is the son of the miner who originally discovered the magic crystals in Tallia’s mines.

== Reception ==
The game has received generally positive reviews from critics. The average review score is 77%

NintendoDojo gave the game 83%. It praised the gameplay, most notably the combat system. The challenging difficulty and puzzles also got a positive response. On the other hand, it criticised the lack of an automatic save feature and level design as every room looked the same.

RPG Fan marked the game as a miniature clone of Legend of Grimrock but rated it positively at 70%.

== Sequel ==
The developer announced during GDS 2014 that the sequel The Keep 2 was in pre-production development. More details were set to be revealed in 2015.
