= Cinemax (video game developer) =

Czech video game developer and publisher

- Company type: Video game developer
- Industry: Video games
- Founded: 1998
- Headquarters: Prague, Czech Republic
- Key people: Lukáš Macura
- Website: http://cinemax.cz/

Cinemax is an independent Czech video game developer and publisher. The studio was founded by Lukáš Macura. The studio focuses on computer, mobile and console games.

== Developed games ==
- 1997 – Gooka
- 1998 – The Hussite
- 1999 – In the Raven Shadow
- 2001 – State of War
- 2005 – Evil Days of Luckless John
- 2005 – Necromania: Trap of Darkness
- 2005 – Daemonica
- 2006 – Gumboy: Crazy Adventures
- 2007 – Gumboy: Crazy Features
- 2007 – State of War 2: Arcon
- 2008 – Gumboy:Tournament
- 2009 – Puzzle Rocks
- 2009 – Numen: Contest of Heroes
- 2009 – Inquisitor
- 2010 – Sokomania
- 2010 – Snakeoid
- 2012 – Decathlon 2012
- 2012 – Retro Decathlon 2012
- 2012 – Gyro13
- 2013 – 247 Missiles
- 2013 – hexee—smash the match
- 2014 – Wormi
- 2014 – Sokomania 2: Cool Job
- 2014 – The Keep
- 2019 – Jim is Moving Out!
- 2023 – Bzzzt
- TBA – Automatica: Programmable Battle Droids
- TBA – Brahman: The Gate of Salvation
