= Daemonica =

2005 video game

- Developers: RA Images; Cinemax
- Publishers: Cinemax; Meridian4
- Engine: 3DGS
- Platform: Microsoft Windows
- Release: (Czech Republic) May 13, 2005; March 31, 2006
- Genre: Action-adventure game
- Mode: Single player

Daemonica is a 3D action-adventure game with RPG elements that was developed by Czech companies RA Images and Cinemax. The game is divided into 5 acts. Cinemax and RA Images planned a sequel to the game but it was cancelled.

== Plot ==
Daemonica tells the story of Nicholas Farepoynt, a "beast hunter". These are people who investigate serial murderers, "human beasts", and solve their crimes. They do this via the ancient demonic language Daemonica, using it to summon a "soul bearer" demon to temporarily take them to the afterlife so that they can interrogate the spirits of the dead connected to the crime. They need to know certain facts about the deceased to do this, and they can also summon a different demon with the power of resurrection, although no beast hunter is known to have done this and survived. In the prologue, the player learns that Nicholas is the son of Roger Mortimer, 1st Earl of March, and Queen Isabella of France, who were responsible for the death of King Edward II of England. When Mortimer was subsequently executed, Nicholas was sent to a church in France and given the surname Farepoynt instead. He later became a mercenary and joined the English army in the Hundred Years' War. When he returned to England he met the beast hunter Clarice, who taught Nicholas his trade until they worked on a case in York, when she made a mistake which cost her her life. Nicholas then received a letter from the mayor of the small town of Cavorn, where a couple had disappeared, summoning him to investigate.

The game starts as Nicholas nears Cavorn. He discovers that a murder has occurred very recently, but the only suspect was already executed on the orders of the mayor. He proves that the executed person was innocent, earning the trust of the townspeople and the ire of the mayor. He also meets Helen, the beautiful young wife of the mayor, and starts to have feelings for her.

During his investigation another person comes to Cavorn: a man named Fabius, who tries without success to get Nicholas to leave. Nicholas eventually finds out that all the recent murders and disappearances in the area are caused by a demon locked in the crypt of the local monastery and that Fabius is a member of a secret society trying to keep the demon's existence a secret. Nicholas is then poisoned by the mayor, who is revealed to be controlled by the demon. Nicholas survives but finds Helen murdered, and tries to resurrect her, although the ritual seems not to be working. He then goes to the crypt where Fabius reveals that in fact he is trying to release the demon in order to control it and use its abilities for good, attempting to convince Nicholas to help him. The player must now make a decision which will alter the ending of the game.

If they decide to help Fabius, the demon possesses him; he then returns to Rome where he strengthens the Church and new Crusades set out across the world. Life in Cavorn goes on peacefully, oblivious to this threat.

If the player refuses, Nicholas kills Fabius. The demon tries to possess Nicholas but he is saved by Helen, who pulls it into herself. She explains that she is a daughter of someone called Yerik whose bloodline is unbearable to the demon, which helps her keep it under control. Nicholas is not truly convinced he should trust her and so the player is presented with a second choice.

If they decide that Nicholas should trust her, the two live happily together and Nicholas is able to lead a normal life thanks to Helen. It is not certain whether she will be able to hold the demon back forever in order to protect the world or whether it will take control over her one day. If the player chooses the alternative, Nicholas kills Helen and the world is saved, though Nicholas loses any chance of achieving a normal life. He leaves the town and continues his path as a beast hunter. The game informs the player that since then, the townsfolk of Cavorn have been praying for Nicholas' soul and lighting candles for him and Helen.

== Development ==
The game was announced by software studio RA Images in January 2005. It was their first video game project and was scheduled for release in Q1 of 2005.

Daemonica was released in the Czech Republic in May 2005. It was published by Cinemax, which also co-developed the game. In 2006, it was published in North America by Meridian4.

== Reception ==
Reception

Aggregate score
Aggregator	Score
Metacritic	65%

Review scores
Publication	Score
4Players	78%
Adventure Gamers	3/5
GameSpot	4.8/10
GameZone	7.9/10
IGN	7/10

The game has received mostly mixed reviews from critics.

== Sequel ==
In December 2008, Cinemax announced that a direct sequel to the original titled Legends of Daemonica: Farepoynt's Purgatory was in development. Players would control Nicholas Farepoynt, the protagonist of Daemonica, as he arrived on a mysterious island. His goal would be to escape from this island. The game was later cancelled.
