= Numen: Contest of Heroes =

2009 action role-playing video game

- Developer: Cinemax
- Designer: Aleš Ulm
- Engine: CPAL3D
- Platform: Microsoft Windows
- Release: June 3, 2010 (Czech Republic) 14 December 2014
- Genre: Action role-playing game
- Mode: Single player

Numen: Contest of Heroes is a 2009 (released in 2010 worldwide) video game developed by the Czech company Cinemax.

== Gameplay ==
Numen is a Greek mythology-themed action role-playing game. The player's character levels up by killing monsters and completing quests, upon which their abilities improve. Some skills improve automatically based on the abilities performed, but the player may also allocate points. Combat is real-time, but the mechanics are likened more to those of MMORPGs rather than the hack and slash genre.

== Plot ==
The game is about two siblings – a boy Aster and a girl Philia. The player can choose which one he wants to play as. (Note: For the purposes of the plot synopsis, all references to the player character are to Aster from here.) They live at their uncle until Philia is killed by a Scorpion. Aster then takes her body to Parnassus mountain as the tradition calls. There he meets a messenger of gods Iris. She gives him an offer to choose his god and serve him. He can in return have his sister resurrected if the god is pleased. Aster agrees and is taken to a place where is trained until he grows up.

Aster is sent to Machatar a town where he meets a priest of his god. He is tasked to retrieve a Sickle of Cronus. The same task is also given to other 8 heroes who serve to their god. Aster is supposed to retrieve it sooner than any of other heroes. Aster seeks help at a witch Misarica. She reluctantly helps him after he accomplishes some of her quests. It is revealed that Talos participated in stealing the Sickle. His search for Talos leads him to a thief who used Talos to steal the Sickle and then destroyed him. The thief reveals that he was hired by some mysterious person. Aster then seeks help at Misarica once again. She leads him to a three-headed dog Othrus. Aster then finds the dog and kills it. After that he meets a Titan Geryon who has the Sickle. Aster defeats Geryon and retrieves the Sickle. His god is pleased and Philia is resurrected.

== Development ==
Numen was developed using the CPAL3D engine. The game was announced in 2007. It was finished on 25 November 2009 with release date scheduled for 14 December. Developers also mentioned a possibility of an expansion pack which was later denied due to low sales and not wanting to work with CPAL3D again.

Developers later revealed that game sold in the Czech Republic 500 copies while 17 000 counterfeit copies had been evidenced. Developers decided to use digital rights management with a new pack. It caused player not to be allowed to progress at one point in the game and been reprimanded for being a pirate. Developers then started to investigate a high rate of copyright infringement. They eventually revealed that the game was leaked by a person with nickname THX-1138. The person was revealed to be Martin Holas, a video game journalist who wrote a Numen review for Czech version of Eurogamer where he gave it 40%. Eurogamer distanced itself from his private activities and fired him, but also held his review to be accurate.

== Reception ==
The game has received mixed reviews from critics. Gaming Nexus gave the game 79%, praising gameplay and the story even though it had a slow boring start. The reviewer also noted that he liked the possibility of working against other heroes; he also wrote that he enjoyed the visuals of the gaming world. On the other hand, he criticised an abrupt ending and shortness.
