= Shadows: Heretic Kingdoms =

2014 video game

- Developer: Games Farm
- Publisher: bitComposer Games
- Designer: International Hobo
- Series: Heretic Kingdoms
- Engine: OGRE
- Platform: Microsoft Windows
- Release: November 20, 2014
- Genre: Action role-playing

Shadows: Heretic Kingdoms is an action role-playing game released on Windows in November 2014. An isometric game, it is developed by the Slovakian studio Games Farm, formerly known as 3D People, and published by bitComposer Games. The predecessor of Shadows is Kult: Heretic Kingdoms, published in 2004, the successor is Shadows: Awakening which serves as both a remake and sequel to Shadows: Heretic Kingdoms.

== Gameplay ==
The core element of Shadows: Heretic Kingdoms is its internally conflicted main character and the associated unique party system. Seamlessly switching between the Devourer and up to three party members, each with their own special abilities, provides strategic depth in battle, while switching between worlds also allows players to outwit their opponents in battle, avoiding traps and solving puzzles along the way.

== Reception ==
Based on 15 Critic Reviews the game has 74 on Metacritic.
