= Games Distillery =

Slovak video game developer (2008–2013)

- Company type: Video game developer
- Industry: Video games
- Founded: 2008
- Defunct: 2013
- Headquarters: Bratislava, Slovakia
- Key people: Juergen Reusswig; Slavo Hazucha
- Number of employees: 20 (2010)
- Website: www.gamesdistillery.com

Games Distillery was a Slovak video game developer based in Bratislava. It was founded by members of defunct company 10tacle Studios Slovakia that worked on a cancelled game Elveon.

== History ==
The studio was founded in August 2008. Its first project was Aqua. The game was announced during Leipzig Games Convention 2008. The game was released in May 2010.

The studio then worked on two unannounced projects that were to be introduced around Electronic Entertainment Expo 2010.

In November 2012 the studio announced its new project, Citadels. The game was released in July 2013 to very negative reviews. Games Distillery then worked on patches for the game until September when BigMoon Studios took over the works.

== Games ==
All games by Games Distillery
Title	Year	Platform(s)	Genre	Description
Aqua	2010	Windows, Xbox 360	Action	A twin-stick arcade shooter with a steampunk theme.
Citadels	2013	Windows	Strategy	A realtime strategy game with an Arthurian legend theme.
