= Revolt of Don's Knights =

1996 video game

- Developer: Emerald Software
- Platform: MS-DOS
- Release: 1996
- Genre: Role-playing

Revolt of Don's Knights (Slovak: Vzbura Dónskych Rytierov) is a 1996 role-playing video game for MS-DOS by Emerald Software.

== Reception ==
Dungeon Crawlers felt it wasn't a particularly good example of the genre.

== Legacy ==
A contest based around the game was held fifteen years after its release in 2013.
