= Vikings: Wolves of Midgard =

2017 video game

- Developer: Games Farm
- Publisher: Kalypso Media
- Director: Péter Nagy
- Designers: Ján Turán; Peter Hornak; Péter Nagy; Chris Bateman; Neil Bundy; Brian Towlson
- Programmer: Ján Turán
- Writers: Chris Bateman; Neil Bundy; Brian Towlson
- Composer: Dynamedion
- Engine: Unity 5
- Platforms: Windows, PlayStation 4, Xbox One, Linux, macOS
- Release: Windows: WW: 24 March 2017; PlayStation 4, Xbox One: PAL: 24 March 2017; NA: 28 March 2017; Linux, macOS: WW: 18 August 2017
- Genre: Action role-playing
- Modes: Single-player, multiplayer

Vikings: Wolves of Midgard is an action role-playing game developed by Slovak studio Games Farm and published by Kalypso Media. It is set in a fantasy world inspired by the Norse mythology.

== Gameplay ==
The gameplay is similar to that of Diablo in which the players create their own character, the players can choose their character appearance, gender and attributes. The game has several quests besides the main storyline and the game has an open world environment, they can explore snowy valleys, Viking cities, ice caverns, ancient tombs and several other places.

The gameplay progresses between linear, self-contained levels navigated through a hub area, namely the village of the Ulfung tribe from which the player character hails. The player can choose to run 'hunt' missions on already completed maps where objectives are set to kill a certain number of a nominated enemy, or they can choose 'raid' missions in which the story is progressed. Story missions include basic puzzles, collectibles and usually finish with a boss encounter. Instead of gaining experience, player collects blood which can be offered to gods in their altars. Wood and iron are the two resources needed to progress through the game, because they are used to upgrade the village itself, giving you new tiers of skills and equipments.

The game features both single-player and multiplayer for up to two players. Multiplayer support is via online local via local area network (LAN). Local co-op using the same screen or split-screen (also referred to as couch-co-op) is not supported, however this is a heavily requested feature, particularly for the console versions of the game. Developers have stated there are no plans for local couch-co-op at this time. As of June 2017, two-player local co-op has been added to the PlayStation 4 version of the game.

Update Jan 18th 2023 There is now couch co-op on ps4

== Synopsis ==
=== Setting and characters ===
Vikings: Wolves of Midgard is set in the Shores of Midgard, a world based upon the mythology and history of the Vikings with a fantasy twist. The game follows a warrior/shieldmaiden who recently become the newest chieftain of Ulfung Village, the home of the namesake tribe said to be consisted of outcasts and renegades, after saving their home from a Jötnar raid orchestrated by a powerful Jötunn called Grimnir. Around that time, Æsir and Vanir, two tribes that make up Gods of Asgard, once again locked in another war leaving the rest of the realm open to threats from their common enemies. Fortunately, this doesn't prevent five of the major Gods (Odin, Thor, Tyr, Skathi, and Loki) from bestowing gifts upon inhabitants of Ulfung Village in return of blood offering thus providing them, the protagonist in particular, an edge against their enemies as they rebuild their village and discover the truth behind the invasion.

=== Plot ===
The protagonist, known as War-wolf by Vala the Seeress, returns to Ulfung Village in time to see it invaded by Grimnir's attack forces. Meeting Volund the Blacksmith who just escaped their enemies' wrath, he gives them their first Healing Totem, Eir's Charity, before pressing on. In the ensuing battle, they save two of their fellow villagers, Hildibrand the Armorer and Helga the Skald, who overwhelmed by Jötnar army and even defeat the enemies' Jötunn commander forcing the rest of the invaders into retreating along the way. With their chieftain perished during the onslaught and War-wolf has proved themselves before their surviving kinsmen, they become the former's immediate successor.

While doing their part in rebuilding their village, War-wolf is joined by Skallagrim (the shipwright they saved from icy clutches of frost spirit Jokul who seized control over the fjords near their home thus must be vanquished so their people can safely hunt and gather materials there) and Frakki (the runesmith and Helga's father they saved from troll siege on Fangskar perpetrated by Grindan and Grindill, Helga's half-brother and troll mother respectively). War-wolf also subdued their kin's rivals Svanung Tribe and Jarnung Tribe by killing their respective warchief to ensure they won't become future threats, and may choose whether to have both Tribes swearing fealty to Ulfung Tribe or plunder them of their resource instead.

Upon being informed by Hildibrand about the sighting of Grimnir's army setting up a camp in the Cold Spring Valley, War-wolf wastes no time to lead an attack there. Though Grimnir eludes War-wolf's vengeance in the ensuing raid due to a certain agenda in mind, Ulfung chieftain nonetheless lands a major blow to his forces by vanquishing his lieutenant Skalli, proving their enemies that they and their people shouldn't be underestimated.

Returning home, War-wolf meets Vala the Seeress who warns them of their nemesis' plan; the Jötunn warchief sought to secure Frost Jötnar's alliance in invading Asgard thus bring forth Ragnarök upon all Nine Realms. Vala further explains that War-wolf must do the same with Grimnir's rival Simul thus requires twain runes (Kenaz and Hagalaz) to create a portal to reach her domain in Útgarðar before abruptly departs from Ulfung Village, leaving Helga and Frakki who fill them the rest of information they seek. War-wolf subsequently revisits Svanung and Jarnung villages for their respective twain rune and saves them both from paladin crusade of Imperium Romani led by Bishop of Earth who revealed to both coveted said runes and pledged themselves upon the Vanir - the troubling sign of the feud between Æsir and Vanir spilled over the shores of Midgard as before. True to War-wolf's concerns regarding their potential ally's treacherous nature, Simul orders Ulfung chieftain's execution rather than listening to their proposal before departing alongside her forces, going so far magically demolishes her current base to ensure their death. Thanks to Vala's timed arrival, War-wolf manages to escape certain doom and even seize Draupnir ring Simul stole from Odin himself along the way. War-wolf has the choice to give the multiplying ring to Vala so she can return it to the All-Father thus won them Odin's favor or keep it for themselves. Regardless, Vala couldn't shake Simul's future role in ensuring Ulfung Tribe's victory over their enemies in future battles ahead one way or another.

Skallagrim reveals to War-wolf how Imperium Romana managed to reach their territory in the first place; the invaders received unwilling assistance from Flotnar Tribe, a Viking clan who knows how to cross the treacherous waters of Gandvik, the Bay of Serpents. Heading towards Hahofn, the high harbor which serves as Flotnar Tribe's home, War-wolf soundly liberates it from the invaders' control and frees imprisoned members of the Tribe along the way. Grateful for their rescue, liberated clansmen of Flotnar Tribe teach their liberators how to use sailspar, stretching pole devised to help sailors safely navigating through great leeward reefs of Gandvik. Fardain, the traveling merchant from distant land who happened to be among freed captives, decides to establish his new shop at Ulfung Village, much to Volund's pleasant surprise. The merchant's business there goes very well by the time War-wolf returned from winning the rematch against Grindill and subsequently rewarded with craftsmanship techniques with Jotunjarn (special metal utilized by Jötnar). It is from Fardain they learn more about the invaders; majorities of members of Imperium Romana, their Bishops who in charge of scores of civilized cities on the southern continent included, are Vanirites – devotees of Vanir – who blame clans of Thule for the coming of the Great Ice. As such, War-wolf must try and sack Castra Ignis on the other side of the Bay of Serpents to force concessions from the Vanirites.

When the initial one-man siege against Castra Ignis fails due to its rear gate being as heavily fortified as the rest but not before discovering the whole place stands above one of possibly several pathways leading to Útgarðar and leaving enormous damage behind, War-wolf reluctantly accepts Grindill's unexpected assistance in exchange of retrieving cursed ring Andvaranaut from the burial mound of the fallen hero Sigurd she slew long ago at Forgotten Isles. Traveling there, War-wolf defeats Sigurd and claims Andvaranaut which they subsequently passes to Grindill who then fulfills her part of the bargain. Guided by the troll witch, War-wolf finally bypasses Castra Ignis' defenses and continues their one-man assault, meeting the Imperium commander Bellatrix (whom they can either challenge or reason to no avail), and cuts down Bishop of the Sea. Though this crippling blow ensures Imperium Romana to be the least of Ulfung Tribe's worries for a time being, Vala believes that Simul's unwilling hand will truly ensure the end of the conflict between it and War-wolf's kin hence why she urges War-wolf to try to negotiate with the ruthless giantess once more, this time at her current base in Dvergheim, Svartálfheim, where she recently secures the alliance with the Dvergar. Disgusted by their persistence to negotiate with her, Simul predictably made another attempt to end the arrived Ulfung chieftain, this time by summoning Garmr to destroy them as she makes her leave. As Vala noted, the giantess failed to take the account of both Ulfung chieftain emerging victorious against the Hel-hound and growing likelihood of her beneficial role in turning the tide of Ulfung Tribe's conflict against Imperium Romana in their favor thanks to her hubris.

== Reception ==
The game has won Slovak Game of the Year Awards in categories for the Best Game and the Best Visual Design.
