= Necromania: Trap of Darkness =

2002 video game

- Developer(s): Darksoft Game Development Studio; Cinemax
- Publisher(s): Strategy First
- Platform(s): Microsoft Windows
- Release: RUS: October 23, 2002; CZ: March 21, 2003; NA: May 5, 2005
- Genre(s): Role-playing video game
- Mode(s): Single-player, multiplayer

Necromania: Trap of Darkness is a Role-playing video game developed by the Slovakian developer Darksoft Game Development Studio and the Czech company Cinemax. It was released in 2002 in Russia and later worldwide. The player can choose one of Ragnar's minions that he wants to play as.

== Plot ==
Dark lord Ragnar and the ruler of Necromania was defeated and imprisoned by the army of the Absurdian king Bill Cocoton. Seven of his servants wake up and go to find magic keys that can set him free. But only one of them can lead the army of darkness.

== Reception ==
The game was received poorly by critics. It was mostly criticised for its gameplay and notable difficulty. Some reviews praised its multiplayer mode but found it difficult to find anyone to play with.

Neither players received the game well. The average rating of the game by players is 40%.
