= State of War (video game) =

2001 video game

- Developers: Cypron Studios; Cinemax
- Publisher: Crystal Interactive
- Platform: Windows
- Release: 2001
- Genre: Real-time strategy
- Modes: Single-player, multiplayer

State of War is a real-time strategy game, created by the Slovak developer Cypron Studios (now Cypronia) and Cinemax and published by Crystal Interactive in 2001.

The classic versions of State of War and State of War: Warmonger were bundled together and ported to modern systems, releasing on Steam in December 2018.

== Story ==
This description is told by narrator at the beginning of the game.

After centuries of continuous struggles, war and turmoil; humankind finally came together and founded the United Federation of Seven Continents (UFSC). It was decided that every member of the Federation would provide their armed forces to build a single military unit with the goal to protect the Earth and settle eventual conflicts. Thus it was no longer possible for any individual group to use military force to resolve their personal aim.

Within several years, the Federation created a Global Defense Network, known as "Overmind". The Overmind was a super intelligent mainframe computer, described as a unique work of hundreds of the most gifted scientists on the planet. It was operated by an intelligent software and consisted of 22 military bases worldwide located far from populated areas ready to act in case of the conflict. Since then, no machinery was ever controlled by man. Only the formal approval to activate "Overmind" had to be given by each UFSC representative.

Global society, however, carried its burdens. People suffering from spiritual emptiness sought refuge in organizations that offered salvation. The most influential among them was the Beho-Sunns. Charismatic leaders of the cult used their personal charm and rhetorical skills to attract more and more people. Their audience included every social group from workers, scienties, lawyers to elite politicians. Behind it all, there was the wicked plan to get hold of "Overmind". None of the Beho-Sunns followers knew that during their meditation seasons the cult gathered all kinds of information from their minds. Over years, the Beho-Sunns discovered much about Overmind's mechanics and were able to hack the software which controls Overmind.

It so happened that the Beho-Sunns leaders tried to hack Overmind, but due to sophisticated firewall protection, they failed. Consequences were fatal. The Global Defense System went out of order and malfunctioned. Members of the Beho-Sunns quickly recovered from their defeat and started occupying defenseless military bases. Their actions must be halted! To do so, the UFSC have declared a state of war.

== Development ==
Development of State of War began prior to its 2001 release, when Stefan Pavelka and Emil Popovic founded Cypron Studios. The core development team consisted of Pavelka and Popovič, with Martin Demsky contributing the game’s music soundtrack. Pavelka led the design of the game mechanics and was responsible for the 2D and 3D graphics and animation, while Popovič developed the single-player and multiplayer systems, including LAN networking functionality.

The project drew on Stefan Pavelka’s prior experience with Napalm: The Crimson Crisis, a real-time strategy title for the Amiga developed by Ablaze Entertainment. The game was published in 2001.

== Sequels and Legacy ==
=== State of War: Warmonger ===
A standalone mission pack titled State of War: Warmonger was released in 2003, containing 22 extra missions, using same game engine and no new units. Both State of War and State of War: Warmonger are available in bundle on Steam.

=== State of War 2: Arcon ===
A follow-up titled State of War 2: Arcon was released in 2007 for Microsoft Windows as a sequel to the original game. Developed by Cypron Studios and Cinemax.

It features different game mechanics compared to State of War. While the original game focused on capturing existing bases and buildings rather than constructing them, Arcon introduces full base building along with the continued use of credit terminals for resource management. The game emphasizes tactical combat with faster-paced encounters and streamlined economic systems, set in a futuristic virtual warfare environment.

Despite these innovations, Arcon was less successful commercially and critically than the original title.

=== Command and Destroy ===
In 2008 a Nintendo DS game titled Command and Destroy was released by Cypronia featuring similar visual and real-time strategy design. It was met with mixed reception from critics, mostly due to limited options for game control and lack of mouse in Nintendo DS game console and GameZone's review stated that is a "half-decent effort that doesn't live up to the legacy created by the game it mimics", referencing the similarly titled Command & Conquer.

=== Clones and Inspired Games ===
After State of War, several unofficial clones appeared in Chinese gaming communities under the name 蓝色警戒 (“Blue Alert”). These games imitated the original RTS mechanics, sometimes adding base building or credit terminals, but were not developed or published by the original creators Cypron Studios, circulated mainly through community sites and download portals, and none achieved commercial success.

== Controversy ==
=== Example of early 2000s software piracy in Eastern Europe ===
State of War has been cited as an example of how PC games were commonly pirated and distributed in Eastern Europe and Russia during early 2000s. At the time, enforcement of intellectual property rights in the regional software market was inconsistent, and unauthorized retail editions of various Western and Central European games frequently appeared in local stores.

In Russia, the game circulated in unofficial editions attributed to local distributors such as Fargus. These releases were not licensed by the game’s developer, Cypronia, nor by its official Russian distributor, 1C Company. The unofficial editions often closely replicated the artwork and packaging of the legitimate versions and causing copyright infringement. Such releases reflected broader industry practices of the period rather than a controversy specific to the game itself.

The widespread availability of unlicensed copies in the region illustrates the distribution environment of the era, when physical PC game online piracy was common and affordable localized editions were in high demand.

=== Title controversy in China ===
Although the game’s official English title was State of War, it was allowed to be distributed in China under the translated name Blue Alert According to Chinese media sources, the title was interpreted as a deliberate contrast to Command & Conquer: Red Alert, the popular real-time strategy game.
