= Ramonovo Kouzlo =

1995 Slovakian video game

Ramon's Spell
- Developer: Michal Janáček
- Publisher: Vochozka Trading
- Platform: MS-DOS
- Release: 1995
- Genre: Adventure

Ramonovo kouzlo (English: Ramon's Spell) is a Czech graphic adventure game made by a group of developers around Michal Janáček. It was published by Vochozka Trading in 1995 for MS-DOS. It used scanned photographs as background graphics. A Polish-language edition was released by Mirage Software in 1995.

== Gameplay ==
The game is a point and click adventure consisting of a series of static photographs and no animation. The game is set in Nové Město nad Metují, where the evil wizard Ramon settled and enslaved good elves. It is the player's task to free the city from Ramon and save the elves from the curse.

== Development ==
The game was developed by a team headed by the Czech developer Michal Janáček. Janáček later joined the company Pterodon, working on the Vietcong series.

== Reception ==
The game received a negative review in Riki magazine and a fairly positive review in the Excalibur magazine.
