= Shadows: Awakening =

2018 video game

- Developer: Games Farm
- Publisher: Kalypso Media
- Director: Peter Nagy
- Writer: Peter Hornák
- Composer: Benny Oschmann
- Series: Heretic Kingdoms
- Engine: Unity
- Platforms: Microsoft Windows, Xbox One, PlayStation 4
- Release: 17 August 2018
- Genre: Action role-playing

Shadows: Awakening is an action role-playing game developed by Slovak studio Games Farm and published by Kalypso Media for Microsoft Windows, Xbox One and PlayStation 4 in August 2018. It is both a remake and sequel to the 2014 game Shadows: Heretic Kingdoms and is the third installment of the Heretic Kingdoms series.

== Gameplay ==
Shadows: Awakening is played from an isometric perspective with a top-down camera angle. The game focuses on hack-and-slash combat and loot collection, encouraging the player to utilise its core mechanic of switching between the Devourer, a demon summoned from the Shadow Realm, and up to three playable characters.

The game also contains puzzles and quests that players must complete in order to progress the story.

== Plot ==
Like its predecessor, Shadows: Awakening takes place in the fantasy world of the Heretic Kingdoms. The game begins with the player being summoned from the Shadow Realm in the form of a demon named the Devourer by a mysterious hooded man, voiced by Tom Baker. The player is then given three characters to choose from; long-deceased heroes each with their own abilities and storyline, which the Devourer possesses. The hero, now brought back to life, is called upon to stop other demonic forces from taking over the Heretic Kingdoms in the form of the recently assassinated secret council Penta Nera.

== Reception ==
The game received "generally favorable reviews" according to the review aggregation website Metacritic, with a critic score of 77/100. Push Square also gave the game a rating of 7/10, stating "Shadows: Awakening is a deep action RPG which brings a literal new dimension to the tried and tested Diablo format. It's a great choice for those looking for a meaty fantasy time-sink, and while it does stumble occasionally, it delivers many hours of engaging hack-'n'-slash gaming."

The game was ranked 94th in Metacritic's Best PC Video Games for 2018 list. It was nominated in the Technology category in the 2019 Central and Eastern European Game Awards (CEEGA), but lost to Space Engineers.

== Expansions ==
The game's first expansion, The Chromaton Chronicles, was released on 26 October 2018 on Microsoft Windows, Xbox One, and PlayStation 4. This expansion added new areas for the player to explore, as well as a new puppet for the player to summon.

The second expansion, entitled Necrophage's Curse, was released on 13 December 2018 for the same platforms, and added new puzzles, quests, enemies and another new puppet.
