= Citadels (video game) =

2013 real-time strategy video game

- Developer(s): Games Distillery
- Publisher(s): bitComposer Games
- Platform(s): Microsoft Windows
- Release: Windows: WW: July 25, 2013
- Genre(s): Real-time strategy
- Mode(s): Single-player

Citadels is a real-time strategy video game developed by Games Distillery and published by bitComposer Games. Based on a loose interpretation of the King Arthur tale, players are tasked with restoring the honor, glory and reign of the Arthurian line. With two separate campaigns, players are given the choice of seeing the Good or Evil side of the war, as they carve a path into an uncertain future for the King and his loyal men. Upon the successful completion of in-game side-quests, players will be rewarded with legendary heroes for use in the main campaign.

It was released on July 25, 2013, for Windows via Steam. The game was met with negative reception.

== Plot ==
The game is set during the fall of King Arthur's reign. His Kingdom loses to an invading force backed by Mordred and Morgan.

== Gameplay ==
In Citadels, players command a set of troops and move them by dragging over them and setting their destination by a group of dots. The game also includes a building feature, where players can build houses, farms, and other buildings to improve the player's kingdom in the game.

== Reception ==
Citadels was met with negative reception. It has a Metacritic score of 20.

Common complaints, associated with Citadels, include "pathing" issues, basic real-time strategy features missing or underdeveloped, basic commands are very unresponsive, tedious gameplay elements and poor tutorial and in-game instructions.
