= Aqua (video game) =

2010 twin-stick shooter video game

- Developer: Games Distillery
- Publishers: Microsoft Game Studios (X360); Immanitas Entertainment (PC)
- Platforms: Xbox 360; Microsoft Windows
- Release: Xbox 360; May 19, 2010; Windows; May 25, 2011
- Genre: Twin-stick shooter
- Modes: Single-player, multiplayer

Aqua (also known as Naval Warfare for the PC version) is a 2010 twin-stick shooter video game developed by Games Distillery and published by Microsoft Game Studios for the Xbox 360 via Xbox Live Arcade. The game is set in an alternate reality where most of the Earth is covered with water and factions war for the remaining pieces of land.

The game received mixed reception from reviewers who gave high praise to the game's hand-drawn cutscenes and steampunk setting. Gameplay was received to mixed commentary among reviewers, who praised the game's length and some also praised Aqua for attempting to do more than typical twin-stick shooters, but others expressed disappointment in the number of escort missions and lack of online multiplayer.

== Synopsis ==
Aqua is set in an alternate reality in which almost the entire surface of the planet is covered with water.

After a global cataclysmal event, the world is flooded, continents have disappeared, and little landscape remains above water level. The few remaining survivors quickly form nations and forge empires to control the vast oceanic territories and the little remaining land. Captain Benjamin Grey of the Emperean Empire, the game's protagonist, is considered by many a war hero in the recent war against the Samureans.

The game begins as Grey and engineer Polly Edison discover the Gothean air force is heading for the Emperean headquarters. Grey fights his way through a Samurean base now swarmed with corsairs ravaging its contents. He finally arrives at headquarters only to find it under heavy siege by some serious Gothean strike force. Grey and company escape with some survivors from the base.

After desperate attempts to strike at the heart of the Gotheans, Grey and Edison discover a secret power, personified by a character named Cerbera. The two characters must cross borders with their own side, facing diffidence and disdain of the Emperean Empire itself. They manage to reveal the truth about the conspiracy against the entire world and finally crush Cerbera's greatest agent. In the closing sequence an escape module is shown fleeing from smoldering ruins of the battle, indicating an open end in the story.

== Gameplay ==
In Aqua, the player commands an elite vessel to navigate a world filled with vast seas and scattered isles. The game world is seen from a bird's eye perspective with the camera tightly following the player's ship. The player navigates the ship with the left analog stick and fires their primary weapons with the right stick. Several types of weaponry can be assigned as the primary weapons, including machine guns. Also at the player's disposal are mines and several types of torpedoes. In addition to various guns, the player can also equip their ships with diverse upgrades. These items enhance different attributes of the player's ship such as weapon damage, ship endurance, speed, and maneuverability. In combination with various guns and upgrades, the player can configure multiple setups to create their own unique play style. The player's vessel is equipped with a special weapon which can be used once the player collects enough Aquaflux; energy collected from destroyed enemies. The player can also employ AI controlled squads of elite watercraft, giving them various context orders to influence the outcome of battles.

The game features several play modes. The campaign consists of nine missions, and is driven via in game cinematics and hand drawn motion comic sequences between missions. Later in the campaign, the player can usually choose from three types of ships to control; Speedboats, Cruisers, and Gunships. Each vessel features unique attributes and abilities. The second single player mode, Skirmish, has the player withstand an infinite number of enemy waves with increasing difficulty, and to reach the highest score possible. Local multiplayer is also supported, with two game modes. Arena is similar to Skirmish except two players work cooperatively to defeat endless enemy waves. Chase as a variation on a simple race game mode. Players attempt to obtain a higher score than their opponent by reaching checkpoints which randomly appear in the level and by destroying neutral vessels.

== Development ==
Aqua was developed by Games Distillery. It began as a simple project with basic gameplay in mind; a shooter game set on water. The developers further felt that Aqua should be more or less a free world to navigate, with specific goals defined by a story. The team began with a basic prototype, which served as a basis for gameplay. The team then brainstormed and created various features and prototype missions from which the actual levels were built. The team were required to change several gameplay elements following the game's first testing session. Many features and mission bits were changed, cut or completely redesigned. The game was publicly announced on April 9, 2010 with Microsoft Game Studios signed to publish the game in the summer of 2010. Multiple trailers were subsequently released. Aqua was released on May 19, 2010 for the Xbox 360 via Xbox Live Arcade.

== Reception ==
Reception

Aggregate score
| Aggregator | Score | |
| Aggregator | PC | Xbox 360 |
|---|---|---|
| Metacritic | 57/100 | 61/100 |

Review scores
| Publication | Score | |
| Publication | PC | Xbox 360 |
|---|---|---|
| 1Up.com | N/A | B |
| Edge | N/A | 3/10 |
| Eurogamer | N/A | 7/10 |
| GamePro | 3/5 | N/A |
| GameSpot | N/A | 5.5/10 |
| GameZone | 4.5/10 | N/A |
| IGN | N/A | 5.5/10 |
| Jeuxvideo.com | 14/20 | 15/20 |
| Official Xbox Magazine (US) | N/A | 7/10 |

The game received "mixed" reviews on both platforms according to the review aggregation website Metacritic.

Most critics gave high marks in regards to the Xbox 360 version's setting and visual style. Brett Todd of GameSpot felt the same console version had a "unique and atmospheric steampunk-at-sea setting." Eurogamer's Kristan Reed praised the "beautiful hand-drawn cut scenes." Eric Neigher, reviewer for 1Up.com, also felt the hand-drawn cutscenes were of high quality. Multiple reviewers compared the setting to the film Waterworld. Ryan Clements of IGN felt that not enough time was spent to explain the setting of the Xbox 360 version and its characters.

The Xbox 360 version received mixed commentary in regards to gameplay. The reviewer for Official Xbox Magazine noted that its "combat and controls are quite good, and yet it feels a bit sleepy." Clements felt that the game's escort missions were frustrating and hurt the pace of the game. Todd agreed and also expressed disappointment with the lack of online multiplayer. Neigher appreciated the same console version's basic gameplay. He called it a "simple game with a lot of simple fun to be had." Reed gave high remarks in regards to the same Xbox 360 version's customization and upgrade system which when combined with its story gives it "a personality of its own." GameZone's David Sanchez said of the PC version, "Naval Warfare shouldn't take you too long to play through. But because the game gets boring so fast, you’re not going to want to finish the entire adventure. The game has some redeeming qualities in its Skirmish and multiplayer modes, but these are short-lived."

As of January 2011 the Xbox 360 version sold over 8,300 units. Year-end 2011 sales analyses showed that it had moved to over 31,000 units.
