= Quadrax =

Series of freeware video games, from 1995

- Screenshot from Quadrax, version ZX_Spectrum(1994)
- Developer: Cauldron
- First release: Quadrax; 1995

Quadrax is a Slovak video game series of freeware games by Cauldron, commencing with Quadrax in 1995.

The goal of the game is to guide two avatars through a series of platform levels located in an ancient temple. Both avatars must collaborate pushing rocks and activating levers that controls doors and elevators to clear the way until reunite in a target platform per level. There is not limit of time, but players can die if falls in a trap or from a high height or are crushed by a rock. The control of the avatars may be taken by one human player in alternate turns, or taken by two human players simultaneously.

Last games in the series added minor changes as increment the number of avatars to three, add treasures that the players must collect before leaving the level or hidden traps that will shoot the players.

== Production ==
The original concept was on the 1994 game created by David Durčák (programming) and Marian Ferko (graphics) for ZX Spectrum, which contained 50 levels and was distributed by Ultrasoft.

This duo of creators founded Cauldron Ltd. the following year and published the version for MS-Dos in 1996, adding a backstory written by Maros Stano and expanding the game to 100 levels. The 1996 version added new devices to the game as teleports or magnetic blocks. The 1996 game was one of the first commercially sold logic games distributed in Slovakia. Despite the success of the 1996 game, there wasn't any official sequel published by Cauldron and the original authors. The original game is today freeware and can be downloaded from the Cauldron web.

In 1997 Josef Kreutzer made by himself an unofficial PC sequel called 'Return to Quadrax' which remained unpublished. In 1999 he decided to make another sequel named 'Quadrax III' which was published by Alfaline in 2000, becoming the first public successor. The fourth game, 'Quadrax IV' was released in 2008.

== Reception ==
Bonusweb.cz felt that Quadrax belonged in the tradition of puzzle games alongside The Humans and Lemmings. The site described 2006's Faux pa as a clone of this title. Doupe.cz thought the game was excellent.

Bonusweb.cz said Quadrax IV is a cool project and that it does not disappoint.

Bonusweb.cz said that Quadrax VIII is the most difficult game of all time.

Bonusweb.cz felt that Quadrax X raised the bar of difficulty from the previous entries.
