= The House of Da Vinci =

2017 puzzle adventure game

- Developer: Blue Brain Games
- Publisher: Blue Brain Games
- Platforms: Android, iOS, Windows, macOS
- Release: WW: June 22, 2017
- Genres: Puzzle, adventure
- Mode: Single-player

The House of Da Vinci is a 2017 puzzle adventure video game developed by Slovak indie studio Blue Brain Games. It is based on fictional events set during the Renaissance.

Blue Brain Games released three sequels: The House of Da Vinci 2 in 2019, The House of Da Vinci 3 in 2022, and The House of Da Vinci VR in 2024.

== Premise ==
The story is set up in Florence, Italy during the Renaissance. The player is Leonardo da Vinci's apprentice, searching for the missing master. The player starts the search in Da Vinci's house and has to solve a series of puzzles in different rooms in order to find clues for Da Vinci's whereabouts.

== Gameplay ==
Apart from complex puzzles that are physics based, the player gains access to two lenses with supernatural abilities. With one, they can see hidden codes and with the other they can see what had happened in the past. The player occasionally gets to see letters from their master Da Vinci and also from the antagonists.

== Development ==
Blue Brain Games is an indie team of graphic artists and developers, all of whom are people interested in both 3D puzzle games and the renaissance genius Leonardo da Vinci. The House of Da Vinci was successfully funded on Kickstarter in late 2016. 2,391 adventure game enthusiasts backed the game.

== Reception ==
Merlina McGovern of Adventure Gamers rated the game 3.5 out of 5 and wrote that "although The House of Da Vinci is slightly marred by persnickety mechanics and the occasionally frustrating puzzle, exploring the mind of a genius by reverse engineering his inventions will pull you into a gorgeous Renaissance world and keep you challenged throughout."

AppUnwrapper wrote in their review, "If you're a fan of The Room series by Fireproof Games and can't wait for the fourth one to release, Blue Brain Games' The House of Da Vinci is the closest thing you can get to the real thing."

Reviewing the iOS version, Emily Sowden of Pocket Gamer said "The House of Da Vinci has two major areas to focus on. One: the unavoidable fact that it's essentially The Room in a different package. Two: the unavoidable fact that it's actually a decent game."

Maria Alexander of Droidgamer rated the game 9/10. The game was rated 9 for aesthetics, 9.2 for gameplay, 8.7 for innovation and 9.1 for value. "The House of Da Vinci is a massive, gorgeous, cleverly designed puzzler that gives The Room, its main inspiration, a pretty good run for its money.", she said.

Borja Ruete of MeriStation rated the game 7/10.

== Sequels ==
On December 4, 2019, Blue Brain Games released a sequel, The House of Da Vinci 2, for iOS. A Google Play Store version was released on February 18, 2020, with a Steam version on May 29, 2020.

On August 25, 2021, Blue Brain Games announced The House of Da Vinci 3, the upcoming conclusion to the trilogy. It was released in August 2022.

On December 4, 2024, Blue Brain Games released The House of Da Vinci VR, a virtual reality game.
