= Napalm: The Crimson Crisis =

- Developers: Ablaze Entertainment
- Publisher: clickBOOM
- Platform: Amiga
- Release: 1998
- Genre: Real-time strategy

Napalm: The Crimson Crisis is a real-time strategy (RTS) game for AGA class Amiga computers developed by Ablaze Entertainment (now Cypronia) and published by clickBOOM in 1998. Reception of the game was generally positive. The game has been cited as one of the most advanced RTS titles for the Amiga platform, and was frequently compared to the Command & Conquer series.

== Gameplay ==
Napalm is set in a science-fiction future where the United Earth Defence Force is at war with a rebellion of intelligent robots. Players can choose to control either faction, each featuring a distinct campaign of missions.

The game follows standard RTS mechanics:

- Resource Management: Players must mine oil to fund their army and infrastructure.
- Base Building: Construction of light and heavy factories, radar outposts, and defensive towers is required to unlock advanced units.
- Combat: The game features a variety of units including infantry (such as the "Bazooker"), tanks (like the four-barreled "Bastard" tank), and aircraft (the "Cheyenne" gunship).

The game was notable for its high-resolution 2D graphics and support for PowerPC processors and graphics cards (RTG), allowing it to run at higher resolutions than most Amiga games of the era.

== Development ==
Napalm was developed by the Slovak studio Ablaze Entertainment (later known as Cypron Studios / Cypronia) and published by clickBOOM, a company known for bringing high-end PC-style games to the Amiga (such as Quake and Myst). It was coded primarily in 68k Assembly Language to ensure performance on high-end Amiga hardware.

The game was developed by team of 4 people:

- Radoslav Maruša (programmer and game designer);
- Stefan Pavelka (game mechanics designer, 2D graphics and animation);
- Martin Demsky (music composer and sound effects creator); and
- Richard Max (3D graphics and rendering).

== Reception ==
Upon its release, Napalm received critical acclaim from the remaining Amiga enthusiast press. It was praised for its "PC-quality" presentation and challenging AI.

Reviews

- Amiga Format - 90%
- Amiga Fever - 92%
- OldGames.ru - 9/10 (Reviewer's rating)
- LemonAmiga.com - 23th place in Top Amiga Strategy Games of all times (User rating)
- LemonAmiga.com - 3rd place in Top Amiga Games of year 1998 (User rating)

Ben Vost of Amiga Format described it as an "absolutely cracking original Amiga game," though he noted that the high system requirements (an Amiga 1200 with an 030 or 060 CPU was recommended) made it inaccessible to some users.

== Legacy ==
The success of Napalm and Crimson Crisis enabled the development of further projects, most notably the real-time strategy video game State of War, released in 2001. A sequel titled Napalm: Euroburn was planned by Ablaze Entertainment but was ultimately canceled. Following the studio’s decline, Stefan Pavelka was the only member of the original team to remain active in the video game industry. He later founded Cypron Studios, which produced State of War. Martin Demsky contributed to State of War as the composer of its soundtrack.
