= Anatema: Legenda o prekliati =

1995 video game

- Developer: Rune Software
- Publisher: Riki Computer Software
- Platform: MS-DOS
- Release: 1995
- Genre: Adventure
- Mode: Single-player

Anatema: Legenda o prekliati is an adventure video game developed by Rune Software and published for MS-DOS in 1995 by Riki Computer Games.

== Gameplay ==
Anatema is a first-person adventure game visually resembling Wolfenstein 3D. The player has to escape from Emare castle where he was captured by an evil ghost.
