= Kult: Heretic Kingdoms =

2004 video game

- Developer(s): 3D People
- Publisher(s): Got Game (NA)
- Director(s): Michal Macák
- Designer(s): Michal Macák; Chris Bateman; Neil Bundy; Richard Boon
- Programmer(s): Ján Turán
- Artist(s): Michal Macák; Dusan Kerekes
- Writer(s): Konstantin Lipatov; Vladimir HalaChris (Story); Chris Bateman; Neil Bundy; Richard Boon
- Composer(s): Sean Kolton
- Series: Heretic Kingdoms
- Engine: Proprietary
- Platform(s): Microsoft Windows, OS X
- Release: SVK: October 1, 2004; NA: April 12, 2005
- Genre(s): Role-playing video game
- Mode(s): Single-player

Kult: Heretic Kingdoms is an isometric role-playing video game, combining 3D technologies with the intuitive environment of an isometric game. It was developed by Slovak studio 3D People, with a storyline written by a script team that includes Chris Bateman and game mechanics designed by the International Hobo team. It was published in North America as Heretic Kingdoms: The Inquisition. On February 27, 2014, the successor of Kult was announced: Shadows: Heretic Kingdoms is the next chapter in the Heretic Kingdoms series.

== Plot ==
Hundreds of years ago, the game world's God was killed by a hero, Arkor, wielding the Godslayer sword. Centuries later, one of his descendants used the power of that sword to institute a theocratic rule, before eventually being defeated. The Inquisition is then established to stamp out any forms of religion in the land. The protagonist, Alita, is an inquisitor-in-training, but also another descendant of Arkor, capable of using the Godslayer sword. The story begins after the mythical sword is stolen by a group of religious zealots intent on resurrecting the God.

The player is tasked with retrieving the legendary artifact. Throughout the course of the game, a series of choices made by the player can lead the protagonist to choose a variety of paths, following or breaking with the Inquisition and changing the game's ending.

== Gameplay ==
The game is played from a third person, isomorphic viewpoint with the main character at the center of the display. The primary character skills (melee, ranged, magic and speed) begin with relatively low ratings, but can be improved as the game progresses and the character gains levels of experience.

To augment the character's capabilities, she can acquire attunements by using various items in combat. Each time the character rests, she can select some of the acquired attunements to effect her abilities. Most of the attunements have a prerequisite that must be satisfied for use. Thus there are attunements that require the heroine to fight without wearing armor. This system rewards the player for trying new weapons and armor acquired from battle. Attunements become permanent once acquired.

The damage system in Heretic Kingdoms uses both hit points and blood points. The character can heal an unlimited number of times, but with each healing the blood points drop; thereby limiting the maximum number of hit points. As a result, during extended combat with multiple heals, the maximum hit points will steadily decrease and the character will be more vulnerable to a hit that will kill her. Both hit points and blood points can be fully restored by sleeping at one of a limited number of campfires, Inn beds, or (if you have purchased a house) in a private bed.

An unusual aspect of the game is the existence of a parallel reality called the Dreamworld. This is inhabited by incorporeal entities such as wraiths and ghosts. The character may briefly escape a perilous situation in the real world by entering the dream world, and use this to travel about. The time allowed in the dream world is limited, however, and that realm has its own set of hazards. The dreamworld can be used to collect essence points that unlock attunements more rapidly.

== Post-mortem ==
In 2014, the game's designer and script writer Chris Bateman wrote a three part post-mortem, discussing how the game came to be made. The first part discusses the origins of the setting, the second the design of the mechanics, and the third the voice recordings with Tom Baker.

== Reception ==
The game scores an aggregate 71/100 on Metacritic, based on 16 reviews.

ESC magazine reviewer Andy Grieser gave the game an 8.0 rating (out of a possible 10). He complimented the crisp graphics, and the innovative attunement system and the "Dreamworld". However, he criticized the superior strength of magic over melee, and thought the Dreamworld setting was underpopulated. Game Over reviewer Steven Carter gave it a 78% rating, with high scores for graphics and gameplay.
