= Tuxánci =

Tuxánci is a free software Czech video game inspired by Bulánci. It was written in the C language, while sound, text and graphics were worked using SDL.

The game is distributed under the GNU GPL version 2 license.

== Interview ==
Sometime in 2007, Jiří Němec interviewed Dušan Ďurech about Tuxánci.
