= Bulánci =

2001 action video game

Bulánci is a Czech freeware action video game created in 2001 by the SleepTeam development group.

== Gameplay and plot ==
The game sees players battle other pillows called EAP (extremely aggressive pillows). It is a 2D game with a top down view. In the game, the pillows used to wage war against the humans and continue to be aggressive with a strong instinct for self-preservation, which led to the assassinations of the pillows among themselves.

== Development ==
Sleep Team was founded in 1996, and their first game Polda was released two years later. Then the team members focused on freeware games.

The developers wanted to create a small free multiplayer game that wouldn't require installation and could be later augmented with new add-ons. Development began at the start of 1999 and before Christmas 2001 the first version of Bulánci was released. It was created on their own DeepSlumber engine. Graphics and script were taken care of by Jaroslav Wagner.

Bulánci became a commercial success, and was the team's most popular game. Over the next few years, new maps, weapons, and feature were added, and in 2005 the latest official version 1.82 was published with a map editor.

In 2003 an English version of Bulánci was created called Combat Pillows, and became one of the first Czech independent games to be internationally distributed using digital keys, singleplayer is available for free and multiplayer is charged. By 2007, Bulánci had hundreds of thousands of players in the Czech Republic and internationally.

In 2009 a Czech version of Bulánci was made in Java for mobile phones, distributed by Czech company Nostromo. It can be played on Android devices with the J2ME Loader application.

In 2012, an unofficial port of Combat Pillows was uploaded to Android platforms. It was later withdrawn from the market and only singleplayer works.

The developers celebrated 15th anniversary of Bulánci in 2016 by launching a new website, set up a Twitter account and printing a limited edition of Bulánci T-shirts.

In 2020, authors of original game announced planned Bulánci 2 with many new features, like fully 3D environment, siege mode, battle royal, singleplayer campaign and others. Announcement was made on Czech crowdfunding platform Startovač, where they've managed to gather needed 500 thousands CZK in few hours, and in the end the final amount reached over 7,3 million crowns.

== Critical reception ==
- Bonusweb called Bulánci "impressive". Mobile Mania wrote that the "Bulánci brand is one of the most valuable Czech trademarks in the field of games".
- Bulánci inspired 2007's Tuxánci.
- In 2003 Bulánci won the Joystick Award.
- At the 5th IMGA awards, Bulánci was nominated for Excellence in Connectivity.
