= List of video games released in 2014 =

The following is a comprehensive index of all games released in 2014, sorted chronologically by release date, and divided by quarter. Information regarding developer, publisher, operating system, genre, and type of release is provided where available

For a summary of 2014 in video games as a whole, see 2014 in video games.

== Legend ==
Video game platforms
| 3DS | Nintendo 3DS, 3DS Virtual Console, iQue 3DS | DC | Dreamcast | DROID | Android |
| DS | Nintendo DS, DSiWare, iQue DS | FOS | Fire OS | GS | GameStick |
| iOS | iOS, iPhone, iPod, iPadOS, iPad, visionOS, Apple Vision Pro | LIN | Linux, SteamOS | OSX | macOS |
| OUYA | Ouya | PS3 | PlayStation 3 | PS4 | PlayStation 4 |
| PSN | PlayStation Network | PSP | PlayStation Portable | PSV | PlayStation Vita |
| Wii | Wii, WiiWare, Wii Virtual Console | WiiU | Wii U, WiiU Virtual Console | WIN | Windows, all versions Windows 95 and up |
| WP | Windows Phone | XB360 | Xbox 360, Xbox 360 Live Arcade | XBO | Xbox One |

Types of releases
| Compilation | A compilation, anthology or collection of several titles, usually (but not always) belonging to the same series |
| Early access | A game launched in early access is unfinished and thus might contain bugs and glitches or have some of the content missing |
| Episodic | An episodic video game that is released in batches over a period of time |
| Expansion | A large-scale DLC to an already existing game that adds new story, areas and additions and/or changes to the game's mechanics |
| Full release | A full release of a game that launched in early access first |
| Limited | A special release (often called "Limited" or "Collector's Edition") with bonus collector's material. Often provided to people who pre-order a game |
| Port | The game first appeared on a different platform and a port was made. The game is like the original, with few or no differences |
| Remake | The game is an enhanced remake of an original, made using a new engine and/or assets and thus containing completely new sound, graphics and possibly changes to the story and/or gameplay |
| Remaster | The game is a remaster of an original, released on the same or different platform, with (usually minor) changes to graphics, sound and/or gameplay |
| Rerelease | The game was re-released on the same platform with no or only minor changes |

Video game genres
| 4X | 4X game | Action | Action game | Action RPG | Action role-playing game |
| Action-adventure | Action-adventure game | Adventure | Adventure game | Brawler | Beat 'em up |
| Business sim | Business simulation game | City builder | City-building game | CMS | Construction and management simulation |
| DCCG | Digital collectible card game | Digital tabletop | Digital tabletop game | Dungeon crawl | Dungeon crawl |
| Educational | Educational video game | Endless runner | Endless runner | Fighting | Fighting game |
| FPS | First-person shooter | God game | God game | Government sim | Government simulation game |
| Graphic adventure | Graphic adventure | Hack and slash | Hack and slash | Interactive film | Interactive film |
| Life sim | Life simulation game | Metroidvania | Metroidvania | MMO | Massively multiplayer online game |
| MOBA | Multiplayer online battle arena | Music | Music video game | Party | Party video game |
| PCA | Point-and-click adventure | Platformer | Platformer | Puzzle | Puzzle video game |
| Puzzle-platformer | Puzzle-platformer | Racing | Racing video game | Rhythm | Rhythm game |
| Roguelike | Roguelike, Roguelite | RPG | Role-playing video game | RTS | Real-time strategy |
| RTT | Real-time tactics | Sandbox | Sandbox game | Shoot 'em up | Shoot 'em up |
| Shooter | Shooter game | Simulation | Simulation video game | Sports | Sports video game |
| Stealth | Stealth game | Strategy | Strategy video game | Survival | Survival game |
| Survival horror | Survival horror | Tactical RPG | Tactical role-playing game | Tactical shooter | Tactical shooter |
| TBS | Turn-based strategy | TBT | Turn-based tactics | Tower defense | Tower defense |
| TPS | Third-person shooter | Vehicle sim | Vehicle simulation game | Vehicular combat | Vehicular combat game |
| Virtual pet | Virtual pet | Visual novel | Visual novel | | |

== List ==
=== January–March ===
| Release date | Title | Platform | Type | Genre | Developer | Publisher | Ref. |
|---|---|---|---|---|---|---|---|
| January 2 | Sonic & All-Stars Racing Transformed | iOS, DROID | | Racing | | | |
| January 7 | Don't Starve: Console Edition | PS4 | | Survival | | | |
| January 7 | RoboCop | iOS | | | | | |
| January 7 | Tiny Brains | PSN | | | | | |
| January 8 | Consortium | WIN | | RPG, FPS | | | |
| January 9 | Castle Doombad | iOS | | Tower defense | | | |
| January 9 | Chibi-Robo! Photo Finder | 3DS | | Platformer | | | |
| January 9 | Duke Nukem: Manhattan Project | iOS | | Platformer | | | |
| January 9 | Joe Danger Infinity | iOS | | Endless runner | | | |
| January 9 | Metal Gear Rising: Revengeance | WIN | Port | Action, Hack and slash | | | |
| January 9 | Rhythm Thief & The Paris Caper | iOS | | Rhythm, Puzzle, Adventure | | | |
| January 13 | Nidhogg | WIN | | Fighting | | | |
| January 14 | Age of Zombies | PSV | | | | | |
| January 14 | Assassin's Creed Liberation HD | PSN | | Action-adventure, Stealth | | | |
| January 14 | The Banner Saga | WIN, OSX, LIN, iOS, XB360 | | Tactical RPG | | | |
| January 15 | Assassin's Creed Liberation HD | WIN, XB360 | | Action-adventure, Stealth | | | |
| January 15 | Final Fantasy VI | DROID | | RPG | | | |
| January 16 | Bardbarian | iOS | | Action | | | |
| January 16 | F1 Race Stars | WiiU | | Racing (kart) | | | |
| January 16 | Guilty Gear Isuka | WIN | | Fighting | | | |
| January 16 | NBA Rush | iOS | | | | | |
| January 16 | Shadow Blade | iOS | | Platformer | | | |
| January 16 | Unepic | WiiU | | Platformer, RPG, Metroidvania | | | |
| January 20 | KickBeat | WIN | | Music, Rhythm | | | |
| January 21 | Lucifer Ring | PSN | | | | | |
| January 22 | Deus Ex: The Fall | DROID | | Action RPG, FPS, Stealth | | | |
| January 22 | Insurgency | WIN | | FPS | | | |
| January 22 | OlliOlli | PSV | | Sports | | | |
| January 23 | Might & Magic X: Legacy | WIN | | RPG | | | |
| January 23 | Tomb Raider | OSX | | Action-adventure | | | |
| January 27 | Grand Theft Auto: San Andreas Mobile | WP | | Action-adventure | | | |
| January 27 | Redux: Dark Matters | DC | | Shoot 'em up | | | |
| January 28 | Broken Age Act 1 | WIN, OSX, LIN | | PCA | | | |
| January 28 | Dragon Ball Z: Battle of Z | PS3, PSV, XB360 | | Action RPG | | | |
| January 28 | Rekoil | WIN | | FPS | | | |
| January 28 | Soul Fjord | OUYA | | Roguelike, Rhythm | | | |
| January 28 | Tomb Raider: Definitive Edition | PS4, XBO | | Action-adventure | | | |
| January 29 | Rekoil: Liberator | XB360 | | FPS | | | |
| January 30 | Hero of Many | GS | | Action-adventure | | | |
| January 30 | Octodad: Dadliest Catch | WIN, OSX, LIN | | Adventure | | | |
| January 30 | Rocket Robo | iOS, DROID | | Puzzle | | | |
| January 31 | Halo: Spartan Assault | XB360 | | Shoot 'em up (twin-stick) | | | |
| January 31 | Loadout | WIN | | TPS | | | |
| February 4 | Dustforce | PSN, PSV | | Platformer | | | |
| February 4 | Fable Anniversary | XB360 | | Action RPG | | | |
| February 4 | Outlast | PS4 | | Survival horror | | | |
| February 4 | The Wolf Among Us - Episode 2: Smoke and Mirrors | WIN, OSX, PSN | | Graphic adventure | | | |
| February 5 | The Wolf Among Us - Episode 2: Smoke and Mirrors | XB360 | | Graphic adventure | | | |
| February 6 | Broken Sword 5: The Serpent's Curse - Episode 1 | iOS | | PCA | | | |
| February 6 | Double Dragon Neon | WIN | | Brawler | | | |
| February 6 | Final Fantasy VI | iOS | | RPG | | | |
| February 6 | Retro City Rampage DX | 3DS | | Action-adventure | | | |
| February 6 | The Wolf Among Us - Episode 2: Smoke and Mirrors | iOS | | Graphic adventure | | | |
| February 6 | Threes | iOS | | Puzzle | | | |
| February 7 | The Lego Movie Videogame | WIN, PS3, XB360, PS4, XBO, WiiU | | Action-adventure | | | |
| February 7 | Bravely Default | 3DS | | RPG | | | |
| February 7 | Jazzpunk | WIN, LIN, OSX | | Adventure | | | |
| February 11 | Danganronpa: Trigger Happy Havoc | PSV | | Adventure, Visual novel | | | |
| February 11 | Far Cry Classic | PSN, XB360 | | FPS | | | |
| February 11 | Lightning Returns: Final Fantasy XIII | PS3, XB360 | | Action RPG | | | |
| February 11 | One Piece: Romance Dawn | 3DS | | RPG | | | |
| February 11 | Skullgirls Encore | PS3 | | Fighting | | | |
| February 11 | Toukiden: The Age of Demons | PSV, PSP | | Action RPG | | | |
| February 11 | TxK | PSV | | Shoot 'em up (tube) | | | |
| February 12 | World of Tanks: Xbox 360 Edition | XB360 | | Vehicular combat, MMO | | | |
| February 13 | Adventure Time Card Wars | DROID, iOS | | | | | |
| February 13 | AeternoBlade | 3DS | | | | | |
| February 13 | BlazBlue: Calamity Trigger | WIN | | Fighting | | | |
| February 13 | Deadman's Cross | iOS | | | | | |
| February 13 | Inazuma Eleven | 3DS | | | | | |
| February 13 | NaissanceE | WIN | | Adventure | | | |
| February 13 | Steel Diver: Sub Wars | 3DS | | Vehicle sim (submarine) | | | |
| February 14 | The Last of Us: Left Behind | PS3 | Expansion | Action-adventure, Survival horror | | | |
| February 14 | LocoCycle | WIN, XB360 | | Racing, Vehicular combat | | | |
| February 18 | Assassin's Creed Freedom Cry | PS3, PS4 | | Action-adventure, Stealth | | | |
| February 18 | Banished | WIN | | City builder, Strategy | | | |
| February 18 | Earth Defense Force 2025 | PS3, XB360 | | TPS | | | |
| February 18 | Guacamelee! Gold Edition | OSX, LIN | | Metroidvania, Platformer, Brawler | | | |
| February 18 | Ikaruga | WIN | | Shoot 'em up | | | |
| February 18 | NASCAR '14 | WIN, PS3, XB360 | | Sports, Racing | | | |
| February 18 | Rayman Legends | PS4, XBO | | Platformer | | | |
| February 18 | Strider | PS3, PS4, XB360, XBO, WIN | | Hack and slash, Metroidvania | | | |
| February 20 | Plague Inc: Evolved | WIN | | RTS, Simulation | | | |
| February 20 | Quell Reflect | 3DS | | | | | |
| February 20 | Tengami | iOS | | Adventure, Puzzle | | | |
| February 20 | Weapon Shop De Omasse | 3DS | | RPG, Rhythm | | | |
| February 21 | Disco Zoo | iOS, DROID | | Simulation | | | |
| February 21 | Donkey Kong Country: Tropical Freeze | WiiU | | Platformer | | | |
| February 21 | El Chavo Kart | PS3, XB360 | | Racing | | | |
| February 21 | Rambo: The Video Game | PS3, XB360, WIN | | Shoot 'em up (rail) | | | |
| February 25 | Assassin's Creed Freedom Cry | WIN | | Action-adventure, Stealth | | | |
| February 25 | Basement Crawl | PS4 | | Action | | | |
| February 25 | Castlevania: Lords of Shadow 2 | WIN, PS3, XB360 | | Action-adventure, Hack and slash | | | |
| February 25 | Fractured Soul | WIN | | | | | |
| February 25 | Magus | PS3 | | RPG, Action-adventure | | | |
| February 25 | Pac-Man Museum | WIN, PS3, XB360 | | | | | |
| February 25 | Plants vs. Zombies: Garden Warfare | XBO, XB360 | | TPS, Tower defense | | | |
| February 25 | Tales of Symphonia Chronicles | PS3 | | RPG | | | |
| February 25 | Thief | WIN, PS3, PS4, XB360, XBO | | Stealth | | | |
| February 27 | Resident Evil 4: Ultimate HD Edition | WIN | Remaster | Survival horror, TPS | | | |
| February 27 | Tappingo | 3DS | | | | | |
| February 28 | Professor Layton and the Azran Legacy | 3DS | | Puzzle, Adventure | | | |
| March 2 | Alphadia Genesis | iOS | | | | | |
| March 4 | Awesomenauts Assemble! | PS4 | | MOBA | | | |
| March 4 | Dead Nation: Apocalypse Edition | PS4 | | Shoot 'em up | | | |
| March 4 | Hatsune Miku: Project DIVA F | PSV | | Rhythm | | | |
| March 4 | Master Reboot | PSN | | | | | |
| March 4 | Shadow Blade | OUYA | | Platformer | | | |
| March 4 | South Park: The Stick of Truth | WIN, PS3, XB360 | | RPG | | | |
| March 4 | The Walking Dead: Season Two - Episode 2: A House Divided | WIN, OSX, PSN, XB360 | | Graphic adventure, Interactive film | | | |
| March 6 | F1 2013 | OSX | | Racing | | | |
| March 6 | Smash Hit | iOS, DROID | | Shoot 'em up (rail) | | | |
| March 7 | Surgeon Simulator 2013 | iOS | | Simulation | | | |
| March 7 | The Walking Dead: Season Two - Episode 2: A House Divided | iOS | | Graphic adventure, Interactive film | | | |
| March 10 | Lego Legends of Chima Online | iOS | | MMO, RPG | | | |
| March 11 | Atelier Escha & Logy: Alchemists of the Dusk Sky | PS3 | | RPG | | | |
| March 11 | Dark Souls II | PS3, XB360 | | Action RPG | | | |
| March 11 | Hearthstone: Heroes of Warcraft | WIN, OSX | | DCCG | | | |
| March 11 | Titanfall | WIN, XBO | | FPS | | | |
| March 11 | TowerFall Ascension | PS4, WIN | | Action | | | |
| March 11 | Vessel | PS3 | | Puzzle-platformer | | | |
| March 12 | Constant C | XB360 | | | | | |
| March 12 | Threes | DROID | | Puzzle | | | |
| March 14 | Fortoresse | WIN, OSX, LIN | | | | | |
| March 14 | Yoshi's New Island | 3DS | | Platformer | | | |
| March 15 | Broken Sword 5: The Serpent's Curse - Episode 1 | DROID | | PCA | | | |
| March 17 | 999: Nine Hours, Nine Persons, Nine Doors | iOS | | Adventure, Visual novel | | | |
| March 18 | Deus Ex: The Fall | WIN | | Action RPG, FPS, Stealth | | | |
| March 18 | Final Fantasy X/X-2 HD Remaster | PS3, PSV | | RPG | | | |
| March 18 | Luftrausers | WIN, OSX, LIN, PS3, PSV | | Shoot 'em up | | | |
| March 18 | Metal Gear Solid V: Ground Zeroes | PS3, PS4, XB360, XBO | | Action-adventure, Stealth | | | |
| March 18 | Stealth Inc: A Clone in the Dark: Ultimate Edition | PS4 | | Platformer, Stealth | | | |
| March 18 | SteamWorld Dig | PS4, PSV | | Platformer, Action-adventure, Metroidvania | | | |
| March 18 | Yaiba: Ninja Gaiden Z | PS3, XB360 | | Action, Hack and slash | | | |
| March 20 | Pokémon Battle Trozei | 3DS | | Puzzle | | | |
| March 20 | Pure Chess | 3DS, WiiU | | Digital tabletop | | | |
| March 20 | Yumi's Odd Odyssey | 3DS | | Platformer | | | |
| March 21 | Infamous: Second Son | PS4 | | Action-adventure | | | |
| March 21 | Yaiba: Ninja Gaiden Z | WIN | | Action, Hack and slash | | | |
| March 24 | Escape Goat 2 | WIN, OSX, LIN | | Puzzle | | | |
| March 25 | BioShock Infinite: Burial At Sea-Episode 2 | WIN, PS3, XB360 | Expansion | FPS, Stealth | | | |
| March 25 | BlazBlue: Chrono Phantasma | PS3 | | Fighting | | | |
| March 25 | Cut the Rope: Triple Treat | 3DS | | Puzzle | | | |
| March 25 | Deception IV: Blood Ties | PS3, PSV | | Action RPG, Tactical RPG | | | |
| March 25 | Destiny of Spirits | PSV | | Strategy, RPG | | | |
| March 25 | Diablo III: Reaper of Souls | WIN, OSX | | Action RPG, Hack and slash | | | |
| March 25 | Dynasty Warriors 8:Xtreme Legends | PS3, PS4, PSV | | Hack and slash, Action | | | |
| March 25 | Ether One | WIN | | Adventure | | | |
| March 25 | Fez | PSN, PS4, PSV | | Puzzle-platformer | | | |
| March 25 | Little Tail Story (Japan) | iOS, DROID | | RPG | | | |
| March 25 | Mercenary Kings | WIN | | Shoot 'em up | | | |
| March 25 | Smite | WIN | | MOBA | | | |
| March 25 | The Witch and the Hundred Knight | PS3 | | Action RPG | | | |
| March 27 | Castlevania: Lords of Shadow – Mirror of Fate HD | WIN | | Action-adventure, Hack and slash | | | |
| March 27 | I Am An Air Traffic Controller Airport Hero Hawaii | 3DS | | Simulation | | | |
| March 28 | Cut the Rope 2 | DROID | | | | | |
| March 31 | Age of Wonders III | WIN, OSX | | 4X, TBS | | | |

=== April–June ===
| Release date | Title | Platform | Type | Genre | Developer | Publisher | Ref. |
|---|---|---|---|---|---|---|---|
| April 1 | Batman: Arkham Origins Blackgate | WIN, PSN, XB360, WiiU | | Action-adventure, Brawler, Stealth, Metroidvania | | | |
| April 1 | Goat Simulator | WIN | | Action | | | |
| April 1 | Mercenary Kings | PS4 | | Shoot 'em up | | | |
| April 1 | MLB 14: The Show | PS3, PSV | | Sports | | | |
| April 1 | Ragnarok Odyssey Ace | PS3, PSV | | RPG | | | |
| April 3 | Don Bradman Cricket 14 | PS3, XB360 | | Sports | | | |
| April 3 | FTL: Advanced Edition | iOS | | Strategy, Roguelike | | | |
| April 3 | Metroid Fusion | WiiU | | Action-adventure | | | |
| April 3 | Monument Valley | iOS | | Puzzle | | | |
| April 3 | Rusty's Real Deal Baseball | 3DS | | Sports | | | |
| April 4 | The Elder Scrolls Online | WIN, OSX | | MMO, RPG | | | |
| April 4 | Half-Minute Hero: The Second Coming | WIN | | Action RPG | | | |
| April 4 | Kazooloo | DROID, iOS | | Action | | | |
| April 8 | Kinect Sports Rivals | XBO | | Sports | | | |
| April 8 | LEGO: The Hobbit | WIN, PS3, PS4, WiiU, XB360, XBO, 3DS, PSV | | Action-adventure | | | |
| April 8 | Strike Suit Zero: Director's Cut | PS4, XBO | | Vehicular combat (spaceship) | | | |
| April 8 | The Wolf Among Us - Episode 3: A Crooked Mile | WIN, OSX, PSN | | Graphic adventure | | | |
| April 8 | Titanfall | XB360 | | FPS | | | |
| April 9 | The Wolf Among Us - Episode 3: A Crooked Mile | XB360 | | Graphic adventure | | | |
| April 10 | RollerCoaster Tycoon 4 Mobile | iOS | | CMS | | | |
| April 10 | The Wolf Among Us - Episode 3: A Crooked Mile | iOS | | Graphic adventure | | | |
| April 10 | Tom Clancy's Ghost Recon Phantoms | WIN | | Tactical shooter | | | |
| April 10 | Trials Frontier | iOS | | Racing, Platformer | | | |
| April 11 | Contagion | WIN | | FPS, Survival horror | | | |
| April 11 | Disney Magical World | 3DS | | Life sim | | | |
| April 11 | Football Manager Classic 2014 | PSV | | Sports, Business sim | | | |
| April 14 | Final Fantasy XIV: A Realm Reborn | PS4 | | MMO, RPG | | | |
| April 15 | 2014 FIFA World Cup Brazil | PS3, XB360 | | Sports | | | |
| April 15 | Backgammon Blitz | PSN, PS4, PSV | | | | | |
| April 15 | Conception II: Children of the Seven Stars | PSV, 3DS | | RPG | | | |
| April 15 | Dead Nation: Apocalypse Edition | PSV | | Shoot 'em up | | | |
| April 15 | Deus Ex: Human Revolution – Director's Cut | OSX | | Action RPG, FPS, Stealth | | | |
| April 15 | Moebius: Empire Rising | WIN, OSX | | Graphic adventure | | | |
| April 15 | No Heroes Allowed: No Puzzles Either | PSV | | | | | |
| April 15 | Pure Chess | PS4 | | Digital tabletop | | | |
| April 15 | War of the Vikings | WIN | | Action, Hack and slash | | | |
| April 16 | Broken Sword 5: The Serpent's Curse - Episode 2 | WIN, OSX, LIN | | PCA | | | |
| April 16 | Hearthstone: Heroes of Warcraft | iOS | | DCCG | | | |
| April 16 | Trials Fusion | XB360, XBO, PS4 | | Platformer, Racing | | | |
| April 17 | Agarest: Generations of War Zero | WIN | | Tactical RPG | | | |
| April 17 | Baldur's Gate: Enhanced Edition | DROID | | RPG | | | |
| April 17 | Bit Boy!! Arcade | 3DS | | Action | | | |
| April 17 | Hitman Go | iOS | | Puzzle | | | |
| April 17 | Secrets of Rætikon | WIN, OSX, LIN | | Action-adventure | | | |
| April 17 | Smash Cat Heroes | 3DS | | | | | |
| April 17 | Summoners War: Sky Arena | iOS, DROID | | RPG | Com2uS | Com2uS | |
| April 18 | Wargame: Red Dragon | WIN | | RTS | | | |
| April 22 | Demon Gaze | PSV | | RPG, Dungeon crawl | | | |
| April 22 | Octodad: Dadliest Catch | PS4 | | Adventure | | | |
| April 22 | Skullgirls Encore | XB360 | | Fighting | | | |
| April 22 | Soulcalibur: Lost Swords | PSN | | Fighting | | | |
| April 22 | The Walking Dead: Season 2 - Episode 1: All That Remains | PSV | | Graphic adventure | | | |
| April 22 | The Walking Dead: Season 2 - Episode 2: A House Divided | PSV | | Graphic adventure | | | |
| April 22 | Warface | XB360 | | FPS | | | |
| April 22 | Fract OSC | WIN, OSX | | Puzzle, Rhythm | | | |
| April 23 | XCOM: Enemy Unknown | DROID | | TBT, Tactical RPG | | | |
| April 24 | 9 Elefants | iOS, DROID | | Puzzle | | | |
| April 24 | Blackwell Epiphany | WIN | | Graphic adventure | | | |
| April 24 | Trials Fusion | WIN | | Platformer, Racing | | | |
| April 24 | Wayward Souls | iOS | | Action-adventure | | | |
| April 25 | Dark Souls II | WIN | | Action RPG | | | |
| April 25 | Dustforce | XB360 | | Platformer | | | |
| April 25 | NES Remix 2 | WiiU | | Action | | | |
| April 28 | The Undead Syndrome 2 | XB360 | | | | | |
| April 29 | Daylight | WIN, PS4 | | Survival horror | | | |
| April 29 | Gardening Mama 2: Forest Friends | 3DS | | Simulation | | | |
| April 29 | JoJo's Bizarre Adventure: All Star Battle | PS3 | | Fighting | | | |
| April 29 | Raiden IV: Overkill | PS3 | | Shoot 'em up | | | |
| April 29 | The Amazing Spider-Man 2 | WIN, PS3, PS4, WiiU, XB360, 3DS, iOS, DROID | | Action-adventure | | | |
| April 29 | Yu-Gi-Oh! Millennium Duels | PS3 | | | | | |
| April 30 | BloodRayne: Betrayal | WIN | | Action-adventure, Hack and slash | | | |
| April 30 | Child of Light | WIN, PSN, PS4, WiiU, XB360, XBO | | Platformer, RPG | | | |
| April 30 | Croixleur | WIN | | | | | |
| May 1 | Botanicula | iOS | | Graphic adventure | | | |
| May 1 | Metal Slug Defense | iOS, DROID | | | | | |
| May 1 | Picross e4 | 3DS | | | | | |
| May 1 | Project Root | WIN | | | | | |
| May 1 | Sir, You Are Being Hunted | WIN, OSX, LIN | | Survival horror, Stealth | | | |
| May 1 | Stick It To The Man! | WiiU | | | | | |
| May 1 | Superfrog HD | iOS | | Platformer | | | |
| May 2 | Kirby: Triple Deluxe | 3DS | | Platformer | HAL Laboratory | Nintendo | |
| May 2 | Mario Golf: World Tour | 3DS | | Sports | | | |
| May 2 | République: Episode 2 | iOS | | Action-adventure, Stealth | | | |
| May 6 | God of War Collection | PSV | | Action-adventure, Hack and slash | | | |
| May 6 | MLB 14: The Show | PS4 | | Sports | | | |
| May 6 | Sportsfriends | PS3, PS4 | | Party | | | |
| May 6 | Wordament Snap Attack | WIN, WP | | | | | |
| May 7 | Blade Symphony | WIN | | Action | | | |
| May 7 | Peggle 2 | XB360 | | Puzzle | | | |
| May 7 | Tesla Effect: A Tex Murphy Adventure | WIN, OSX | | Adventure | | | |
| May 8 | Lego Marvel Super Heroes | OSX | | Action-adventure | | | |
| May 8 | Nutjitsu | XBO | | | | | |
| May 8 | The Denpa Men 3: The Rise of Digitoll | 3DS | | RPG | | | |
| May 8 | Wario Land 4 | WiiU | | Platformer | | | |
| May 8 | Sit 'n' Survive | WIN | | Tower Defense | Scott Cawthon | | |
| May 9 | Bound by Flame | WIN, PS4, PS3, XB360 | | Action RPG | | | |
| May 12 | The Amazing Spider-Man 2 | XBO | | Action-adventure | | | |
| May 13 | Borderlands 2 | PSV | | Action RPG, FPS | | | |
| May 13 | Dynasty Warriors 8: Xtreme Legends Complete Edition | WIN | | Hack and slash, Action | | | |
| May 13 | Serious Sam 3: BFE | PS3 | | FPS | | | |
| May 13 | The Walking Dead: Season Two - Episode 3: In Harm's Way | WIN, OSX, PSN | | Graphic adventure | | | |
| May 14 | Super Time Force | XB360, XBO | | Action, Adventure, Shooter | | | |
| May 14 | The Walking Dead: Season Two - Episode 3: In Harm's Way | XB360 | | Graphic adventure | | | |
| May 15 | BattleBlock Theater | WIN, LIN | | Platformer | | | |
| May 15 | Grand Theft Auto III: 10 Year Anniversary Edition | FOS | | Action-adventure | | | |
| May 15 | Grand Theft Auto: Vice City 10th Anniversary Edition | FOS | | Action-adventure | | | |
| May 15 | Grand Theft Auto: San Andreas 10 Year Anniversary Edition | FOS | | Action-adventure | | | |
| May 15 | Hitman: Absolution — Elite Edition | OSX | | Stealth | | | |
| May 15 | Table Tennis Touch | iOS | | Sports (table tennis) | | | |
| May 15 | Thomas Was Alone | iOS | | Puzzle-platformer | | | |
| May 20 | Ascend: Hand of Kul | WIN | | RPG | | | |
| May 20 | Drakengard 3 | PS3 | | Action RPG, Hack and slash | | | |
| May 20 | Mugen Souls Z | PS3 | | RPG | | | |
| May 20 | Transistor | WIN, PS4 | | Action RPG, TBS | | | |
| May 20 | Vertical Drop Heroes HD | WIN, OSX | | | | | |
| May 20 | Wolfenstein: The New Order | WIN, PS3, PS4, XB360, XBO | Original | Action-adventure, FPS | | | |
| May 21 | Trials Frontier | DROID | | Racing, Platformer | | | |
| May 21 | Turbo Dismount | WIN | | Vehicle sim, Sandbox | | | |
| May 22 | Drawn to Life | iOS | | Action-adventure, Platformer | | | |
| May 22 | Squids Odyssey | WiiU | | Tactical RPG | | | |
| May 22 | Swords & Soldiers | WiiU | | RTS | | | |
| May 22 | The Incredible Adventures of Van Helsing II | WIN | | Action RPG | | | |
| May 22 | The Witcher 2: Assassins of Kings Enhanced Edition | LIN | | Action RPG | | | |
| May 23 | Distant Worlds: Universe | WIN | | | | | |
| May 23 | Killer is Dead: Nightmare Edition | WIN | | Action, Hack and slash | | | |
| May 23 | Tropico 5 | WIN | | CMS, Government sim | | | |
| May 26 | Ibb and Obb | WIN | | Puzzle-platformer | | | |
| May 27 | Ace Combat Infinity | PS3 | | Vehicular combat (plane) | | | |
| May 27 | Final Fantasy III | WIN | | RPG | | | |
| May 27 | Mind Zero | PSV | | RPG, Dungeon crawl | | | |
| May 27 | Monster Monpiece | PSV | | DCCG | | | |
| May 27 | The Wolf Among Us - Episode 4: In Sheep's Clothing | WIN, OSX, PSN | | Graphic adventure | | | |
| May 27 | Watch Dogs | WIN, PS3, PS4, XB360, XBO | Original | Action-adventure | | | |
| May 27 | Whispering Willows | OUYA | | Adventure | | | |
| May 28 | A Story About My Uncle | WIN | | Adventure | | | |
| May 28 | Dragon Quest VIII: Journey of the Cursed King | DROID, iOS | | RPG | | | |
| May 28 | Monochroma | WIN | | Cinematic platformer, Puzzle-platformer | | | |
| May 28 | Skulls of the Shogun | DROID | | TBT | | | |
| May 28 | The Wolf Among Us - Episode 4: In Sheep's Clothing | XB360 | | Graphic adventure | | | |
| May 29 | Among the Sleep | WIN, OSX, LIN | | Survival horror, Action-adventure | | | |
| May 29 | The Wolf Among Us - Episode 4: In Sheep's Clothing | iOS | | Graphic adventure | | | |
| May 29 | Klonoa: Empire of Dreams | WiiU | | Platformer | | | |
| May 30 | Astebreed | WIN | | Action, Shoot 'em up | | | |
| May 30 | Broken Age Act 1 | OUYA | | PCA | | | |
| May 30 | Mario Kart 8 | WiiU | | Racing (kart) | | | |
| May 30 | Push Panic | DROID | | Tile-matching | | | |
| May 30 | TowerFall Ascension | OSX, LIN | | Action | | | |
| June 3 | 1001 Spikes | WIN, PS3, PS4, XB360, XBO, 3DS, WiiU | | Platformer, Adventure | | | |
| June 3 | Murdered: Soul Suspect | WIN, PS3, PS4, XB360, XBO | | Action-adventure, Stealth | | | |
| June 3 | PixelJunk Shooter | PS3, PSV | | Shoot 'em up | | | |
| June 3 | PixelJunk Shooter 2 | PS3, PSV | | Shoot 'em up | | | |
| June 3 | PlayStation Vita Pets | PSV | | Virtual pet | | | |
| June 3 | WildStar | WIN | | MMO, RPG | | | |
| June 3 | Worms Battlegrounds | PS4, XBO | | Artillery, Strategy | | | |
| June 4 | Hitman Go | DROID | | Puzzle | | | |
| June 4 | Marvel Heroes 2015 | WIN | | MMO, Action RPG | | | |
| June 6 | Crimzon Clover: World Ignition | WIN | | Shoot 'em up | | | |
| June 6 | Haunt the House: Terrortown | WIN | | Action, Puzzle | | | |
| June 6 | Lifeless Planet | WIN, OSX | | Puzzle-platformer | | | |
| June 6 | Tomodachi Life | 3DS | | Life sim | | | |
| June 9 | Entwined | PS4 | | Rhythm | | | |
| June 10 | Civilization V | LIN | | TBS, 4X | | | |
| June 10 | Enemy Front | WIN, PS3, XB360 | | FPS | | | |
| June 11 | VVVVVV | OUYA | | Puzzle-platformer | | | |
| June 12 | AiRace Xeno | 3DS | | | | | |
| June 12 | Broken Age Act 1 | iOS | | PCA | | | |
| June 12 | VVVVVV | DROID, iOS | | Puzzle-platformer | | | |
| June 17 | Battle Princess of Arcadias | PS3 | | | | | |
| June 17 | EA Sports UFC | PS4, XBO | | Fighting, Sports | | | |
| June 17 | Tales from Space: Mutant Blobs Attack | PSN | | Platformer | | | |
| June 17 | Xenonauts | WIN | | Strategy, TBT | | | |
| June 18 | Castle of Illusion Starring Mickey Mouse | DROID | | Platformer | | | |
| June 18 | Tales from Space: Mutant Blobs Attack | XB360 | | Platformer | | | |
| June 19 | Pushmo World | WiiU | | Puzzle | | | |
| June 19 | How to Survive | WiiU | | Action RPG, Survival horror, Survival | | | |
| June 19 | Outlast | XBO | | Survival horror | | | |
| June 19 | Pro Cycling Manager Season 2014: Le Tour de France | WIN | | Simulation | | | |
| June 19 | XCOM: Enemy Unknown | LIN | | TBT, Tactical RPG | | | |
| June 19 | XCOM: Enemy Within | LIN | | TBT | | | |
| June 24 | Atelier Rorona Plus: The Alchemist of Arland | PS3, PSV | | RPG | | | |
| June 24 | BlazBlue: Chrono Phantasma | PSV | | Fighting | | | |
| June 24 | Company of Heroes 2 - The Western Front Armies | WIN | | RTS | | | |
| June 24 | Grid Autosport | WIN, PS3, XB360 | | Racing | | | |
| June 24 | Plants vs. Zombies: Garden Warfare | WIN | | TPS, Tower defense | | | |
| June 24 | Transformers: Rise of the Dark Spark | WIN, XB360, XBO, PS4, PS3, WiiU, 3DS | | TPS, Strategy, RPG | | | |
| June 24 | Valiant Hearts: The Great War | PSN, PS4 | | Puzzle, Adventure | | | |
| June 24 | Xblaze Code: Embryo | PS3, PSV | | Visual novel | | | |
| June 25 | Another World-20th Anniversary Edition | PS3, PS4, PSV, XBO | | Cinematic platformer, Action-adventure | | | |
| June 25 | The World Ends with You | DROID | | Action RPG | | | |
| June 25 | Valiant Hearts: The Great War | WIN, XB360, XBO | | Puzzle, Adventure | | | |
| June 26 | Contrast | XBO | | Puzzle-platformer | | | |
| June 26 | Don Bradman Cricket 14 | WIN | | Sports | | | |
| June 26 | Shovel Knight | WiiU, 3DS, WIN | | Action, Platformer | | | |
| June 27 | Goat Simulator | OSX, LIN | | Action | | | |
| June 27 | Sniper Elite III | WIN | Original | Tactical shooter, Stealth | | | |
| June 30 | Disney Tsum Tsum | iOS | | | | | |
| June 30 | Divinity: Original Sin | WIN, OSX | | RPG | | | |

=== July–September ===
| Release date | Title | Platform | Type | Genre | Developer | Publisher | Ref. |
|---|---|---|---|---|---|---|---|
| July 1 | Age of Zombies | OUYA | | | | | |
| July 1 | Child of Light | PSV | | Platformer, RPG | | | |
| July 1 | Dynasty Warriors: Gundam Reborn | PS3, PSV | | Action RPG, Hack and slash | | | |
| July 1 | Guacamelee! Super Turbo Championship Edition | PS4 | | Metroidvania, Platformer, Brawler | | | |
| July 1 | Monsters Ate My Birthday Cake | iOS, WIN | | Puzzle | | | |
| July 1 | Puddle | PS4 | | Puzzle-platformer | | | |
| July 1 | Sniper Elite III | PS3, PS4, XB360, XBO | Port | Tactical shooter, Stealth | | | |
| July 2 | Civilization Revolution 2 | iOS | | TBS | | | |
| July 2 | Guacamelee! Super Turbo Championship Edition | XB360, XBO, WiiU | | Metroidvania, Platformer, Brawler | | | |
| July 3 | Armillo | WiiU | | Action, Puzzle-platformer | | | |
| July 3 | Bike Rider DX2: Galaxy | 3DS | | | | | |
| July 3 | Monster Hunter Freedom Unite | iOS | | Action RPG | | | |
| July 3 | Squids Odyssey | 3DS | | Tactical RPG | | | |
| July 8 | One Piece: Unlimited World RED | 3DS, WiiU, PS3, PSV | | Action-adventure | | | |
| July 8 | The Wolf Among Us - Episode 5: Cry Wolf | WIN, OSX, PSN | | Graphic adventure | | | |
| July 9 | Sakura Spirit | WIN | | Visual novel | | | |
| July 9 | The Wolf Among Us - Episode 5: Cry Wolf | XB360 | | Graphic adventure | | | |
| July 9 | Whispering Willows | WIN | | Adventure | | | |
| July 10 | Quest for Infamy | WIN, OSX, LIN | | | | | |
| July 10 | Sonic Jump Fever | iOS, DROID | | Platformer | | | |
| July 10 | The Wolf Among Us - Episode 5: Cry Wolf | iOS | | Graphic adventure | | | |
| July 10 | Urban Trial Freestyle | iOS | | Racing | | | |
| July 14 | Abyss Odyssey | WIN, PS3, XB360 | | Action-adventure | | | |
| July 15 | Shantae: Risky's Revenge | WIN | | Platformer, Metroidvania | | | |
| July 16 | Miracle Fly | DROID | | Puzzle-platformer, Action-adventure | | | |
| July 21 | Freedom Planet | WIN, OSX, LIN | | Action, Platformer | | | |
| July 21 | Shadow Blade: Reload | WIN, OSX | | Platformer | | | |
| July 22 | Entwined | PSN, PSV | | Rhythm | | | |
| July 22 | Forza Motorsport 5 Racing Game of the Year Edition | XBO | | Racing | | | |
| July 22 | Oddworld: New 'n' Tasty! | PS4 | | Cinematic platformer | | | |
| July 22 | OlliOlli | WIN, OSX, LIN | | Sports | | | |
| July 22 | The Walking Dead: Season Two - Episode 4: Amid The Ruins | WIN, OSX, PSN, PSV | | Graphic adventure | | | |
| July 23 | Happy Wars | WIN | | Action, Tactical RPG | | | |
| July 23 | The Walking Dead: Season Two - Episode 4: Amid The Ruins | XB360 | | Graphic adventure | | | |
| July 23 | Traps n' Gemstones | iOS | | Platformer | | | |
| July 23 | Unrest | WIN, OSX, LIN | | RPG | | | |
| July 24 | Castle of Illusion Starring Mickey Mouse | OSX | | Platformer | | | |
| July 24 | Gods Will Be Watching | WIN | | | | | |
| July 24 | Modern Combat 5: Blackout | iOS, DROID | | FPS | | | |
| July 24 | Siesta Fiesta | 3DS | | | | | |
| July 24 | The Walking Dead: Season Two - Episode 4: Amid The Ruins | iOS | | Graphic adventure | | | |
| July 24 | Trine Enchanted Edition | WIN | | Puzzle-platformer, Action-adventure | | | |
| July 24 | Wooden Sen'SeY | WiiU | | | | | |
| July 24 | Nekodancer | WIN, OSX, LIN | | | | | |
| July 25 | Sharknado: The Video Game | iOS | | Endless runner | | | |
| July 27 | Lethal League | WIN | | Fighting | | | |
| July 28 | The Room | WIN | | Puzzle | | | |
| July 29 | Firefall | WIN | | MMO, FPS, TPS | | | |
| July 29 | Lego Ninjago: Nindroids | 3DS, PSV | | | | | |
| July 29 | Pure Pool | PS4, WIN | | Sports, Simulation | | | |
| July 29 | Rogue Legacy | PS4, PSN, PSV | | Platformer, Roguelike, Metroidvania | | | |
| July 29 | The Last of Us Remastered | PS4 | Remaster | Action-adventure, Survival horror | | | |
| July 29 | The Legend of Heroes: Trails in the Sky | WIN | | RPG | | | |
| July 29 | Treasures of Montezuma: Arena | PSV | | | | | |
| July 30 | AirMech Arena | XB360 | | MOBA | | | |
| July 30 | Thomas Was Alone | DROID | | Puzzle-platformer | | | |
| July 31 | Colin McRae Rally | WIN, OSX | | Racing | | | |
| July 31 | Crazy Taxi: City Rush | iOS | | Racing, Action | | | |
| July 31 | Kaptain Brawe: A Brawe New World | OUYA | | Adventure, Hidden object, Puzzle | | | |
| July 31 | Steel Empire | 3DS | | Shoot 'em up | | | |
| July 31 | Total War: Shogun 2 | OSX | | TBS, RTT | | | |
| August 1 | Eidolon | WIN, OSX | | Adventure, Survival | | | |
| August 5 | Killzone Shadow Fall Intercept | PS4 | | FPS | | | |
| August 5 | Mind: Path to Thalamus | WIN, OSX, LIN | | Graphic adventure | | | |
| August 5 | Metrico | PSV | | Puzzle-platformer | | | |
| August 5 | Road Not Taken | PS4 | | Roguelike, Puzzle | | | |
| August 5 | Sacred 3 | WIN, PS3, XB360 | | Hack and slash, Brawler | | | |
| August 5 | Table Top Racing | PSV | | Racing | | | |
| August 5 | Teenage Mutant Ninja Turtles | 3DS | | | | | |
| August 5 | The Swapper | PS3, PS4, PSV | | Puzzle-platformer, Metroidvania | | | |
| August 5 | Ultra Street Fighter IV | PS3, XB360 | | Fighting | | | |
| August 6 | Back to Bed | WIN | | | | | |
| August 6 | Crazy Taxi: City Rush | DROID | | Racing, Action | | | |
| August 6 | Rules! | iOS | | | | | |
| August 7 | Dragon Quest IV: Chapters of the Chosen | iOS | | RPG | | | |
| August 7 | Godus | iOS | | God game | | | |
| August 7 | Jett Tailfin | WiiU | | | | | |
| August 8 | Ultra Street Fighter IV | WIN | | Fighting | | | |
| August 8 | Five Nights at Freddy's | WIN | | Survival horror, PCA | | | |
| August 11 | Mini Metro | WIN, OSX, LIN | | Puzzle, Strategy | | | |
| August 12 | Akiba's Trip: Undead & Undressed | PSV, PS3 | | | | | |
| August 12 | Disgaea 4: A Promise Revisited | PSV | | Tactical RPG | | | |
| August 12 | Gravity Crash Ultra | PSV | | Shoot 'em up | | | |
| August 12 | Hohokum | PSN, PS4, PSV | | Art | | | |
| August 12 | My Singing Monsters | PSV | | | | | |
| August 12 | P.T. | PS4 | | | | | |
| August 12 | Phantom Breaker: Battle Grounds | PSV | | Fighting | | | |
| August 12 | Risen 3: Titan Lords | WIN, PS3, XB360 | | Action RPG | | | |
| August 12 | Surgeon Simulator: Anniversary Edition | PS4 | | Simulation | | | |
| August 13 | Phineas and Ferb: Quest for Cool Stuff | WiiU, Wii, 3DS, DS, XB360 | | Platformer | | | |
| August 14 | Pinball FX 2 | XBO | | Pinball | | | |
| August 14 | Surgeon Simulator | DROID | | Simulation | | | |
| August 14 | WWE SuperCard | DROID, iOS | | DCCG | | | |
| August 19 | CounterSpy | PS3, PS4, PSV | | Stealth | | | |
| August 19 | Crimsonland | PSV | | Shoot 'em up | | | |
| August 19 | Diablo III: Ultimate Evil Edition | PS3, PS4, XB360, XBO | | Action RPG, Hack and slash | | | |
| August 19 | Hotline Miami | PS4 | | Shoot 'em up | | | |
| August 19 | Kung Fu Rabbit | PS3 | | Platformer | | | |
| August 19 | Plants vs. Zombies: Garden Warfare | PS3, PS4 | | TPS, Tower defense | | | |
| August 19 | Sword Art Online: Hollow Fragment | PSV | | RPG | | | |
| August 19 | Sword Art Online: Infinity Moment | PSV | | RPG | | | |
| August 19 | Tales of Xillia 2 | PS3 | | RPG | | | |
| August 19 | The Golf Club | WIN, XBO | | Sports | | | |
| August 19 | The Last Tinker: City of Colors | PS4 | | Action-adventure | | | |
| August 21 | BlazBlue: Clone Phantasma | 3DS | | Fighting | | | |
| August 21 | Xtreme Sports | 3DS | | Sports | | | |
| August 25 | Super Time Force Ultra | WIN | | Action, Adventure, Shooter | | | |
| August 25 | Tetris Battle Fusion | OUYA | | | | | |
| August 26 | Hyperdimension Neptunia Re;Birth 1 | PSV | | RPG | | | |
| August 26 | Infamous: First Light | PS4 | | Action-adventure | | | |
| August 26 | Madden NFL 15 | PS3, PS4, XB360, XBO | | Sports | | | |
| August 26 | Metro Redux | PS4, XOne, WIN, OSX | | FPS, Survival horror | | | |
| August 26 | OlliOlli | PSN, PS3, PS4 | | Sports | | | |
| August 26 | The Golf Club | PS4 | | Sports | | | |
| August 26 | The Walking Dead: Season Two - Episode 5: No Going Back | PSN, WIN, OSX, PSV | | Graphic adventure | | | |
| August 26 | Under Defeat HD | XB360 | | | | | |
| August 27 | BioShock | iOS | | FPS | | | |
| August 27 | The Walking Dead: Season Two - Episode 5: No Going Back | XB360 | | Graphic adventure | | | |
| August 27 | Five Nights at Freddy's | DROID | | Survival horror, PCA | | | |
| August 28 | SteamWorld Dig | WiiU | | Platformer, Action-adventure, Metroidvania | | | |
| August 28 | The Walking Dead: Season Two - Episode 5: No Going Back | iOS | | Graphic adventure | | | |
| August 29 | Azure Striker Gunvolt | 3DS | | | | | |
| August 29 | Dedede's Drum Dash Deluxe | 3DS | | Platformer | | | |
| August 29 | Kirby Fighters Deluxe | 3DS | | Platformer | | | |
| August 29 | Mighty Gunvolt | 3DS | | | | | |
| August 29 | Professor Layton vs. Phoenix Wright: Ace Attorney | 3DS | | Adventure, Puzzle, Visual novel | | | |
| September 2 | Dance Central Spotlight | XBO | | Music, Rhythm | | | |
| September 2 | Danganronpa 2: Goodbye Despair | PSV | | Adventure, Visual novel | | | |
| September 2 | Deathmatch Village | PS3, PSV | | MOBA | | | |
| September 2 | Don't Starve: Giants Edition | PSV | | Survival | | | |
| September 2 | Joe Danger | PSV | | Racing, Platformer | | | |
| September 2 | The Sims 4 | WIN, OSX | | Simulation | | | |
| September 2 | Velocity 2X | PS4, PSV | | Shoot 'em up, Puzzle | | | |
| September 2 | Warframe | XBO | | Action RPG, TPS | | | |
| September 2 | Warriors Orochi 3 Ultimate | PS4, PS3, XBO, PSV | | Hack and slash | | | |
| September 4 | Angry Birds Stella | WP, iOS, DROID | | Puzzle | | | |
| September 4 | Ice Cream Surfer | WiiU | | | | | |
| September 4 | Mikey Boots | iOS | | Platformer | | | |
| September 4 | Cubemen 2 | WiiU | | | | | |
| September 4 | Minecraft | PS4 | | Sandbox, Survival | | | |
| September 4 | Tappingo 2 | 3DS | | | | | |
| September 4 | Valiant Hearts: The Great War | iOS | | Puzzle, Adventure | | | |
| September 5 | CounterSpy | DROID, iOS | | Stealth | | | |
| September 5 | Dead Rising 3 Apocalypse Edition | WIN | | Action-adventure, Survival horror | | | |
| September 5 | Minecraft | XBO | | Sandbox, Survival | | | |
| September 5 | Planetary Annihilation | WIN, OSX, LIN | | RTS | | | |
| September 9 | Destiny | PS3, PS4, XB360, XBO | | FPS | | | |
| September 9 | Hack 'n' Slash | WIN | | Action-adventure | | | |
| September 9 | NHL 15 | PS3, PS4, XB360, XBO | | Sports | | | |
| September 11 | Teslagrad | WiiU | | Puzzle-platformer | | | |
| September 11 | The Keep | 3DS | | RPG | | | |
| September 11 | Five Nights at Freddy's | iOS | | Survival horror, PCA | | | |
| September 11 | Spider-Man Unlimited | iOS | | Endless runner | | | |
| September 12 | Fable Anniversary | WIN | | Action RPG | | | |
| September 12 | Mega Man 7 | WiiU | | Action, Platformer | | | |
| September 12 | Terraria | WP | | Action-adventure, Sandbox | | | |
| September 13 | Shovel Knight | OSX | | Action, Platformer | | | |
| September 14 | Anomaly 2 | PS4 | | RTS, Tower defense | | | |
| September 15 | Hero of Many | WIN | | Action-adventure | | | |
| September 16 | ArcheAge | WIN | | MMO, RPG | | | |
| September 16 | Cooking Mama 5: Bon Appetit! | 3DS | | Simulation | | | |
| September 16 | Fairy Fencer F | PS3 | | RPG | | | |
| September 16 | Fibbage | PS3, PS4, XBO | | Party | Jackbox Games | Jackbox Games | |
| September 16 | Goat Simulator | iOS, DROID | | Action | | | |
| September 16 | KickBeat Special Edition | PS4, WiiU | | Music, Rhythm | | | |
| September 16 | Murasaki Baby | PSV | | Puzzle | | | |
| September 16 | Naruto Shippuden: Ultimate Ninja Storm Revolution | WIN, PS3, XB360 | | Fighting | | | |
| September 16 | Theatrhythm Final Fantasy: Curtain Call | 3DS | | Rhythm | | | |
| September 16 | Total War: Rome II | OSX | | TBS, RTT | | | |
| September 17 | Age of Empires: Castle Siege | WIN, WP | | MMO, Tower defense | | | |
| September 17 | Final Fantasy IV | WIN | | RPG | | | |
| September 17 | Plunder Pirates | iOS | | Strategy | | | |
| September 18 | Elminage Gothic | WIN | | 4X, TBS | | | |
| September 18 | Endless Legend | WIN | | RPG | | | |
| September 18 | Flockers | WIN, PS4, XBO | | Puzzle | | | |
| September 18 | Roundabout | WIN, OSX, LIN | | Racing | | | |
| September 19 | 6180 the moon | WIN | | | | | |
| September 19 | D4 | XBO | | Adventure | | | |
| September 19 | Tropico 5 | OSX, LIN | | CMS, Government sim | | | |
| September 19 | Wasteland 2 | WIN, OSX, LIN | | RPG | | | |
| September 23 | Ar Nosurge: Ode to an Unborn Star | PS3 | | RPG | | | |
| September 23 | Arcana Heart 3: LOVE MAX!!!!! | PS3, PSV | | Fighting | | | |
| September 23 | CastleStorm: Definitive Edition | PS4, XBO | | Tower defense | | | |
| September 23 | Counter-Strike Nexon: Zombies | WIN | | FPS | | | |
| September 23 | Defense Grid 2 | WIN, XBO, PS4 | | Tower defense | | | |
| September 23 | Disney Infinity 2.0: Marvel Super Heroes | PS3, PS4, WIN, WiiU, XB360, XBO, iOS | | Action-adventure, Sandbox | | | |
| September 23 | FIFA 15 | WIN, PS3, PS4, XB360, XBO, Wii, PSV, 3DS, DROID | | Sports | | | |
| September 23 | Frozen Synapse Prime | PSV | | TBT | | | |
| September 23 | Gauntlet | WIN | | Dungeon crawl | | | |
| September 23 | Slender: The Arrival | PSN | | Survival horror | | | |
| September 23 | Stronghold Crusader II | WIN | | RTS | | | |
| September 24 | Fenix Rage | WIN | | Platformer | | | |
| September 24 | Slender: The Arrival | XB360 | | Survival horror | | | |
| September 24 | Turbo Dismount | iOS | | Vehicle sim, Sandbox | | | |
| September 25 | Grid 2 Reloaded Edition | OSX | | Racing | | | |
| September 25 | Just Dance Now | iOS, DROID | | Music, Rhythm | | | |
| September 25 | Metal Gear Rising: Revengeance | OSX | | Action, Hack and slash | | | |
| September 25 | The Vanishing of Ethan Carter | WIN | | Adventure | | | |
| September 25 | Yu-Gi-Oh! ZEXAL World Duel Carnival | 3DS | | | | | |
| September 26 | Hyrule Warriors | WiiU | | Hack and slash | | | |
| September 26 | KickBeat Special Edition | XBO | | Music, Rhythm | | | |
| September 26 | Neverending Nightmares | WIN, OSX, LIN, OUYA | | Survival horror | | | |
| September 26 | Starpoint Gemini 2 | WIN | | Vehicular combat (spaceship), RPG | | | |
| September 28 | Massive Chalice | WIN, OSX, LIN | | TBS, TBT | | | |
| September 29 | Outland | WIN | | Platformer, Metroidvania | | | |
| September 29 | Starwhal: Just the Tip | WIN, OSX, LIN | | | | | |
| September 30 | Borderlands 2 | LIN | | Action RPG, FPS | | | |
| September 30 | Chariot | PS4 | | | | | |
| September 30 | Forza Horizon 2 | XBO, XB360 | | Racing | | | |
| September 30 | Futuridium EP Deluxe | PS4, PSV | | Shoot 'em up | | | |
| September 30 | Middle-earth: Shadow of Mordor | WIN, PS4, XBO | Original | Action-adventure | | | |
| September 30 | Natural Doctrine | PS3, PS4, PSV | | Tactical RPG | | | |
| September 30 | Persona 4 Arena Ultimax | PS3, XB360 | | Fighting | | | |
| September 30 | Pier Solar HD | WIN, OSX, LIN, OUYA, PSN, PS4 | | RPG | | | |
| September 30 | Ranko Tsukigime's Longest Day | PS3 | | | | | |
| September 30 | Second Chance Heroes | PS4 | | Action RPG, Hack and slash | | | |
| September 30 | Sherlock Holmes: Crimes & Punishments | WIN, PS3, PS4, XB360, XBO | | Adventure | | | |

=== October–December ===
| Release date | Title | Platform | Type | Genre | Developer | Publisher | Ref. |
|---|---|---|---|---|---|---|---|
| October 1 | Chariot | XBO | | | | | |
| October 2 | Run for Cheese | iOS, DROID | | | | | |
| October 3 | Super Smash Bros. for Nintendo 3DS | 3DS | | Fighting | | | |
| October 5 | Skylanders: Trap Team | 3DS, PS3, PS4, Wii, WiiU, XB360, XBO | | RPG, Platformer | | | |
| October 6 | Epic Mickey 2: The Power of Two | WIN | | Action-adventure, Platformer | | | |
| October 7 | Alien: Isolation | WIN, PS3, PS4, XB360, XBO | | Action-adventure, Stealth, Survival horror | | | |
| October 7 | Costume Quest 2 | WIN | | RPG | | | |
| October 7 | Divekick: Addition Edition + | PS4, XBO | | Fighting | | | |
| October 7 | Driveclub | PS4 | | Racing | | | |
| October 7 | Dust: An Elysian Tail | PS4 | | Action RPG, Hack and slash, Metroidvania | | | |
| October 7 | Jet Car Stunts | PS3, PSV | | Racing | | | |
| October 7 | NBA 2K15 | WIN, PS3, PS4, XB360, XBO | | Sports | | | |
| October 7 | Pix the Cat | PS4, PSV | | Snake, Puzzle | | | |
| October 7 | Project Spark | XBO, WIN | | Sandbox, Action-adventure | | | |
| October 7 | Spelunky | PS4 | | Platformer, Roguelike | | | |
| October 7 | Styx: Master of Shadows | WIN, PS4, XBO | | Stealth | | | |
| October 7 | Tenkai Knights: Brave Battle | 3DS | | Fighting | | | |
| October 7 | Vib-Ribbon | PSN, PSV | | Rhythm | | | |
| October 9 | Art of Balance | WiiU | | | | | |
| October 9 | Dragon Quest II | DROID, iOS | | RPG | | | |
| October 9 | Final Fantasy XIII | WIN | | RPG | | | |
| October 10 | Ryse: Son of Rome | WIN | | Action-adventure, Hack and slash | | | |
| October 11 | The Keep | 3DS | | RPG | | | |
| October 14 | Borderlands: The Pre-Sequel! | WIN, PS3, XB360 | | Action RPG, FPS | | | |
| October 14 | Defense Grid 2 | OSX, LIN | | Tower defense | | | |
| October 14 | In Space We Brawl | PS3, PS4 | | | | | |
| October 14 | Lone Survivor: The Director's Cut | PS4 | | Survival horror | | | |
| October 14 | Minecraft | PSV | | Sandbox, Survival | | | |
| October 14 | Pac-Man and the Ghostly Adventures 2 | 3DS, PS3, WiiU, XB360 | | Platformer | | | |
| October 14 | Peggle 2 | PS4 | | Puzzle | | | |
| October 14 | Petz Beach | 3DS | | Virtual pet | | | |
| October 14 | Petz Countryside | 3DS | | Virtual pet | | | |
| October 14 | Poptropica: Forgotten Islands | 3DS | | Educational, Adventure | | | |
| October 14 | Senran Kagura: Shinovi Versus | PSV | | | | | |
| October 14 | Sleeping Dogs: Definitive Edition | PS4, XBO, WIN | Remaster | Action-adventure | United Front Games | Square Enix | |
| October 14 | Tears to Tiara II: Heir of the Overlord | PS3 | | Tactical RPG, Visual novel, Eroge | | | |
| October 14 | The Evil Within | WIN, PS3, PS4, XB360, XBO | Original | Survival horror | | | |
| October 14 | The Walking Dead | PS4, XBO | | Graphic adventure | | | |
| October 15 | Angry Birds Transformers | iOS | | Shoot 'em up | | | |
| October 15 | Killer Instinct: Season 2 | XBO | | Fighting | | | |
| October 15 | Legend of Grimrock II | WIN | | Action RPG, Dungeon crawl | | | |
| October 16 | A City Sleeps | WIN | | Shoot 'em up | | | |
| October 16 | Paper Monster Recut | WiiU | | | | | |
| October 16 | Lone Survivor | WiiU | | Survival horror | | | |
| October 16 | Pyramids 2 | 3DS | | | | | |
| October 16 | Sentinels of the Multiverse: The Video Game | DROID, iOS | | | | | |
| October 16 | The Legend of Dark Witch | 3DS | | | | | |
| October 17 | F.E.A.R. Online | WIN | | FPS, Survival horror | | | |
| October 20 | République: Episode 3 | iOS | | Action-adventure, Stealth | | | |
| October 21 | Dreamfall Chapters: The Longest Journey | WIN, OSX, LIN, PS4 | | Adventure | | | |
| October 21 | Escape Goat 2 | PS4 | | Puzzle | | | |
| October 21 | F1 2014 | WIN, PS3, XB360 | | Racing | | | |
| October 21 | Fantasia: Music Evolved | XBO, XB360 | | Music, Rhythm | | | |
| October 21 | Jagged Alliance: Flashback | WIN, OSX, LIN | | Tactical RPG, TBT | | | |
| October 21 | Just Dance 2015 | PS3, PS4, Wii, WiiU, XB360, XBO | | Rhythm | | | |
| October 21 | Need for Speed Rivals: Complete Edition | PS3, PS4, WIN, XB360, XBO | | Racing | | | |
| October 21 | Race the Sun | PSN, PS4, PSV | | Endless runner | | | |
| October 21 | Samurai Warriors 4 | PS3, PS4, PSV | | Hack and slash | | | |
| October 21 | Screencheat | WIN | | FPS | | | |
| October 21 | Shadow Warrior | PS4, XBO | | FPS | | | |
| October 21 | The Legend of Korra | PSN, PS4, WIN | | Action, Brawler | | | |
| October 21 | The Voice: I Want You | PS3, Wii, XB360, WiiU | | | | | |
| October 21 | The Walking Dead: Season Two | PS4, XBO | | Graphic adventure, Interactive film | | | |
| October 22 | The Legend of Korra | XB360, XBO | | Action, Brawler | | | |
| October 23 | Stealth Inc 2: A Game of Clones | WiiU | | Platformer, Stealth | | | |
| October 23 | Shantae and the Pirate's Curse | 3DS | | Platformer, Metroidvania | | | |
| October 24 | Bayonetta 2 | WiiU | | Action, Hack and slash | | | |
| October 24 | Civilization: Beyond Earth | WIN, OSX, LIN | | TBS, 4X | | | |
| October 24 | Fantasy Life | 3DS | | RPG, Life sim | | | |
| October 24 | Majestic Nights | WIN, OSX, iOS, DROID | | | | | |
| October 24 | Pokémon Art Academy | 3DS | | Educational | | | |
| October 26 | How to Survive | XBO | | Action RPG, Survival horror, Survival | | | |
| October 27 | Dungeon of the Endless | WIN | | Roguelike, Tower defense | | | |
| October 27 | Spacebase DF-9 | WIN | | Simulation | | | |
| October 28 | Big Hero 6 | 3DS | | | | | |
| October 28 | Costume Quest 2 | PSN, PS4 | | RPG | | | |
| October 28 | Deadfall Adventures | PS3 | | FPS, Action-adventure | | | |
| October 28 | Freedom Wars | PSV | | Action RPG | | | |
| October 28 | Lords of the Fallen | WIN, PS4, XBO | | Action RPG | | | |
| October 28 | MX vs. ATV Supercross | WIN, XB360, PS3, OSX, LIN | | Racing | | | |
| October 28 | NBA Live 15 | PS4, XBO | | Sports | | | |
| October 28 | Poltergeist: A Pixelated Horror | PSV | | | | | |
| October 28 | Power Rangers Super Megaforce | 3DS | | | | | |
| October 28 | Skulls of the Shogun | OUYA | | TBT | | | |
| October 28 | Sunset Overdrive | XBO | Original | Action-adventure, TPS | | | |
| October 28 | The Legend of Korra: A New Era Begins | 3DS | | Tactical RPG | | | |
| October 28 | Teenage Mutant Ninja Turtles: Danger of the Ooze | PS3, XB360, 3DS | | | | | |
| October 28 | The Unfinished Swan | PS4, PSV | | Adventure | | | |
| October 28 | WWE 2K15 | PS3, XB360 | | Sports | | | |
| October 30 | Angry Birds Transformers | WP, DROID | | Shoot 'em up | | | |
| October 30 | Costume Quest 2 | OSX, LIN, WiiU, XB360, XBO | | RPG | | | |
| October 30 | Rock Zombie | WiiU | | | | | |
| October 30 | Run Sackboy! Run! | iOS | | Puzzle-platformer | | | |
| October 30 | Secret of Mana | DROID | | Action RPG | | | |
| October 30 | Transistor | OSX, LIN | | Action RPG, TBS | | | |
| October 30 | Woah Dave! | 3DS, iOS, WIN | | Platformer | | | |
| October 30 | Zombie Panic in Wonderland DX | 3DS | | TPS, Shooting gallery | | | |
| October 31 | Winx Club: Saving Alfea | 3DS | | | | | |
| November 3 | Depth | WIN | | FPS, Action | | | |
| November 4 | BioShock Infinite: The Complete Edition | XB360, PS3 | | FPS | | | |
| November 4 | Call of Duty: Advanced Warfare | WIN, PS3, PS4, XB360, XBO | Original | FPS | | | |
| November 4 | Frozen Synapse Prime | PS3 | | TBT | | | |
| November 4 | Harvest Moon: The Lost Valley | 3DS | | Farming, RPG | | | |
| November 4 | How to Survive | PS4 | | Action RPG, Survival horror, Survival | | | |
| November 4 | MotoGP 14 | WIN, PS3, XB360, PSV, PS4 | | Racing | | | |
| November 4 | Planes: Fire & Rescue | Wii, DS, WiiU, 3DS | | | | | |
| November 4 | Rocksmith 2014 | PS4, XBO | | Music | | | |
| November 4 | The Binding of Isaac: Rebirth | PS4, PSV, WIN, OSX, LIN | | Roguelike | | | |
| November 4 | The Hungry Horde | PSV | | | | | |
| November 4 | The Wolf Among Us | PS4, XBO | | Graphic adventure | | | |
| November 5 | A Bird Story | WIN, OSX, LIN | | Adventure, RPG | | | |
| November 6 | Pier Solar HD | WiiU | | RPG | | | |
| November 6 | The Sailor's Dream | iOS | | | | | |
| November 6 | The Swapper | WiiU | | Puzzle-platformer, Metroidvania | | | |
| November 7 | Civilization Revolution 2 | DROID | | TBS | | | |
| November 7 | Football Manager 2015 | WIN, OSX, LIN | | Sports, Business sim | | | |
| November 11 | Assassin's Creed Rogue | PS3, XB360 | | Action-adventure, Stealth | | | |
| November 11 | Assassin's Creed Unity | WIN, PS4, XBO | | Action-adventure, Stealth | | | |
| November 11 | Candy Crush Soda Saga | iOS, DROID | | Puzzle | | | |
| November 11 | Digimon All-Star Rumble | PS3, XB360 | | Fighting | | | |
| November 11 | Five Nights at Freddy's 2 | WIN | | Survival horror | | | |
| November 11 | Halo: The Master Chief Collection | XBO | Remaster + Compilation | FPS | | | |
| November 11 | Lego Batman 3: Beyond Gotham | WIN, PS3, PS4, WiiU, XB360, XBO, 3DS, PSV | | Action-adventure | | | |
| November 11 | Retro City Rampage DX | PS4 | | Action-adventure | | | |
| November 11 | Ring Run Circus | PSV | | | | | |
| November 11 | Senran Kagura: Bon Appétit! | PSV | | | | | |
| November 11 | Shape Up | XBO | | Fitness | | | |
| November 11 | Sonic Boom: Rise of Lyric | WiiU | | Action-adventure, Platformer | | | |
| November 11 | Sonic Boom: Shattered Crystal | 3DS | | Action-adventure, Platformer | | | |
| November 11 | Tales of Hearts R | PSV | | RPG | | | |
| November 11 | Terraria | PS4 | | Action-adventure, Sandbox | | | |
| November 11 | Tetris Ultimate | 3DS | | Puzzle | | | |
| November 11 | Toybox Turbos | WIN | | Racing | | | |
| November 11 | Tropico 5 | XB360 | | CMS, Government sim | | | |
| November 11 | Valkyria Chronicles | WIN | | Tactical RPG | | | |
| November 12 | Chariot | WIN | | Puzzle-platformer | | | |
| November 12 | Golfinity | iOS | | Sports | | | |
| November 12 | Turbo Dismount | DROID | | Vehicle sim, Sandbox | | | |
| November 13 | A World of Keflings | WiiU | | City builder | | | |
| November 13 | Five Nights at Freddy's 2 | DROID | | Survival horror | | | |
| November 13 | Picross e5 | 3DS | | | | | |
| November 13 | Pro Evolution Soccer 2015 | WIN, PS3, PS4, XB360, XBO | | Sports | | | |
| November 13 | Tengami | WiiU | | Adventure, Puzzle | | | |
| November 13 | World of Warcraft: Warlords of Draenor | WIN, OSX | | MMO, RPG | | | |
| November 13 | XCOM: Enemy Within | iOS, DROID | | TBT | | | |
| November 14 | Frozen Synapse Prime | WIN | | TBT | | | |
| November 14 | Pure Pool | XBO | | Sports, Simulation | | | |
| November 14 | Terraria | XBO | | Action-adventure, Sandbox | | | |
| November 14 | This War of Mine | WIN, OSX, LIN | | Survival | | | |
| November 14 | Toybox Turbos | PSN, XB360 | | Racing | | | |
| November 16 | Vainglory | iOS | | MOBA | | | |
| November 18 | Adventure Time: The Secret of the Nameless Kingdom | 3DS, PS3, PSV, WIN, XB360 | | Action-adventure, RPG | | | |
| November 18 | Company of Heroes 2 - Ardennes Assault | WIN | | RTS | | | |
| November 18 | Dragon Age: Inquisition | WIN, PS3, PS4, XB360, XBO | | Action RPG | | | |
| November 18 | Escape Dead Island | WIN, PS3, XB360 | | Adventure, Survival horror | | | |
| November 18 | Far Cry 4 | WIN, PS3, PS4, XB360, XBO | | FPS | | | |
| November 18 | Grand Theft Auto Online | PS4, XBO | Port | Action-adventure | Rockstar North | Rockstar Games | |
| November 18 | Grand Theft Auto V | PS4, XBO | Port | Action-adventure | Rockstar North | Rockstar Games | |
| November 18 | Hatsune Miku: Project DIVA F 2nd | PS3, PSV | | Rhythm | | | |
| November 18 | LittleBigPlanet 3 | PS3, PS4 | | Puzzle-platformer, Sandbox | | | |
| November 18 | Middle-earth: Shadow of Mordor | PS3, XB360 | Port | Action-adventure | | | |
| November 18 | Never Alone | WIN, PS4, XBO | | Puzzle-platformer | | | |
| November 18 | Rabbids Invasion: The Interactive TV Show | XB360, XBO, PS4 | | | | | |
| November 18 | Rollers of the Realm | PS4, PSV, WIN | | | | | |
| November 18 | Tiny Troopers: Joint Ops | PS4 | | Shoot 'em up (twin stick) | | | |
| November 18 | Watch Dogs | WiiU | Port | Action-adventure | | | |
| November 18 | WWE 2K15 | PS4, XBO | | Sports | | | |
| November 19 | The Jackbox Party Pack | PS3, PS4, XBO | | Party | Jackbox Games | Jackbox Games | |
| November 20 | Alphadia Genesis | WiiU | | | | | |
| November 20 | Crossy Road | iOS | | Endless runner | | | |
| November 20 | Five Nights at Freddy's 2 | iOS | | Survival horror | | | |
| November 20 | Shadows: Heretic Kingdoms | WIN | | RPG | | | |
| November 21 | Kinetic Void | WIN, OSX, LIN | | Sandbox, Vehicle sim (spaceship) | | | |
| November 21 | Pier Solar HD | XBO | | RPG | | | |
| November 21 | Pokémon Omega Ruby and Alpha Sapphire | 3DS | | Monster tamer | | | |
| November 21 | Super Smash Bros. for Wii U | WiiU | | Fighting | | | |
| November 21 | Thomas Was Alone | XBO | | Puzzle-platformer | | | |
| November 25 | Akiba's Trip: Undead & Undressed | PS4 | | Action, Brawler | | | |
| November 25 | Aqua Kitty DX | PS4, PSV | | | | | |
| November 25 | Geometry Wars 3: Dimensions | WIN, PSN, PS4, OSX, LIN | | Shoot 'em up | | | |
| November 25 | Haunted House: Cryptic Graves | WIN | | Survival horror | | | |
| November 25 | Persona Q: Shadow of the Labyrinth | 3DS | | RPG, Dungeon crawl | | | |
| November 25 | Penguins of Madagascar | 3DS, WiiU | | | | | |
| November 25 | Speakeasy | PS4 | | | | | |
| November 25 | Tales from the Borderlands - Episode 1: Zer0 Sum | WIN, PSN, PS4 | | Graphic adventure | | | |
| November 25 | The Pinball Arcade | XBO | | Pinball | | | |
| November 25 | Thomas Was Alone | PS4, WiiU | | Puzzle-platformer | | | |
| November 25 | Valiant Hearts: The Great War | DROID | | Puzzle, Adventure | | | |
| November 26 | Civilization: Beyond Earth | OSX | | TBS, 4X | | | |
| November 26 | Geometry Wars 3: Dimensions | XB360, XBO | | Shoot 'em up | | | |
| November 26 | The Jackbox Party Pack | WIN | | Party | Jackbox Games | Jackbox Games | |
| November 26 | Tales from the Borderlands - Episode 1: Zer0 Sum | XBO | | Graphic adventure | | | |
| November 27 | Oddworld: Stranger's Wrath | iOS | | FPS, TPS, Action-adventure | | | |
| November 27 | Proun+ | iOS | | | | | |
| November 27 | Godus | DROID | | God game | | | |
| November 28 | Emergency 5 | WIN | | | | | |
| December 2 | Fantasy Hero Unsigned Legacy | PSV | | | | | |
| December 2 | Final Horizon | PS4, PSV | | Tower defense | | | |
| December 2 | Game of Thrones - Episode 1: Iron From Ice | WIN, OSX, PS4 | | Graphic adventure, Interactive film | | | |
| December 2 | Kingdom Hearts HD 2.5 Remix | PS3 | | Action RPG | | | |
| December 2 | Monopoly Plus | PS4 | | Strategy, Digital tabletop | | | |
| December 2 | Secret Ponchos | PS4 | | Shoot 'em up | | | |
| December 2 | The Crew | WIN, PS4, XBO, XB360 | | Racing | | | |
| December 3 | Chivalry: Medieval Warfare | PS3, XB360 | | Hack and slash | | | |
| December 3 | Game of Thrones - Episode 1: Iron From Ice | XBO, XB360 | | Graphic adventure, Interactive film | | | |
| December 3 | I Am Bread | WIN | Early Access | | | | |
| December 3 | Tales from the Borderlands - Episode 1: Zer0 Sum | XB360 | | Graphic adventure | | | |
| December 3 | Tomb Raider II | iOS | | Action-adventure, Platformer | | | |
| December 4 | Dead State | WIN | | RPG, Survival horror | | | |
| December 4 | Dragon Quest III | DROID, iOS | | RPG | | | |
| December 4 | Game of Thrones - Episode 1: Iron From Ice | iOS | | Graphic adventure, Interactive film | | | |
| December 5 | Captain Toad: Treasure Tracker | WiiU | | Puzzle-platformer | | | |
| December 5 | Five Nights at Freddy's | WP | | Survival horror | | | |
| December 5 | Five Nights at Freddy's 2 | WP | | Survival horror | | | |
| December 5 | Limbo | XBO | | Puzzle-platformer | | | |
| December 5 | NES Remix Pack | WiiU | | Action | | | |
| December 5 | Ultimate NES Remix | 3DS | | Action | | | |
| December 5 | Threes | XBO | | Puzzle | | | |
| December 9 | Game of Thrones - Episode 1: Iron From Ice | PS3 | | Graphic adventure, Interactive film | | | |
| December 9 | Giana Sisters: Twisted Dreams - Director's Cut | PS4 | | Puzzle-platformer | | | |
| December 9 | Lara Croft and the Temple of Osiris | WIN, PS4, XBO | | Action-adventure | | | |
| December 9 | Phoenix Wright: Ace Attorney Trilogy | 3DS | | Adventure, Visual novel | | | |
| December 9 | Rock Boshers DX | PS4, PSV | | | | | |
| December 9 | Suikoden | PSN, PSV | | RPG | | | |
| December 9 | Suikoden II | PSN, PSV | | RPG | | | |
| December 10 | Elegy for a Dead World | WIN | | | | | |
| December 10 | Marvel Contest of Champions | DROID, iOS | | Fighting | | | |
| December 10 | Minecraft | WP | | Sandbox, Survival | | | |
| December 11 | BlazBlue: Continuum Shift Extend | WIN | | Fighting | | | |
| December 11 | Caller's Bane | WIN, OSX, DROID | | Deck building | | | |
| December 11 | Candy Crush Saga | WP | | Puzzle | | | |
| December 11 | Final Fantasy XIII-2 | WIN | | RPG | | | |
| December 11 | Hazumi | 3DS | | | | | |
| December 11 | Scrolls | WIN, OSX, DROID | | RPG | | | |
| December 11 | The Talos Principle | WIN, OSX, LIN | | Puzzle | | | |
| December 11 | Xeodrifter | 3DS | | Metroidvania | | | |
| December 12 | Giana Sisters: Twisted Dreams - Director's Cut | XBO | | Puzzle-platformer | | | |
| December 12 | The King of Fighters '98 Ultimate Match Final Edition | WIN | | Fighting | | | |
| December 12 | Metro 2033 Redux | LIN | | FPS, Survival horror | | | |
| December 12 | Metro: Last Light Redux | LIN | | FPS, Survival horror | | | |
| December 12 | Papers, Please | iOS | | Puzzle, Simulation | | | |
| December 16 | Elite: Dangerous | WIN | | Vehicle sim (spaceship) | | | |
| December 16 | Guilty Gear Xrd -SIGN- | PS3, PS4 | | Fighting | | | |
| December 16 | Hearthstone: Heroes of Warcraft | DROID | | DCCG | | | |
| December 16 | Loadout | PS4 | | TPS | | | |
| December 16 | Oddworld: Munch's Oddysee HD | PSV | | Platformer | | | |
| December 16 | SimCity BuildIt | iOS, DROID | | CMS, City builder | | | |
| December 16 | Tetris Ultimate | PS4 | | Puzzle | | | |
| December 17 | Brothers in Arms 3: Sons of War | iOS, DROID | | TPS, Action-adventure | | | |
| December 17 | Kalimba | XBO | | Puzzle-platformer | | | |
| December 18 | Civilization: Beyond Earth | LIN | | TBS, 4X | | | |
| December 18 | Grand Theft Auto: Chinatown Wars Mobile | DROID | | Action-adventure | | | |
| December 18 | Metal Gear Solid V: Ground Zeroes | WIN | | Action-adventure, Stealth | | | |
| December 18 | Plenty of Fishies | WiiU | | | | | |
| December 19 | Assetto Corsa | WIN | | Racing (sim) | | | |
| December 19 | Sportsfriends | WIN | | Party | | | |
| December 20 | Luftrausers | FOS | | Shoot 'em up | | | |
| December 21 | The Telltale Games Collection | XBO | | | | | |
| December 22 | Geometry Dash | WIN, OSX | | Platformer | | | |
| December 23 | Fieldrunners 2 | PSV | | Tower defense | | | |
| December 23 | Resogun | PS3, PSV | | Shoot 'em up | | | |
| December 23 | Switch Galaxy Ultra | PS4, PSV | | | | | |
| December 23 | Star Wars: Knights of the Old Republic | DROID | | RPG | | | |
| December 23 | Trine Enchanted Edition | PS4 | | Puzzle-platformer, Action-adventure | | | |
| December 25 | Duck Hunt | WiiU | | Light gun shooter, Sports | | | |
| December 25 | Mario Party Advance | WiiU | | Party | | | |
| December 25 | Shantae and the Pirate's Curse | WiiU | | Platformer, Metroidvania | | | |
| December 25 | Spy Chameleon | WiiU | | | | | |
| December 25 | Super Mario World: Super Mario Advance 2 | WiiU | | Platformer | | | |
