= Cross-platform play =

Computer gaming on multiple platforms

A Japanese print ad for the 2001 video game Capcom vs. SNK 2 that emphasizes the cross-platform play by depicting a PlayStation 2 user competing against a Dreamcast user. The tagline translates to "Fight on the net! Go beyond the hardware!"

In video games with online gaming functionality, cross-platform play, also called cross-compatible play or cross-play, describes the ability of players using different video game hardware to play with each other simultaneously. It is commonly applied to the ability for players using a game on a specific video game console to play alongside a player on a different hardware platform such as another console or a computer. A related concept is cross-save, in which the player's progress in a game is stored in separate servers, and can be continued in the game but on a different hardware platform.

Cross-play is related to but distinct from the notions of cross-platform development, cross-platform releases, cross-buy, and cross-platform save game cloud synchronisation.

Cross-platform play, while technically feasible with today's computer hardware, generally is impeded by two factors. One factor is the difference in control schemes between personal computers and consoles, with the keyboard-and-mouse controls typically giving computer players an advantage that cannot be easily remedied. The second factor relates to the closed online services used on consoles that are designed to provide a safe and consistent environment for its players that require the businesses' cooperation to open up for cross-platform play. Up through September 2018, Sony Interactive Entertainment had restricted PlayStation 4 cross-platform play with other consoles, creating a rift between players of popular games like Rocket League and Fortnite Battle Royale. In September 2018, Sony changed their stance, and had opened up beta-testing for Fortnite cross-platform play. Sony officially stated it will allow any developers to support cross-platform play in October 2019.

== Background ==
Prior to the seventh generation of video game consoles, video games were typically developed for a single console with only a few games receiving cross-platform releases across multiple consoles. This was due to the unique processing architecture of each console, making development for each a closed ecosystem and requiring additional effort to port to other systems. With the seventh generation of consoles, which saw console systems use similar processor hardware as personal computers, cross-platform development for both consoles and personal computers became much easier to achieve using standard software libraries, game engines, and scripting languages that isolate platform-specific details from the specific elements for the game itself. Such tools enabled games to be released simultaneously for multiple platforms.

With the availability of the Internet, games have included online multiplayer components, allowing two or more users to play simultaneously on different computer systems. Games released for a platform may be able to take advantage of platform-specific networking libraries to accomplish this, such as the Winsock layer for Microsoft Windows. These games would not be able to be played cross-platform with other versions released on other systems. Instead, most games with online components and developed for multiple platforms generally use standard TCP/IP-type functions for communication between players' clients, or between a client and a game server, nullifying the intrinsic differences between hardware platforms.

There are some practical limitations for cross-platform play. In games where the player's computer or console acts as the server, the hardware capabilities may place limits on the number of players that that server can host, and thus preventing cross-platform play. Hardware also plays an issue in considering how much the player can customize the game on a computer to run at a high framerate, while console versions are fixed to run at the optimal experience on the set hardware configuration.

The most common limitation for supporting cross-platform play from a developer's stance is the difference in control schemes between consoles and computers. Computers with keyboard and mouse controls on personal computers are generally considered to have a significant advantage in games that require aiming, such as first-person shooters, over analog controllers for consoles. Console games are then subsequently developed with features such as aim assist to make up for the lack of precision controls. In 2010, Rahul Sood, the president of Voodoo PC, stated that Microsoft had terminated cross-platform play between Xbox 360 and computer players for an upcoming game claiming that even skilled console players "got destroyed every time" in matches against computer players of mediocre skill due to the difference between controller and keyboard-and-mouse controls, and thus would be seen as an embarrassment to the Xbox 360. Microsoft's Senior Director of Computer and Mobile Gaming Kevin Unangst countered this point, stating that Microsoft's internal testing found that much of the issues related to control scheme difference can be mitigated through a game's design and balance. Blizzard Entertainment implemented cross-platform play in its game Overwatch for all supported consoles and on personal computers, but due to the advantage keyboard-mouse players have over controllers, which greatly affects performance in the fast-paced game, they kept the game's competitive play mode segregated into console and computer player pools. Cliff Bleszinski believed that cross-platform play for his game LawBreakers was a "pipe dream", as he anticipated that by placing tools such as aim assist to help console players match computer players, computer players would be upset at the handicap this introduced, and the player base would react negatively towards this. Following wider adoption of cross-platform play in many mainstream titles starting around 2020, the issues of balancing the game with the use of aim assist in first-person shooters, where the game automatically locks onto targets for those using controllers, became of concern as a game with aggressive aim assist could lead to poor balance between cross-platform players.

Providing cross-platform play is seen as a means to keep a game's player base large even several months out after a game's release.

== History ==
Generally, cross-platform play between personal computers of different operating systems is readily enabled using standard communication protocols, and only requires the game to be appropriately ported to these other systems; the computer platform is considered to be very open due to this. Though digital online services that operate on the computer have become popular since around 2010, these systems typically remain open, providing the developer with tools to take advantage of cross-platform play. For example, Valve's online game service, Steam was initially built for Windows computers, but in 2010 expanded to OS X systems, and in 2013 to Linux (including Valve's customized SteamOS). The Steamworks API offered to developers through the service enables cross-platform play to uses on these different operating systems while taking advantage of the friends, communication, and matchmaking features offered by Steam. With the introduction of the Epic Games Store, Epic Games released its own set of backend tools to support networking for games released on the store. Though initially games on both the Epic Games and Steam were not compatible, Epic developed and released a free API for supporting cross-platform play for games released on both storefronts in June 2022, with plans to expand this for mobile and console games.

=== Relating to consoles ===
Prior to 2006, hardware consoles typically lacked built-in Internet connections, often requiring special hardware to be able to connect to the Internet. This enabled some games to be deployed as cross-platform titles. Early attempts at cross-platform play include the 1998 Sega Dreamcast which included a built-in modem; Microsoft worked with Sega to provide a version of Windows CE to developers to make cross-platform games between Dreamcast and Windows players for games such as 4x4 Evo, Maximum Pool, Quake 3 Arena and Phantasy Star Online. Sony would launch the PlayStation 2 in 2000, which feature support for online play via an external modem. On September 13, 2001, Capcom vs. SNK 2 was released for the Dreamcast and PlayStation 2 in Japan. The Japanese versions of the game allow players from both platforms to compete against each other online via KDDI's Multi-Matching service, making it the first game title to allow cross-play between game consoles from competing manufacturers. Square Enix would introduce online play between PlayStation 2 and Windows users for Final Fantasy XI in 2002.

The introduction of Internet-ready game consoles, such as Sony's PlayStation 3 and Microsoft's Xbox, brought online services that aid in securely managing the player's credentials, digital store purchases, friend lists, messaging and other social features, and online matchmaking for multiplayer games. Though providing benefits to the player, these online services also aid the managing company to maintain a consistent and attractive experience for its users, assuring games, updates, and other content meet both desirable quality and content restrictions as to draw new players to these consoles. Historically, cross-platform play with consoles has been very limited as a result of these services, and the ability to have console games with cross-platform play is considered to be a "holy grail" within the video game sector.

One technical challenge that faces console-based cross-platform play is the network communication between platforms, managing the different protocols used by each service. However, the technical limitations can be overcome, with at least three developers stating they could enable cross-platform play within a day once they were allowed to do so. A "configuration issue" briefly allowed computer, PlayStation 4, and Xbox One players to play alongside each other in the online cooperative game Fortnite in mid-September 2017. This had not been an expected feature of the game, as cited by the game's current specifications. While Epic Games corrected the configuration and stated this was a mistake, the brief situations demonstrated that technical barriers to cross-platform play can be met. Later in March 2018, Epic announced plans to take the spinoff title, Fortnite Battle Royale for Windows, PlayStation 4, Xbox One, and mobile devices, with cross-platform play enabled between computer, PlayStation 4 and mobile, and computer, Xbox One, Nintendo Switch, and mobile.

Once these technical challenges can be overcome, the primarily limiting factor for cross-platform play has been the terms of service and acceptable use policy that developers and players must abide by when using the consoles' online services. Sony's Shuhei Yoshida, in discussing the possibility of cross-platform play between PlayStation and Xbox platforms, noted that "the technical aspect could be the easiest" to overcome compared to policy and business-related issues. Some online services have restrictions on age-related content which prevent certain games from using cross-platform play or to disable certain features to allow it; Dave Hagewood, a lead developer for Rocket League, noted that they had to launch their game, which supports cross-platform play between Windows and the PlayStation 4 versions, without the ability for players to communicate across systems due to content regulations Sony has in place; they were able to later patch in filters to allow for this communications under Sony's service. Valve had to drop PlayStation 3 and computer cross-platform play from its 2012 Counter-Strike: Global Offensive just before launch as they wanted the ability to patch the game on a frequent basis, which would be limited by Sony's certification process on the PlayStation system; they had similarly tried to bring Steamworks to the Xbox 360 for this game, but also found Microsoft's certification policies to be too restrictive for frequent updates.

For decades, console manufacturers have worked proactively to protect the exclusivity of a game on their system from other console competitors, to which cross-platform play can be seen as a threat. Some journalists have postulated that cross-platform play had been restricted by console makers as to assure players remain with their platform for future games. Kyle Orland for Ars Technica said that if a player wants to continue playing new games with friends, the lack of cross-platform play required them to continue to purchase the new games for that console platform, creating "powerful network effects". Alex Perry of Mic similarly noted that lack of cross-platform play can lead a player to try to push and influence their friends to buy the same console so they can play together, boosting sales for that console manufacturer.

==== Microsoft ====
Microsoft has explored cross-platform play between their Xbox consoles and players on Windows machines uses services under its purview. Microsoft developed the Games for Windows – Live interface in part to work with the Xbox Live services so that cross-platform play could be released, with the first such title released being Shadowrun (2007). Microsoft has put further effort with cross-platform play features through the introduction of the Xbox One and the Windows 10 operating system for personal computers. Announced during the March 2015 Game Developers Conference, Windows 10 integrates Xbox Live services directly and includes technology to support the Cross-Play feature that enables, among other features, the ability for users on Xbox One and Windows 10 consoles to play together. Microsoft announced games that would support cross-platform play including Gigantic and Fable Legends. Issues related to the different control schemes remain a limiting factor; Microsoft's head of publishing Shannon Loftis said that some games, like racing games, do not readily translate well to cross-platform titles due to control system differences. One such title is the Killer Instinct, originally released for Xbox One in 2013, and with a Windows 10 version released in 2016 that supports cross-platform play. At the Electronic Entertainment Expo 2016, Microsoft announced the Xbox Play Anywhere program for upcoming games that allow users to purchase the title for either Xbox One or Windows 10 and be able to play it on the other platform without having to repurchase the title for that system. This also further enhances the integration of Xbox Live services on Windows 10, allowing for more titles to support cross-platform play. Initial titles released under this program include Gears of War 4 and Forza Horizon 3.

In March 2016, Microsoft announced a new initiative to open up the Xbox One to cross-platform play to Windows users without the use of Xbox Live services. The first game under this initiative was Rocket League, allowed users using the Steam-enabled version to play with those on Xbox Live, starting in May 2016, Microsoft extended this invitation to any other online service, including Steam and the Nintendo Switch, with Microsoft's vice president of the Xbox division Mike Ybarra stating "It's more about gamer choice, more about making an IP on our platform last longer. I don't care about where they play, I just want people to have fun playing games because that's just better for the industry."

Separately, Microsoft allows for cross-platform play between the Xbox 360 and Xbox One for Xbox 360 games that supported online play that were made to be backwards compatible on the Xbox One.

==== Nintendo ====
Nintendo's consoles have generally not supported cross-platform play as they were considered to be a "closed" platform, though some Nintendo games included cross-play between its own consoles, for example Final Fantasy Crystal Chronicles: Echoes of Time on Wii and DS, Dragon Quest X for Wii, Wii U, Windows, Android, iOS and 3DS, Pure Chess on Wii U and 3DS, and Monster Hunter 3 Ultimate and Monster Hunter Generations Ultimate, which feature cross-platform multiplayer between 3DS/Wii U and 3DS/Switch, respectively. Super Smash Bros. for Nintendo 3DS and Wii U was a particularly high-profile example of functionality akin to cross-platform play between the 3DS and Wii U versions. Though the same full gameplay instance did not explicitly run in tandem on both systems simultaneously due to the two versions' differing stage lists, 3DS version owners could use their Nintendo 3DS system as a controller and auxiliary score display for matches on the Wii U version and players could use their acquired equipment and saved loadouts from either version on the other. Nintendo has more recently sought to gain favor with independent developers, and as part of this, have allowed some titles to include cross-platform play support, with the first being Pure Chess and Knytt Underground in 2013, which support cross-platform play between the Wii U, Nintendo 3DS, and mobile systems.

With the Nintendo Switch console released in March 2017, Nintendo has adopted a more open route for developers using existing toolsets and game engines, making it easier for them to support cross-platform play. During the Electronic Entertainment Expo 2017 in June of that year, Nintendo announced that it would support cross-platform play between PC and Xbox One versions of both Rocket League and Minecraft on the Switch. According to Nintendo of America's corporate communications director Charlie Scibetta, the company is "trying to be more flexible and bring more people in" by allowing for cross-platform play, particularly in cases where the developer wants to pursue it.

==== Sony ====
In April 2011, Valve worked with Sony to create a version of Steam to operate on the PlayStation 3 that enabled cross-platform play for its games, including Portal 2, with computer users. With the introduction of the PlayStation 4, Sony provided features that enabled cross-platform play between it, the PlayStation 3, and the PlayStation Vita, with the first title to support this being Helldivers. In 2013, Final Fantasy XIV, a replacement for the failed 2010 release, was released for Windows and PlayStation 3, with subsequent releases for PlayStation 4, macOS, PlayStation 5, and Xbox Series X and S, with a planned release for Nintendo Switch 2. The game also features full cross-platform progression and play between all supported platforms.

While Sony has continued to offer cross-platform play between the PlayStation 4 and computer systems, the company was initially reluctant to allow cross-play with other consoles for the PS4's first five years of availability. Following Microsoft's plan for Rocket League, the company invited other online networks to participate as well. Sony responded by saying they are open to having discussions for cross-platform play in light of this invitation. Yoshida noted that while connecting the PlayStation networks to the computer is straightforward given the openness of the computer's platform, connection to the Xbox platform requires them to think about the nature of connecting two closed systems. Yoshida considered that the primary challenge would be policy and business-related rather than any technical challenge, but are open to working out cross-platform play on a per-game basis. At least three developers, Psyonix (Rocket League), CD Projekt (Gwent: The Witcher Card Game), and Studio Wildcard (Ark: Survival Evolved) stated they have made all the technical requirements to enable cross-platform play between the Xbox One and PlayStation 4, and would be able to activate these within mere hours of receiving formal authorisation from Sony. Bethesda Game Studios' Todd Howard said that, while they wanted to have cross-platform play for their upcoming online title, Fallout 76, they cannot offer it as "Sony is not as helpful as everyone would like". Further, Bethesda stated they will only plan to release The Elder Scrolls: Legends card game for console platforms that fully support cross-platform play with computers and mobile devices.

Further concerns about Sony's reluctance to participate with other consoles came after the E3 2017 announcements regarding cross-platform play with Rocket League and Minecraft. PlayStation global marketing head Jim Ryan said that while they are "open to conversations with any developer or publisher who wants to talk about it", their decision to not participate for these games was "a commercial discussion between ourselves and other stakeholders". Ryan cited one is being that Sony needed to "be mindful of our responsibility to our install base", consider the number of younger players using their services, and the inability to control content that might come from other platforms that do not have content restrictions. Microsoft has said that it has been in discussions with Sony to help bring them into cross-platform play compatibility, though disagreed with Sony's safety concerns as Microsoft says it has taken similar measures as Sony to assure features like strong parental controls were present on its Xbox Live service. Microsoft's Phil Spencer said in an October 2017 interview that Microsoft and Sony have been in frequent talks for allowing cross-platform play, but Sony remains very cautious; he did not consider it a "lost cause" but did state of Sony, "I think some of the fundamental reasons and certain scenarios, they're not really going away".

Documents unveiled in the Epic Games v. Apple case in 2021 revealed that Epic Games had approached Sony in the months prior to E3 2018 in June to encourage them to support cross-platform play for Fortnite Battle Royale, with Epic proposing a solution that would make it appear as a win-win solution for both companies when they announced it at E3; Epic gaining the player base on the PlayStation, and Sony having potentially one of the biggest gaming hits on its platform. Sony had rejected this as they stated in reply to Epic, "many companies are exploring this idea and not a single one can explain how cross-console play improves the PlayStation business".

With the release of Fortnite Battle Royale on the Nintendo Switch during E3 2018, Sony's approach to cross-platform play drew further criticism. The game supports cross-platform play across personal computer, Xbox One, and mobile devices, with players normally able to use a single Epic Games account, which may be linked to a platform-specific account, to carry over progress and purchases between any of those platforms; the Nintendo Switch version also works in this same manner. However, players found that if their Epic Games account was tied to a PlayStation Network account, they could not use that profile on the Switch or other versions of the game, requiring them to either create a new Epic account, or unlinking their PlayStation Network account from their Epic account which completely resets the player's progress. The PlayStation 4 version also remained limited in only allowing its players to cross-platform play with personal computer and mobile devices and not the Switch or Xbox One versions. Nintendo affirmed that this was a decision made by Sony, as they otherwise would want to be open to all forms of cross-platform play. Many gamers and even video game journalists accused Sony of forcing the restrictions to prevent PlayStation 4 players from playing on other platforms. Sony stated in response that they are still open to what players wanted, and that "With... more than 80 million monthly active users on PlayStation Network, we've built a huge community of gamers who can play together on Fortnite and all online titles". Journalists took Sony's reaction as a message from Sony that providing cross-platform play on other consoles would be a threat to the market dominance of the PlayStation 4, which, at the time, has the current largest number of users compared to Xbox One or Nintendo Switch. John Smedley, a former president of Sony Online Entertainment (now Daybreak Game Company), stated that during his time with Sony, the reason the executives gave him for rejecting cross-platform play support was simply a financial motive, claiming, "they didn't like someone buying something on an Xbox and it being used on a Playstation". Sony's stocks fell approximately 2% in the days after this event, largely due to outrage from the large Fortnite player base.

In late June 2018, Sony's Shawn Layden told Eurogamer that the company is evaluating their stance on cross-platform play following the Fortnite issues. Layden said: "We're hearing it. We're looking at a lot of the possibilities. You can imagine that the circumstances around that affect a lot more than just one game. I'm confident we'll get to a solution which will be understood and accepted by our gaming community, while at the same time supporting our business." Yoshida reiterated that their decision to not allow for cross-play is to maintain the quality of the PlayStation user experience, stating "On cross-platform, our way of thinking is always that PlayStation is the best place to play. Fortnite, I believe, partnered with PlayStation 4 is the best experience for users, that's our belief."

A few months later, on September 26, 2018, Sony announced it would allow cross-platform play on the PlayStation 4 "for select third party content", beginning with Fortnite that day. Sony stated that the decision to allow cross-platform play was "a major policy change" and that their goal "remains to take a more open stance with cross-platform support that's aligned with our mission to deliver the best consumer experience". Layden, speaking on a podcast after this change was announced, knew that cross-platform play was a high demand by PlayStation 4 players, but described cross-platform play as a "very multi-dimensional kind of attribute or feature" that required Sony to look at how to implement this from a technical, business, and customer service point-of-view. Layden did state that it took longer to get to this point than he would have liked in order to clear these requirements. However, as revealed in Epic's trial with Apple, Sony still required Epic to pay additional royalty fees for this feature for Fortnite as to "offset the reduction in revenue" Sony believed would occur with cross-platform play would incur.

With their success at achieving cross-platform play support through all seven major platforms (Windows, macOS, iOS, Android, PlayStation, Xbox, and Nintendo Switch), Epic offered its cross-platform development support tools for free. Rocket League soon followed, with a beta cross-platform play option added to all versions in January 2019. Dauntless was released in an early access form in May 2019 for PlayStation 4 and Xbox One, joining the existing Windows version, and is the first game to launch with cross-platform play support across Windows, Xbox One, and the PlayStation 4.

According to Sony Interactive Entertainment CEO Jim Ryan in an interview with Wired, Sony has moved out of its beta stage for cross-platform play, and has opened it up to any developer that can support it starting in October 2019. In a 2021 interview with Axios, Ryan stated that for Sony, "We support and encourage cross-play".

==== From 2020 onward ====
In May 2020, Epic Games released a free SDK, its Epic Online Services, that allow developers to take advantage of its prior work in cross-platform play to support matchmaking, friends list, achievements, and other features in their games, supporting personal computers, PlayStation 4, Xbox One, Nintendo Switch, iOS and Android systems.

=== Relating to mobile devices ===
In general, games on mobile devices, though using iOS, Android, or Windows Mobile operating systems, do not have cross-platform play support. Mobile games are developed with recognition of connection speed limitations of cellular networks, and thus most multiplayer games are often turn-based strategy games rather than real-time action games. Many multiplayer games for mobile devices are asynchronous, where players individually complete turns or actions, these actions sent to central services and pushed out to the other players that may be impacted by those actions.

There are mobile games that do feature synchronous cross-platform play, typically using centralized services to normalize out platform choices. A common example is Hearthstone which enables mobile players to challenge players on any other platform that the game has been released on, including computers. Microsoft introduced server-side Realms in June 2016 to enable Minecraft players on Windows, iOS, and Android devices to play together, with Xbox One set to be included in 2017 and eventually support for virtual reality hardware. Minecraft's "Bedrock" edition unifies play across Windows 10, mobile, Xbox One, and Nintendo Switch versions, with PlayStation 4 cross-platform play added in December 2019, while Fortnite Battle Royale mobile versions were built with cross-platform play with computers and consoles.

The forementioned Epic Online Services SDK allows developers to easily integrate cross-platform play into mobile clients using Epic's established backend technology.

== See also ==
- List of video games that support cross-platform play
- Cross-platform software
