= Chess Ultra =

2017 video game

- Developer: Ripstone
- Publisher: Ripstone
- Engine: Unreal Engine 4
- Platforms: PlayStation 4, Microsoft Windows, Xbox One, Switch
- Release: PlayStation 4, Microsoft Windows, Xbox One; 21 June 2017; Nintendo Switch; 2 November 2017
- Genre: Computer chess
- Modes: Single-player, multiplayer

Chess Ultra is a chess video game developed and published by Ripstone for the PlayStation 4, Windows, and Xbox One in June 2017. A Switch port was released a few months later. It is the second chess game by Ripstone after Pure Chess (2012). Chess Ultra is the first in-house developed game by Ripstone.

== Gameplay ==
The game features four different graphical locations (fireplace room, living room, museum, dark cave) and four chess piece sets. In the tutorial mode, there are basic lessons for beginners, 80 checkmate challenges for advanced players, and for the most experienced players there is a mode where the player has to recreate historic games by playing the closing moves. The multiplayer supports either local or online play. The online multiplayer supports cross-platform play (except the PS4 version). In the portable mode in the Switch version, local multiplayer can be played by placing the console flat on the table to simulate a chessboard. The computer AI has ten difficulty settings. The game calculates the player's Elo rating when playing against the AI or other players online. The PlayStation 4 version has a PlayStation VR mode.

== Reception ==
Reception

Review scores
Publication	Score
Nintendo Life	8/10 (Switch)
Nintendo World Report	8.5/10 (Switch)
Digitally Downloaded	4.5/5 (PS4, Switch)
PlanetSwitch.de	4/5 (Switch)
Windows Central	4/5 (Xbox One)

Chess Ultra received generally positive reviews from critics. Windows Central liked the tutorials and cross-platform multiplayer but disliked the matchmaking system. Digitally Downloaded thought the game is an improvement from Pure Chess in every way. They also liked the table mode in the Switch version. Nintendo Life said the game is "[...] a polished and well constructed title. It falls short of true excellence due to controller quirks in local multiplayer and a few missing conveniences in online play, such as a notification system or means by which to communicate more directly." Nintendo World Report liked how accessible the game is and called it "outstanding". PlanetSwitch.de said that despite a few technical inconsistencies, it's a great chess for on the go.
