= Pure Pool =

2014 British pool simulation video game

- Developer: VooFoo Studios
- Publishers: Ripstone; Play It
- Engine: Proprietary
- Platforms: PlayStation 4 Microsoft Windows; Xbox One; Nintendo Switch
- Release: PlayStation 4: NA: 29 July 2014; EU: 30 July 2014; Windows: WW: 30 July 2014; Xbox One; 14 November 2014; Nintendo Switch; 17 November 2020
- Genre: Sports simulation (cue sports)
- Modes: Single-player, multiplayer

Pure Pool is a pool video game by British developer VooFoo Studios in association with Ripstone Games for the PlayStation 4 and PC platforms. It was released on the PlayStation Store in North America on 29 July 2014 and Europe on 30 July 2014, with a physical edition of the PS4 version also being published by System 3 under their Play It label. The Microsoft Windows version was released worldwide via Steam on 30 July 2014. An Xbox One version was later released via the ID@Xbox self-publishing initiative on 14 November 2014. The game was released for the Nintendo Switch on November 17, 2020. A sequel, Pure Pool Pro, was announced in April 2025 and released in February 2026 for PlayStation 5, Xbox Series X and S, Steam, and Epic Games Store.

== Description ==
The game features standard cue sports game types in addition to a game-specific mode called Accumulator. In career mode the game offers 40 hours of gameplay. The Official Sound Track (OST) of the game was composed by Etch Music, produced, recorded and mixed by Trevor Gibson at Circle (Recording) Studios in England, mastered by Zac at Zikis Mastering, was released by Supersaurus Records and is published by Integrity Publishing.

== Development ==
Pure Pool was developed by VooFoo Studios in association with Ripstone Games. The teams collaborated on Pure Chess. The game builds on the team's previous title Hustle Kings, most noteworthy being the ball physics and the graphics.
