= Toybox Turbos =

2014 video game

- Developer: Codemasters
- Publisher: Codemasters Racing
- Composer: Mark Knight
- Platforms: Windows; PlayStation 3; Xbox 360
- Release: Windows; 11 November 2014; PlayStation 3: PAL: 12 November 2014; NA: 14 November 2014; Xbox 360; 14 November 2014
- Genre: Racing
- Modes: Single-player, multiplayer

Toybox Turbos is a racing video game developed and published by Codemasters. It was released in November 2014.

== Gameplay ==
Toybox Turbos is a racing video game with gameplay similar to the Micro Machines video game series. The game features 18 circuits and 35 vehicles. The game supports local and online multiplayer.

== Reception ==
Reception

Aggregate score
Aggregator	Score
Metacritic	(PS3) 78/100 (PC) 69/100

Review scores
Publication	Score
4Players	(PC) 67%
Eurogamer	(PC) 7/10
GamesRadar+	(PS3) 4/5
GamesTM	(PC) 6/10
MeriStation	7/10
PlayStation Official Magazine – UK	(PS3) 8/10
Official Xbox Magazine (UK)	(X360) 6/10
Retro Gamer	(PC) 72%
Metro	(X360) 7/10

The PlayStation 3 version received "generally favorable reviews", while the PC version received "mixed or average reviews", according to the review aggregation website Metacritic.

GamesRadar+ said of the PS3 version, "There is something fundamentally fun about racing tiny cars across a breakfast table and pushing your best mate off it onto the floor...[it] offers immediate multiplayer fun thanks to its mix of racing, weapons and forgiving handling...[but] the single-player mode is not as entertaining."

Eurogamer said that the "handling is appropriately chunky, with enough bounce to be fun, but enough traction that you don't feel out of control...the tracks and race types certainly don't offer enough variation that the decision to favour speed over handling, or vice versa, has any real tactical merit...[but] as a budget-priced reminder of simpler times, Toybox Turbos does everything it needed to, but sadly not much more."
