= Table Tennis Touch =

2014 video game

- Developer: Yakuto
- Platforms: iOS, Android
- Release: iOS; May 15, 2014; Android; March 11, 2015
- Genre: Table tennis

Table Tennis Touch is a table tennis video game developed by British indie studio Yakuto. It was originally released for iOS on May 15, 2014. An Android release followed on March 11, 2015.

== Reception ==
Reception

Aggregate score
Aggregator	Score
Metacritic	92/100

The game has a score of 92 out of 100 on Metacritic, based on 5 critic reviews.

AppSpy wrote "Table Tennis Touch offers a fantastic simulation of the sport, but you will have to work if you want to reap rewards." Pocket Gamer wrote "A wonderfully well put together table tennis sim that deserves to be played by as many people as possible." 148Apps wrote "For fans and non-fans of ping pong alike, this is fun - plain and simple." Grab It Indie Games Magazine said "Table Touch Tennis mixes sports-sim realism with arcade escapism and stunning visuals to create a near-perfect storm of challenge and fun. Yakuto’s love for the sport is obvious and it results in an accessible yet deep game that even has a sense of humour." Arcade Sushi said "Table Tennis Touch manages to not only capture the fun of one of America’s most enduring pastimes, but it does so in a way that makes full use of video games as a medium, allowing for new types of experiences while keeping the core fun of the game intact."
