= Turbo Dismount =

2014 video game

- App icon
- Developer: Secret Exit Ltd.
- Publisher: Secret Exit Ltd.
- Designers: Jani Kahrama; Jouni Tuovinen; Niko Stenberg; Taina Myöhänen
- Engine: Unity
- Platforms: iOS; Android (No longer available on Google Play); Windows macOS
- Release: Windows, macOS; May 21, 2014 (Note: Was available in early access in January 2014.); iOS; September 24, 2014; Android; November 12, 2014
- Genres: Action, vehicle simulator
- Mode: Single-player

Turbo Dismount is a 2014 vehicle simulator video game developed and published by Finnish developer Secret Exit Ltd. for iOS, Android, macOS and Microsoft Windows. The game was first unveiled at GDC 2013 and was released in early access the following year in 2014, and remained in early access until fully releasing on Steam on May 21, 2014. Turbo is the latest in the Dismount series and serves as a follow-up to Stair Dismount, developed under their original name tAAt. Like the other games in the series, the aim of the game is to cause as much chaos as possible.

Turbo Dismount's gameplay involves the player placing a crash test dummy in one of a wide selection of vehicles and aim to cause as much damage as possible to rack up points to achieve a high score. After each crash, the player can choose to view the crash with an adjustable replay feature. The game also allows the player to create their own courses and share them with other players online.

The game received generally positive reviews, with critics praising the presentation and the camera, but was criticised for being limited in scope. The game has been downloaded over 400,000 times on Steam and over 50 million on Google Play. A sequel, Turbo Dismount 2, released into early access via Steam on January 23, 2025, and later fully releasing on March 13, 2026.

== Gameplay ==
A view of a crash caused in a sports car, through the replay feature.

Turbo Dismount is a vehicle simulator with a focus on ragdoll physics, much like the other games in the Dismount series starting with Stair Dismount (Note: Known by its original Finnish name "Porrasturvat".) in 2002. The player is in-charge of a crash test dummy, which is called Mr. or Ms. Dismount based on the player's choice, (Note: More dummy types were added in a future update.) that can be put in a variety of vehicles. The dummy can switch positions in or on the vehicle to change the outcome of the crash. Some vehicles the player can choose from are a sports car, a truck, a bus, a fire truck or a tricycle; each varying in shapes and stats. At the time of the game's release in early access, the game featured 10 vehicles and 11 levels for the player to choose from.

Within the crash courses, the player can place down obstacles such as brick walls, ramps and turbo pads to alter the outcome of the crash. The player can also be chased by police cars. The player can then send the vehicle using changeable paths into a level to cause damage and rack up points to achieve a high score. Alternatively the player can switch to manual steering, so they can control where they crash. To activate the simulation, the player uses a gauge to set the acceleration of the vehicle. After the crash is complete, the player can use an instant rewind feature to play back the crash from different camera angles, such as to a first-person perspective, and replay speeds. The game's replay feature allows players to record and share their crashes onto social media. (Note: The iOS version of Turbo Dismount's recording feature ran on the Everyplay service.) The Steam version of Turbo Dismount allows players to create their own levels that can be shared on the Steam platform for other players to download.

== Development and release ==
=== Development ===
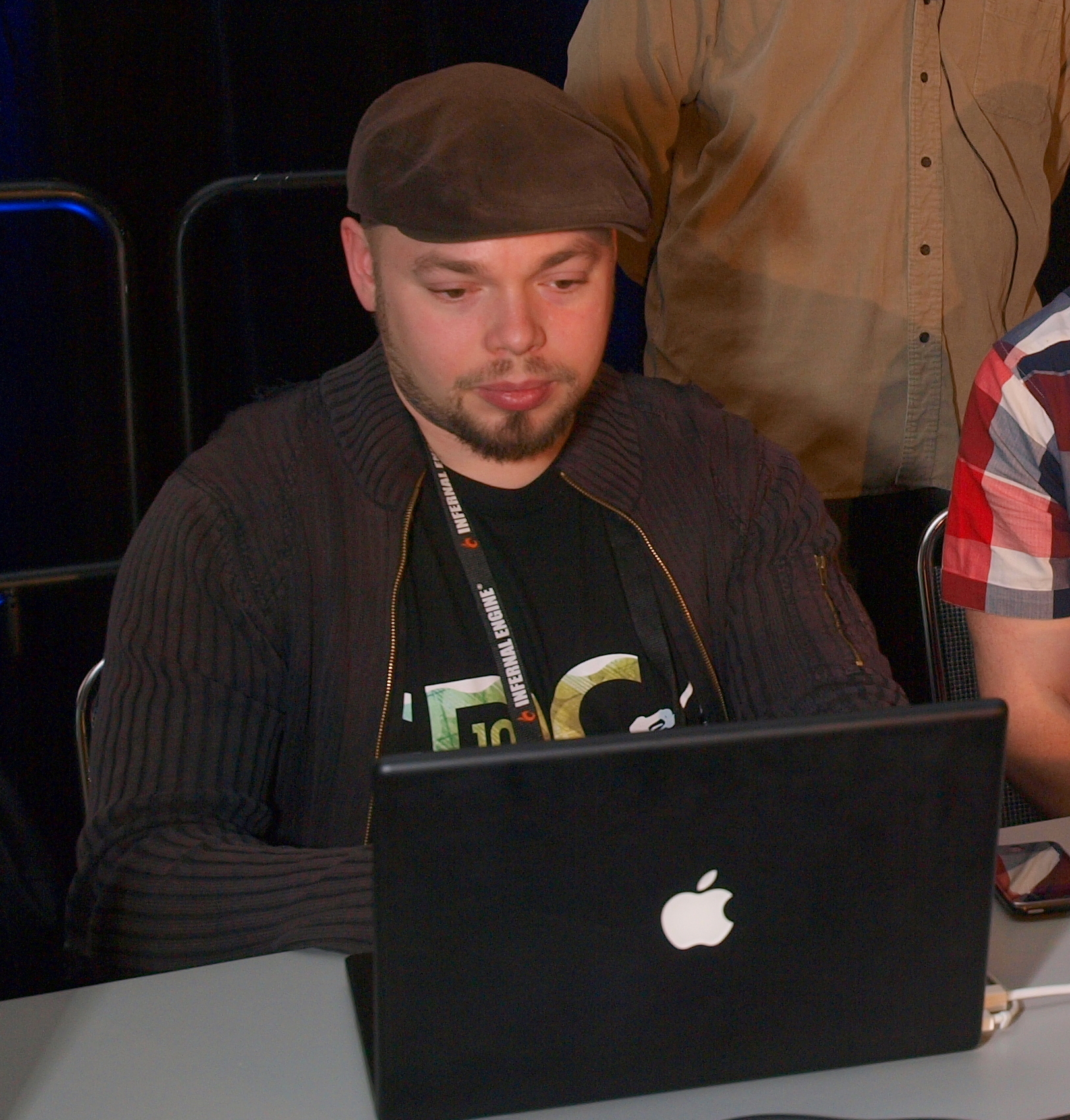
Secret Exit CEO Jani Kahrama at GDC 2010

Turbo Dismount was developed and published by Finnish-based game developer Secret Exit Ltd., with company founder and CEO Jani Kahrama serving as co-developer alongside Jouni Tuovinen, Niko Stenberg and Taina Myöhänen, credited under Team Secret Exit. The game was developed using the Unity game engine.

During development, Team Secret Exit intended to defy the standard of most ragdoll/physics sims by making Mr. Dismount a more sympathetic character towards the player. One way the developers displayed this was by having Mr. Dismount cling to vehicles, making it look like the dummy is gripping on for dear life when the vehicle is sent out to crash. During an interview with Kill Screen, Kahrama went on to say the crash dummies themselves were inspired by "little posable wooden mannequins" and was quoted as saying:

Mr. Dismount is not a crash-test dummy, he's an abstraction of a human figure, by having a simplified, abstract visual style the viewer's attention is not on the surface details, but instead on the movement itself.

Another way the developers tried to make the player feel empathetic towards Mr. Dismount was by making the player focus on the sound design of the dummy during the crash. By having Mr. Dismount make gruesome sounds during impacts, without the use of gory imagery, Kahrama believes it would evoke "a stronger emotional response than full-on graphic violence".

=== Release ===
Turbo Dismount was unveiled at GDC 2013 and was described as a follow up to Stair Dismount. The game was scheduled to release in late 2013, with the mobile version releasing first and the devs aiming towards a Steam release later on with Steam Greenlight. During a talk at Pocket Gamer Connects Helsinki in November 2016, Jani Kahrama mentioned that during development, Secret Exit was close to bankruptcy, and so they decided to release a playable web demo before going through Steam Greenlight, which Kahrama said they got through rather quickly. Secret Exit ended up releasing the game on Steam in early access in January 2014, with the full version releasing later on May 21 the same year. The game was later brought over to the App Store on September 24, 2014, and on Google Play Store on November 12, with the latter being optimised for the Nvidia Shield Tablet. The mobile version of the game is freemium based, with 3 levels and vehicles available at the start. The game can be purchased in full or bought with in-app purchases for individual levels, with each purchase reducing the total price.

According to Kahrama, the game had already become profitable by the time early access was finished and continued on to say that the mobile version of the game became the most profitable. One aspect of this success was attributed to YouTube, claiming that content creators such as PewDiePie and Markiplier were key in helping make the game visible to a wider audience.

=== Updates ===
Another aspect of the game's success was attributed to frequent updates. As of November 2016, Turbo Dismount was updated 22 times with each update adding at least a new vehicle, cosmetic or level. Some updates were seasonal; in 2014 and 2016 for its respective winter seasons, the developers added a turkey head cosmetic and a couch vehicle respectively. Meanwhile, in March 2015, a superbike, a level and new summer related cosmetics were added. To celebrate the date Back to the Future Part II was set, an update was launched that added an homage to the DMC DeLorean time machine was added in the form of the "LeDorean" vehicle.

During an update in February 2015, manual steering was granted to every level in the game and also introduced the police car hazard. In addition, new dummy types were added in a free character bundle. Later that same year, in addition to a new vehicle and cosmetics, support for iPhone 6s and iPad Pro was added.

== Reception ==
Reception

Aggregate score
Aggregator	Score
Metacritic	85/100

Review scores
Publication	Score
Gamezebo	80/100
Pocket Gamer	3.5/5
TouchArcade	5/5

=== Critical reviews ===
Turbo Dismount received "generally favourable" reviews according to review aggregator website Metacritic, achieving a score of 85/100 based on 5 reviews.

Critics praised the game for its presentation and cartoony violence. Many claimed the fun of the game came from watching the chaos that could be caused. Andrew Fretz of TouchArcade described the dissonance between the aspect of being a "light-hearted physics sim" whilst featuring "high speed collisions and dismemberment" to be one of the big enjoyments of the game for him. The cartoony violence of the game had Pocket Gamer's Nadia Oxford recommend the game to "fans of slapstick antics from The Three Stooges".

The camera and replay feature were also received positively. The replay feature was described as having a lot of options to review the crashes; the feature supported the gameplay to the fullest according to Gamezebo. Pocket Gamer described the camera as being executed well for being fully adjustable.

Critics were mixed on the game's overall substance, describing it as being "a bit shallow". Carter Dotson from Gamezebo noted that whilst Turbo Dismount was fun and had variety, it was "limited in scope" and "repetitive"; detailing that the game did not have a lot to offer outside of the main gameplay and said this likely came down to the concept rather than execution.

=== Sales ===
According to analysis firm Sensor Tower, the game is believed to have been downloaded around 482,000 times on Steam, whereas the Android version on the Google Play Store is believed to have an install base of over 50 million. For the iOS version, the game appeared in the top 10 most downloaded free apps for 2 weeks after release.

== Sequel ==
On August 8, 2024, a sequel titled Turbo Dismount 2 was announced for release in 2024. The sequel adds the ability to have multiple dummies ride the same vehicle at once as well as introduce new obstacles such as jelly cubes. An enhanced movie mode was also added to the replay system. Alongside the previous the vehicle destruction game mode, the game introduces other game goals such as time trials, navigating obstacle courses and escaping the police. The game was released on Steam in early access on January 23, 2025. The game would later fully release on March 13, 2026.
