= Kaptain Brawe: A Brawe New World =

2011 adventure puzzle video game

- Developer: Cateia Games
- Series: Kaptain Brawe
- Platforms: Microsoft Windows, Windows Phone, Mac OS X, IOS, Android
- Release: 2011
- Genres: Adventure, hidden object, puzzle
- Mode: Single player

Kaptain Brawe: A Brawe New World is a point n' click adventure video game developed by Cateia Games. It was released in 2011 for Microsoft Windows, Windows Phone, Mac, iOS and Android. It follows the adventures of Kaptain Brawe, a Space Police officer who embarks on a journey filled with quests, conspiracies and general chaos, as he follows the lead of two kidnapped alien scientists.

== Reception ==
The PC version holds a score of 69 based on six reviews on Metacritic and 78.79% based on four reviews on GameRankings. The iOS version holds a score of 76 based on eight reviews on Metacritic, and 75.83% on Gamerankings.

== Sequel ==
A sequel titled Kaptain Brawe 2: A Space Travesty launched on Kickstarter with the goal of obtaining $150,000 and was to be written by Steve Ince and designed in part by Bill Tiller. However it never reached its goal and was cancelled as a result.
