= Rekoil =

2014 video game

- Developer: Plastic Piranha
- Publisher: 505 Games
- Engine: Unreal Engine 3
- Platforms: Microsoft Windows; Xbox 360 (as Rekoil: Liberator)
- Release: Microsoft Windows; 28 January 2014; Xbox 360 (as Rekoil: Liberator); 29 January 2014
- Genre: First-person shooter
- Mode: Multiplayer

Rekoil (working title Rikochet) is a multiplayer first-person shooter video game developed by Plastic Piranha and published by 505 Games. It features downtrodden "Minutemen" pitted against their oppressors, Darkwater Inc, in a world where a pandemic has swept across the globe.

== Gameplay ==
Rekoil's gameplay consists of class-based infantry combat, where players choose from a number of different specialized roles.

On 1 October 2012, a closed beta for Rekoil launched. The game was available on the Steam Greenlight Program.

== Reception ==
Reception

Aggregate scores
| Aggregator | Score |
|---|---|
| GameRankings | (PC) 30.56% (X360) 42.50% |
| Metacritic | (PC) 32/100 (X360) 31/100 |

Review scores
| Publication | Score |
|---|---|
| Destructoid | 2.5/10 |
| Game Informer | 2/10 |
| GameRevolution | 2/5 |
| GameSpot | 3/10 |
| IGN | 3/10 |

Rekoil was universally panned upon release. Aggregating review websites GameRankings and Metacritic gave the Microsoft Windows version 30.56% based on 9 reviews and 32/100 based on 11 reviews and the Xbox 360 version 42.50% based on 6 reviews and 31/100 based on 5 reviews.

Paul Tamburro from Game Revolution gave the game a 4/10, praising its gameplay, but criticizing its frame-rate issues during launch, prominent balancing issues in multiplayer matches, poor map design, and poorly detailed character models. He also cited that such issues have made the game's servers under-populated. He stated that "It is impossible to recommend Rekoil, a game which is swiftly heading towards stagnation before it ever had a chance to prove itself."

Ian Bonds from Destructoid gave the game a 2.5/10, praising the game mode Rekondite, but criticizing the lack of a single-player campaign, poor weapon accuracy and controls, generic-looking maps, and uninspired character models. He stated that "What [Rekoil] tries to do to make itself stand out it fails at, and the one aspect every shooter should have, competent shooting, just isn't there. There is literally nothing to justify the $15 price-point".

Dan Ryckert from Game Informer gave the game a 2/10, criticizing uninspired game modes, classes and maps, dated visuals, long loading times, poor voice acting, numerous bugs, lag and crashing issues, low replay value, poorly-designed spawn points, as well as the lifeless community. He stated that "There is no reason to ever play Rekoil. If you were to compile a list of the most overused elements of multiplayer FPS from the dawn of the genre to today, Rekoil would be a much crappier version of what you’re imagining."
