= Traps n' Gemstones =

2014 video game

Traps n’ Gemstones
- Developer: Donut Games
- Publisher: Donut Games
- Platforms: iOS, Android
- Release: July 23, 2014
- Genre: Platform

Traps n’ Gemstones is a mobile game developed by Swedish indie studio Donut Games and published on July 23, 2014. It is available on iOS and Android.

== Reception ==
The game has a rating of 93% on Metacritic based on 6 critic reviews.

Grab It Magazine said "Known for its short and sweet bite-sized gems, Donut Games has reinvented itself. This perfect blend of Metroidvania exploration and Indiana Jones like action makes for the ultimate long black: perhaps we’ve seen the last of Donut’s expressos." TouchArcade wrote "Traps n' Gemstones could probably benefit from a little more flash and razzle-dazzle, and a few bosses wouldn't hurt, but I'm not going to gripe too much when what's here is as good as it is. " Gamezebo wrote "Traps n' Gemstones could probably benefit from a little more flash and razzle-dazzle, and a few bosses wouldn't hurt, but I'm not going to gripe too much when what's here is as good as it is. " Gamezebo said "An ambitious yet inviting freeform platform-adventure that strikes the perfect balance between depth and accessibility. " Multiplayer.it said "Traps n' Gemstones is a fun and compelling metroidvania kind of game, suited for both newcomers and veterans of the genre." 148apps wrote "Fight mummies, dig tunnels, and ride a runaway minecart to discover ancient secrets in this throwback exploration game."
