= CounterSpy (video game) =

2014 video game

- Developer: Dynamighty
- Publisher: Sony Computer Entertainment
- Director: David Nottingham
- Producer: Jeff Morris
- Designer: Ed Kay
- Programmer: John Elliot
- Artists: Mark Cordell Holmes; Bob Archibald
- Composer: Jesse Harlin
- Engine: Unity
- Platforms: PlayStation 3; PlayStation 4; Vita; Android; iOS
- Release: PS3, PS4, Vita: NA: August 19, 2014; EU: August 20, 2014; JP: August 21, 2014; iOS, Android; September 5, 2014
- Genre: Stealth
- Mode: Single-player

CounterSpy is a side-scrolling stealth video game developed by American independent studio Dynamighty and published by Sony Computer Entertainment as a cross-buy and cross-save title for the PlayStation 3, PlayStation 4, and PlayStation Vita. Subsequently, the game was released on Android and iOS on September 5, 2014.

The games received mixed to positive reviews and was praised for its art and soundtrack.

== Gameplay ==
CounterSpy is a 2.5D side-scroller with stealth elements and randomly generated levels. Set in an alternate version of the Cold War, players play as a counter agent sent to infiltrate the bases of opposing countries in order to prevent either of them from launching nuclear weapons. Movement largely takes place on a 2D plane, whilst specially marked areas allow the player aim their weapon in 3D space. The game's atmosphere is heavily inspired by 1960s spy fiction such as James Bond, and The Man from U.N.C.L.E. Score multiplier is awarded for making consecutive stealth kills. The main aim of the game is to collect enemy plans which help to further the story and shut down the base's weapon at the end of each level. Players can also collect intel, which serves as the game's currency, as well as plans which unlock new weapons and special formulas. Prior to each mission, players can spend intel to refill ammo, purchase and equip unlocked weapons, or equip up to three single use formulas which make the game easier, such as increased stealth or health. If a player beats a rival player's score, they can encounter them during the next level and retrieve bonus intel from them.

The main thing the player must be cautious about is the DEFCON status of both sides. This raises if the player is caught by security cameras or if a guard is allowed to radio in after becoming suspicious, and will automatically go up a level if the player is killed. Players can lower the DEFCON status by forcing white-uniformed officers to surrender without killing them, or by using a certain formula. If the DEFCON status reaches DEFCON 1, the player will have a limited amount of time to reach the end of the level and shut down the weapon before it is launched, at which point the game will end.

== Development ==
The game was developed with assistance from Foster City Studio. While historically known for collaborating with the series' respective large development studios, CounterSpy marks the first time they've teamed up with an indie development team, Dynamighty. The team comprises past staff from LucasArts and Pixar.

== Reception ==
Reception

Review score
Publication	Score
Hardcore Gamer	3/5

Hardcore Gamer gave the game a 3/5, saying "CounterSpy's awesome improvisational take on stealth can be hindered by both framerate inconsistencies and occasional perspective oddities." IGN rated it 7/10, praising the game's concept, art and soundtrack while citing the inconsistent AI and "occasional control issues". Polygon also praised the game's overall presentation, "but its interactivity is ugly enough to make for an unfortunate pairing when the balance is measured" and rated it 5/10.
