= Shadow Blade =

2014 video game

- Kuro, the main character of the game as depicted on published promotional material
- Developer: Dead Mage
- Publisher: Crescent Moon Games
- Engine: Unity
- Platforms: iOS; Android; Ouya
- Release: iOS; January 16, 2014 Android; February 27, 2014 Ouya; March 4, 2014
- Genre: Platformer
- Mode: Single-player

Shadow Blade is a 2014 action-platform game developed by Dead Mage and published by Crescent Moon Games for iOS, Android and Ouya. A port for Microsoft Windows and modern consoles was released as Shadow Blade: Reload.

== Gameplay ==
The game consists of bite-sized levels and rewards the player based on three factors: the total time to traverse the level from start to the end, the number of orbs collected across the level and the number of hidden objects found.

The main challenges revolve around precision platforming, combat and stealth play.

== Story ==
Kuro is a young man on his quest to become the Shadow Blade. He must seek the teachings of the last remaining ninja master. The player guides him through challenging levels, around countless traps, sneaking past enemies or right over their dead bodies. The player has to be fast, be stealthy, be aware of their environment, and be a ninja.

== Reception ==
Reception

Aggregate scores
| Aggregator | Score |
|---|---|
| GameRankings | 81.88% |
| Metacritic | 81/100 |

Review scores
| Publication | Score |
|---|---|
| IGN | 80/100 |
| VideoGamer.com | 9/10 |
| 148Apps | 4.5/5 |
| 3DJuegos | 8/10 |
| Pocket Gamer | 9/10 |
| TouchArcade | 4/5 |

Shadow Blade's reception was generally positive, with an average of 81 out of 100 on Metacritic. Shadow Blade was also the Apple App Store's Editor's Choice in the week of its release.

VideoGamer gave Shadow Blade 9 out of 10, writing, "Easily one of the better mobile games in recent memory, Shadowblade is a shining beacon and a stinging lesson to other developers. This is the bar. Now you try and raise it."

Littlehampton Gazette wrote, "Shadow Blade plays like a new ninja graduate slashing and spinning out of the blocks, intent on redefining your impression of the very best action platformers gone before. ... There's drama, great design and drool-worthy danger at the end of every digit swipe - just cut to the chase and download this razor-sharp slice 'em up."

Some critics have praised the game's touch controls; 148Apps wrote, "Shadow Blade is a stylish trial platformer that's hard to put down thanks in large part to its intuitive touchscreen controls."
