= Plunder Pirates =

2014 mobile video game

- Developer: Midoki
- Publisher: Midoki
- Platforms: iOS, Android
- Release: iOS: CAN: June 16, 2014; WW: September 17, 2014; Android: WW: April 22, 2015
- Genre: Strategy
- Mode: Massively multiplayer online game

Plunder Pirates is a freemium mobile MMO pirate-themed strategy video game, inspired by Clash of Clans, developed and published by Midoki. For iOS, it soft-launched in Canada and Finland on June 16, 2014, and the worldwide iOS release was on September 17, 2014. The game was one of the first to use Metal for advanced graphics in iOS 8. The Android version was released on April 22, 2015. It was originally published by Rovio Stars.

As of December 2014, the game had over 5 million players.

== Gameplay ==
Plunder Pirates is a multiplayer game in which players build a base, train pirates, explore the sea, defend against players and attack other players to earn gold and grog, which can then be used to build defences and buildings. The player can complete quests while doing those activities. The game differs from Clash of Clans by being in 3D and the player can control the camera.

Plunder Pirates features a variety of unit classes, each with unique roles in battle. These include tanks, support troops, ranged units, specialists and airborne unit. PocketGamer highlighted the unit’s ability to add a new layer of tactical depth to the game, enriching combat and strategic options.

The gameplay environment has received seasonal updates for Halloween, Christmas and Chinese New Year.

=== Buildings ===
Buildings have many uses such as storing a player's gold and grog. Buildings can be defensive, which can be cannons, mystic mortars, ground pounders, gun towers, mines, mystic mines, legendary mines, flame traps, shark traps, bunkers, pirate ship, and the pirate hall at upgrade level 9 or higher. Players automatically collect resources with gold mines and grog collectors. All buildings get stronger when upgraded with resources.

=== Rumbles ===
Rumbles are quick 24 hour wars between two rival guilds. To win, a guild must collect more battle points than the other guilds. If a player finds a member of an opposing guild while looking for pirates to attack, the player gets a guild war bonus and get a percentage increase on the number of battle points gained. The guild that wins gets resources such as gems, battle points and a large amount of gold while the losers get less gold, grog, and battle points, and no gems. To start a guild war the captain or quartermaster starts it.

=== Events ===
Events are regular, seven day competitions that are based on either an individual player or a guild's progress. The players earn rewards by collecting Event Tokens.

=== Legendary Pirates ===
As of August 2015, the game included Legendary Pirates - an individual unit that provides various additional attacking and defensive capabilities. To date there are twelve Legendary Pirates.

=== Gems ===
Aside from gold, grog, battle points and exploration points, the game also uses gems as a currency. Gems can be awarded for completing certain missions, getting them in chests or finding them in the sea and can be purchased using real money. Gems can be used to speed up every aspect of the game; from construction time to pirate recruitment to research. They can also be used to purchase more gold and grog. If you buy enough gems you will get a reward of some extra battle points and exploration points.

=== Battle Points ===
Battle points are gained by attacking other players and NPC bases, in chests, in the sea exploring, killing sea creatures and completing errands. They are used for upgrading buildings such as the academy and mystic mortars.

=== Exploration Points ===
Exploration points are gained by exploring the sea, in the sea, defeating sea creatures and doing errands. They are used for upgrading buildings like the lighthouse that is used to upgrade a player's pirate ship.

== Reception ==
Reception

Aggregate score
Aggregator	Score
Metacritic	71/100

Plunder Pirates received mixed reviews, with a Metacritic score of 71/100 based on 5 reviews. The consensus of reviewers is that it is a good strategy management game that is very similar to Clash of Clans.

Plunder Pirates received the UK TIGA Game Industry Award for best debut game published by a new studio in 2014.

Plunder Pirates received best "New Games IP - Mobile" at the British Develop Awards 2015.
