= Bardbarian =

2014 video game

- Developer: TreeFortress Games
- Publisher: Bulkypix
- Platforms: Android, iOS, Mac OS X, Windows
- Release: iOS; January 16, 2014; Android: WW: February 14, 2014 (Amazon Appstore); WW: March 13, 2014 (Google Play); Mac, Windows; April 1, 2014
- Mode: Single-player

Bardbarian is a multi-platform indie game developed by TreeFortress Games and published by BulkyPix in 2014.

== Development ==
It was built using Adobe AIR platform with the Starling Framework, and the ActionScript port of Spriter for the SpriteSheets.

== Release ==
Bardbarian was released for iOS on January 16, 2014, for Android's Amazon Appstore on February 14 and Google Play on March 13, and for Windows and Mac OS X on April 1, 2014. After being greenlit by the community, it was released on Steam on April 1, 2014, and featured characters from fellow indie games Octodad: Dadliest Catch, Shellrazer, Super Meat Boy and The Binding of Isaac. The iOS version of the game became part of GameClub in April 2020.

== Reception ==
Reception

Aggregate score
Aggregator	Score
Metacritic	(iOS) 83/100 (PC) 40/100

Review scores
Publication	Score
Gamezebo	(iOS) 5/5
Pocket Gamer	(iOS) 4/5
TouchArcade	(iOS) 5/5
National Post	(iOS) 8.5/10

The iOS version received "favorable" reviews, while the PC version received unfavorable reviews, according to the review aggregation website Metacritic.
