= Secret Ponchos =

2014 video game

- Developer: Switchblade Monkeys
- Publisher: Switchblade Monkeys
- Engine: PhyreEngine
- Platforms: PlayStation 4 Microsoft Windows
- Release: PlayStation 4 December 2, 2014; Microsoft Windows; October 13, 2015
- Genre: Top-down shooter
- Mode: Multiplayer

Secret Ponchos is an online multiplayer top-down shooter developed by Canadian indie studio Switchblade Monkeys. The game was released in Early Access in July 2014 for Windows and on December 2, 2014, for PlayStation 4. The game was released on PC as Most Wanted Edition on October 13, 2015, with more characters and maps. The PlayStation 4 version has added these expansion packs.

== Gameplay ==
The game is set in the Wild West, where the player is an outlaw and fugitive. The primary focus is player versus player (PvP), where players duel online to gain reputation and notoriety. The game plays from a top-down perspective. The controls play like twin stick shooters.

Players who perform well receive a bounty on their heads, where they become the targets of players who want to receive the bounty's increased reputation reward. Other players can team up against the player with the bounty.

There are five maps, multiple game modes, and multiple characters. Every character has a dual-function weapon (e.g., a revolver that fires strong shots up close and rapid shots at a distance) and a secondary item, like dynamite. The PC Most Wanted Edition has 10 different characters.

The goal is to win the duels that can be 1v1 or 3v3 using better control and strategic use of the environment.

== Development ==
Switchblade Monkeys, an indie game developer, is a five-person team with seven extra contributors. Company president Yousef Mapara was formerly an art director at Radical Entertainment, and left to make his own iPhone game. Daunted by the realities of the iOS App Store competition, he didn't continue.

The game's name comes from the title of an internal production blog, which became popular with the developers. The team was inspired by Team Fortress, Street Fighter II, and League of Legends. The company was approached at PAX Prime by Sony representatives who played the game for 20 minutes, watched others play the game, and eventually introduced themselves to ask the developers to consider bringing the game to PlayStation 4. When the developers responded that they did not have the money, the representatives offered development kits and asked how they could reduce the company's barriers.

The team planned to implement cloth physics and ambient lighting between E3 2013 and release to take advantage of the PlayStation 4's advanced capabilities. Switchblade has also considered downloadable content such as new game modes and characters, including a capture point map that would function similar to that of League of Legends.

It was announced ahead of the 2013 PAX East convention and confirmed as a PlayStation 4-exclusive during Sony's E3 2013 press conference. It was released on PS4 on December 2, 2014, as was featured as part of PS Plus's December Free Game Collection.

The Windows version was officially announced before the 2014 PAX East convention and developer Caley Smyth told reporters the game will be released sometime in July 2014. The game entered Steam Early Access in July 2014, and was released as the Most Wanted Edition in October 2015.

== Reception ==
IGN rated the game 7/10, with reviewer Mikel Reparaz complimenting the depth of the different characters' gameplay, which he said makes them fun to master. However, he said the game "doesn't have much to progress through" otherwise, with only five characters, four stages and three game modes available in the game at that time. Reviewing the PC Most Wanted Edition in October 2015, Paul Tamburro made similar points, praising the "surprising complexity of its core gameplay" that facilitated "some truly intense shootouts". However, he said that a small online community led to frequent connection issues as well as unbalanced matches.
