= Shadow Blade: Reload =

- Developer(s): Dead Mage; Crescent Moon Games (iOS)
- Publisher(s): Dead Mage
- Engine: Unity
- Platform(s): Microsoft Windows; OS X iOS; Linux; PlayStation 4 Nintendo Switch
- Release: Windows, OS X: WW: August 10, 2015; iOS: WW: February 11, 2016; Linux: WW: February 29, 2016; PlayStation 4: WW: May 31, 2016; Nintendo Switch: EU: March 30, 2019; NA: April 3, 2019
- Genre(s): Platform
- Mode(s): Single-player

Shadow Blade: Reload is a platform game in which the player assumes the role of a ninja named Kuro. The game has a mobile version called Shadow Blade.

The first boss fight with Kiamoto.

The game is still under development and features and content are planned for future updates. The full version will have more levels, a complete story campaign, and new game modes, as well as more integration with Steam features like the workshop, leaderboards, achievements, and cloud. The game's first public release was on July 21, 2014.

== Reception ==
The game received a score of 66/100 on Metacritic.
