= Tengami =

2014 video game

- Developer: Nyamyam
- Designers: Philip Tossell; Jennifer Schneidereit; Ryo Agarie
- Artists: Riko Agarie; Christiaan Moleman
- Composer: David Wise
- Platforms: Android; iOS; Wii U; Microsoft Windows; macOS
- Release: iOS; February 20, 2014; Wii U November 13, 2014; Microsoft Windows, macOS; January 15, 2015; Android; November 5, 2015
- Genres: Adventure, puzzle
- Mode: Single-player

Tengami is an adventure video game. It was released on iOS on February 20, 2014, on the Wii U on November 13, 2014, on Microsoft Windows and macOS on January 15, 2015, and on Android on November 5, 2015.

The game is an adventure game that takes place in ancient Japan. The style looks similar to traditional Japanese painting, with a 3D pop-up book look. The game includes puzzle-solving.

== Reception ==
Reception

Aggregate score
Aggregator	Score
Metacritic	iOS: 70/100; WIIU: 70/100; PC: 57/100

Review scores
Publication	Score
Eurogamer	iOS: 4/10
TouchArcade	iOS: 4/5

Eurogamer criticized the game, noting that while it had "a nice idea and some gorgeous artwork", it was "a mechanical MacGuffin hunt with no characters, no narrative, no substance or resonance beyond a couple of wistful haikus about seasons passing". It said the puzzles were not very elaborate, with movement being tedious.

264,000 downloads of Tengami have been sold across all platforms the end of May 2018, with 196,000 on iOS devices, 11,000 on PC and Mac, and another 11,000 on Wii U, which exceeded Nyamyam's expected sales on the console.
