= Pure Chess =

2012 video game

- Developer: VooFoo Studios
- Publishers: Ripstone; Play It
- Platforms: Microsoft Windows; PlayStation 3 PlayStation 4 PlayStation Vita; Nintendo 3DS; Wii U IOS; Android; Xbox One
- Release: EU: April 11, 2012; NA: May 29, 2012; Wii U & 3DS: WW: March 20, 2014; PlayStation 4: EU: April 16, 2014; NA: April 15, 2014
- Genre: Digital tabletop
- Modes: Single-player, Online

Pure Chess is a chess video game by British developer VooFoo Studios.

== Release ==
Pure Chess was released for the PlayStation Vita and the PlayStation 3. The PS3 version of the game is only available through digital download via the PlayStation Store. The PS3 version of Pure Chess was released on April 11, 2012, in Europe and on May 29, 2012, in North America. A PlayStation 4 version was later released on April 15, 2014, in North America and April 16, 2014, in Europe. A physical edition of this version was also published as a budget title by System 3 under their Play It label.

Pure Chess was announced for Wii U during an August 2013 Nintendo Direct for the PAL region. The game's publisher Ripstone later confirmed the game for the Nintendo 3DS as well. In addition, it was also confirmed that cross-platform play will be supported between both Wii U and Nintendo 3DS versions, as well as with players playing the mobile versions of the game, and possibly even Sony's PlayStation consoles.

On September 9, 2016, Pure Chess: Grandmaster Edition was made available for the Xbox One and PC using Steam.

== Reception ==
=== Commercial ===
Pure Chess was the 11th best-selling PlayStation Network game and the 4th best-selling PS Vita game in June 2012.

=== Critical ===
Reception

Aggregate score
Aggregator	Score
Metacritic	63/100 (Vita); 61/100 (Wii U)

Review scores
Publication	Score
IGN	5.5/10
Pocket Gamer	7/10

The game's single-player mode received praise from critics, but its multi-player mode was found disappointing by reviewers. IGN's Colin Moriarty wrote that the game's "single-player offerings challenge gamers with a variety of options that will please chess nuts, especially for its relatively low price, but added that "Pure Chess has completely unacceptable online functionality that's flagrantly clumsy and lazily executed."

Mike Rose of Pocket Gamer gave the PS Vita version of Pure Chess 3.5 out 5 stars. Rose opined that "The single-player component of Pure Chess is solid, though there are peripheral niggles," noting issues with its touch controls and camera movement. Rose was critical of the game's multiplayer mode, listing several flaws, namely its asynchronous nature.

== See also ==
- Chess Ultra, a 2017 chess game also published by Ripstone
