= List of video games released in 2015 =

The following is a comprehensive index of all games released in 2015, sorted chronologically by release date, and divided by quarter. Information regarding developer, publisher, operating system, genre, and type of release is provided where available

For a summary of 2015 in video games as a whole, see 2015 in video games.

== Legend ==
Video game platforms
3DS	Nintendo 3DS, 3DS Virtual Console, iQue 3DS	DROID	Android	FOS	Fire OS
iOS	iOS, iPhone, iPod, iPadOS, iPad, visionOS, Apple Vision Pro	LIN	Linux, SteamOS	OSX	macOS
OUYA	Ouya	PS3	PlayStation 3	PS4	PlayStation 4
PSV	PlayStation Vita	watchOS	watchOS	Wii	Wii, WiiWare, Wii Virtual Console
WiiU	Wii U, WiiU Virtual Console	WIN	Windows, all versions Windows 95 and up	WP	Windows Phone
XB360	Xbox 360, Xbox 360 Live Arcade	XBO	Xbox One		

Types of releases
Compilation	A compilation, anthology or collection of several titles, usually (but not always) belonging to the same series
Early access	A game launched in early access is unfinished and thus might contain bugs and glitches or have some of the content missing
Episodic	An episodic video game that is released in batches over a period of time
Expansion	A large-scale DLC to an already existing game that adds new story, areas and additions and/or changes to the game's mechanics
Full release	A full release of a game that launched in early access first
Limited	A special release (often called "Limited" or "Collector's Edition") with bonus collector's material. Often provided to people who pre-order a game
Port	The game first appeared on a different platform and a port was made. The game is like the original, with few or no differences
Remake	The game is an enhanced remake of an original, made using a new engine and/or assets and thus containing completely new sound, graphics and possibly changes to the story and/or gameplay
Remaster	The game is a remaster of an original, released on the same or different platform, with (usually minor) changes to graphics, sound and/or gameplay
Rerelease	The game was re-released on the same platform with no or only minor changes

Video game genres
4X	4X game	Action	Action game	Action RPG	Action role-playing game
Action-adventure	Action-adventure game	Adventure	Adventure game	Brawler	Beat 'em up
City builder	City-building game	CMS	Construction and management simulation	Dating sim	Dating sim
Dungeon crawl	Dungeon crawl	Fighting	Fighting game	FPS	First-person shooter
Graphic adventure	Graphic adventure	Hack and slash	Hack and slash	Horror	Horror game
Interactive film	Interactive film	Metroidvania	Metroidvania	MMO	Massively multiplayer online game
MOBA	Multiplayer online battle arena	Music	Music video game	Otome	Otome game
Party	Party video game	PCA	Point-and-click adventure	Platformer	Platformer
Puzzle	Puzzle video game	Puzzle-platformer	Puzzle-platformer	Racing	Racing video game
Rhythm	Rhythm game	Roguelike	Roguelike, Roguelite	RPG	Role-playing video game
RTS	Real-time strategy	RTT	Real-time tactics	Sandbox	Sandbox game
Scrolling shooter	Scrolling shooter	Shoot 'em up	Shoot 'em up	Shooter	Shooter game
Simulation	Simulation video game	Sports	Sports video game	Stealth	Stealth game
Strategy	Strategy video game	Survival	Survival game	Survival horror	Survival horror
Tactical RPG	Tactical role-playing game	TBS	Turn-based strategy	TBT	Turn-based tactics
TPS	Third-person shooter	Vehicle sim	Vehicle simulation game	Vehicular combat	Vehicular combat game
Visual novel	Visual novel	Wargame	Computer wargame		

== List ==
=== January–March ===
Release date	Title	Platform	Type	Genre	Developer	Publisher	Ref.
January 6	Duke Nukem 3D: Megaton Edition	PS3, PSV		FPS			
January 6	Woah Dave!	PSV		Platformer			
January 7	Danganronpa: Unlimited Battle (JP)	iOS					
January 7	Warhammer Quest	WIN, OSX, LIN		Tactical RPG			
January 8	Chariot	WiiU					
January 8	Miracle Fly	OUYA		Puzzle-platformer, Action-adventure			
January 8	Sword of Asumi	WIN					
January 9	Funk of Titans	XBO					
January 13	Atelier Ayesha Plus: The Alchemist of Dusk (NA)	PSV	Port	RPG	Gust	Koei Tecmo	
January 13	Brandish: The Dark Revenant	PSP, PSV		Action RPG			
January 13	Joe Danger 2: The Movie	PSV		Racing, Platformer			
January 15	Tengami	WIN		Adventure, Puzzle			
January 15	WWE Immortals	iOS, DROID		Fighting			
January 19	HuniePop	WIN, OSX, LIN		Tile-matching, Dating sim			
January 20	Blackguards 2	WIN, OSX					
January 20	Citizens of Earth	WIN, PS4, PSV, WiiU, 3DS					
January 20	Ironclad Tactics	PS4		Strategy			
January 20	Resident Evil HD Remaster	WIN, PS3, PS4, XB360, XBO	Remaster	Survival horror			
January 20	Saints Row IV: Re-Elected	PS4, XBO		Action-adventure			
January 20	Saints Row: Gat out of Hell	WIN, PS3, PS4, XB360, XBO		Action-adventure			
January 20	Splice	PS3, PS4					
January 21	Evolve: Hunters Quest	iOS					
January 22	Tales of Zestiria (JP)	PS3					
January 22	The Lego Movie Videogame	iOS		Action-adventure			
January 22	The Witcher: Battle Arena	iOS, DROID		MOBA			
January 23	Grey Goo	WIN		RTS			
January 23	Phantom Breaker: Battle Grounds	WIN		Brawler			
January 27	Dying Light	WIN, LIN, PS4, XBO	Original	Survival horror, Action-adventure			
January 27	Grim Fandango: Remastered	WIN, OSX, LIN, PS4, PSV		Graphic adventure			
January 27	Hyperdimension Neptunia Re;Birth2: Sisters Generation	PSV		RPG			
January 27	Nihilumbra	PSV		Puzzle-platformer			
January 29	Ace Combat 3D: Cross Rumble + (JP)	3DS					
January 29	Fahrenheit: Indigo Prophecy Remastered	WIN, OSX, LIN, iOS		Action-adventure			
January 29	Far Cry 4 (JP)	WIN, PS3, PS4, XB360, XBO					
January 29	Gravity Ghost	WIN		Physics			
January 29	Gunman Clive 2	3DS		Action, Platformer			
January 29	Heroes of Might and Magic III: HD Edition	WIN, iOS, DROID		TBS			
January 29	Pix the Cat	WIN		Snake, Puzzle			
January 29	Shin Megami Tensei: Devil Survivor 2 Record Breaker (JP)	3DS					
January 30	#IDARB	XBO					
January 30	Life Is Strange: Episode 1 - Chrysalis	WIN, PS3, PS4, XB360, XBO		Graphic adventure			
January 30	Raven's Cry	WIN, OSX, LIN, PS3, PS4, XB360		Action-adventure			
January 30	Unmechanical: Extended	XBO		Puzzle			
February 3	Apotheon	WIN, OSX, LIN, PS4		Platformer, Metroidvania			
February 3	Criminal Girls: Invite Only	PSV					
February 3	Game of Thrones: Episode 2 - The Lost Lords	WIN, OSX, PS3, PS4		Graphic adventure, Interactive film			
February 3	Kick & Fennick	PSV		Platformer			
February 3	Risk	PS4, XBO		Strategy, Wargame			
February 3	SpongeBob HeroPants	3DS, XB360, PSV		Action-adventure, Platformer			
February 4	Game of Thrones: Episode 2 - The Lost Lords	XB360, XBO		Graphic adventure, Interactive film			
February 4	Grow Home	WIN		Adventure, Platformer			
February 5	Cities XXL	WIN		City builder			
February 5	Dark Souls II: Scholar of the First Sin (JP)	PS3, XB360					
February 5	Dragon Ball: Xenoverse (JP)	PS4, PS3, XB360, XBO, WIN					
February 5	Game of Thrones: Episode 2 - The Lost Lords	iOS, DROID		Graphic adventure, Interactive film			
February 5	Moon Chronicles – Episode 2-4	3DS		FPS			
February 5	The Mighty Quest for Epic Loot	WIN		Action RPG			
February 10	AeternoBlade	PSV					
February 10	Don Bradman Cricket 14	PS4		Sports			
February 10	Evolve	WIN, PS4, XBO		FPS			
February 10	Rugby 15	WIN, PS3, PS4, PSV, XB360, XBO		Sports			
February 10	Super Stardust Ultra	PS4		Shoot 'em up			
February 10	Unmechanical: Extended	PS3, PS4		Puzzle			
February 11	Don Bradman Cricket 14	XBO		Sports			
February 11	Jungle Rumble	PSV		Rhythm, RTS, Puzzle			
February 11	Limbo	DROID		Puzzle-platformer			
February 11	Samurai Warriors 4-II (JP)	PS3, PS4, PSV					
February 12	3D Fantasy Zone	3DS		Scrolling shooter (horizontal)			
February 12	Final Fantasy Legends: Toki no Suishō (JP)	iOS, DROID					
February 12	Mighty Switch Force! Hose It Down!	iOS		Action, Puzzle-platformer			
February 13	Ace Combat Assault Horizon Legacy+	3DS		Action			
February 13	IronFall: Invasion	3DS		TPS			
February 13	Monster Hunter 4 Ultimate	3DS		Action RPG			
February 13	The Escapists	XBO					
February 13	The Legend of Zelda: Majora's Mask 3D	3DS		Action-adventure			
February 14	DreadOut act 2	WIN		Survival horror			
February 14	The Legend of Zelda: Majora's Mask 3D (JP)	3DS					
February 17	Dead or Alive 5 Last Round	PS3, PS4, XB360, XBO		Fighting			
February 17	Hand of Fate	WIN, OSX, LIN, PS4, XBO		Action RPG			
February 17	Paparazzi	WIN, PS4, WiiU					
February 17	Pillar	PS4		Puzzle			
February 17	Q*bert Rebooted	PS3, PS4, PSV		Action			
February 17	The Sims 4	OSX		Simulation			
February 17	Total War: Attila	WIN, OSX		RTS, TBS			
February 18	Pokémon Shuffle	3DS		Puzzle			
February 19	Agarest: Generations of War 2	WIN		Tactical RPG			
February 19	Dead or Alive 5 Last Round (JP)	PS3, PS4, XB360, XBO					
February 19	God Eater 2: Rage Burst (JP)	PS4, PSV					
February 19	Robot Roller-Derby Disco Dodgeball	WIN, LIN, OSX					
February 20	Hot Tin Roof: The Cat That Wore a Fedora	WIN, LIN, OSX		Platformer, Metroidvania	Glass Bottom Games		
February 20	Kirby and the Rainbow Curse	WiiU		Platformer			
February 20	Roundabout	XBO		Racing			
February 20	The Book of Unwritten Tales 2	WIN, OSX, LIN		PCA			
February 20	The Order: 1886	PS4		Action-adventure			
February 24	Dragon Ball Xenoverse	PS3, PS4, XB360, XBO		RPG			
February 24	htoL#NiQ: The Firefly Diary	PSV		Adventure, Puzzle			
February 24	Hyperdevotion Noire: Goddess Black Heart	PSV		Tactical RPG			
February 24	Limbo	PS4		Puzzle-platformer			
February 24	Resident Evil: Revelations 2: Episode 1 - Penal Colony	PS3, PS4		Survival horror			
February 24	Starwhal: Just the Tip	PS3, PS4					
February 24	There Came an Echo	WIN, OSX, LIN, PS4, XBO		RTT			
February 24	Under Night In-Birth Exe:Late	PS3		Fighting, Visual novel			
February 25	Heavenstrike Rivals - A Monster Tactical TCG!	iOS					
February 25	Homeworld Remastered Collection	WIN		RTS			
February 25	Oddworld: New 'n' Tasty	WIN, OSX, LIN		Cinematic platformer			
February 25	Resident Evil: Revelations 2: Episode 1 - Penal Colony	WIN, XB360, XBO		Survival horror			
February 26	Captain Earth: Mind Labyrinth (JP)	PSV					
February 26	Dragon Quest Heroes: Darkness Dragon and Castle of the World Tree (JP)	PS3, PS4					
February 27	Blackhole	WIN, OSX, LIN		Puzzle-platformer			
February 27	Dragon Ball Xenoverse	WIN		RPG			
February 27	Dynasty Warriors 8 Empires	WIN, PS3, PS4, XBO		Hack and slash, Action			
March 2	Five Nights at Freddy's 3	WIN		Survival horror, PCA			
March 3	Helldivers	PS3, PS4, PSV		Shoot 'em up			
March 3	La-Mulana EX	PSV		Platformer, Metroidvania			
March 3	OlliOlli2: Welcome to Olliwood	PS4, PSV		Sports			
March 3	Oreshika: Tainted Bloodlines	PSV		RPG			
March 3	Resident Evil: Revelations 2: Episode 2 - Contemplation	PS3, PS4		Survival horror			
March 3	Screamride	XB360, XBO		Puzzle			
March 3	Shiftlings	WIN, PS4, XBO					
March 3	White Night	WIN, PS4, XBO		Survival horror, Puzzle			
March 4	Resident Evil: Revelations 2: Episode 2 - Contemplation	WIN, XB360, XBO		Survival horror			
March 5	Etrian Mystery Dungeon (JP)	3DS					
March 5	Lego City Undercover: The Chase Begins (JP)	3DS					
March 5	Mario vs. Donkey Kong: Tipping Stars	3DS, WiiU		Puzzle			
March 5	Middle-earth: Shadow of Mordor (JP)	PS3, XB360					
March 5	OlliOlli	WiiU, 3DS		Sports			
March 5	Proun+	3DS					
March 6	OlliOlli	XBO		Sports			
March 6	Zombie Army Trilogy	WIN, PS4, XBO		Tactical shooter, Survival horror			
March 9	Mario vs. Donkey Kong: Tipping Stars (JP)	WiiU, 3DS					
March 9	Shelter 2	WIN, OSX		Survival			
March 10	Assassin's Creed Rogue	WIN		Action-adventure, Stealth			
March 10	Atelier Shallie: Alchemists of the Dusk Sea	PS3		RPG			
March 10	Cities: Skylines	WIN, OSX, LIN		City builder, CMS			
March 10	DmC: Definitive Edition	PS4, XBO		Action-adventure, Hack and slash			
March 10	Hotline Miami 2: Wrong Number	WIN, OSX, LIN, PS4, PSV		Shoot 'em up			
March 10	Mushroom Men: Truffle Trouble	WIN		Action-adventure, Platformer			
March 10	Resident Evil: Revelations 2: Episode 3 - Judgment	PS3, PS4		Survival horror			
March 10	Scram Kitty DX	PS4, PSV					
March 10	Tokyo Twilight Ghost Hunters	PS3, PSV		Adventure, Visual novel, Tactical RPG			
March 11	Ori and the Blind Forest	WIN, XBO		Platformer, Metroidvania			
March 11	Resident Evil: Revelations 2: Episode 3 - Judgment	WIN, XB360, XBO		Survival horror			
March 12	3D Out Run	3DS		Racing (arcade)			
March 12	Assassination Classroom: Grand Siege on Kuro-sensei (JP)	3DS					
March 12	Digimon Story: Cyber Sleuth (JP)	PSV					
March 12	Dreamfall Chapters Book 2 - Rebels	WIN		Adventure			
March 12	Dungeon Hunter 5	DROID, iOS, WP		Action RPG, Hack and slash			
March 12	Mario Party 10 (JP)	WiiU					
March 12	Sid Meier's Starships	WIN, OSX, iOS		TBS			
March 12	Trine: Enchanted Edition	WiiU		Puzzle-platformer, Action-adventure			
March 12	Yakuza 0 (JP)	PS3, PS4					
March 13	Code Name: S.T.E.A.M.	3DS					
March 17	Battlefield Hardline	WIN, PS3, PS4, XB360, XBO		FPS			
March 17	BioShock Infinite	LIN		FPS			
March 17	Blade Kitten Episode 2	WIN		Platformer			
March 17	Bladestorm: Nightmare	PS3, PS4, XBO		RTT			
March 17	Final Fantasy Type-0 HD	PS4, XBO		Action RPG			
March 17	Jamestown+	PS4		Bullet hell, Shoot 'em up			
March 17	Oceanhorn: Monster of Uncharted Seas	WIN		Action-adventure			
March 17	Resident Evil: Revelations 2: Episode 4 - Metamorphosis	PS3, PS4		Survival horror			
March 17	Soldner-X2: Final Prototype	PSV					
March 17	Tales from the Borderlands: Episode 2 - Atlas Mugged	WIN, PS3, PS4		Graphic adventure			
March 17	The Awakened Fate Ultimatum	PS3					
March 17	Woolfe: The Red Hood Diaries	WIN, PS4, XBO		Platformer, Hack and slash			
March 18	Resident Evil: Revelations 2: Episode 4 - Metamorphosis	WIN, XB360, XBO		Survival horror			
March 18	Tales from the Borderlands: Episode 2 - Atlas Mugged	XB360, XBO		Graphic adventure			
March 19	Final Fantasy Type-0 HD (JP)	PS4, XBO					
March 19	Minna de Spelunker Z (JP)	PS4					
March 19	Tales from the Borderlands: Episode 2 - Atlas Mugged	iOS		Graphic adventure			
March 19	Worlds of Magic	WIN		4X, TBS			
March 20	Fossil Fighters: Frontier	3DS		RPG			
March 20	Mario Party 10	WiiU		Party			
March 24	Bloodborne	PS4		Action RPG			
March 24	Borderlands: The Handsome Collection	PS4, XBO		Action RPG, FPS			
March 24	Damascus Gear: Operation Tokyo	PSV					
March 24	Game of Thrones: Episode 3 - The Sword in the Darkness	WIN, OSX, PS3, PS4		Graphic adventure, Interactive film			
March 24	Lego Ninjago: Shadow of Ronin	3DS, PSV					
March 24	Life Is Strange: Episode 2 - Out of Time	WIN, PS3, PS4, XB360, XBO		Graphic adventure			
March 24	Metal Slug 3	PS3, PS4, PSV		Run and gun			
March 24	Slender: The Arrival	PS4		Survival horror			
March 25	Game of Thrones: Episode 3 - The Sword in the Darkness	XB360, XBO		Graphic adventure, Interactive film			
March 25	Lakeview Cabin Collection	WIN, OSX		Action, Puzzle, Horror			
March 25	Slender: The Arrival	XBO		Survival horror			
March 26	Bloodborne (JP)	PS4					
March 26	Deception IV: The Nightmare Princess (JP)	PS3, PS4, PSV					
March 26	Disgaea 5: Alliance of Vengeance (JP)	PS4					
March 26	Game of Thrones: Episode 3 - The Sword in the Darkness	iOS, DROID		Graphic adventure, Interactive film			
March 26	Infinite Crisis	WIN		MOBA			
March 26	One Piece: Pirate Warriors 3 (JP)	PS3, PS4, PSV					
March 26	Pillars of Eternity	WIN, OSX, LIN		RPG			
March 26	Resident Evil 5: Gold Edition	WIN		TPS			
March 26	Sword Art Online: Lost Song (JP)	PS3, PSV					
March 26	Theatrhythm Dragon Quest (JP)	3DS					
March 26	Xuan-Yuan Sword: The Gate of Firmament (AS)	WIN		Action RPG			
March 27	Forza Horizon 2 Presents Fast & Furious	XB360, XBO		Racing			
March 27	Oddworld: New 'n' Tasty	XBO		Cinematic platformer			
March 30	Dead or Alive 5 Last Round	WIN		Fighting			
March 31	Axiom Verge	PS4		Metroidvania			
March 31	MLB 15: The Show	PS3, PS4, PSV		Sports			
March 31	Neverwinter	XBO		MMO, RPG			
March 31	Paperbound	WIN, PS4					
March 31	R.B.I. Baseball 15	PS4, XBO		Sports			
March 31	Run Sackboy! Run!	PSV		Puzzle-platformer			
March 31	Story of Seasons	3DS		Farming			
March 31	theHunter: Primal	WIN		Simulation			
March 31	Toukiden: Kiwami	PS4, PSV		Action RPG			
March 31	Woah Dave!	PS4		Platformer			

=== April–June ===
Release date	Title	Platform	Type	Genre	Developer	Publisher	Ref.
April 1	Dark Souls II: Scholar of the First Sin	WIN		Action RPG			
April 2	Box Boy!	3DS		Puzzle-platformer			
April 2	DuckTales Remastered	iOS, DROID		Platformer, Metroidvania			
April 2	Earth Defense Force 4.1: The Shadow of New Despair (JP)	PS4					
April 2	Rodea the Sky Soldier (JP)	Wii, WiiU, 3DS					
April 2	Steven Universe: Attack the Light!	iOS, DROID		RPG			
April 2	War for the Overworld	WIN, OSX, LIN		RTS, God game, Dungeon management			
April 2	Xenoblade Chronicles 3D (JP)	3DS					
April 3	Stealth Inc. 2: A Game of Clones	WIN, XBO		Platformer, Stealth			
April 7	Bastion	PS4		Action RPG			
April 7	Dark Souls II: Scholar of the First Sin	PS4, XBO		Action RPG			
April 7	Etrian Mystery Dungeon	3DS		RPG			
April 7	Krinkle Krusher	PS3, PS4, PSV		Tower defense			
April 7	MonsterBag	PSV		Puzzle, Stealth			
April 7	Mortal Kombat X	iOS, DROID		Fighting			
April 7	Stealth Inc. 2: A Game of Clones	PS3, PS4, PSV		Platformer, Stealth			
April 7	Tower of Guns	PS3, PS4		FPS			
April 8	Bloodsports. TV	WIN		MOBA			
April 8	Driver: Speedboat Paradise	iOS		Action-adventure, Racing			
April 8	Pokémon Rumble World	3DS		Action RPG			
April 9	Affordable Space Adventures	WiiU					
April 9	Dark Souls II: Scholar of the First Sin (JP)	PS4, XBO					
April 9	I am Bread	WIN		Action-adventure, Simulation			
April 10	Tower of Guns	XBO		FPS			
April 10	Xenoblade Chronicles 3D	3DS		Action RPG			
April 14	A-Train: City Simulator	3DS		Vehicle sim (train)			
April 14	Age of Wonders III	OSX, LIN		4X, TBS			
April 14	Grand Theft Auto Online	WIN	Port	Action-adventure	Rockstar North	Rockstar Games	
April 14	Grand Theft Auto V	WIN	Port	Action-adventure	Rockstar North	Rockstar Games	
April 14	Mortal Kombat X	WIN, PS4, XBO		Fighting			
April 14	Titan Souls	WIN, PS4, PSV		Action-adventure			
April 14	We Are Doomed	PS4					
April 16	3D Fantasy Zone II	3DS		Scrolling shooter (horizontal)			
April 16	Goat Simulator	XB360, XBO		Action			
April 16	Halo: Spartan Assault	iOS		Shoot 'em up (twin-stick)			
April 16	Halo: Spartan Strike	WIN, iOS, WP		Shoot 'em up (twin-stick)			
April 16	Lost Within	iOS, FOS					
April 17	Gradius V	PS3		Scrolling shooter			
April 20	Slow Down, Bull	WIN					
April 21	Assassin's Creed Chronicles: China	WIN, PS4, XBO		Action-adventure, Stealth			
April 21	Convoy	WIN, OSX		Roguelike, Strategy			
April 21	EA Sports UFC	iOS, DROID		Fighting, Sports			
April 21	LA Cops	PS4					
April 21	Shooting Love 200X	XB360		Shoot 'em up			
April 21	Shovel Knight	PS3, PS4, PSV		Action, Platformer			
April 22	Kalimba	WIN		Puzzle-platformer			
April 23	BlazBlue: Chronophantasma Extend (JP)	PS3, PS4, PSV, XBO					
April 23	Bravely Second: End Layer (JP)	3DS					
April 23	Crypt of the Necrodancer	WIN		Roguelike, Rhythm			
April 23	Does Not Commute	DROID, iOS		Puzzle, Strategy			
April 24	Dungeons 2	WIN, OSX		Strategy, Simulation, Dungeon management			
April 24	Happy Wars	XBO		Action, Tactical RPG			
April 24	Shantae and the Pirate's Curse	WIN		Platformer, Metroidvania			
April 25	Watch Quest! - Heroes of Time -	watchOS					
April 27	Hitman Go	WIN, WP		Puzzle			
April 27	Kerbal Space Program	WIN, OSX, LIN		Vehicle sim (spaceship)			
April 27	Shovel Knight	XBO		Action, Platformer			
April 28	Broken Age Act 2	WIN, OSX, LIN		PCA			
April 28	Broken Age: The Complete Adventure	PS4, PSV		PCA			
April 28	Magicka: Wizard Wars	WIN		Action-adventure			
April 28	Omega Quintet	PS4		Simulation, RPG			
April 28	Shadowrun Chronicles: Boston Lockdown	WIN, OSX, LIN		TBT, Scrolling shooter (isometric)			
April 28	Sketchcross	PSV					
April 28	State of Decay: Year-One Survival Edition	XBO		Action-adventure, Survival horror, Stealth			
April 28	Tropico 5	PS4		CMS, Government sim			
April 28	Verdun	WIN		FPS			
April 28	WWE 2K15	WIN		Sports			
April 28	Ys VI: The Ark of Napishtim	WIN		Action RPG			
April 29	Puzzle & Dragons: Super Mario Bros. Edition (JP)	3DS					
April 29	Xenoblade Chronicles X (JP)	WiiU					
April 30	Amiibo Tap: Nintendo's Greatest Bits	WiiU					
April 30	Block N Load	WIN		FPS, Sandbox			
April 30	Chroma Squad	WIN		Tactical RPG			
April 30	Karous	3DS		Scrolling shooter (vertical)			
April 30	Order of Battle: Pacific	WIN		Wargame			
May 1	Monument Valley	WP		Puzzle			
May 5	Cosmophony	PS3, PS4, PSV					
May 5	Ether One	PS4		Adventure			
May 5	Grim Fandango: Remastered	iOS, DROID		Graphic adventure			
May 5	Shin Megami Tensei: Devil Survivor 2 Record Breaker	3DS		Tactical RPG			
May 5	Wolfenstein: The Old Blood	WIN, PS4, XBO		FPS, Action-adventure, Stealth			
May 7	Project CARS	WIN		Racing			
May 7	Touhou 14: Double Dealing Character	WIN		Scrolling shooter			
May 9	Disney Infinity 2.0: Marvel Super Heroes	PSV		Action-adventure			
May 12	AirMech Arena	XBO		MOBA			
May 12	Attack on Titan: Humanity in Chains	3DS					
May 12	Color Guardians	PS4, PSV					
May 12	Final Fantasy IV: The After Years	WIN		RPG			
May 12	Final Fantasy X/X-2 HD Remaster	PS4		RPG			
May 12	Invisible, Inc.	WIN, OSX, LIN		TBT, Stealth			
May 12	Nom Nom Galaxy	PS4					
May 12	Project CARS	PS4, XBO		Racing			
May 13	Lifeless Planet	XBO		Puzzle-platformer			
May 14	3D Thunder Blade	3DS		Vehicular combat (plane)			
May 14	Axiom Verge	WIN		Metroidvania			
May 14	Galactic Civilizations III	WIN		4X, TBS			
May 14	Knights of Pen & Paper 2	iOS, DROID					
May 14	Not a Hero	WIN		Shooter			
May 14	Stretchmo	3DS		Puzzle			
May 19	Castaway Paradise	WIN		Life sim			
May 19	Hyperdimension Neptunia U: Action Unleashed	PSV		Action RPG, Hack and slash			
May 19	Life Is Strange: Episode 3 - Chaos Theory	WIN, PS3, PS4, XB360, XBO		Graphic adventure			
May 19	Ride	WIN, PS3, PS4, XB360, XBO		Racing			
May 19	The Witcher 3: Wild Hunt	WIN, PS4, XBO		Action RPG			
May 20	Neon Struct	WIN, OSX, LIN		Stealth			
May 21	Carmageddon: Reincarnation	WIN, OSX, LIN		Vehicular combat, Racing			
May 21	Sunset	WIN, OSX, LIN		Adventure			
May 21	Swords & Soldiers II	WiiU		RTS			
May 21	Til Morning's Light	iOS, DROID					
May 22	NASCAR '15	WIN, PS3, XB360		Racing (sim)			
May 22	Puzzle & Dragons Z + Super Mario Bros. Edition	3DS		RPG, Puzzle			
May 26	Akiba's Trip: Undead & Undressed	WIN		Action-adventure, Brawler			
May 26	Audiosurf 2	WIN		Puzzle, Rhythm			
May 26	Badland: Game of the Year Edition	PS3, PS4, PSV		Adventure			
May 26	Game of Thrones: Episode 4 - Sons of Winter	WIN, PS3, PS4		Graphic adventure, Interactive film			
May 26	Guilty Gear XX Accent Core Plus R	WIN					
May 26	Magicka 2	WIN, PS4		Action-adventure			
May 26	Octodad: Dadliest Catch	PSV		Adventure			
May 26	Roundabout	PS4		Racing			
May 26	Ultra Street Fighter IV	PS4		Fighting			
May 27	Catlateral Damage	WIN, OSX, LIN		Simulation			
May 27	Game of Thrones: Episode 4 - Sons of Winter	XB360, XBO		Graphic adventure, Interactive film			
May 27	Rogue Legacy	XBO		Platformer, Roguelike, Metroidvania			
May 28	Badland: Game of the Year Edition	WIN, OSX, LIN		Adventure			
May 28	Chaos Rings III	iOS, DROID		RPG			
May 28	Don't Starve: Giant Edition	WiiU		Survival			
May 28	Game of Thrones: Episode 4 - Sons of Winter	iOS		Graphic adventure, Interactive film			
May 28	Geometry Wars 3: Dimensions	iOS		Shoot 'em up			
May 28	Lara Croft: Relic Run	iOS, DROID, WP		Action-adventure, Endless runner			
May 28	Psycho-Pass: Mandatory Happiness (JP)	XBO					
May 28	The Talos Principle	DROID		Puzzle			
May 29	Arcade Archives: Moon Cresta	PS4					
May 29	Badland: Game of the Year Edition	XBO		Adventure			
May 29	The Fruit of Grisaia	WIN		Eroge, Visual novel			
May 29	Hyperdimension Neptunia Re;Birth2: Sisters Generation	WIN		RPG			
May 29	Splatoon	WiiU		TPS			
May 31	Dr. Mario 3DS (JP)	3DS					
June 1	Hatred	WIN		Shoot 'em up			
June 1	Massive Chalice	WIN, OSX, LIN, XBO		TBS, TBT			
June 2	Class of Heroes 2G	PS3		RPG			
June 2	The Escapists	PS4		Strategy, RPG			
June 2	Heroes of the Storm	WIN, OSX		MOBA			
June 2	Lord of Magna: Maiden Heaven	3DS		RPG			
June 2	Skulls of the Shogun: Bone-a-Fide Edition	PS4		TBT			
June 4	Hitman: Sniper	iOS, DROID		Shooting gallery			
June 4	Shiren the Wanderer: The Tower of Fortune and the Dice of Fate (JP)	PSV		Roguelike, RPG			
June 4	Stella Glow (JP)	3DS					
June 4	Trans-Galactic Tournament	PS4					
June 4	Wander	WIN, PS4		MMO			
June 5	D4: Dark Dreams Don't Die	WIN		Adventure			
June 5	SteamWorld Dig	XBO		Platformer, Action-adventure, Metroidvania			
June 9	The Elder Scrolls Online: Tamriel Unlimited	PS4, XBO		MMO, RPG			
June 9	Hustle Kings	PS4		Sports, Simulation			
June 9	Operation Abyss: New Tokyo Legacy	PSV					
June 11	Adventures of Pip	WiiU					
June 11	Alone in the Dark: Illumination	WIN		TPS			
June 11	Dr. Mario: Miracle Cure	3DS		Puzzle			
June 11	Rhythm Tengoku: The Best Plus (JP)	3DS					
June 11	Dragon Ball Z: Extreme Butōden (JP)	3DS		Fighting	Arc System Works	Bandai Namco Entertainment	
June 11	Sora no Kiseki FC Evolution (JP)	PSV					
June 11	Transistor	iOS		Action RPG, TBS			
June 12	Lego Jurassic World	WIN, PS3, PS4, PSV, XB360, XBO, WiiU, 3DS		Action-adventure			
June 14	Fallout Shelter	iOS		CMS			
June 16	Payday 2: Crimewave Edition	PS4, XBO		FPS, Stealth			
June 23	Batman: Arkham Knight	WIN, PS4, XBO	Original	Action-adventure	Rocksteady Studios	Warner Bros. Interactive Entertainment	
June 23	Devil May Cry 4: Special Edition	WIN, PS4, XBO		Action-adventure, Hack and slash			
June 23	PlanetSide 2	PS4		MMO, FPS			
June 23	Riptide GP2	PS4					
June 23	Shantae: Risky's Revenge - Director's Cut	PS4		Platformer, Metroidvania			
June 23	Tales from the Borderlands: Episode 3 - Catch A Ride	WIN, PS3, PS4, XB360, XBO		Graphic adventure			
June 24	Her Story	WIN, OSX, iOS		Interactive film			
June 24	MotoGP 15	WIN, PS3, PS4, XB360, XBO		Racing			
June 25	Art Academy: Home Studio	WiiU					
June 25	Chaos;Child (JP)	PS3, PS4, PSV					
June 25	Dragon Quest VI: Realms of Revelation	iOS, DROID		RPG			
June 25	Dreamfall Chapters: Book Three — Realms	WIN		Adventure			
June 25	Fire Emblem If (JP)	3DS					
June 25	Geometry Wars 3: Dimensions	DROID, FOS		Shoot 'em up			
June 25	Hotline Miami (JP)	PS4, PSV					
June 25	Hotline Miami 2: Wrong Number (JP)	PS4, PSV					
June 25	Lego Batman 3: Beyond Gotham	iOS		Action-adventure			
June 25	Persona 4: Dancing All Night (JP)	PSV					
June 25	Sonic Runners	iOS, DROID		Endless runner			
June 26	Toukiden: Kiwami	WIN		Action RPG			
June 30	BlazBlue: Chrono Phantasma Extend	PS3, PS4, XBO		Fighting			
June 30	Hyperdimension Neptunia Re;Birth3: V Generation	PSV		RPG			
June 30	Infinifactory	WIN, OSX, LIN		Puzzle			
June 30	J-Stars Victory VS+	PS4, PS3, PSV		Fighting			
June 30	Quiplash	WIN, PS3, PS4, XBO		Party	Jackbox Games	Jackbox Games	
June 30	Red Goddess: Inner World	PS4					
June 30	Ronin	WIN, LIN, OSX		Action, Platformer			
June 30	Samurai Warriors Chronicles 3	3DS, PSV		Hack and slash			
June 30	Whispering Willows	PS3, PS4, PSV		Adventure			

=== July–September ===
Release date	Title	Platform	Type	Genre	Developer	Publisher	Ref.
July 1	Rise of Incarnates	WIN		Fighting			
July 2	Ar Nosurge Plus: Ode to an Unborn Star	PSV		RPG			
July 4	Strawberry Cubes	WIN, OSX		Platformer	Loren Schmidt		
July 6	Knee Deep	WIN, OSX, LIN					
July 7	Geometry Wars 3: Dimensions	PSV		Shoot 'em up			
July 7	Pneuma: Breath of Life	PS4					
July 7	Rocket League	WIN, PS4		Sports			
July 7	Rumble City	DROID					
July 7	Skullgirls 2nd Encore	PS4		Fighting			
July 8	Worms World Party Remastered	WIN		Artillery, Strategy			
July 9	Dai Gyakuten Saiban: Naruhodō Ryūnosuke no Bōken (JP)	3DS					
July 9	Replay: VHS is not dead	WIN					
July 9	Rumble City	iOS					
July 9	Taiko no Tatsujin V Version (JP)	PSV					
July 9	Trove	WIN		Hack and slash			
July 10	F1 2015	WIN, PS4, XBO		Racing			
July 13	Prototype Biohazard Bundle	XBO		Action-adventure			
July 14	Deception IV: The Nightmare Princess	PS4, PS3, PSV		Action RPG, Tactical RPG			
July 14	The Fall	PS4		Action-adventure, Platformer			
July 14	God of War III Remastered	PS4		Action-adventure, Hack and slash			
July 14	Godzilla: The Game	PS3, PS4		Action-adventure, Fighting			
July 14	Prototype Biohazard Bundle	PS4		Action-adventure			
July 14	Rory McIlroy PGA Tour	PS4, XBO		Sports			
July 15	This War of Mine	iOS, DROID		Survival			
July 15	The Vanishing of Ethan Carter	PS4		Adventure			
July 16	Sorcerer King	WIN					
July 21	Breach and Clear: Deadline	WIN, OSX, LIN					
July 21	Game of Thrones: Episode 5 - A Nest of Vipers	WIN, OSX, PS3, PS4		Graphic adventure, Interactive film			
July 21	Hatoful Boyfriend	PS4, PSV		Otome, Dating sim			
July 21	Journey	PS4		Adventure, Art			
July 21	Onechanbara Z2: Chaos	PS4		Hack and slash, Horror			
July 21	Phantom Breaker: Battle Grounds Overdrive	PS4		Brawler			
July 21	Q.U.B.E: Director's Cut	PS3, PS4		Puzzle			
July 21	Star Wars Knights of the Old Republic II: The Sith Lords	OSX, LIN		RPG			
July 21	Tembo the Badass Elephant	WIN, PS4, XBO		Platformer			
July 21	TIS-100	WIN		Puzzle, Programming			
July 22	Game of Thrones: Episode 5 - A Nest of Vipers	XB360, XBO		Graphic adventure, Interactive film			
July 23	The Binding of Isaac: Rebirth	XBO, 3DS, WiiU		Roguelike			
July 23	Bleach: Brave Souls (JP)	iOS, DROID		Brawler			
July 23	Five Nights at Freddy's 4	WIN		Survival horror			
July 23	Game of Thrones: Episode 5 - A Nest of Vipers	iOS, DROID		Graphic adventure, Interactive film			
July 23	Langrisser Re:Incarnation -Tensei- (JP)	3DS					
July 23	Makai Shin Trillion (JP)	PSV					
July 23	Way of the Samurai 4	WIN		Action-adventure			
July 24	Victor Vran	WIN, OSX, LIN		Action RPG			
July 25	Prune	iOS		Puzzle			
July 28	Abyss Odyssey: Extended Dream Edition	PS4		Roguelike, Action-adventure			
July 28	BlazBlue: Chrono Phantasma Extend	PSV		Fighting			
July 28	King's Quest: Chapter I - A Knight to Remember	WIN, PS3, PS4		Adventure			
July 28	Legend of Kay HD	WIN, OSX, PS3, PS4, WiiU, XB360		Action-adventure, Platformer			
July 28	Life Is Strange: Episode 4 - Dark Room	WIN, PS3, PS4, XB360, XBO		Graphic adventure			
July 28	Lost Dimension	PS3, PSV		Tactical RPG			
July 28	N++	PS4		Platformer			
July 28	The Swindle	PS3, PS4, PSV					
July 28	Sword Art Online Re:Hollow Fragment	PS4		RPG			
July 28	World of Tanks	XBO		Vehicular combat, MMO			
July 29	Candy Crush Saga	WIN		Puzzle			
July 29	King's Quest: Chapter I - A Knight to Remember	XB360, XBO		Adventure			
July 29	Microsoft Solitaire Collection	WIN					
July 30	Angry Birds 2	iOS, DROID		Puzzle			
July 30	Animal Crossing: Happy Home Designer (JP)	3DS		Sandbox			
July 30	Badland: Game of the Year Edition	WiiU		Adventure			
July 30	Date A Live Twin Edition: Rio Reincarnation (JP)	PSV					
July 30	IA/VT Colorful (JP)	PSV					
July 30	Ray Gigant (JP)	PSV					
July 30	Xeodrifter	WiiU		Metroidvania			
July 30	Yu-Gi-Oh! Legacy of the Duelist	PS4, XBO					
August 3	Freedom Planet	WiiU		Action, Platformer			
August 3	Nom Nom Galaxy	WIN, OSX					
August 4	Beyond Eyes	XBO		Adventure			
August 4	Devil's Third (JP)	WiiU					
August 4	Etrian Odyssey 2 Untold: The Fafnir Knight	3DS		RPG, Dungeon crawl			
August 4	Fairy Fencer F	WIN		RPG			
August 4	Galak-Z: The Dimensional	PS4		Shooter, Roguelike			
August 4	Rare Replay	XBO		—N/a			
August 6	Gal*Gun: Double Peace (JP)	PSV					
August 6	Luminous Arc Infinity (JP)	PSV					
August 7	The Swindle	XBO					
August 11	Brave Tank Hero	3DS, WiiU					
August 11	Everybody's Gone to the Rapture	PS4		Adventure			
August 11	Garfield Kart	3DS					
August 11	Gauntlet: Slayer Edition	PS4		Dungeon crawl			
August 11	Goat Simulator	PS3, PS4		Action			
August 11	OlliOlli 2: Welcome to Olliwood	WIN		Sports			
August 11	Paddington: Adventures in London	3DS					
August 11	Toy Soldiers: War Chest	WIN, XBO		Action, Strategy			
August 11	Xblaze Lost: Memories	PS3, PSV		Visual novel			
August 12	Brothers: A Tale of Two Sons	PS4, XBO		Adventure			
August 12	RollerCoaster Tycoon 3	iOS		CMS			
August 12	Sentris	WIN		Music			
August 12	Toy Soldiers: War Chest	PS4		Action, Strategy			
August 13	Fallout Shelter	DROID		CMS			
August 13	Rebuild: Gangs of Deadsville	iOS, DROID					
August 14	Super Mega Baseball: Extra Innings	XBO		Sports			
August 18	Curses N Chaos	WIN, PS4, PSV					
August 18	Dungeon Travelers 2: The Royal Library & the Monster Seal	PSV		Dungeon crawl, RPG			
August 18	Final Fantasy Type-0 HD	WIN		Action RPG			
August 18	Resident Evil: Revelations 2	PSV		Survival horror			
August 18	Tales from the Borderlands: Episode 4 - Escape Plan Bravo	WIN, OSX, PS3, PS4		Graphic adventure			
August 18	Volume	WIN, OSX, PS4, PSV		Stealth			
August 18	Zombi	WIN, PS4, XBO		Survival horror			
August 19	Dream Runners	PS4		Platformer			
August 19	Smite	XBO		MOBA			
August 19	Tales from the Borderlands: Episode 4 - Escape Plan Bravo	XB360, XBO		Graphic adventure			
August 19	Velocity 2X	WIN, OSX, LIN, XBO		Shoot 'em up, Puzzle			
August 20	DiscStorm	WIN					
August 20	Final Fantasy VII	iOS		RPG			
August 20	Tales from the Borderlands: Episode 4 - Escape Plan Bravo	iOS, DROID		Graphic adventure			
August 20	Trine 3: The Artifacts of Power	WIN		Puzzle-platformer, Action-adventure			
August 20	Woah Dave!	WiiU		Platformer			
August 21	The Flock	WIN		Survival horror			
August 21	Little Battlers eXperience: Baku Boost	3DS					
August 21	Risen 3: Titan Lords Enhanced Edition	PS4		Action RPG			
August 21	Super Mega Baseball: Extra Innings	WIN		Sports			
August 23	LandFort	DROID					
August 24	Flywrench	WIN, OSX, LIN		Action			
August 24	Grandia 2 Anniversary Edition	WIN		RPG			
August 25	Amnesia: Memories	PSV		Visual novel			
August 25	Asker	WIN		MMORPG	Neowiz	Pmang	
August 25	Back to Bed	PS3, PS4, PSV					
August 25	Dishonored: Definitive Edition	PS4, XBO		Action-adventure, Stealth			
August 25	Evoland 2	WIN		Action-adventure, RPG			
August 25	Gears of War: Ultimate Edition	XBO		TPS			
August 25	I Am Bread	PS4		Action-adventure, Simulation			
August 25	Madden NFL 16	PS3, PS4, XB360, XBO		Sports			
August 25	Mega Man Legacy Collection	WIN, PS4, XBO					
August 25	Nova-111	WIN, PS3, PS4, PSV					
August 25	One Piece: Pirate Warriors 3	WIN, PS4, PS3, PSV		Action-adventure, Brawler			
August 25	Shadowrun: Hong Kong	WIN, OSX, LIN		Tactical RPG			
August 25	Steins;Gate	PS3, PSV		Visual novel			
August 25	Until Dawn	PS4	Original	Interactive film			
August 26	Don't Starve: Giant Edition	XBO		Survival			
August 26	Octodad: Dadliest Catch	XBO		Adventure			
August 27	Dragon Quest VIII: Journey of the Cursed King (JP)	3DS					
August 27	Dragon's Dogma Online (JP)	PS3, PS4					
August 27	Lara Croft Go	iOS, DROID, WP		Puzzle			
August 28	BioShock	iOS		FPS			
August 28	Nova-111	XBO					
August 28	Satellite Reign	WIN, OSX, LIN		Tactical RPG, RTT			
August 28	Stray Cat Crossing	WIN					
August 30	Disney Infinity 3.0	WIN, PS4, PS3, XB360, XBO, WiiU, iOS, DROID		Action-adventure			
September 1	Armello	WIN, OSX, LIN, PS4		RPG, Digital tabletop			
September 1	Danganronpa Another Episode: Ultra Despair Girls	PSV		Action-adventure			
September 1	Grow Home	PS4		Adventure, Platformer			
September 1	Mad Max	WIN, LIN, PS4, XBO		Action-adventure, Vehicular combat			
September 1	Metal Gear Solid V: The Phantom Pain	WIN, PS3, PS4, XB360, XBO		Action-adventure, Stealth			
September 1	Nobunaga's Ambition: Sphere of Influence	WIN, PS3, PS4		Wargame, TBS, Tactical RPG			
September 1	Pokémon Shuffle	iOS, DROID		Puzzle			
September 1	Super Time Force Ultra	PS4, PSV		Action, Adventure, Shooter			
September 1	Xeodrifter	PS4, PSV		Metroidvania			
September 2	Act of Aggression	WIN		RTS			
September 3	Gunman Clive 2	WIN					
September 4	Broken Sword 5: The Serpent's Curse	PS4, XBO		PCA			
September 4	Super Toy Cars	XBO					
September 8	Hatsune Miku: Project Mirai DX	3DS		Rhythm			
September 8	Tearaway Unfolded	PS4		Platformer, Adventure			
September 8	Warhammer 40,000: Regicide	WIN		Strategy			
September 9	Castle Crashers Remastered	XB360, XBO		Brawler, RPG, Action			
September 9	Lovers in a Dangerous Spacetime	WIN, OSX, LIN, XBO		Action, Platformer			
September 9	Star Wars: Uprising	iOS, DROID		Action RPG			
September 10	Cross of the Dutchman	WIN, OSX, LIN					
September 10	Monster Hunter Diary: Poka Poka Airou Village DX (JP)	3DS					
September 11	Leo's Fortune	XBO		Puzzle			
September 11	Super Mario Maker	WiiU		Platformer			
September 15	Forza Motorsport 6	XBO		Racing			
September 15	NHL 16	PS4, XBO		Sports			
September 15	NHL Legacy Edition	PS3, XB360		Sports			
September 15	Pro Evolution Soccer 2016	WIN, PS3, PS4		Sports			
September 15	Senran Kagura 2: Deep Crimson	3DS					
September 15	Undertale	WIN, OSX		RPG			
September 17	Pokémon Super Mystery Dungeon	3DS		Roguelike			
September 17	World of Warships	WIN		MMO, Vehicular combat, TPS			
September 17	Year Walk	WiiU		Adventure			
September 20	Skylanders: SuperChargers	PS3, PS4, XB360, XBO, Wii, WiiU, 3DS, iOS		RPG, Platformer, Racing			
September 22	Blood Bowl 2	WIN, PS4, XBO		Sports, TBS			
September 22	FIFA 16	WIN, PS3, PS4, XB360, XBO, iOS, DROID		Sports			
September 22	Laserlife	WIN, OSX, PS4					
September 22	Soma	WIN, OSX, LIN, PS4, XBO		Survival horror			
September 23	Assault Android Cactus	WIN, OSX, LIN					
September 23	Concrete Jungle	WIN		City builder			
September 23	A Fistful of Gun	WIN		Shoot 'em up			
September 24	Else Heart. Break()	WIN, OSX, LIN		Adventure			
September 24	PewDiePie: Legend of the Brofist	iOS, DROID		Action-adventure, Platformer			
September 24	Utawarerumono: Itsuwari no Kamen (JP)	PSV, PS4					
September 25	Animal Crossing: Happy Home Designer	3DS		Sandbox			
September 25	Grand Ages: Medieval	WIN		City builder, RTS			
September 27	Lego Dimensions	PS3, PS4, XB360, XBO, WiiU		Action-adventure			
September 28	NBA Live 16	PS4, XBO		Sports			
September 29	80 Days	WIN		Interactive fiction			
September 29	Jotun	WIN		Action-adventure			
September 29	Might & Magic Heroes VII	WIN		TBS			
September 29	NBA 2K16	WIN, PS3, PS4, XB360, XBO		Sports			
September 29	Persona 4: Dancing All Night	PSV		Rhythm			
September 29	Samurai Warriors 4-II	WIN, PS3, PS4, PSV		Hack and slash			
September 29	Tony Hawk's Pro Skater 5	PS4, XBO		Sports			
September 29	Toto Temple Deluxe	WIN, PS4					
September 30	Armikrog	WIN, OSX, LIN		PCA			
September 30	The Escapists: The Walking Dead	WIN, XBO		Strategy, RPG			
September 30	Need for Speed: No Limits	iOS, DROID		Racing			
September 30	Tokyo Xanadu (JP)	PSV					

=== October–December ===
Release date	Title	Platform	Type	Genre	Developer	Publisher	Ref.
October 1	The Beginner's Guide	WIN, OSX		Interactive drama			
October 1	Lost Horizon 2	WIN		Adventure			
October 1	Yoru no Nai Kuni (JP)	PSV, PS4					
October 6	2064: Read Only Memories	WIN, OSX, LIN		Graphic adventure			
October 6	Dengeki Bunko: Fighting Climax	PS3, PSV		Fighting			
October 6	Disgaea 5: Alliance of Vengeance	PS4		Tactical RPG			
October 6	Elite: Dangerous	XBO		Vehicle sim (spaceship)			
October 6	Prison Architect	WIN, OSX, LIN		CMS			
October 6	Rock Band 4	PS4, XBO		Rhythm			
October 6	Saint Seiya: Soldiers' Soul	PS3, PS4		Fighting			
October 6	Super Meat Boy	PS4, PSV		Platformer			
October 6	Transformers: Devastation	WIN, PS4, PS3, XB360, XBO		Action, Hack and slash			
October 8	Keep Talking and Nobody Explodes	WIN		Puzzle			
October 8	MeiQ no Chika ni Shisu (JP)	PSV					
October 9	Chibi-Robo! Zip Lash	3DS		Platformer, Adventure			
October 9	Uncharted: The Nathan Drake Collection	PS4		Action-adventure, TPS, Platformer			
October 10	Angels Fall First	WIN		FPS			
October 13	Corpse Party: Blood Drive	PSV		Survival horror			
October 13	Dragon Quest Heroes: The World Tree's Woe and the Blight Below	PS4		Hack and slash			
October 13	The Jackbox Party Pack 2	WIN, PS3, PS4, XBO		Party	Jackbox Games	Jackbox Games	
October 13	The Legend of Legacy	3DS		RPG			
October 13	Minecraft: Story Mode: Episode 1 — The Order of the Stone	WIN, PS3, PS4, XB360, XBO		Graphic adventure			
October 13	Secret Ponchos	WIN		Shoot 'em up			
October 13	The Talos Principle: Deluxe Edition	PS4		Puzzle			
October 13	Wasteland 2: Director's Cut	WIN, OSX, LIN, PS4, XBO		RPG			
October 14	The Age of Decadence	WIN		RPG			
October 15	7th Dragon III Code:Ved (JP)	3DS					
October 15	Broforce	WIN, OSX, LIN		Run and gun			
October 15	Downwell	WIN, iOS, DROID		Scrolling shooter (vertical), Roguelike, Platformer			
October 15	Minecraft: Story Mode: Episode 1 — The Order of the Stone	iOS, DROID		Graphic adventure			
October 15	Mushroom 11	WIN		Puzzle-platformer			
October 16	WRC 5: FIA World Rally Championship	WIN, PS3, PS4, PSV, XB360, XBO		Racing			
October 16	Yoshi's Woolly World	WiiU		Platformer			
October 20	Adventure Time: Finn & Jake Investigations	WIN, PS3, PS4, XB360, XBO, WiiU, 3DS		Action-adventure, RPG			
October 20	Code: Realize ~Guardian of Rebirth~	PSV		Visual novel			
October 20	Dragon Ball Z: Extreme Butōden	3DS		Fighting			
October 20	Gravity Falls: Legend of the Gnome Gemulets	3DS		Platformer			
October 20	Guitar Hero Live	PS4, PS3, XB360, XBO, WiiU		Rhythm			
October 20	Just Dance 2016	PS3, PS4, XB360, XBO, WiiU, Wii		Music, Rhythm			
October 20	Just Dance Unlimited	PS4, XBO, WiiU		Music, Rhythm			
October 20	Life Is Strange: Episode 5 — Polarized	WIN, PS3, PS4, XB360, XBO		Graphic adventure			
October 20	Overlord: Fellowship of Evil	WIN, PS4, XBO		Action RPG			
October 20	Primal Carnage: Extinction	PS4		FPS			
October 20	Rebel Galaxy	WIN		Vehicle sim (plane)			
October 20	Sword Coast Legends	WIN, OSX, LIN		Action RPG			
October 20	Tales from the Borderlands: Episode 5 — The Vault of the Traveler	WIN, PS3, PS4		Graphic adventure			
October 20	Tales of Zestiria	WIN, PS3, PS4		RPG			
October 21	Kingdom	WIN					
October 21	PixelJunk Shooter Ultimate	WIN		Shoot 'em up			
October 21	Tales from the Borderlands: Episode 5 — The Vault of the Traveler	XB360, XBO		Graphic adventure			
October 22	Brothers: A Tale of Two Sons	iOS		Adventure			
October 22	Fatal Frame: Maiden of Black Water	WiiU		Survival horror			
October 22	Grand Kingdom (JP)	PSV, PS4					
October 22	Mugen Souls	WIN		RPG			
October 22	Tales from the Borderlands: Episode 5 — The Vault of the Traveler	iOS, DROID		Graphic adventure			
October 23	Assassin's Creed Syndicate	PS4, XBO		Action-adventure, Stealth			
October 23	Giana Sisters 2D	WIN		Puzzle-platformer			
October 23	Guild Wars 2: Heart of Thorns	WIN, OSX		MMO, RPG			
October 23	The Legend of Zelda: Tri Force Heroes	3DS		Action-adventure			
October 23	Warhammer: End Times - Vermintide	WIN		FPS, Action			
October 26	Chaos Reborn	WIN		Tactical RPG			
October 26	Miracle Fly	WIN, OSX		Puzzle-platformer, Action-adventure			
October 27	Darksiders II: Deathinitive Edition	PS4, XBO		Action RPG, Hack and slash			
October 27	Divinity: Original Sin Enhanced Edition	WIN, OSX, LIN, PS4, XBO		RPG			
October 27	Halo 5: Guardians	XBO		FPS			
October 27	Minecraft: Story Mode: Episode 2 — Assembly Required	WIN, PS3, PS4, XB360, XBO, iOS, DROID		Graphic adventure			
October 27	MX vs. ATV Supercross Encore	WIN, PS4, XBO		Racing			
October 27	The Park	WIN		Horror (psych)			
October 27	WWE 2K16	PS3, PS4, XB360, XBO		Sports			
October 28	Alien: Isolation – The Collection	OSX, LIN		Action-adventure, Stealth, Survival horror			
October 29	Galak-Z: The Dimensional	WIN		Shooter, Roguelike			
October 29	God Eater Resurrection (JP)	PSV					
October 29	Human Resource Machine	WIN, WiiU		Puzzle			
October 29	The Legend of Heroes: Trails in the Sky SC	WIN		RPG			
October 29	Octodad: Dadliest Catch	iOS, WiiU		Adventure			
October 29	Yomawari (JP)	PSV					
October 30	Hyperdimension Neptunia Re;Birth3: V Generation	WIN		RPG			
November 2	Sonic Lost World	WIN		Platformer			
November 3	Anno 2205	WIN		City builder, RTS			
November 3	Dragon Fin Soup	WIN, OSX, LIN, PS3, PS4, PSV		Roguelike, Action RPG			
November 3	The Jackbox Party Pack	X360	Port	Party	Jackbox Games	Telltale Games	
November 3	Need for Speed	PS4, XBO		Racing			
November 3	Norn9: Var Commons	PSV		Otome			
November 5	Mushihimesama	WIN		Scrolling shooter (vertical), Bullet hell			
November 5	The Room Three	iOS		Puzzle			
November 6	Call of Duty: Black Ops III	WIN, PS3, PS4, XB360, XBO	Original	FPS			
November 6	The Peanuts Movie: Snoopy's Grand Adventure	PS4, 3DS, WiiU, XB360, XBO		Platformer			
November 6	Yo-Kai Watch	3DS		RPG			
November 10	Fallout 4	WIN, PS4, XBO		Action RPG			
November 10	Nintendo Badge Arcade	3DS					
November 10	Rise of the Tomb Raider	XB360, XBO	Original	Action-adventure			
November 10	Rodea the Sky Soldier	3DS, Wii, WiiU		Action-adventure			
November 10	StarCraft II: Legacy of the Void	WIN, OSX		RTS			
November 10	Superbeat: Xonic	PSV		Music, Rhythm			
November 12	Project X Zone 2: Brave New World (JP)	3DS					
November 13	Animal Crossing: Amiibo Festival	WiiU		Party			
November 13	Back to the Future: The Game	PS4, XB360, XBO		Graphic adventure			
November 13	Football Manager 2016	WIN, OSX, LIN		Sports, Business sim			
November 13	Sword Art Online: Lost Song	PS4, PSV		Action RPG			
November 17	The Crew: Wild Run	WIN, PS4, XBO		Racing			
November 17	Game of Thrones: Episode 6 — The Ice Dragon	WIN, PS3, PS4, XB360, XBO		Graphic adventure			
November 17	Star Wars: Battlefront	WIN, PS4, XBO		FPS, TPS			
November 17	Stella Glow	3DS		Tactical RPG			
November 18	Deadpool	PS4, XBO		Action-adventure			
November 18	Hard West	WIN					
November 19	Airship Q (JP)	PSV					
November 19	Assassin's Creed Syndicate	WIN		Action-adventure, Stealth			
November 19	Atelier Sophie (JP)	PSV					
November 19	Mordheim: City of the Damned	WIN					
November 19	Omega Labyrinth (JP)	PSV					
November 19	Steins;Gate 0 (JP)	PSV, PS4					
November 20	Mario Tennis: Ultra Smash	WiiU		Sports			
November 20	Pokémon Super Mystery Dungeon	3DS		Roguelike			
November 24	Beyond: Two Souls	PS4		Interactive film, Action-adventure			
November 24	Minecraft: Story Mode: Episode 3 — The Last Place You Look	WIN, PS3, PS4, XB360, XBO, iOS, DROID		Graphic adventure			
November 24	Star Wars: Galaxy of Heroes	iOS, DROID		RPG			
November 24	Teslagrad	PSV		Puzzle-platformer			
November 25	Strania -The Stella Machina-	WIN					
November 26	Criminal Girls 2 (JP)	PSV					
November 26	Exist Archive: The Other Side of the Sky (JP)	PSV, PS4					
November 26	Kancolle Kai (JP)	PSV					
November 26	Net High (JP)	PSV					
November 26	Saint Seiya: Soldiers' Soul	WIN		Fighting			
November 28	Monster Hunter X (JP)	3DS					
December 1	Chivalry: Medieval Warfare	PS4, XBO		Hack and slash			
December 1	Eastside Hockey Manager	WIN					
December 1	FIM Speedway Grand Prix 15	WIN					
December 1	Just Cause 3	WIN, PS4, XBO		Action-adventure			
December 1	Kung Fu Panda: Showdown of Legendary Legends	WIN, PS3, PS4, 3DS, WiiU, XB360, XBO		Fighting			
December 1	Tom Clancy's Rainbow Six Siege	WIN, PS4, XBO		Tactical shooter			
December 2	Valhalla Hills	WIN					
December 3	Dariusburst Chronicle Saviours	WIN		Scrolling shooter (horizontal)			
December 3	Dragon Quest Heroes: Digital Slime Edition	WIN		Hack and slash			
December 3	Dreamfall Chapters: Book Four — Revelations	WIN, OSX, LIN		Adventure			
December 3	Pokémon Picross	3DS					
December 3	Rayman Adventures	iOS, DROID		Platformer			
December 3	Shadow Complex Remastered	WIN		Metroidvania			
December 4	Dr. Langeskov, The Tiger, and The Terribly Cursed Emerald: A Whirlwind Heist	WIN		Adventure			
December 4	War of the Monsters	PS4		Action, Fighting			
December 4	Xenoblade Chronicles X	WiiU		Action RPG			
December 5	Bastion	PSV		Action RPG			
December 5	Fat Princess Adventures	PS4		Action RPG			
December 5	Final Fantasy VII	PS4		RPG			
December 5	Nuclear Throne	WIN, OSX, LIN, PS4, PSV		Shoot 'em up, Roguelike			
December 7	Dirt Rally	WIN		Racing (sim)			
December 7	Helldivers	WIN		Shoot 'em up			
December 7	Zombie Vikings	WIN					
December 8	Ben and Ed	WIN					
December 8	Earth Defense Force 2: Invaders from Planet Space	PSV		TPS			
December 8	Earth Defense Force 4.1: The Shadow of New Despair	PS4		TPS			
December 8	Yakuza 5	PS3		Action-adventure			
December 10	Among the Sleep	PS4		Survival horror, Action-adventure			
December 10	Guilty Gear Xrd -SIGN-	WIN		Fighting			
December 10	Lightning Returns: Final Fantasy XIII	WIN		Action RPG			
December 10	Magic: The Gathering – Puzzle Quest	iOS, DROID					
December 10	PewDiePie: Legend of the Brofist	WIN, OSX		Action-adventure, Platformer			
December 10	SteamWorld Heist	3DS		Platformer, Action-adventure, Metroidvania			
December 10	Terraria	3DS		Action-adventure, Sandbox			
December 11	Devil's Third	WiiU		Action-adventure, Hack and slash, Shooter			
December 15	Hatoful Boyfriend: Holiday Star	WIN, OSX, LIN		Otome, Dating sim			
December 15	King's Quest: Chapter 2 — Rubble Without a Cause	PS3, PS4		Adventure			
December 15	Rusty Lake Hotel	WIN, iOS, DROID		Puzzle			
December 16	Final Fantasy VI	WIN		RPG			
December 16	King's Quest: Chapter 2 — Rubble Without a Cause	WIN, XB360, XBO		Adventure			
December 17	Grand Theft Auto: Liberty City Stories Mobile	iOS		Action-adventure			
December 17	Minecraft	WiiU		Sandbox, Survival			
December 17	Scribblenauts Unlimited	iOS, DROID		Puzzle, Sandbox			
December 18	The Escapists	XB360		Strategy, RPG			
December 18	Underrail	WIN		RPG			
December 21	Saints Row IV	LIN		Action-adventure			
December 21	Saints Row: Gat out of Hell	LIN		Action-adventure			
December 22	Hatoful Boyfriend: Holiday Star	PS4, PSV		Otome, Dating sim			
December 22	The Legend of Heroes: Trails of Cold Steel	PS3, PSV		RPG			
December 22	Minecraft: Story Mode: Episode 4 — A Block and a Hard Place	WIN, PS3, PS4, XB360, XBO, iOS, DROID		Graphic adventure			
December 22	Trine 3: The Artifacts of Power	PS4		Puzzle-platformer, Action-adventure			
