= Convoy (disambiguation) =

A convoy is a group of vehicles traveling together for mutual support.

Convoy may also refer to:

== Places ==
- Convoy, County Donegal, a village in the Republic of Ireland
- Convoy, Ohio, a village in the United States

== Film and television ==
- Convoy (1927 film), an American silent film starring Lowell Sherman
- Convoy (1940 film), a British film directed by Pen Tennyson
- Convoy (1978 film), a film by Sam Peckinpah and Kris Kristofferson, inspired by the C. W. McCall song of the same name
- Convoy (TV series), a 1965 television series starring John Gavin

== Music ==
- Convoy (band), a southern Californian rock music band
- "Convoy" (song), a 1975 trucker's song by C. W. McCall

== Other uses ==
- Convoy, a character from the Vigilante 8 video games
- LDV Convoy, a cargo/passenger van manufactured by LDV
- Lock convoy, a performance problem that can occur when using locks for concurrency control in a multithreaded application
- Convoy (company), a Seattle-based trucking startup
- Convoy (video game), an indie video game
- The Japanese name of the Transformers character Optimus Prime
- Convoy protests in Canada in 2022
