= MeiQ: Labyrinth of Death =

2015 video game

- Developer: Compile Heart
- Publisher: Idea Factory
- Director: Tomoki Tauchi
- Producers: Norihisa Kochiwa; Naoko Mizuno; Makoto Kitano
- Designers: Ryoji; Hidetaka Tenjin
- Composers: Tenpei Sato; Satoshi Kadokura
- Series: Makai Ichiban Kan
- Platform: PlayStation Vita
- Release: JP: December 17, 2015; NA: September 13, 2016; EU: September 16, 2016
- Genres: Dungeon crawler, role-playing
- Mode: Single-player

MeiQ: Labyrinth of Death, known as Death Under the Labyrinth (メイQノ地下ニ死ス, MeiQ no Chika ni Shisu) in Japan, is a dungeon crawler role-playing video game for the PlayStation Vita developed by Compile Heart and published by Idea Factory. It is the second game in the Makai Ichiban Kan series of games. In MeiQ: Labyrinth of Death, the protagonist Estra must conquer dungeons to save the world from eternal darkness whilst defeating monsters and enemies. The game was released on December 17, 2015, in Japan, September 13, 2016, in North America, and September 16, 2016, in Europe by Idea Factory International.

== Premise ==
MeiQ: Labyrinth of Death is set in a world where the stars in the sky have stopped rotating, shrouding it in darkness. Protagonist Estra, a Makaishi ("demon machine soldier girl"), must band together with four other chosen Makaishi and robotic Guardians to conquer four towers with Protector Gods in them, so that they may wind back up the Celestial Screw which rotates the stars. The Makaishi are descendants of the stars and have an ability to utilize mysterious "demon machine arts", each with their own preferred element. The five Makaishi of MeiQ: Labyrinth of Death are:

- Estra, the main protagonist. She is both curious and a girl who takes action. Her element is Earth.
- Flare, a prideful and belligerent girl. She is strong, confident, trigger-happy and proud, and a rival to Estra. Her element is Fire.
- Connie, a naive and innocent girl. Her element is Wood.
- Maki, a calm and collected honours student. She often acts as wise older sister-like character to Estra. Her element is Gold.
- Setia, a shy bookworm with a trademark umbrella. Setia lacks confidence and often has a negative attitude. Her element is Water.

Other characters include the three dark Saneishu ("shadow people") and the Meitakiryuu ("mysterious dragon"). The main antagonists of MeiQ: Labyrinth of Death are:

- Gagarin, a Makaishi who lost his way and has since turned to darkness. He is the primary antagonist and leader of the three Saneishu.
  - Glen of Flame, the greatest of the three Saneishu with the Fire attribute. He is a perfectionist who is sarcastic, stubborn, yet polite.
  - Gordon of Metal, a Saneishu with the Gold attribute. Gordon is a rough and impulsive muscular giant.
  - Aria of Water, a Saneishu with the Water attribute. She has a queen-like demeanour and always wears a smile.
- Pamela, a thief who is like an older sister with a weakness for gems, money, and other precious metals.
  - Ganz, Pamela's subordinate who is often yelled at by her.

== Gameplay ==
Players form parties composing of three characters (or mages) and three Guardians to take on dungeons; this is later expanded to four characters and four Guardians in the game's latter stages. Guardians can be customised to a variety of different configurations, which affects their overall strength. The body, arm parts, and core of a Guardian can be altered to increase its attack strength, defence, and health points, as well as granting them new skills. There are a total of ten Guardians to choose from. Meanwhile, characters (mages) are customised with "Astral Seeds", which grant them stat boosts. This includes being able to analyse monsters more effectively as well as strengthened defence. The game contains a "Form Change" feature which allows players to change into four different forms, plus their default form. A "Demon Stone" system allows the player to remember special skills and enhance their abilities. At the "Star Wing Inn", players rest their characters and customize them.

MeiQ: Labyrinth of Death uses a "Dual Battle" gameplay system where each character (mage) is paired to a Guardian. Battles are turn-based and the game contains several different dungeons, each with different monsters, elements, and traps called "Gimmicks". Characters (mages) are primarily offensive and Guardians are primarily defensive; only characters can use items or heal, whilst Guardians have a great deal more health points. The game is lost when the characters die. The player can continually change the difficulty level of dungeons whilst playing. As players and enemies each have elements, players seek to exploit their elemental strengths and find their enemies' elemental weaknesses. There are a total of six different elements in the game, including wood, fire, water, earth and gold; this was compared to the Pokémon games by Operation Rainfall. Players can speed up battles through pressing a button; this is to make MeiQ: Labyrinth of Death feel less like a grind. North American and European versions of the game have PlayStation TV support.

== Development ==
As a dungeon RPG, we're tailoring this to be top class in terms of difficulty. [...] The battles are hard and the dungeons themselves have mysterious aspects to them that ratchet things up, too. In essence, you could say it'll feel something not unlike something from a Metal Max game.

— Tomoki Tauchi, director

A teaser website for the game was launched by Compile Heart on February 18, 2015, with a countdown timer of seven days. MeiQ: Labyrinth of Death itself was announced on the February 24th issue of Dengeki PlayStation, where it was revealed to be the second entry in the Makai Ichiban Kan series of video games. Additional information was also released on March 26. On March 18, the first teaser trailer was released. MeiQ: Labyrinth of Death's first full gameplay trailer was released on October 7. The game is produced by Norihisa Kochiwa, Naoko Mizuno, and Makoto Kitano; directed by Tomoki Tauchi, with sound by Tenpei Sato and Satoshi Kadokura. Ryoji designed the characters whilst mecha artist Hidetaka Tenjin designed the guardians. The developers stated that the game was deliberately designed to be difficult, and not dissimilar to a Metal Max game.

On June 23, the release date for MeiQ: Labyrinth of Death was originally set as October 8, 2015. However, on December 9, the game was delayed to December 17, with Compile Heart citing "various reasons". Players who pre-order get an additional "Trillion Form" for use in-game, as part of a collaboration with Trillion: God of Destruction, another Compile Heart game. The game's opening theme song is "Ryuusei no Ribbon" by Kanaha Mori, with lyrics by Midori Ide and composition by Tenpei Sato; its ending theme, "Starry Night", is sung by Serena Tanaka, with lyrics by Ar†cana and composition also by Tenpei Sato.

On May 9, 2016, it was announced that Idea Factory International is bringing the game to North American and European English-speaking territories under the name MeiQ: Labyrinth of Death (as opposed to its Japanese title, Death Under the Labyrinth.) The game was released both physically and digitally on September 13 in North America and September 16 in Europe; however, it was refused classification in Australia as Australian censors believed that there is a character who appears underage being depicted in a sexualized manner (namely Connie).

== Reception ==
MeiQ: Labyrinth of Death has received generally mixed reviews. Four Famitsu reviewers awarded MeiQ: Labyrinth of Death scores of 8, 7, 7 and 7, for a final score of 29/40. CJ Andriessen of Destructoid criticised the game's simplistic gameplay and relative lack of customisation, writing "MeiQ: Labyrinth of Death isn't a bad game, it's half-assed. There are a couple of interesting ideas here that, applied to a competent dungeon crawler, could have made for something great"; however, he then noted that "but at the end of every complaint, of every issue I have found, is the same five-word phrase: But I'm still having fun". A final score of 6/10 was given. Similarly, Just Push Start praised the game's "dual audio" and "cute girls", yet complained about the game's graphics and simple gameplay, for a final score of 5/10.

Reception

Aggregate score
Aggregator	Score
Metacritic	56/100

Review scores
Publication	Score
Destructoid	6/10
Famitsu	29/40
Push Square	4/10
