= Primal Carnage: Genesis =

Cancelled video game

- Developer: Lukewarm Media
- Publisher: Lukewarm Media
- Engine: Unreal Engine 4
- Platforms: Microsoft Windows; PlayStation 4
- Release: Cancelled
- Genre: First-person shooter
- Mode: Single-player

Primal Carnage: Genesis was a survival and first-person shooter game planned for the PlayStation 4 and Microsoft Windows. It was announced in March 2013 by developer Lukewarm Media, as a prequel to their 2012 asymmetrical multiplayer game Primal Carnage. Unlike the original game, Primal Carnage: Genesis would be a story-driven, single-player game divided into four episodes. It would be set on an island featured in the original game, and would explain the creation and subsequent escape of the island's genetically engineered dinosaurs.

The game was developed using Unreal Engine 4, and the first episode was scheduled for release in November 2013. However, development was put on hold around September 2013, due to disagreements within Lukewarm Media about the project's large scope and the direction of the Primal Carnage series. Circle 5 Studios subsequently took over the series and instead released Primal Carnage: Extinction, an update and sequel to the original game, in 2015.

== Story ==
Primal Carnage: Genesis would serve as a prequel to Primal Carnage, taking place on an island featured in the original game. The prequel would be story-driven and would focus on the island's genetically engineered dinosaurs, including their creation and subsequent escape. The player would take on the role of an unnamed staff member who travels to the island and later witnesses its descent into chaos as the dinosaurs escape. Rather than cinematic cutscenes, the storyline would gradually unfold through minimal information presented to the player, who would be left to deduce what is happening. Environmental changes, such as broken dinosaur fencing, would convey hints about the storyline, as would basic dialogue spoken by non-playable characters.

== Gameplay ==
Gameplay would differ significantly compared to Primal Carnage, which plays as an asymmetrical multiplayer game. Unlike the original game, Primal Carnage: Genesis would only feature a single-player mode. It was planned as a survival and first-person shooter game with puzzle-solving elements. Stealth and exploration would be necessary to get past certain areas where weapons would be ineffective or in low supply.

The game would be divided into four episodes, each one with two or three unique game features. One aspect of the game would have the player hack into security panels, by playing a mini-game using the touch pad of the PlayStation 4 controller. Enemies would include raptors, Triceratops, Kaprosuchus, and a Tyrannosaurus which would be encountered in a boss battle. The number of dinosaurs would increase with each episode. Locations on the island would include jungles, swamps, and valleys.

== Development ==
Lukewarm Media had considered releasing the original Primal Carnage for the PlayStation 3, but dropped such plans upon learning of the upcoming PlayStation 4, eventually deciding to release an entirely new game on the console. Lukewarm Media announced Primal Carnage: Genesis in March 2013. It was one of the first indie games to be announced for the PlayStation 4. A Microsoft Windows version was also expected.

The game was developed using Unreal Engine 4. Gameplay was inspired by games such as Trespasser, Dear Esther, and Far Cry 3. Lukewarm Media chose the episodic format in part because it allowed for each installment to end on a cliffhanger event. It would also allow suggested fan feedback, such as gameplay features or new dinosaurs, to be worked into subsequent episodes. Ashton Andersen, a co-founder of Lukewarm Media, also said that an episodic release would be cheaper for players and would help to avoid the possibility of them "regretting paying $60 for a game they got bored with or didn't get around to finishing".

The first episode had been scheduled for publication in November 2013, alongside the release of the PlayStation 4. However, there were disagreements within Lukewarm Media about the direction of the Primal Carnage series, with some deeming Genesis too large in scope for the company to handle. Development was put on hold around September 2013. Lukewarm Media publicly announced in May 2014 that the project was on the backburner while the company focused primarily on improving the original Primal Carnage game. By that point, Andersen had already left the company on bad terms to start his own development studio. Because of the split, he said that the rights to the Primal Carnage property were a complicated situation.

Circle 5 Studios subsequently took over the series. The company consisted of a modding community dedicated to the original 2012 game. The studio did not resume development of Primal Carnage: Genesis, viewing it as too ambitious for the team. Instead, Circle 5 completed the original game's update, which was released as Primal Carnage: Extinction in 2015. Development on Primal Carnage: Genesis remained on hold, with the company open to reviving the project if Extinction should prove to be successful. Genesis remains unreleased.
