= Orion: Prelude =

2012 video game

- Developer: Spiral Game Studios
- Publisher: Spiral Game Studios
- Engine: Unreal Engine 3
- Platform: Microsoft Windows
- Release: Orion: Dino Beatdown; May 4, 2012; Orion: Dino Horde; May 14, 2013; Orion: Prelude; August 25, 2014
- Genre: First-person shooter
- Modes: Single-player; Multiplayer

Orion: Prelude is a first-person shooter and online cooperative multiplayer game, developed and published by Spiral Game Studios for Microsoft Windows. In the game, armed players work together to defend generators against dinosaurs.

The game was conceived in 1998, by developer David Prassel, and was originally launched as a Half-Life 2 mod known as Orion: Source. Prassel formed Spiral in 2010 and announced plans to release the mod as a full game, to be known as Orion: Prelude. The game was eventually launched as Orion: Dino Beatdown in 2012, although it contained numerous glitches and was poorly received. In 2013, Spiral replaced it with a sequel known as Orion: Dino Horde, although players and media outlets viewed it as a minor update to the original game rather than a successor. In 2014, it was updated again and rebranded back to Orion: Prelude.

== Gameplay ==
Each iteration of Orion: Prelude is a first-person shooter with online cooperative multiplayer. The game pits armed humans against dinosaurs. Jetpacks and vehicles are a prominent feature.

Orion: Dino Beatdown supported up to five players who would be divided into character classes and must defend a generator base against incoming waves of dinosaurs. Generators must also be repaired if they take damage. Money, earned by killing the dinosaurs, could be used to buy upgrades. When players died, they would have to either pay to respawn immediately or wait for teammates to kill off remaining dinosaurs in the area. The game featured three enemies, including velociraptors, tyrannosaurs, and the flying pterosaur Rhamphorhynchus. A heads-up display was used to alert players of nearby enemies. The game featured vehicles with turrets, allowing one player to drive and another to shoot. In addition to multiplayer, the player could also choose to play solo.

Orion: Dino Horde introduced new features. It included seven maps, two of which were set at night. It had five game modes, including a solo mode, and one similar to capture the flag in which players collect dinosaur eggs and bring them to a base. The game had three character classes. As in the previous game, the primary objective was for players to defend and repair generators. New dinosaurs included Stegosaurus and Triceratops. When players began to kill a wave of dinosaurs, the animals would spread out across the level, forcing players to hunt them down. The game featured several upgradable weapons, such as assault rifles, pistols, and shotguns. Weapons and upgrades could be purchased during 60-second intervals in between each dinosaur wave. The game featured several vehicles, including cars, Jeeps equipped with turrets, mechs, and flying ships. Players could also take on the role of three different dinosaurs, viewed from a third-person perspective.

Orion: Prelude has the same dinosaurs and vehicles, as well as tanks and rocket sleds. Players defend a number of buildings in addition to generators. The game includes the ability to consume dead dinosaurs.

== Development and release ==
Developer David Prassel conceived the first design for the game in 1998. It underwent numerous changes over time, while retaining three core elements: dinosaurs, jetpacks, and vehicles. The project began as Orion: Source, a Half-Life 2 mod. In August 2010, Prassel and the mod team announced the formation of Spiral Game Studios, with the intention to publish the mod as a full game titled Orion: Prelude. It was expected to release the following year on Xbox Live Arcade, PlayStation Network, and Steam. Orion: Prelude was planned as the first game in a trilogy. Spiral, an independent game company, consisted of Prassel and a team of more than 20 game industry veterans. The company opened a page on Kickstarter seeking funds to complete the game, ultimately raising $17,686. Development was underway in 2011. Orion: Prelude was inspired by games such as Unreal Tournament 2004, as well as the Halo and Tribes series.

In February 2012, Spiral announced a new version of the game titled Orion: Dino Beatdown, to be released through Steam and OnLive. The planned home-console release was scrapped. Prior to the game's PC release, Prassel and Spiral fired several studio employees, who later alleged non-payment for their work on the game. Prassel said, "They were all fired for very serious reasons ranging anywhere from attempted blackmail all the way to attempted theft of hardware. They were not employed during a paid period (modding/start-up). They were not given paid tasks. Their work was not used".

The game's release was scheduled for March 2012, although this was delayed by a month. After another delay, Orion: Dino Beatdown was eventually released on May 4, 2012. It suffered from various glitches, and three patches were released within a few weeks to remedy the errors. Kickstarter contributors received a free copy of the game.

Spiral announced a sequel, Orion: Dino Horde, in February 2013. Players who purchased the previous game would receive the sequel for free, with Spiral stating, "This shouldn't even be a question on anyone's mind and we are extremely sorry about falling short on our first release". The sequel was released for beta testing on April 15, 2013, via Steam. It was fully launched on May 14, 2013, and Orion: Dino Beatdown became unavailable for purchase. Orion: Dino Horde was both a sequel and an update to the original game, featuring new netcode and updated animations.

The game was updated again on August 25, 2014, and retitled as Orion: Prelude once more. As of 2015, the game had received more than 60 updates, going back to its initial release in 2012. Spiral was subsequently renamed Trek Industries.

== Reception ==
=== Orion: Dino Beatdown ===
Reception

Aggregate score
| Aggregator | Score |
|---|---|
| Metacritic | 36/100 (Note: Orion: Dino Beatdown received a Metascore of 35 out of 100. Three additional reviews, for Orion: Dino Horde, bring the score to 36 out of 100, as Metacritic counts both games as one.) |

Review scores
| Publication | Score |
|---|---|
| GameSpy | (Dino Beatdown) |
| IGN | 2/10 (Dino Beatdown) |
| PC Gamer (US) | 10% (Dino Beatdown) |
| PC PowerPlay | 7/10 (Dino Beatdown) |
| Gameplanet | 2/10 (Dino Horde) |
| Multiplayer.it | 3/10 (Dino Beatdown) |
| Vandal | 3.5/10 (Dino Horde) |

Orion: Dino Beatdown was negatively received, particularly due to a large number of glitches. These included clipping, framerate issues, and problems joining a game server. The gameplay was also criticized, as were the minimal sound effects and instructions. Richard Cobbett of GameSpy still considered the game a "mess" despite the release of the first patch. He was critical of the artificial intelligence (AI) and opined that the game was lacking tension. Because of the glitches, Simone Tagliaferri of Multiplayer.it was unable to fully access the game until the third patch was released.

Eric Neigher of IGN called it "a broken, ugly looking, poorly designed mess of a game", and criticized the long respawn times: "This can take five or even ten minutes, depending on how early you die and how lucky your teammates get. Since a bug prevents you from observing other players there is literally nothing to do during this downtime other than stare at the ground". In mid-2012, IGN ranked it one of the worst games of the year up to that point. In a positive review, Daniel Hindes of PC PowerPlay praised it as "dumb entertainment" and called it "one of the simplest, stupidest and yet most awesome ideas for a rapid-fire, pick-up-and-play time-waster".

=== Subsequent versions ===
Orion: Dino Horde also received a negative reception, and reviewers noted a small number of online players. Media outlets and players noted similarities between the two games, viewing the sequel as merely an updated version of the original. According to Alice O'Connor of Shacknews, "While it's technically a sequel, Dino Horde sounds more like a revamp of Dino Beatdown, or even simply the game it was supposed to be all along". James Burnett of Gameplanet called it an unfinished and "lazy remake" of the original with few new features, stating that buyers could easily mistake the game for its predecessor. He concluded, "The embers of a decent co-operative multiplayer romp are there, buried beneath the comically 'animated' dinosaur attacks and wildly inconsistent AI". Jorge Cano of Vandal opined that it was a thoroughly bad game, though with a good concept. He was also critical of the AI and poor dinosaur animations, as well as numerous graphical glitches and repetitive music.

Steam users believed that the original game had merely been renamed, in an effort to avoid association with its poor Metacritic score. Prassel denied the allegation and stated that the game is both a sequel and an update with new features. Steam classified the game as an update to the original, rather than a standalone product. Metacritic transferred reviews from the original game to a new webpage dedicated to Orion: Dino Horde. On Steam, Prassel banned users and locked threads expressing negative thoughts about the game, stating that such information was outdated or false. Prassel ceased such actions after the game's release and stated, "Typically we at Spiral don't ban or even manage threads and we leave that to Steam moderators. However, this time I did partake and probably too aggressively".

In February 2014, Orion: Dino Horde was made available to Steam players for free during a week-long event. The purchase price was also reduced from $14.99 to $1 during that time. The game sold more than 500,000 copies during the promotion, and active users increased to approximately 3,000, up from 100. The $1 price became standard for over 25 years, and Orion: Prelude had sold more than 2 million copies as of 2015, including previous iterations. At the time, the game had a mostly positive rating among Steam players. Trek Industries released a trailer noting the Steam rating while embracing the game's prior negative reception and its progress since then, stating, "In 2012 we released one of the worst games of all time and almost everyone hated it".

Christopher Livingston of PC Gamer reviewed Orion: Prelude, praising the $1 price and calling the game "a noisy, silly, fairly obnoxious experience, but definitely an enjoyable one in small doses".

In July 2026, the game entered active development once again. Prassel declared that he has a "strong vision for the direction of ORION: Prelude and the untapped potential here is immense", with plans to raise the game's iconic $1 price up to $9.99.

== Other games ==
=== The Orion Project ===
The Orion Project, also known as Orion, was released in 2014, as an Early Access title on Steam. Spiral opened a Kickstarter page, seeking $200,000 to complete the game. It was removed from Steam in 2016, after Activision filed a DMCA complaint, alleging that the game contained digital assets without authorization from the company. The assets depicted weapons and helmets, and had been used in two previous games by Activision, Call of Duty: Advanced Warfare (2014) and Call of Duty: Black Ops III (2015).

Prassel initially denied the accusations, but soon confirmed that such assets had been included in the game. He fired the artist responsible, and explained that studio employees worked remotely, making it difficult to closely monitor their actions. Prassel's development team had previously been criticized for its early versions of Orion: Prelude, which mistakenly included assets from Primal Carnage and Natural Selection 2.

=== Guardians of Orion ===
In 2015, a prequel known as Guardians of Orion was released on Steam as an Early Access title. It is set 10 years prior to Orion: Prelude, and features robot enemies in addition to dinosaurs.
