= Primal Carnage: Extinction =

2015 video game

- Developers: Circle 5 Studios; Pub Games; Panic Button (PS4)
- Publisher: Circle 5 Studios
- Engine: Unreal Engine 3
- Platforms: Microsoft Windows, PlayStation 4, PlayStation 5
- Release: Microsoft Windows: WW: April 3, 2015; PlayStation 4: NA: October 20, 2015; EU: November 24, 2015; Evolution; PlayStation 4, PlayStation 5: WW: May 28, 2026
- Genre: First-person shooter
- Modes: Single-player, multiplayer

Primal Carnage: Extinction is an asymmetrical multiplayer game released for Microsoft Windows and PlayStation 4. It features human versus dinosaur combat. Players choose which team to play on, and each team has a set of characters divided into classes. The game is a sequel to the 2012 Windows game Primal Carnage, which was developed by Lukewarm Media. Like its predecessor, it features similar first-person shooter human gameplay and third-person dinosaur gameplay.

The sequel began as a complete rebuild of the original game and was to be released as a free update. However, Circle 5 Studios took over development from Lukewarm Media, and announced that the update would instead be released as a separate game known as Primal Carnage: Extinction, co-developed by Pub Games. It was released for Windows on April 3, 2015. The PlayStation 4 version, developed by Panic Button, was released on October 20, 2015.

A remastered version titled Primal Carnage: Evolution for the PlayStation 4 and PlayStation 5 was announced on September 28, 2023, aiming to bring the console release up to date with the Steam version of Primal Carnage: Extinction. It was released on May 28, 2026.

== Gameplay ==
Primal Carnage: Extinction is an asymmetrical multiplayer game similar to its predecessor, Primal Carnage. The game pits humans against dinosaurs, with team members on both sides divided into character classes. Gameplay is viewed from a third-person perspective when playing as a dinosaur. Playing on the human team switches the game to a first-person shooter. Humans have an array of weapons to use, while dinosaurs roar to activate a number of different abilities, although a waiting period exists in between the use of such abilities. Playable creatures include Carnotaurus, Dilophosaurus, the fictional Novaraptor, Pteranodon, and Tyrannosaurus.

Game modes include Team Deathmatch and Get to the Chopper. In the latter, human players try to reach a helicopter and escape while dinosaur players try to stop them. Other modes include Survival, in which humans face off against a growing number of dinosaurs; and Free Roam, allowing players to explore a level without objectives.

== Development and release ==
The original Primal Carnage was developed by Lukewarm Media and released for Microsoft Windows in 2012. As of 2014, the company was working on a complete rebuild of Primal Carnage, replacing its game code for a less-glitchy gameplay experience. The rebuild, referred to as Primal Carnage 2.0, was initially planned as a free update. Circle 5 Studios took over the Primal Carnage series later in 2014, following disagreements within Lukewarm Media over a planned prequel game known as Primal Carnage: Genesis. The new company consisted of a modding community dedicated to the original game.

Circle 5 announced in October 2014 that the free update would instead be released as a separate game, Primal Carnage: Extinction, which would serve as a sequel. Owners of the original game could purchase the sequel for a discount. In addition to a Windows version, it was also announced that the game would receive a PlayStation 4 port. Primal Carnage: Extinction was co-developed by Circle 5 along with Pub Games, based in Australia. Like its predecessor, the game was created using Unreal Engine 3.

The Windows version officially released on Steam April 3, 2015, after exiting the early access phase. The PlayStation 4 version was developed by Panic Button, and was published through the PlayStation Network. It was released in the U.S. on October 20, 2015, followed by a European release on November 24.

A remastered version titled Primal Carnage: Evolution for the PlayStation 4 and PlayStation 5 was announced on September 28, 2023, aiming to bring the console release up to date with the Steam version of Primal Carnage: Extinction. It was released on May 28, 2026.

== Reception ==
PlayStation 4 reviews

Aggregate score
Aggregator	Score
Metacritic	46/100

Review scores
Publication	Score
PlayStation Official Magazine – UK	30/100
Push Square	5/10
Multiplayer.it	5/10

The PlayStation 4 version of Primal Carnage: Extinction received "generally unfavorable reviews" according to Metacritic. The Windows version, upon its official launch in April 2015, was heavily criticized for technical problems that were still present after months of early access. On TechRaptor, Georgina Young said that, "the concept is awesome," but, "bugs and glitches are rampant," calling the game "virtually unplayable" on MacBook Pro (the game does not officially support Mac) and giving it a 2.5 rating out of 10. The PlayStation 4 version was also criticized for glitches.

Matt Adcock of Push Square wrote that "anything with dinosaurs in it should be more entertaining than this". He praised the dinosaur animations but opined that the environments lacked "pizazz", while stating that the humans looked too cartoonish. Rosario Salatiello of Multiplayer.it was critical of the artificial intelligence and found the use of Unreal Engine 3 to be outdated. Salatiello concluded that the game would have benefitted from more time in development. PlayStation Official Magazine – UK called it a "flimsy-feeling team shooter that squanders an appealing premise in a mess of poor controls and design". Writing for Blast Magazine, Grant Bickelhaupt called it, "a thoroughly good time," however, the balancing was criticized, with the human gameplay described as "punishing." The review gave Extinction 2.8 stars out of 5, with poor ratings in the story and lasting appeal categories.

HookedGamers awarded the game a Fun Score of 6.8, praising the dinosaur sound design, saying that it "gives the game an added boost." When describing the game as a whole, the reviewer docked points for clipping issues and having few game modes, noting that, "it does lack that little bit of polish that would make it a great game," but summing up with, "Primal Carnage: Extinction is still worth your time, especially if you love dinosaurs." CanadianOnlineGamers praised the game's dinosaur animations, sound design and music, scoring the game a 70/100 and called Extinction, "A fun dino romp for fans of these giant (and not-so-giant) lizards. It doesn't really bring anything else new to the table in the team deathmatch genre, but what it does bring, it does it well."
