= Heron: Steam Machine =

2009 video game

- Developer: Triangle Studios
- Publisher: Triangle Studios
- Platforms: Wii (WiiWare), iOS
- Release: WiiWare: PAL: October 16, 2009; NA: January 4, 2010; iOS; October 16, 2009
- Genre: Puzzle
- Modes: Single-player, multiplayer

Heron: Steam Machine is a puzzle video game by Triangle Studios, released for WiiWare and iOS. It is a new take on the Pipe Mania concept, adding arcade elements such as multiplayer gameplay and changing the format to a filled board with rotatable blocks rather than being able to place new blocks on the board.

== Gameplay ==
The game features a story about a factory in which a steam engine produces rubber ducks. The player is represented by the factory technician Ron, who has to keep the machine in check. While producing ducks, the steam machine's four color-coded systems (green for steam, yellow for electricity, blue for water and red for oil) grow and the player has to keep them down by connecting entry and exit points for the respective colors. This is done by rotating the blocks on screen. When a link is completed, the gauge for that system will go down, the blocks will be removed from the screen and new blocks will be added from the top in a Tetris style.

The goal is to keep the machine running as long as possible, while the difficulty increases both by adding more systems that fail at once (which then need to all be connected before they will cool off) and increasing the rate of failure for the systems.

Sometimes certain blocks will appear in the game grid which have special properties other than connecting adjacent blocks. Such properties include having the destruction slowed down or adding score multipliers if they are used in the path. Bomb blocks will also appear, which can be triggered to destroy a portion of the grid and have new blocks dropped in.

=== Controls ===
Heron: Steam Machine can be controlled with the Wii Remote on the Wii or by touching the screen to rotate a block clockwise on the iPhone. When playing on the Wii, two styles of control can be used. holding the remote horizontally allows the selection and rotation of blocks by using the D-pad and the 1- and 2-buttons to rotate clockwise and counter-clockwise. When holding the remote vertically, players can point at the block they want to rotate and then rotate it by holding the A-button while turning their wrist. The game automatically detects which type of control the player is using.

=== Multiplayer ===
The WiiWare version of the game features local cooperative multiplayer for up to four players. This is done by dividing the board among the players and having each player only able to access their own portion of the screen. The players will need to work together to still make the pipes match, having their scores added. Separate scoreboards are kept in the game for one, two, three and four player games.

No multiplayer gameplay is currently available on the iOS version.

== Reception ==
Nintendo Life gave it a 7/10, stating that it "isn't going to win any awards, but it has a clean cartoony look and offers a great 5-minute pick-up game that will have broad appeal." Wiiloveit.com thought the "teamwork-building multiplayer" was a nice touch, as was its "warm atmosphere". The site gave it a total rating of 24/30. IGN gave the game a 6.0/10, stating that while fans of Pipe Dream might enjoy it, the pre-filled board can cause "frequent frustration". The game holds a Metacritic score of 70/100, based on 5 critic reviews.
