= Roundabout (video game) =

2014 video game

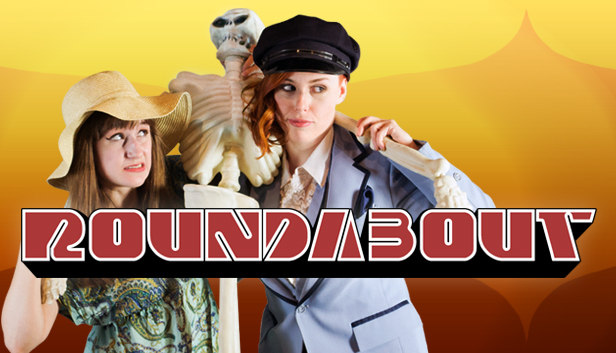
- Developer: No Goblin LLC
- Publisher: No Goblin LLC
- Engine: Unity
- Platforms: Microsoft Windows, OS X, Linux, Xbox One, PlayStation 4, PlayStation Vita
- Release: Windows, OS X, Linux; September 18, 2014; Xbox One; February 20, 2015; PlayStation 4 May 26, 2015; PlayStation Vita; June 26, 2018
- Genre: Racing
- Mode: Single-player

Roundabout is an open world indie racing video game developed and published by American indie studio No Goblin LLC. In the game, described as inspired by Kuru Kuru Kururin and Crazy Taxi, the player explores a large world while driving a constantly revolving limousine. It was released for Windows, Mac and Linux on September 18, 2014, for Xbox One on February 20, 2015, and for PlayStation 4 on May 26, 2015. A PlayStation Vita port was released on June 26, 2018, as a cross-buy title with the PlayStation 4 version.

== Gameplay ==
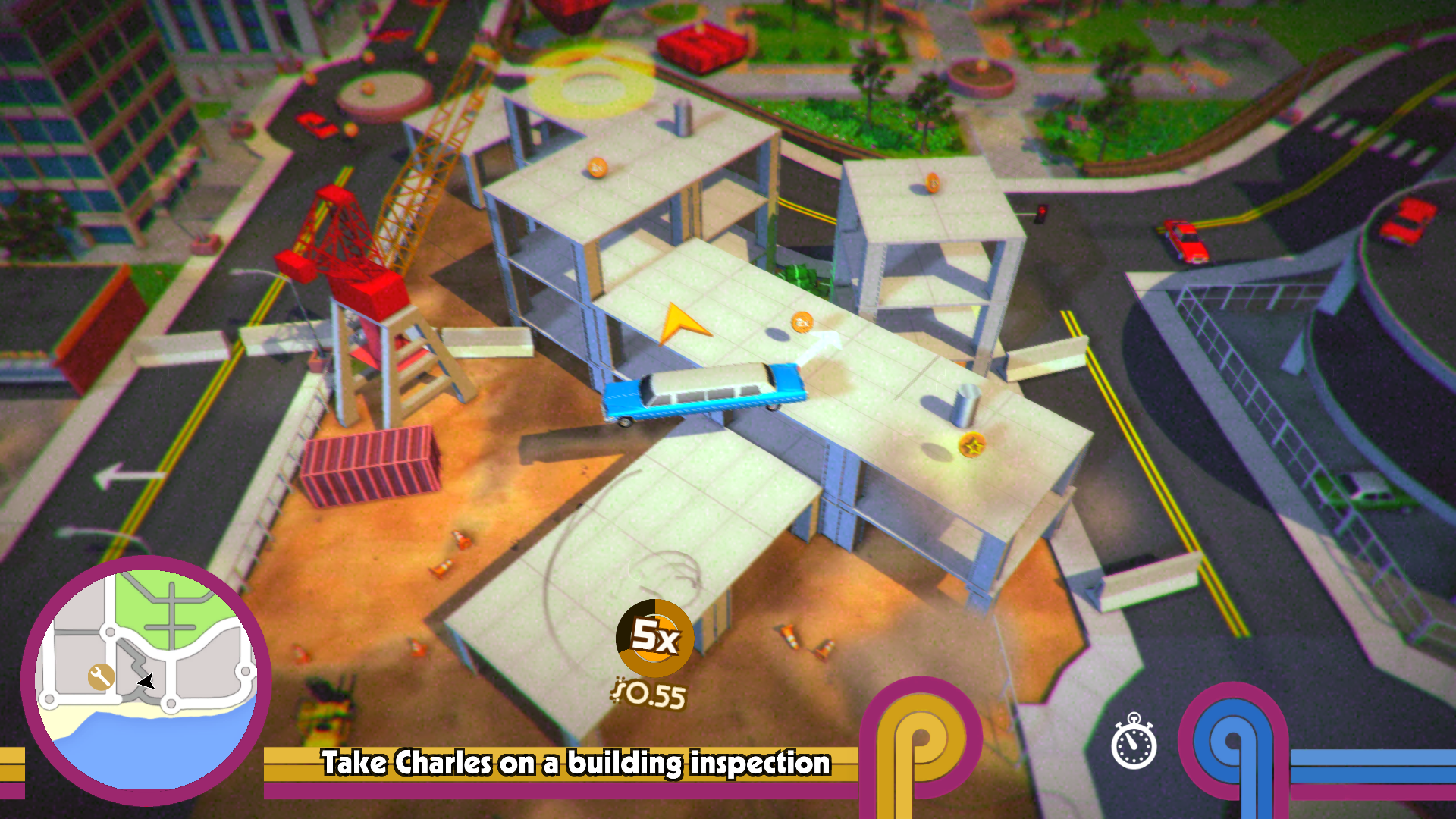
Gameplay

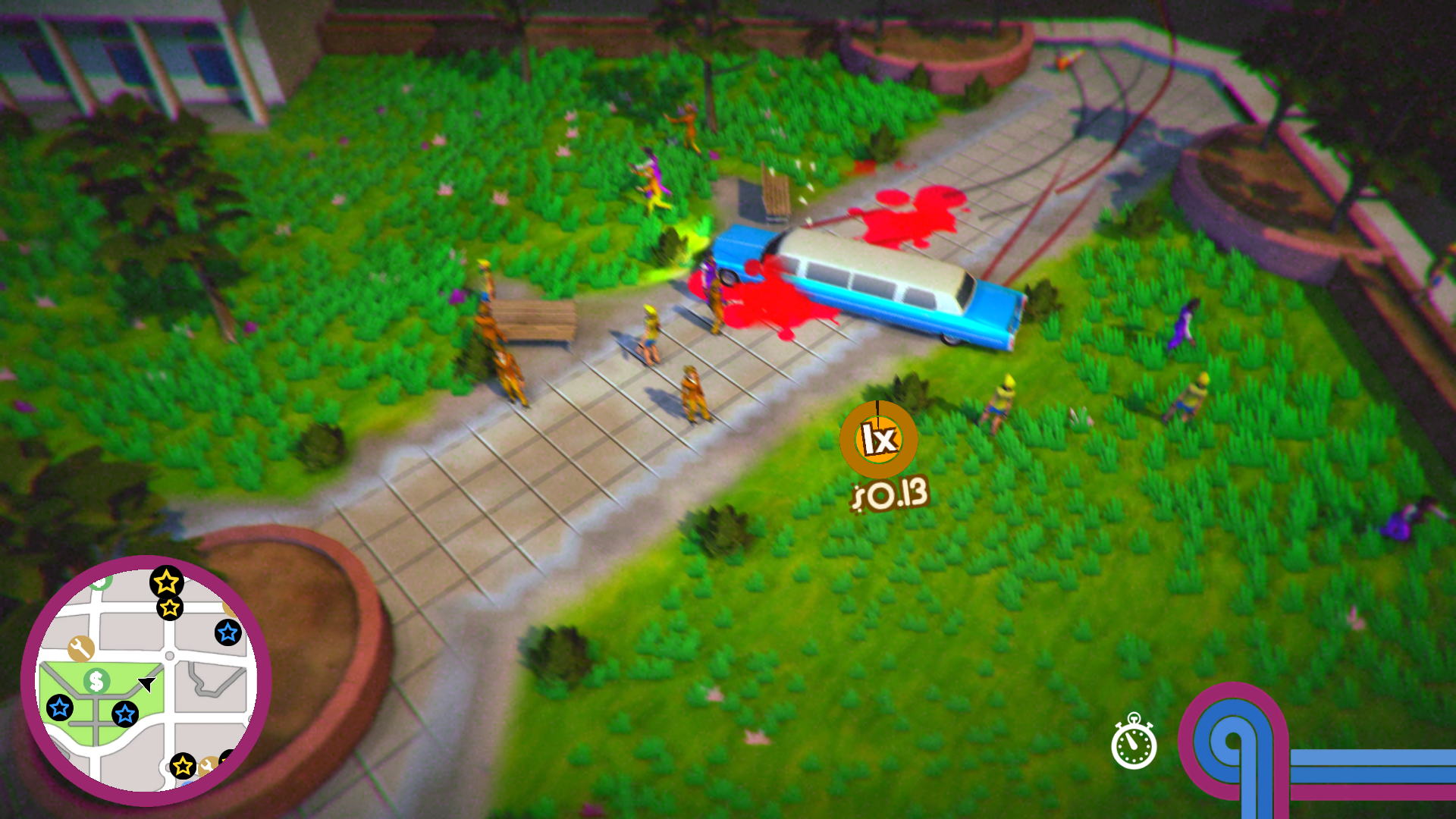
Gameplay

The player controls a constantly-rotating limousine, and drives around an open world in search of missions to complete. Each mission begins with a full motion video cutscene of a non-player character entering the limousine and explaining the mission's objectives and parameters. These objectives can include picking up and dropping people off at specific locations or finding collectible items. A combo meter can be maintained the player repeatedly obtains collectibles and passes checkpoints before it depletes, increasing their score. Hitting solid obstacles will damage the limo, destroying it if too much damage is taken and affecting the mission's score. At the end of each mission, the player is graded based on how many special objectives were completed, such as finishing within a certain time limit, avoiding damage, or grabbing every collectible. Players can earn money that can be spent on cosmetics or additional properties around town. Other collectibles such as cache and new limousine horns can be found scattered around the open world. Upgrades for the limousine are also earned by completing specific in-game objectives.

== Plot ==
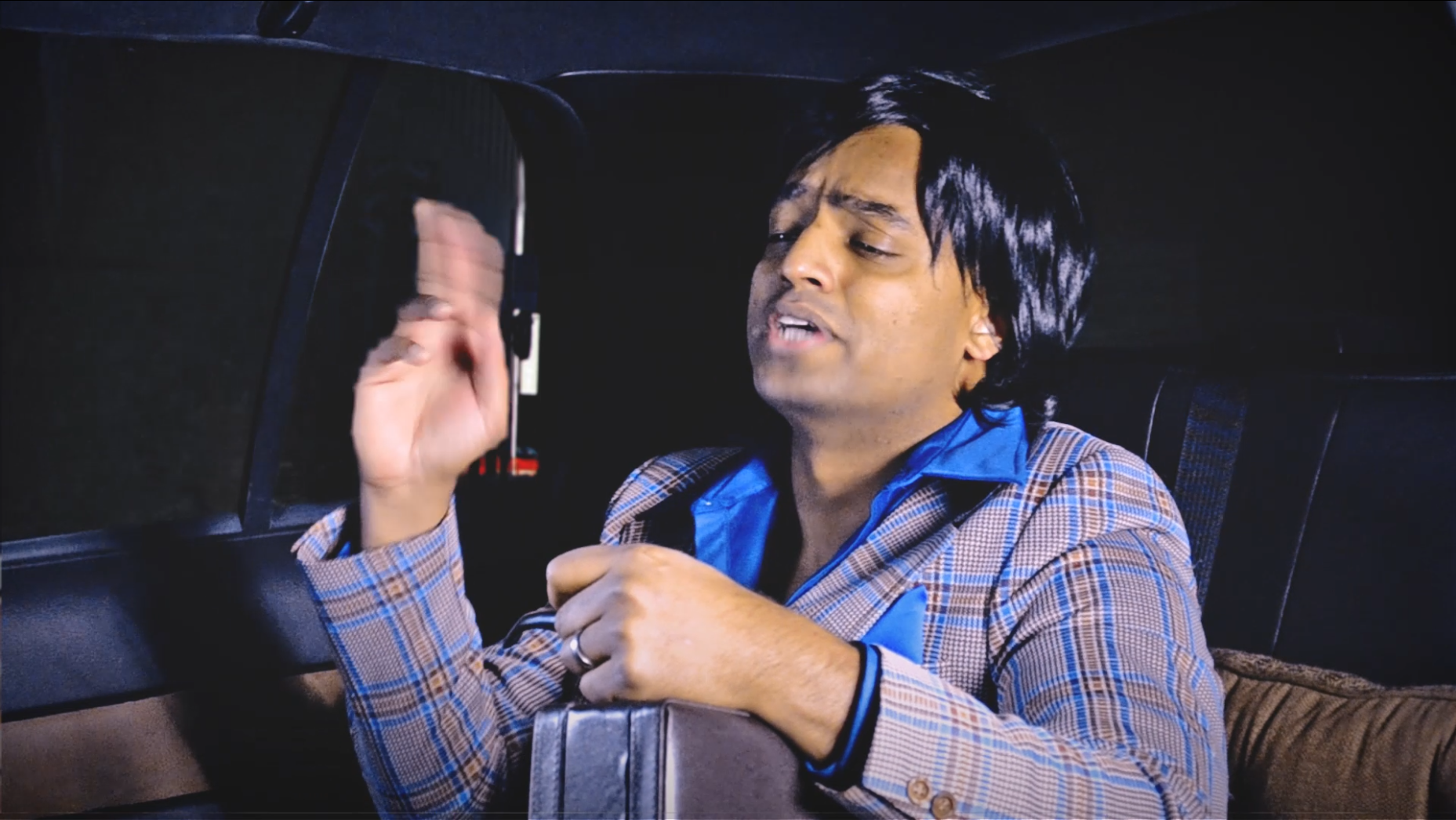
A full-motion video sequence of passenger Charles Maximilian

In 1977, Georgio Manos becomes the world's first revolving limousine driver, taxiing the citizens of the city of Roundabout to various destinations. A frequent passenger named Elizabeth earns Georgio's deep admiration, and a romance begins to develop between the two. Georgio also develops a rivalry with Ronaldo, another limousine driver who steals Georgio's technique and overtakes them as the #1 revolving limousine driver in the city. Desperate to defeat Ronaldo, Georgio acquires some candy dots with the help of Mickey the mechanic, which causes Georgio to hallucinate and see Jeffrey the Skeleton. Guided by Jeffrey in a candy-dot-fueled frenzy, Georgio goes on a murderous rampage through the city. Spurred on by Elizabeth, Georgio then challenges Ronaldo to a race, during which they run Ronaldo off the road, destroying his car and killing him.

Six months later, Georgio has retreated to the northern mountains out of shame, as destroying someone else's car is akin to treason in Roundabout. Having lost Elizabeth and running low on candy dots, Jeffrey urges Georgio to get their act back together and win back Elizabeth's heart. At the same time, Georgio is hounded by Ge-Op (Georgio Operations), a police squad tasked with hunting them down. In the end, Georgio and Elizabeth are reunited, and Elizabeth explains that she is tired of Georgio's constant spinning, pleading with Georgio to drive straight for even a little while. After Georgio awkwardly attempts to drive straight, Elizabeth decides that she should not force Georgio to be someone they are not, and the two drive off into the sunset together.

== Reception ==
Roundabout

Aggregate score
Aggregator	Score
Metacritic	XONE: 74/100; PC:75/100

Review scores
Publication	Score
Polygon	PC: 7.5/10
Push Square	PS4: 6/10
IGN Spain	XONE: 5.5/10

The game's PC received favorable reviews, while the Xbox One version received mixed reviews upon release. Dave Tach of Polygon praised the game stating "Combining elements from driving, puzzle and FMV games without becoming a product of one genre" and saying that the developers made "a unique hybrid."

Phil Kennedy of Push Square criticized the game's lack of content saying "Failure of missions is impossible with death just meaning a respawn a short distance away." As a result he said he "breezed through the game relatively quickly, with each mission taking around five minutes and the story about three hours in total." He didn't feel "particularly inclined to revisit any of the stages a second time in an attempt to better our scores."

IGN Spain called it "a disappointing game that was aiming to become the next Crazy Taxi but fails on achieving it. Short, ugly and not even funny."
