= Trillion: God of Destruction =

2015 video game

- Developers: Compile Heart; Idea Factory
- Publisher: Idea Factory
- Series: Makai Ichiban Kan
- Platforms: PlayStation Vita, Microsoft Windows
- Release: PlayStation Vita: JP: July 23, 2015; NA: March 29, 2016; EU: April 1, 2016; Windows: WW: November 7, 2016
- Genre: Role-playing
- Mode: Single-player

Trillion: God of Destruction (魔壊神トリリオン, Makai Shin Toririon) is a Japanese role-playing video game for the PlayStation Vita. It is the first game in the Makai Ichiban Kan series of games. It was released on July 23, 2015 in Japan, March 29, 2016 in North America, and April 1, 2016 in Europe. Developed by Compile Heart and published by Idea Factory, the game contains several key staff from the Disgaea series of games.

== Gameplay ==
The game plays as a strategy tactical role-playing game with elements of dating sims as well. The player progresses by raising and bonding with six Demon Lords, girls with different strengths and weaknesses, so that they become capable of facing against Trillion. Training these Demon Lords involves triggering special events, and the storyline will branch into different endings based on the player's actions. The in-game battle system resembles a cross between that of roguelike and simulation role-playing games, and the player is required to raise characters ahead of a deadline known in advance. Death is a strategical element in the game, and because of that, a single Demon Lord cannot defeat Trillion alone. Outside of the six original Demon Lords, other characters such as Elma and Kerberos can awaken into Demon Lords under certain conditions.

The game has a new game plus mode for replaying the game multiple times.

== Story ==
=== Setting ===
The game takes place within a demonic hell separated into six layers. The Demon King Zeabolos, having previously lost against a battle with Trillion, makes a deal with a grimoire-wielding girl by the name of Faust. In exchange for Zeabolos' soul, Faust grants him his life, and he travels to fight against Trillion again alongside six Demon Lords. These Demon Lords, each with the appearance of a young girl, go by the names of Ruche, Levia, Fegor, Mammon, PerPell, and Ashmedia. Ten different endings are possible based on the choices of the player.

=== Characters ===
- Zeabolos (ゼアボロス, Zeaborosu) – The game's main character, tasked with teaming up with the game's six Demon Lords to defeat the game's antagonist, Trillion.
- Faust (ファウスト, Fausuto) – A grimoire-wielding girl who saved Zeabolos' life by using her grimoire Soul Grimoire. She made a deal for Zeabolos by giving him power to overthrow Trillion in exchange for his soul.
- Trillion (トリリオン, Toririon) – A great foe who has 1,000,000,000,000 HP and is an assembly of a trillion hatreds, hence his name.
- Ruche (ルゥシェ, Ruushe) – A proud and high-handed demon lord representing Lucifer's sin of pride and arrogance, and the niece of Zeabolos.
- Levia (レヴィア, Revuia) – Zeabolos' childhood friend representing Leviathan's sin of envy and jealousy, who maintains a mature facade amongst others.
- Fegor (フェゴール, Fegōru) – The older sister of Zeabolos, representing Belphegor's sin of sloth, and is very lazy.
- Mammon (マモン, Mamon) – Zeabolos' cousin representing Mammon's sin of greed, who decides to help Zeabolos in order to gain the riches offered by the underworld.
- PerPell (ペルペル, Peruperu) – A lighthearted and foolish niece of Zeabolos representing Beelzebub's sin of gluttony, who intends on turning the underworld into a giant kingdom made of candy.
- Ashmedia (アシュメディア, Ashumedia) – Another cousin of Zeabolos who represents Asmodeus' sin of lust who enjoys displaying her sex appeal around.
- Elma (エルマ, Eruma) – Zeabolos' younger sister who has poor health and therefore spends her days inside the Demon King’s castle.
- Kerberos (ケルベロス, Keruberosu) – Elma’s pet dog who lost its power due to Trillion’s miasma.
- Astaroth (アスタロス, Asutarosu) – The Demon Lord of melancholy who used to guard the Demon King’s castle together with Kerberos. He is the older brother of Zeabolos, and the father of Ruche and PerPell. He dies in a counterattack against Trillion in the very beginning of the story.

== Development ==
The game was first announced in March 2014 under the name Makai Shin Trillion as the first release in a newly announced Makai Ichiban Kan series of games by Compile Heart. It was first announced as a "sometime in 2014" release date in Japan, without any international dates mentioned at all. The game was later delayed into 2015, eventually being release on July 23. The Japanese release came with a limited edition release as well, consisting of an art book, music soundtrack, and a collection of seven short stories. In October 2015, Idea Factory International announced that the game would be receiving an English release sometime in the first half of 2016. In February, the North American and European release dates were announced as March 29 and April 1, 2016 respectively.

The game contained several key staff from the Disgaea series of Japanese tactical role-playing video games. The game is directed by Masahiro Yamamoto, who previously directed Disgaea 4. The game's music was composed by Tenpei Sato, who had previously composed music for Disgaea: Hour of Darkness and Phantom Brave. Character art was designed by Kei Nanameda, who had previously done designs in Compile Hearts' Mugen Souls.

The game's localization required the translation of over 1.2 million words. In translating the English release, the team strove to take a balanced approach between sticking closely to the source material, and making changes for English readers. Overall, they stuck to the source material, but some smaller cultural references were changed in order to convey the same meaning to English readers. The team chose to keep and implement humor into the script in the same manner they had with the Hyperdimension Neptunia series of games.

== Reception ==
Reception

Aggregate score
Aggregator	Score
Metacritic	Vita: 65/100

Review score
Publication	Score
Famitsu	34/40

Famitsu gave the Japanese release a review score of 34/40. Within the first week of release in Japan, the game sold 18,506 physical retail copies, placing fifth within the weekly software sales charts.
