= Hot Tin Roof: The Cat That Wore a Fedora =

2015 platforming video game

Hot Tin Roof: The Cat That Wore A Fedora
- Developer: Glass Bottom Games
- Publisher: Glass Bottom Games
- Designer: Megan Fox
- Engine: Unity
- Platforms: Microsoft Windows, OS X, Linux
- Release: WW: February 20, 2015
- Genres: Platform-adventure, Metroidvania
- Mode: Single-player

Hot Tin Roof: The Cat That Wore A Fedora is a 2015 action-adventure platform game created by American indie studio Glass Bottom Games.

== Plot ==
Emma Jones is an ex-firefighter who has become a private detective; her partner is Franky, a cat. Together, they must explore the city and solve a murder mystery.

== Gameplay ==
Hot Tin Roof is a three-dimensional action-adventure game in which the player controls Emma and Franky in their search for clues around the city. Initially, they can do little but walk and jump, but as they uncover more of the game's world, they acquire additional items that allow them to access new areas, and thus find additional clues, gradually unravelling the mystery. The city is filled with enemies who must be dispatched with Emma's gun; she can then acquire various types of ammunition from her defeated foes. The duo can also question NPCs for information, with conversations guided by dialogue trees.

== Reception ==
Hot Tin Roof received mixed reviews, currently sitting at 66/100 on Metacritic. Jason Faulkner of Destructoid gave the game 6/10, saying, "[s]ome things were well executed, while others were distracting and annoying." He said he "really liked the 3D spin on the traditional 'Metroidvania' setup", but found the game's emphasis on searching for clues "incredibly frustrating", and also criticized the game's writing, arguing it was "of dubious quality. Some of it is genuinely funny and engaging, while other times it feels stilted and dull, as if the developers just needed more length to the script." Adam Smith of Rock Paper Shotgun was more positive, writing that the game "delighted me and made me laugh so many times", specifically praising the "worldbuilding that consistently tickled my funnybone."
