= Primal Carnage =

2012 video game

- Developer: Lukewarm Media
- Publisher: Reverb Publishing
- Engine: Unreal Engine 3
- Platform: Microsoft Windows
- Release: October 29, 2012
- Genre: First-person shooter
- Modes: Multiplayer, Single-player

Primal Carnage is an asymmetrical multiplayer game developed by Lukewarm Media and released by Reverb Publishing. The game pits a group of armed humans against predatory dinosaurs in various combat scenarios. Human gameplay takes the form of a first-person shooter, whilst the dinosaurs are controlled from a third-person perspective. Lukewarm Media, an indie development team, announced the game in February 2010, and eventually released it on October 29, 2012. Primal Carnage received "mixed or average reviews" according to Metacritic.

A prequel game, Primal Carnage: Genesis, was announced in 2013, but was put on hold shortly thereafter due to disagreements within Lukewarm Media. A complete rebuild of the original game was in development as of 2014. Circle 5 Studios took over the series later that year, and eventually published the rebuild as a sequel in 2015, under the name Primal Carnage: Extinction.

== Gameplay ==
Primal Carnage is an action and online asymmetrical multiplayer game that pits humans against dinosaurs. Both teams have their own set of playable characters, divided into classes. Team members work together, using their own unique abilities to succeed. Gameplay is viewed from a third-person perspective when playing as a dinosaur, while human players experience the game as a first-person shooter. Players on both teams have the option of seeing their teammates through walls. Dinosaurs eat humans to regain health, while humans must reach certain areas to replenish health and ammunition. Dinosaurs can hide in bushes and wait to attack humans, who generally take refuge in a few select, open areas such as a helipad while they defend against the dinosaurs.

=== Team members ===
The game has five human characters with weapons such as shotguns, snipers, and flamethrowers. One character can throw flares to blind nearby dinosaurs, and others can trap the animals in nets or tranquilize them.

The game debuted with five playable dinosaurs, including Tyrannosaurus, Carnotaurus, and Dilophosaurus. Like humans, dinosaurs also have their own abilities as well, activated by roaring. A dinosaur's abilities can be used to aid themselves or their fellow team members. The Tyrannosaurus can consume humans in one bite, and can offer a health bonus to nearby dinosaurs. Because it is the most powerful dinosaur, the number of Tyrannosaurus players is limited in each game.

The Carnotaurus has the ability to charge into humans, injuring them. The Dilophosaurus can blind humans by spitting venom at them. Another dinosaur is the fictional Novaraptor, which has the ability to jump and can pounce on humans. The fifth playable animal is Pteranodon, a member of the pterosaur group which is commonly mistaken for dinosaurs. The Pteranodon can fly and swoop down to snatch humans, before dropping them to their death. It can also locate humans from above and relay those locations to other dinosaur players.

Players who pre-ordered the game received a feathered raptor as a bonus playable character. Several new creatures were added in 2013, including Spinosaurus, Cryolophosaurus, Oviraptor, and the pterosaur Tupandactylus.

=== Maps and game modes ===
The game initially had five maps, including a loading dock. It launched with one game mode: Team Deathmatch. Get to the Chopper, a free downloadable content (DLC) pack, was released in 2013. It consists of a new jungle level set during a storm. Human players race down a linear path to reach a helicopter and escape, while dinosaur players try to stop them. The pack also introduced the Spinosaurus. A new game mode, Capture the Egg, was added later in 2013. It plays similarly to capture the flag, with human players sneaking into dinosaur nesting areas.

== Development and release ==
Primal Carnage was developed by Lukewarm Media, an independent developer consisting of 21 people from around the world. The game was announced in February 2010, and was expected to release for Microsoft Windows and Linux during the fourth quarter of the year. It was originally developed using the Unigine game engine, although the development team switched to Unreal Development Kit (a free version of Unreal Engine 3) later in 2010. This made the release of a Linux version unlikely.

The game moved to open beta testing on October 8, 2012, and received a wide release on October 29, 2012, by Reverb Publishing. It was the first game by Lukewarm Media to be published. The game was available for download through its official website, as well as online retailers such as Steam and GamersGate.

== Reception ==
Reception

Aggregate score
Aggregator	Score
Metacritic	67/100

Review scores
Publication	Score
GameSpot	6.5/10
GameSpy	3.5/5
IGN	7.6/10
Joystiq	3.5/5
PC Gamer (US)	65/100
CD-Action	60/100
Multiplayer.it	7/10
Vandal	6.8/10

Primal Carnage received "mixed or average reviews" according to Metacritic. At launch, some players complained of glitches, such as start-up problems and crashing. Critics also noted that Primal Carnage contained only one game mode at launch and believed that it would need more features in the near future to survive. Maxwell McGee, writing for GameSpot, stated that the game "hits on a fun design, but stumbles in execution. A lack of content and some technical issues leave this game feeling like a $15 beta rather than an official release". Mike Sharkey of GameSpy wrote, "What's there is terrific, there just needs to be more of it. Here's hoping it doesn't go extinct before it evolves into something really great". Xav de Matos of Joystiq called it an "entertaining experience" despite missing "some key elements and polish". Lukewarm Media issued updates to correct the technical issues.

Some critics found the team abilities to be adequately balanced, and considered Primal Carnage superior to recent games such as Dino D-Day and Orion: Dino Beatdown. Others found the levels reminiscent of the Jurassic Park films. Leif Johnson of IGN wrote that it "may not be the most visually stunning game around, but it works well with what it has".

Carlos Leiva of Vandal praised the game's concept of humans against dinosaurs, while CD-Action found the idea to be the game's only unique offering. de Matos wrote that "squaring off against a speedy raptor or trying to outmaneuver a giant Tyrannosaurus and somehow making it out alive is thrilling". Johnson found the game design basic and outdated, and was disappointed by the different camera perspective when playing as a dinosaur, writing that while it "allows for some gruesomely satisfying kills, it sometimes interferes with their execution". PC Gamer called it "a Jurassic Park worth visiting once, but not for a long stay".

== Other games ==
In 2013, Lukewarm Media announced plans for a prequel game known as Primal Carnage: Genesis. It would be significantly different from the first installment, playing as a story-driven, single-player game. However, the project was put on hold later in 2013, due to disagreements within the company regarding the project's large scope.

As of 2014, Lukewarm Media was working on a complete rebuild of the original game known as Primal Carnage 2.0, which was to be released as a free update. However, Circle 5 Studios took over the series in 2014, and published the rebuild as a sequel and paid update in 2015, under the title Primal Carnage: Extinction. It was co-developed by Pub Games.

A virtual reality game, Primal Carnage: Onslaught, was released on December 29, 2016, as an early access title on Steam. It was developed by Pub Games and published by Circle 5 Studios.
