= Triangle Studios =

Dutch video game developer

- Company type: Video game developer
- Industry: Video games
- Founded: 2005
- Headquarters: Leeuwarden, Netherlands
- Key people: Remco de Rooij, Timen Rienstra, Stefan Kuizenga, Johan Bolsenbroek
- Number of employees: Between 15 and 20
- Website: http://triangle-studios.com/

Triangle Studios is a mid-sized computer game development company based in Leeuwarden, Netherlands, founded in 2005. It has developed several games for the PC, the Nintendo DS and iOS. On March 2, 2010, the company opened a new branch office in Dallas, Texas. They participated in the Tokyo Game Show in 2008 as a part of the Holland Pavilion, in order to establish connections with Japanese publishers and enter the Asian gaming market.

== Games ==
Triangle Studios initial focus was the development of games for the Nintendo DS:

- Stratego: Next Edition
- K3 en het IJsprinsesje
- Plop en de Pinguïn
- Eén tegen 100
- 10 voor Taal
- Pluk van de Petteflet
- Denksport Varia
- Winter's Tail
- Think Kids 2
- My Virtual Tutor: Pre-K to Kindergarten
- My Virtual Tutor: Kindergarten to First Grade
- My Virtual Tutor: First Grade to Second Grade
- Suske en Wiske: De Texas Rakkers
- Calvin Tucker's Redneck Racing

Triangle Studios games portfolio
Title	Release date	Publisher	Platform	Genre	Notes	Ref
Heron: Steam Machine	October 16, 2009	Triangle Studios	Wii (WiiWare), Nintendo DSi, Web	Puzzle, Action		
Calvin Tucker's Redneck Farm Animals Racing Tournament	August 3, 2010	Zoo Games	Nintendo DS	Racing		
WINtA	December 9, 2010	Ngmoco	iOS	Music	Developed with NanaOn-Sha	
Graffiti Wars	December 19, 2010	Stink & Muse	iOS	Strategy		
Muddy Monsters Attack Ameland	June 17, 2011	Sterc & VVV Ameland	iOS	Strategy		
Stratego: Next Edition	June 23, 2011	Ubisoft	Nintendo DSi	Puzzle		
Dancepad	June 28, 2012	Moonshark	iOS (iPad)	Rhythm, Action		
Stumpy's Alphabet Dinner	July 5, 2013	Roo Roo Games	iOS	Education		
Battleflip	December 12, 2013	Stink & Muse	iOS	Puzzle, Action		
Robot Dance Party	September 4, 2014	DeNA West	Android, iOS	Rhythm, Action		
Monsterpark Zoo	October 16, 2014	Roo Roo Games	Android, iOS	Education		
Cross of the Dutchman	September 10, 2015	Triangle Studios	Steam	Action, Adventure		
It came from space and ate our brains	March 19, 2015	Triangle Studios	Steam	Action, Shooter, Multiplayer		
The Bug Butcher (Console version)	January 19, 2016 (PC) October 18, 2016 (PS4) October 19, 2016 (Xbox One)	Awfully Nice Studios	Steam, PlayStation 4, Xbox One	Shooter		
Age of Booty: (Tactics)	July 14, 2016	Certain Affinity	Android, iOS	Strategy, Puzzle, Multiplayer		
Through The Woods	October 27, 2016 (PC) May 2, 2018 (Xbox One) May 8, 2018 (PS4)	1C Company	Steam, PlayStation 4, Xbox One	Adventure, Horror	Developed with Antagonist	
Uphill Rush	March 1, 2017	Spil Games	Android, iOS	Racing		
Real Farm	October 20, 2017 April 26, 2021 (Gold Edition)	Soedesco	Linux, Macintosh, PlayStation 4, Windows, Xbox One, Xbox Series	Simulation		
Pocket Cowboys: Wild West Standoff	April 11, 2019	Foxglove Studios	Android, iOS	Real-Time Strategy		
Truck Driver	September 19, 2019	Soedesco	Nintendo Switch, PlayStation 4, Windows, Xbox One	Racing, Simulation		
Convoy: A Tactical Roguelike	April 8, 2020	Triangle Studios	Nintendo Switch, PlayStation 4, Xbox One,		Developed by Convoy Games	
Slide Stars	November 10, 2020	Lion Castle Entertainment	Nintendo Switch, PlayStation 4, Xbox One	Platform		
Mickey Storm and the Cursed Mask	August 24, 2021	Lion Castle Entertainment	Nintendo Switch, PlayStation 4, Xbox One, Xbox Series	Platform, Puzzle		
From Space	Q1 2022	Triangle Studios	Steam, Stadia	Multiplayer, Role-playing game		

Triangle Studios developed a game about the historical figure Pier Gerlofs Donia titled Cross of the Dutchman.The game received "mixed or average reviews" per Metacritic, with an average score of 59 out of 100. Together with 'It came from space and ate our brains' this makes up Triangle Studios original IP's. In June 2011, Triangle Studios released the "Visit McKinney Texas" app at the behest of the McKinney Convention & Visitors Bureau, which "provides information and links to city restaurants, hotels, attractions, and the city's social media feeds".

== Awards ==
- 2009 Young Entrepreneur Award
