= Strawberry Cubes =

2015 video game

- Developer: Loren Schmidt
- Platforms: Windows, MacOS
- Release: 4 July 2015
- Genre: Platformer
- Mode: Single-player

Strawberry Cubes is a 2015 video game by American independent developer Loren Schmidt, developed as an open-ended platformer that makes heavy use of glitches in its visual presentation and mechanics. The game received praise for its experimental and explorative qualities, and was showcased at several independent gaming events and galleries, including IndieCade.

== Gameplay ==
A screenshot of Strawberry Cubes.

Strawberry Cubes is an unorthodox platformer in which the player navigates a surrealistic maze. The game lacks a conventional control scheme, and players are encouraged to "try pressing other keys" on the keyboard, which have effects that include warping the player across the screen or to hidden rooms, or changing the visual presentation of the game. Navigation is assisted by collecting and planting "seeds", which sprout and allow the player to climb vertically. Without a user interface, the player is required to use context clues from the simulated glitches and bugs in the game to progress. There is no end to the game, and it is left to the player to explore the spaces in the game to uncover its features. There are hidden features and secrets in the game that refer to the overarching intent of the creator, including hidden messages and images in the game and its files.

== Development ==
Loren Schmidt is a Pittsburgh based independent developer who pursued art practice following a period of undergraduate study in biology and psychology. Schmidt initially developed Strawberry Cubes as a game for the Ludum Dare. The design of the game was initially inspired by Schmidt's desire to "make a game about my relationship with my grandmother, who suffered from Alzheimer's disease," and further driven by a personal goal to revisit and interrogate memories of her grandmother in terms of the "happy ones and memories of losing her gradually over seven years." In line with this theme, Schmidt stated the game was developed as an open-ended experience "consciously (without) a sense of achievement or mastery," and the game lacks a distinct end state, with Schmidt inviting the player to find meaning and closure to the game upon their own terms.

Strawberry Cubes was exhibited in New York City at the independent games festival IndieCade East in April 2016 at the Museum of the Moving Image, and at Fantastic Arcade in Austin, Texas, an event under Fantastic Fest, in September 2015. The game was also exhibited as part of a retrospective of Schmidt's work at the Pittsburgh gallery Like Like in July 2018. The game was also exhibited at independent games festival Fantastic Arcade at Austin in 2015.

== Reception ==
Strawberry Cubes received interest by several publications for its experimental and non-linear qualities. Writing for Kotaku, Patrick Klepek described the game as "unnerving" in its "mess of ideas and elements with promise and purpose not quite harmonized into a singular vision," praising the game for "rewarding observation" and allowing the player to exploit the glitches in the game. Alice O'Connor of Rock Paper Shotgun praised the game's exploration element, finding the presentation effective in making it "difficult (to) figure out what's intentional and what's wonky...(a) mysterious "Should I be seeing this? Should I be paying attention to this? Does this explain anything?" piece of the experience." Kill Screen described the game as "confusing but not impenetrable," stating "this is a game that works by keeping everything secret and telling you nothing." Other comments included from Polygon's Danielle Riendeau, who described the game as "weird, glitchy (and) gorgeous", and Laura Hudson of Boing Boing, who described the game as "the kind that unnerves you in subcutaneous, Lynchian ways you can't quite put your finger on."

Several reviews of Strawberry Cubes provided analysis of the game's relationship with the creator's experiences. Writing for Playboy Mike Rougeau, who had interviewed Schmidt on the personal meaning of the game, noted the disjointed presentation of the game evoked "(the) feeling of slowly losing connection," suggesting the game "is like peering into Schmidt's experience with her grandmother, or, probably more accurately, seeing how Schmidt imagines her grandmother may have experienced the world." Nick Fisher of Cult of Distraction similarly noted "the game may just well be an apt visual metaphor for such a disease - its world of blurring, shifting rooms and sprites definitely do feel like a symbolic expression for the slow, steady death of identity that such an affliction brings," although noting "parts of (the game) vibrate with other resonances - those of loss, of death, but also of dream-like childhood memoria."

Schmidt stated the game was a success, and was downloaded 10,000 times from its release from July 2015.
