= Wander (2015 video game) =

- Developer: Loki Davison
- Publisher: Loki Davison
- Designer: Loki Davison
- Engine: CryEngine
- Platforms: Windows, PlayStation 4
- Release: WW: June 4, 2015
- Genre: MMO

Wander was a narrative-focused massively multiplayer online game developed by Loki Davison and an independent team in Australia.

It was a short-lived MMO due to the lack of interest in the game and steadily low player base, and was quietly shut down in late 2015 after a last patch note was published in the game's website in September 2015, with an additional comment of Wander's Twitter account in December 2015 expressing the developers' interest in another update, which never came to fruition.

== Reception ==
Upon release, Wander was criticized for being buggy and incomplete. It got a 4/10 from Push Square.
