= Neon Struct =

2015 video game

- Developer: Minor Key Games
- Publisher: Minor Key Games
- Designer: David Pittman
- Composer: The Home Conversion
- Platforms: Windows, macOS, Linux, SteamOS
- Release: May 20, 2015
- Genre: Stealth game
- Mode: Single-player

NEON STRUCT: Die Augen der Welt (lit. 'NEON STRUCT: The Eyes of the World') is a first-person perspective stealth game developed and published by Minor Key Games for the PC Windows, macOS, and Linux/SteamOS in 2015.

== Gameplay ==
Neon Struct's gameplay is partially inspired by Deus Ex, with wide areas serving as a way for the player, in a first-person perspective, to complete objectives with some degree of freedom, mainly consisting of breaking into a specific place, obtaining a key item and successfully escaping without getting caught in the process. Neon Struct rewards the player more easily with the use of stealth and subterfuge rather than confrontation and brute force, making the first option more achievable.

== Plot ==
The first-person perspective is portrayed through the eyes of the protagonist, an ex-federal agent named Jillian Cleary who is being hunted down by her former agency. She, now as a fugitive must find a way to clear his name by performing some clandestine actions and counting on her allies, trustworthy or not.

== Reception ==
The game received mixed reviews for an averaged Metacritic score of 63/100. GameSpot's Justin Clark described it as "a Super FX chip version of Deus Ex" that "is a testament to the skill involved, but it simply can't help but suffer under the weight of its own ambitions." According to James Cunningham of Hardcore Gamer, Neon Struct "isn't a perfect game, and technically its main gameplay focus of stealth is fairly simplistic," but it "makes up for this by being excellent in many other ways, most notably in the level design and world building." Simon Parkin of Eurogamer lauded this it as a game that "creeps into politically charged themes of surveillance with grace and style" for its "brooding" storyline that makes it "the best kind of science fiction thriller: one dressed in the style of the future, but engaged with the pressing issues of the present."
