= Convoy (video game) =

2015 video game

- Developer: Convoy Games
- Publishers: Indietopia Games; Triangle Studios (NS, PS4, XONE)
- Platforms: Windows, OS X, Linux, Nintendo Switch, PlayStation 4, Xbox One
- Release: Windows, OS X, Linux; April 21, 2015; Nintendo Switch, PlayStation 4, Xbox One; April 8, 2018
- Genres: Roguelike, strategy
- Mode: Single-player

Convoy is a video game released on April 21, 2015 for Microsoft Windows, OS X, and Linux, and as Convoy: A Tactical Roguelike on April 8, 2020, for Nintendo Switch, PlayStation 4, and Xbox One under a revised format. The game features pixel art graphics and roguelike squad based tactical combat. In Convoy, the player must scour the wastelands of a desert planet in a defensively outfitted semi-trailer truck for parts to a crashed spaceship. The plot is experienced through interactive text based dialogue, where the player picks responses to written scenarios. The outcome of these scenarios sometimes turns in to tactical combat.

The game was part-funded through a Kickstarter campaign, raising €22,408 towards its development costs in November 2014.

== Reception ==
The game received a score of 72/100 on reviews aggregation website Metacritic, indicating mixed reviews. A 3.6 out of 5 stars on the good old games store. And a "Mostly Positive" Rating on the Steam Store.

Alec Meer, in his review at Rock, Paper, Shotgun described it as an "FTL on wheels", but found the game too unforgiving and with fewer options for the player to recover from disadvantaged positions. But did indicate that he was playing a pre release build of the game. And said "in fact it's already improved and tightened up across the couple of weeks I’ve been sporadically playing it for"
