= Makai Ichiban Kan =

Video game series

魔界1番館
- Genre: Adventure
- Video game

Trillion: God of Destruction
- Developer: Compile Heart
- Publisher: JP: Compile Heart; NA/EU: Idea Factory International
- Genre: Role-playing
- Platform: PlayStation Vita
- Released: JP: July 23, 2015; NA: March 29, 2016; EU: April 1, 2016
- Video game

MeiQ: Labyrinth of Death
- Developer: Compile Heart
- Publisher: JP: Compile Heart; NA/EU: Idea Factory International
- Genre: Role-playing, dungeon crawler
- Platform: PlayStation Vita
- Released: JP: December 17, 2015; NA: September 13, 2016; EU: September 16, 2016

Makai Ichiban Kan (魔界1番館, lit. "Number 1 House in Hell") is a video game project by Japanese developer Compile Heart. The project consists of multiple non-connected games which were developed as part of Compile Heart's branding for titles created by their newly established development team, and is directed by Masahiro Yamamato, with character designs by Kei Nanameda and music by Tenpei Sato. The first game developed as part of the project, Trillion: God of Destruction (魔壊神トリリオン, Makai Shin Toririon), was released on the PlayStation Vita on July 23, 2015.

== Trillion: God of Destruction ==
Trillion: God of Destruction is the first game within the Makai Ichiban Kan line of games. It was released on July 23, 2015 in Japan, March 29, 2016 in North America, and April 1, 2016 in Europe.

== MeiQ: Labyrinth of Death ==
MeiQ: Labyrinth of Death (メイQノ地下ニ死ス, MeiQ no Chika ni Shisu, "Death Under the Labyrinth") is the second game within the Makai Ichiban Kan line of games, announced for release on the PlayStation Vita. It is a dungeon crawl video game.
