= List of Ouya software =

This is a partial list of software for the Ouya video game console, from a total of 1,250 games as of June 2019.

The Ouya's operating system (OS) is based on the Android OS.

Without sideloading software or using exploits to install software, the Ouya can only run games that are offered through its own storefront. These titles were originally required to have some type of free content, like demos, or being free-to-play with micro-transactions. This rule was soon removed.

== Games ==
Title	Developer(s)	Release date	Ouya exclusive
100 Rogues	Dinofarm Games under Fusion Reactions	August 2013	
123 Animal First Grade Math Games for Kids	Eggroll Games	January 2015	
123 Animal Math Games for Kids	Eggroll Games	December 2014	
123 Animal Preschool Games for Kids	Eggroll Games	December 2014	
123 Animal Second Grade Math Games for Kids	Eggroll Games	January 2015	
20.8 Percent	OMGWTFGAMES !1!!	November 2013	
2048	Graham Weldon	March 2014	
2064: Read Only Memories	MidBoss	January 2016	
Abbigale And The Monster	Renegadeware	March 2013	
Age of Zombies	Halfbrick Studios	March 2015	
Amazing Frog?	Fayju	March 2013	
Another World (Sci-fi adventure)	DotEmu SAS	September 2016	
Astronaut Rescue	Octograb Studio	June 2013	
A Space Shooter for 2 Bucks	Frima Studio	March 27, 2013	
Asteroid Ace	Obelisk Entertainment (OEGames)	June 2013	
AVP: Evolution	Fox Digital Entertainment Inc	October 2013	
Bababadalgharaghtakamminarronnkonnbronntonnerronn tuonnthunntrovarrhounawnskawntoohoohoordenenthurnuk	Terry Cavanagh	launch title	
Bacteria - Arcade Edition'	SinisterSoft Limited	July 2013	
The Ball	Tripwire Interactive	March 2013	
The Bard's Tale'	InXile Entertainment	May 2013	
Beast Boxing Turbo	Goodhustle Studios	June 2013	
Black Hole	Dufgames	May 2016	
Bombball	E McNeill	October 2013	
BombSquad	Eric Froemling	June 25, 2013	
The Bridge	The Quantum Astrophysicists Guild	August 2015	
Broken Age	Double Fine Productions	May 2015	
Bubbliminate	Voxoid	September 2013	
Bullfist	Terry Cavanagh	June 2013	
The Cave	Double Fine Productions	December 2, 2013	
Canabalt HD	Kittehface Software	March 28, 2013	
Catlateral Damage	Chris Chung	June 11, 2015	
Chess 2: The Sequel	Ludeme Games	February 2014	
Choplifter HD	inXile Entertainment	August 2013	
ChronoBlade Demo	nWay Games	October 2013	
Deus Ex Machina Game of the Year 30th Anniversary Collector's Edition	Potassium Frog Ltd.	February 2015	
DiveBomb Chomp	Beau James Games	August 2014	
Don't Look Back	Terry Cavanagh	June 2013	
Donkey ME (Donkey Kong - like platformer)	Bruno R. Marcos	November 2013	
DONUT GET!	Sokay LLC	March 2013	
Drawing Universe	Alex Tritt Games	October 2013	
Duck Game (Sci-fi MP combat shooter)	Landon Podbielski	December 2014	
Dropchord	Double Fine Productions	July 2013	
Echoes of Eternia	E.o.E.Games	May 2013	
E.F.M.B.: Endless Forms Most Beautiful (Platformer)	Dave Hughes / Locomalito	July 2012	
Egypt Reels of Luxor	Software Amusements	June 2013	
Emoji World OUYA	JDSoft	May 2014	
Emoji World 2: The Zodiac Quest	JDSoft	May 2015	
Endica VII The Dream King'	Dream Within Studios	2014	
Fester Mudd: Episode 1	Replay Games	June 2013	
Fighting Is Magic	Mane6	2014	
Final Fantasy III	Square Enix	March 2013	
Fist of Awesome	I Fight Bears	October 15, 2013	
Flappy Bird	Dong Nguyen	2014	
Flashout 3D (Sci-fi racing game)	Jujubee S.A.	April 2013	
Flashout 2	Jujubee S.A.	January 2015	
Flip Riders	Desura LLC	July 2013	
Fotonica	Santa Ragione	December 2013	
Freedroid	Marcus Comstedt	January 2014	
Gaurodan (Horizontal SHMUP)	Locomalito	July 2013	
Get on Top!	Deep Plaid Games LLC	November 2013	
Giana Sisters	Bad Monkee	April 2013	
Giana Sisters: Twisted Dreams	Black Forest Games	TBA	
God of Blades	White Whale Games, LLC	March 2013	
Gravi	Hashbang Games	July 2013	
Gulag (Side-scrolling military action shooter)	Duston Allen	January 2016	
Gunblitz	Rapture Game Studios	March 2013	
Hero of Many	Trickster Arts	October 2013	
Human Element Prequel (Unnamed)	Robotoki	2015	
Hyper Light Drifter	Heart Machine	2014	
Ice Rage	Mountain Sheep, Inc.	October 2013	
It's Nothing	JDSoft	October 2015	
Ittle Dew	Ludosity	September 2013	
Joe Danger	Hello Games	April 2015	
Killing Floor: Calamity	Tripwire Interactive	December 2013	
Kinetic Assault	Barrett Games	December 2013	
King of Booze	Daygames	March 2013	
Knightmare Tower	Juicy Beast Studio	July 2014	
L'Abbaye des Morts	Locomalito	September 2014	
Left 2Die	Guilherme Daniel Molin	July 2014	
Legend of Dungeon	RobotLovesKitty	March 2013	
Legends of Aethereus	ThreeGates	TBA	
Lowrider Car Game	Stop4Sanity Games	September 2013	
Magic Rampage (Medieval platformer)	Asantee Games	October 2015	
Maldita Castilla (Cursed Castile) (Ghosts'n Goblins - like platformer)	Locomalito	October 2013	
Meltdown (Sci-fi combat shooter)	Phenomenon Games	December 2014	
Mercenary Kings	Tribute Games	September 2016	
Luanti (Formally Minetest)	Ezra Anderson	October 2014	
Miracle Fly	ElagoTech	January 2015	
MirrorMoon EP	Santa Ragione	April 2014	
MouseCraft	Crunching Koalas	April 2015	
Muzzle to Muzzle	Ouroboros Softworks	February 2016	
Neon Shadow	Tasty Poison Games	December 2015	
Neverending Nightmares	Infitap Games LLC	June 2016	
Nimble Quest	Nimblebit LLC	July 2013	
Oddworld: Munch's Oddysee	Oddworld Inhabitants Inc.	November 2015	
Oddworld: Stranger's Wrath	Oddworld Inhabitants Inc.	November 2015	
Offensive Combat	U4iA Games	TBA	
OpenArena: Ouya Edition	Gamesboro	October 2013	
Organ Trail: Director's Cut	The Men Who Wear Many Hats LLC	June 2013	
Party Golf	Giant Margarita	October 2015	
Pier Solar HD	WaterMelon Co.	December 2013	
Pipnis	Santa Ragione	TBA	
R-Type	DotEmu SAS	October 2015	
Raiden: Legacy (Vertical Sci-fi SHMUP)	DotEmu SAS	May 2015	
Ravensword: Shadowlands	Crescent Moon Games	June 2014	
Reaper	David Peroutka	October 2013	
Rival Threads: Last Class Heroes	Studio Kontrabida	TBA	
Rose and Time	Sophie Houlden	July 2013	
Saturday Morning RPG	Mighty Rabbit Studios	August 2013	
Shadow Blade	Crescent Moon Games	March 4, 2014	
Shadowgun	MADFINGER Games	June 2013	
Shadowrun Online	Cliffhanger Productions	November 2013	
Sine Mora	Digital Reality and Grasshopper Manufacture	August 2013	
Skulls of the Shogun	17-BIT	November 2014	
Slide Tap Pop'	CodeRunners	July 2013	
So Many Me	Extend Studio & ORiGO Games	July 2014	
Soccertron	David Erosa	August 2014	
Somyeol HD	Brain Connected	October 2013	
Sonic the Hedgehog 4: Episode I	Sega	July 8, 2013	
Sonic the Hedgehog 4: Episode II	Sega	July 8, 2013	
Sonic the Hedgehog CD	Sega	August 1, 2013	
Soul Fjord	Airtight Games	January 28, 2014	
Stash: No Loot Left Behind	FrogDice	TBA	
Star Breaker	Petrus-Games	2013	
Stikbold	Team Stikbold	2013	
Strange Happenings on Murder Island	Free lives	TBA	
Super Crate Box	Vlambeer	June 2013	
Super Indie Karts	One Legged Seagull	March 2017	
Super Retro Squad	Exploding Rabbit	2014	
Survival Ball	Rockbyte Software	September 2013	
Television	Laboratory Games LLC	TBA	
TerraGenesis	Tilting Point	April 4, 2018	
That Dragon, Cancer	Ryan and Amy Green	2014	
Toto Temple Deluxe	Juicy Beast Studio	July 2014	
TowerFall	Maddy Thorson	June 2013	
Towerfall: Ascension	Maddy Thorson	November 2016	
Tropical Treasures 2 Deluxe'	Software Amusements	July 2013	
Tux Racer	moonlite	February 2014	
Ur-Quan Masters HD	pelya	October 2013	
Vacant Sky Awakening	Project BC	TBA	
Vendetta Online	Guild Software	Before retail release	
Verminian Trap (Sci-fi survival)	Locomalito	September 2013	
The Vestibule	Project BC	April 3, 2013	
The Walking Dead: Season One	Telltale Games	Q1 2014	
The Walking Dead: Season Two	Telltale Games	TBA	
Whispering Willows	Night Light Interactive	May 27, 2014	
Wizorb	Tribute Games	March 28, 2013	
Wrecking Balls Arena	Team Kakumei	August 2013	
VVVVVV	Terry Cavanagh	June 2014	
You Don't Know Jack	Jackbox Games	June 11, 2013	
Zombie Driver HD	Exor Studios	August 2013	

== Emulators ==
Title	Developer(s)	Emulated device	Release date
2600.emu	Robert Broglia	Atari 2600	June 2015
C64.emu	Robert Broglia	Commodore 64	June 2015
D-GLES	Michael Ryssen	Doom	March 2015
EMUya	Oriku Inc	Nintendo Entertainment System, Game Boy, Atari 2600, Super Nintendo Entertainment System	March 2013
FPse	Emusoft	PlayStation	September 2013
FrodoC64	Paul Lamb	Commodore 64	TBA
GBA.emu	Robert Broglia	Game Boy Advance	June 2015
GBC.emu	Robert Broglia	Game Boy, Game Boy Color	June 2015
HereticGLES	Michael Ryssen	Heretic	May 2015
MAME4Droid (0.139U1)	David Valdeita Loureiro	MAME	January 2015
MD.emu	Robert Broglia	Mega Drive (Genesis)	June 2015
Mupen64Plus Ouya	Paul Lamb	Nintendo 64	March 2013
MSX.emu	Robert Broglia	MSX, Colecovision	June 2015
NEO.emu	Robert Broglia	Neo Geo	June 2015
nds4droid	emozilla	Nintendo DS	April 2013
NES.emu	Robert Broglia	Nintendo Entertainment System	June 2015
NGP.emu	Robert Broglia	Neo Geo Pocket Color	June 2015
PCE.emu	Robert Broglia	TurboGrafx-16 (PC Engine)	June 2015
reicast	nillware	Dreamcast	May 2014
RetroArch	Libretro	Various games consoles and game engines such as Doom, 2048 and Cave Story	March 2014
ScummVM	ScummVM Project	SCUMM	October 2016
Snes9x EX Plus	Robert Broglia	Super Nintendo Entertainment System	June 2015
SuperGNES	Bubble Zap Games	Super Nintendo Entertainment System	March 2013

== Media ==
Title	Developer(s)	Release date
Crunchyroll	The Chernin Group and TV Tokyo	November 2013
iHeartRadio	Clear Channel Communications	March 2013
OnAir Player	OnAir Player Inc.	September 2014
Plex Media Center	Plex, Inc.	June 2013
TuneIn	TuneIn Inc	April 2013
Twitch	Justin.tv	March 2013
Vevo	Google	TBA
Vimeo	Vimeo	June 2014
Visit Florida	Future Today Inc	August 2016
Washington Post Video	The Washington Post	October 2015
XBMC Media Center	Team-XBMC and XBMC Foundation	March 2013
YouTube	Google	2014

== Software ==
Name	Type	Developer(s)	Release date
AIDE for OUYA	Integrated Development Environment (IDE) for Java and libGDX	Appfour	August 2014
AutoPilot	Startup utility	Jon Bonazza	May 2013
Clock	Clock utility	MrMaw	June 2013
FilePwn	Navigational file manager	littleguy77	March 2014
Foresight	Weather application that uses DarkSky	Matthew Oakes	July 2013
Just Rain	Clock application with ASMR	Robysoft	June 2014

== Operating systems ==
Debian and Ubuntu Linux have been installed and run on the Ouya.

== Never released ==
Title	Developer(s)	Explanation
AirMech	Carbon Games	Coding for an Ouya port was streamed live on Twitch but the game was never released onto the Ouya store.
Asphalt 6: Adrenaline	Gameloft Barcelona	Seen in the official OUYA Brand Guide.
The Banner Saga: Factions	Stoic Studio	Initially announced for Ouya, however the developers later stated that it would not be released on anything else other than Microsoft Windows or OS X.
Dead Trigger	MADFINGER Games	Seen on the Kickstarter page video.
Fez	Polytron Corporation	Initially announced for Ouya, but was never ported to the system.
Grand Theft Auto III	Rockstar Games	Julie Uhrman hinted at the possibility.
Human Element	Robotoki	Seen in the official OUYA Brand Guide.
Journey	Thatgamecompany	Seen in the official OUYA Brand Guide.
Madden NFL 12	EA Tiburon	Seen on the Kickstarter page video.
Minecraft	Mojang	FAQ alluded to the possibility of porting Minecraft to the system if there was a large consumer base.
Mini Motor Racing	The Binary Mill	Seen in the official OUYA Brand Guide.
Mirror's Edge	EA	Seen in the official OUYA Brand Guide.
NBA Jam	EA Sports	Seen in the official OUYA Brand Guide.
Need For Speed: Hot Pursuit	Criterion Games	Seen in the official OUYA Brand Guide.
Racing Live	Storm8 Games	Seen on the Kickstarter page video.
Samurai II: Vengeance	MADFINGER Games	Seen on the Kickstarter page video.
Starbound	Chucklefish	Was voted for on an OUYA kickstarter campaign for games fans would like to see brought to OUYA. A Dev Kit was sent to Chucklefish but the game was never ported for OUYA.
Triple Town	Spry Fox LLC	Seen on the Kickstarter page video.

== See also ==
- Ouya
- List of OnLive video games
