= Black hole (disambiguation) =

A black hole is a region of extreme gravitational pull.

Black hole or blackhole may also refer to:

== Computing ==
- Black hole (networking), in computer networking, a place where traffic is silently discarded
- Blackhole server, a DNS server that handles reverse lookups of invalid IP ranges
- A storage engine provided by MySQL data

== Film and television ==
- The Black Hole (1979 film), a science fiction film
- Black Holes (film), a 1995 film
- The Black Hole (2006 film), a science fiction film
- Black Hole (2015 film), a documentary film
- The Black Hole (2016 film), a science fiction thriller
- "Black Hole" (House), a 2010 episode of House
- "Black Hole" (The Ren & Stimpy Show), an episode of the American TV series The Ren & Stimpy Show
- Black Hole, a fictional contestant in two seasons of Battle for Dream Island

== Games ==
- Black Hole (pinball), a 1981 pinball machine manufactured by Gottlieb
- Blackhole (video game), a 2015 video game by FiolaSoft Studio
- Black Hole (2016 video game), a video game by Dufgames
- Black Hole (solitaire), a solitaire card game
- Black Hole Entertainment, a video game developer
- Black Hole (board game), a 1978 two-player space combat game published by Metagaming Concepts
- A faction in the Advance Wars games

== Music ==
- Black Hole Recordings, a record label
- Blackhole (band), a British hardcore punk band

=== Albums ===
- The Black Hole (album), by Misty's Big Adventure
- Black Holes (album), by The Blue Stones

=== Songs ===
- "Black Hole" (song), a song by Griff from One Foot in Front of the Other, 2021
- "Black Hole", by Ana Johnsson from The Way I Am, 2004
- "Black Hole", by Lindsay Lohan from A Little More Personal (Raw), 2005
- "Black Hole", by 3OH!3 from Omens, 2013
- "Black Hole", by The Browning from Hypernova, 2013
- "Black Hole", by Wussy from What Heaven Is Like, 2018
- "Black Hole", by Band-Maid from Unseen World, 2021
- "Black Hole", by Betraying the Martyrs from Silver Lining, 2022
- "Black Hole", by We Came as Romans from Darkbloom, 2022
- "Black Hole", by Lil Uzi Vert from Eternal Atake 2, 2024
- "Black Hole", by Funker Vogt, 2025
- "Black Hole", by the Happy Fits from Lovesick, 2025
- "Blackhole" (song), a song by Ive from Revive+, 2026
- "Blackhole", by Beck from Mellow Gold, 1994
- "Blackhole", by Psy'Aviah from Eclectric, 2010
- "Blackhole", by Architects from The Sky, the Earth & All Between, 2025
- "The Black Hole", by Horse the Band from The Mechanical Hand, 2005

== Places ==
- Black Hole of Calcutta, a dungeon in which many British troops and various civilians allegedly died in 1756
- Black Hole of Hong Kong, a prison cell in which 47 Chinese men were detained for three weeks during the Esing Bakery incident of 1857
- A section of White Canyon, Utah

== Other uses ==
- Black Hole (comics), a limited series comic by Charles Burns
- Black Hole (DC Comics), a fictional terrorist organization
- Black Hole (Kinnikuman), a character in the manga and anime Kinnikuman
- Black Hole (roller coaster), a (defunct) rollercoaster at Alton Towers
- Black Hole, a character from the fourth season of Battle for Dream Island, an animated web series
- A sensory illusion in aviation
- A surplus store in Los Alamos, New Mexico, operated by Ed Grothus
- An area of the home stadium of the Las Vegas Raiders

== See also ==
- DNSBL (DNS-based Black Hole List), a list used to block spamming IP addresses
- BTZ black hole, a black hole solution in 2+1 dimensional topological gravity
- Direct collapse black hole, a cosmological object
- Micro black hole, a black hole on a quantum level or with quantum effects
- Primordial black hole, a hypothetical type of black hole
- Stellar black hole, a black hole formed by a collapsed star
- Intermediate-mass black hole, a class of black hole
- Supermassive black hole, a black hole with mass above 10⁵ solar masses, usually found at the centers of galaxies
- Black hole cosmology, a cosmological model in which the observable universe is the interior of a black hole
- Black hole thermodynamics, an area of physical study that seeks to reconcile the laws of thermodynamics with the existence of black hole event horizons
