= Noctis =

Noctis is Latin for "of night".

Noctis may also refer to:

- Noctis Labyrinthus, a region of Mars
- Noctis (video game), a 2000 space flight simulator
- Noctis Lucis Caelum, a character from the video game Final Fantasy XV
