= Hackers (video game) =

2016 video game

- Developer: Trickster Arts
- Publisher: Trickster Arts
- Designer: Matouš J
- Programmers: body Týč; Martin Hanzl
- Composers: Matúš Široký; Marek Horváth
- Engine: Unity
- Platforms: Android iOS
- Release: 19 September 2016
- Genre: Strategy
- Modes: Single-player, multiplayer

Hackers is an independent strategy game developed by Trickster Arts for Android and iOS. Hackers is a cyberwarfare strategy game, and has been likened to the video game Uplink. On iOS, the game has an added suffix: Hackers - Join the Cyberwar.

== Gameplay ==
A screenshot from the game. Players get to design a network of offensive and defensive nodes as they fight for their countries in a futuristic world war.

Players take on the role of a Hacker during a fictional First World Cyberwar. Players can develop and secure their own virtual 3D network and hack various targets around the world. Players can research programs and hack networks to increase their reputation and resources, and compete against other countries. The overarching strategy is to build a robust enough network to protect your data, while finding the best tools to use against others. The game features 70+ story missions with multiple ways to defeat them. There are also player-created networks to be infiltrated, which raises the position of your country on the global leaderboard. The game also has a developed ARG, starting from an in-game mission.

=== Plot ===
Hackers takes place in an alternate reality, where a piece of software (codenamed Ergo) was designed to make hacking into systems easier. The software has been made available to the public, so that anyone and everyone can get into hacking. But unlike real-world hacking which consists of command line usage and programming, this alternate reality puts systems and the hacking process into a GUI (graphical user interface) to make things easier to try and hack other people.

The game starts you out performing simple hacks with a recently met acquaintance called "Marty". As the game progresses, you are introduced to other characters representing various factions such as StormCorp, MIRAGE, Cyber Alliance, Eastern Coalition and DejaVu. During the course of the story, you get to experience various security, activist and terrorist missions that test your skills as a hacker.

== Development ==
The game was developed in-house by Trickster Arts. The game was developed in Unity Engine. Development was started in Summer 2014. While working on Hero of Many, the developers started working in parallel on another project. This project was cancelled for design reasons and Hackers was created from old gaming design notes out of the desire to keep the company going. Hackers was announced at Game Access '16 on 16 April 2016.

The music was composed by Matúš Široký. The Hackers: Original Soundtrack was released via Bandcamp on October 5, 2017. Sounds were produced by Marek Horváth.

== Reception ==
Reception

Aggregate score
Aggregator	Score
Metacritic	--/100

Review scores
Publication	Score
--	--%
--	--%
--	--%

As of 27 September 2016, Hackers is featured globally by Apple on the front page of "New Games We Love" and, as of 13 November 2016, by Google Play in the "New Games" section in 23 countries. On 27 January 2017, Hackers was nominated for "Czech game of the year for Mobile Devices" at the annual Czech Game of the Year Awards. On 26 April 2017, Hackers was nominated for "Mobile Application of the Year 2017" at the annual Mobilní Aplikace Roku awards. As of 6 October 2017, Hackers has received 4 million downloads.
