= MirrorMoon EP =

2013 video game

- Developer: Santa Ragione
- Publisher: Santa Ragione
- Engine: Unity
- Platforms: Linux, macOS, Windows, Ouya, Amazon Fire TV
- Release: 4 September 2013 (PC); April 2014 (Ouya)
- Genre: Adventure
- Mode: Single-player

MirrorMoon EP is a 2013 video game developed and published by Santa Ragione, a studio based in Milan, Italy. It is an exploration game set in space. It is based on a 2012 game, Mirror Moon, that was developed during a game jam. The game was inspired by Noctis IV, another Italian indie game. As of October 2013, the game has sold 8,000 copies.

== Reception ==
Reception

Aggregate score
| Aggregator | Score |
|---|---|
| Metacritic | 73/100 |

Review scores
| Publication | Score |
|---|---|
| 4Players | 85/100 |
| Destructoid | 6/10 |
| Eurogamer | 9/10 |
| Hardcore Gamer | 3.5/5 |
| IGN | 7/10 |
| The Games Machine (Italy) | 4/5 (game jam) |
| Multiplayer.it | 7.5/10 |

Eurogamer wrote: "It's Noctis by way of Proteus, and it's also one of the purest exploration games I've ever played: a genuine thing of wonder." Destructoid said: "MirrorMoon EP is a great concept that’s marred by the game’s insistence on making even basic navigation and orientation a puzzle to figure out." Hardcore Gamer said the game is "[...] filled with beautiful sights, and while it can get a bit repetitive after a while, it's worth setting out just to see what you can find."
