= Knightmare =

Knightmare may refer to:

- Knightmare (TV series), a British television series
  - Knightmare (1987 video game), a video game based on the television series
  - Knightmare (1991 video game), a video game based on the television series
- Knightmare (1986 video game), a video game by Konami for the MSX
  - Shalom: Knightmare III, a 1987 video game
- Knightmare (roller coaster), a defunct roller coaster in Chorley, Lancashire, United Kingdom
- A potential dystopian future featured in the DC Extended Universe films Batman v Superman: Dawn of Justice and Zack Snyder's Justice League

== See also ==
- Knight (disambiguation)
- Nightmare (disambiguation)
- Knightmare Chess, a chess variant
- Knightmare Frame, a mecha in the anime television series Code Geass
- Knightmare Tower, a 2013 video game
