= Rose and Time =

2012 video game

- Developer: Sophie Houlden
- Composer: Kevin MacLeod
- Platforms: iOS, Android, Ouya, Windows, Mac, Linux
- Release: April 2012
- Genre: Puzzle-platform

Rose and Time is a puzzle-platform game by British video game developer Sophie Houlden with music by Kevin MacLeod. The player navigates 3D levels while avoiding previous versions of themselves created by time travel. Rose and Time was released in April 2012 for iOS and Android after being created as part of the Indie Buskers Game Jam. It was also released on Ouya in July 2013. The game concept originated from a competition idea submitted by Scott Thomas Smith.

== Gameplay ==
The player controls Rose, a young girl in pursuit of a time crystal which she believes will give her the ability to understand time travel, and rescue her parents who are trapped in a time loop. Each stage consists of a series of floating platforms and mechanisms she must navigate to reach the crystal. Upon reaching the crystal, you travel back in time to the start of the level, to find yourself and the crystal are in different positions, and you now have to avoid your past self (and her line of sight) to reach the crystal without causing a time paradox. Many later levels involve managing several versions of your past self, and using them to hold buttons activating doors and platforms.

Aside from moving, the only actions Rose can perform are covering her eyes (to create blind spots for her future selves to pass through) and rewinding time to an earlier point to correct mistakes.

== Ouya controversy ==
In September 2013, Sophie voluntarily withdrew the game from the Ouya marketplace, citing problems with the mishandling of the Ouya "Free the Games Fund" controversy, and assorted missteps by the company. The story was widely circulated in the gaming press, and further fueled criticism of the fund.

A month later, Sophie revealed that she and several other developers had been in talks with Ouya boss Julie Uhrman, and that the terms of the Free the Games Fund had been changed as a result. Satisfied the matter was resolved, she returned the game to the Ouya marketplace. Sophie also expressed regret for setting up the initial blog post to become "a story" and criticized game journalists for twisting the removal post to "fit [their] narrative."
