= Beast Boxing 3D =

2010 video game

- Developer: Goodhustle Studios
- Designer: Gordon Luk
- Artist: Khang Le
- Platforms: iOS, macOS, Ouya, Windows
- Release: October 28, 2010 (iOS)
- Genre: Sports
- Mode: Single-player

Beast Boxing 3D was a 2010 indie boxing video game developed by Goodhustle Studios and released for iOS mobile devices. The player takes the role of Char, a human female boxer who seeks to become the champion of the Beast Boxing Leagues. A remake titled Beast Boxing Turbo was released for macOS, Ouya, and Windows. Beast Boxing Turbo was delisted from Steam in 2019 following the closure of Goodhustle Studios.

== Plot ==
Char, a human female boxer from the slums, seeks to become the champion of the Beast Boxing Leagues; boxing leagues for monsters. Humans are looked down upon by monsters and aren't allowed into the leagues, thus she begins her boxing career by entering the leagues in a monster costume. Char is coached by Piglas, a pig monster aware that she's a human. Char defeats the champions of the Bush League, Pro League, and Ultra League. After Char defeats Darbech, the reigning champion of the Ultra League, he is revealed to also be a human in disguise.

== Gameplay ==
In Beast Boxing, the player takes the role of Char, a human female boxer who aspires to become the champion of the Beast Boxing Leagues. To win a match, the player must win by knockout two out of three rounds with their opponent. The player must defeat the champions of the Bush League, Pro League, and Ultra League, ultimately becoming the reigning champion of the Ultra League. Beast Boxing 3D has nine opponents with two additional ones added in later updates, while Beast Boxing Turbo has twelve. The player can deliver hooks by moving left or right while punching; Beast Boxing 3D uses swipe controls to perform different types of punches, and moving around the ring is controlled by tilting the device through accelerometer-based motion controls. Jabs are quick, while hooks and uppercuts deal more damage but take longer to swing. The guard meter shows how likely an opponent is to block against attacks, represented by a boxing glove icon below their portrait being up or down. Opponents block moves more often if the player uses them repetitively, requiring the player to use different strategies. Piglas gives the player advice throughout each fight.

Both attacking and blocking use power, which can also be depleted by being hit. Running out of power causes fatigue, causing the player to lose their streak progress and temporarily move more slowly. The player's streak meter increases with each hit delivered to the opponent, but is lost if the player is hit or their power is depleted. Upon reaching maximum streak, the player temporarily gains unlimited power and deals more damage with each hit. By attacking and not being hit, the player can build up a combo. Health regenerates slowly over time, except for damage marked in red, which is restored in the following round.

Coins are awarded after each match, and previously beaten opponents can be refought in exhibition matches. Coins may be used to buy permanent stat upgrades and armor. Temporary power-ups, such as the ability to slow down time and health boosts, can be purchased and used in fights; this is absent in Beast Boxing Turbo. In Beast Boxing Turbo, New Game+ is unlocked after completing story mode, causing enemies to be stronger while retaining the player's gear and stat upgrades. In Endless mode, the player attempts to defeat as many opponents as possible without losing a fight, with scores going on an online leaderboard.

== Development ==
The prototype of Beast Boxing 3D was initially titled Monster Boxing. Beast Boxing 3D was announced in February 2010, and was released on October 28, 2010, for iOS. Beast Boxing 3D was originally released with nine different opponents, and additional holiday-themed opponents were added in later updates. The game's Endless gamemode was also added in an update.

Beast Boxing Turbo was greenlit on Steam Greenlight, and was released on Steam in October 2013. Beast Boxing Turbo was delisted from Steam on March 29, 2019, due to the closure of Goodhustle Studios.

Gordon Luk, the designer of Beast Boxing, described Beast Boxing Turbo as "a complete redesign" of Beast Boxing 3D rather than a port, stating that he used "two years of player feedback to eliminate things that weren't fun and replace them with improved game design and feel". Turbo adds an additional three holiday-themed opponents between the Pro League and Ultra League (including two previously added in updates to Beast Boxing 3D), as well as a New Game+ mode, new artwork, mechanics, and story. In Beast Boxing 3D, Char is revealed to be a woman at the end of the game, rather than from the beginning as with Turbo; Luk stated that this change "made the story better, and it was easier to identify with the protagonist if the audience was in on her secret from the beginning".

Beast Boxing was inspired by Punch-Out!!, Zeno Clash, and Hajime No Ippo.

== Reception ==
Reception

Review scores
Publication	Score
AppSpy	4/5 (iOS)
148Apps	4.5/5 (iOS)
Pocket Gamer	8/10 (iOS)
Slide to Play	3/4 (iOS)
TouchArcade	4.5/5 (iOS)
Macworld	4/5 (iOS)
Gamezebo	3/5 (Windows, Mac)

Many reviewers favorably compared Beast Boxing to Punch-Out!!. Reviews praised Beast Boxing's visuals, with several reviews noting the game's animations as 'smooth'. AppSpy praised Beast Boxing 3D's "intuitive" gameplay, as well as its "gorgeous" visuals, calling its animations "smooth" and describing the level of detail as "simply stunning". 148Apps praised the game's AI and controls, and described the game's opponents as being "extremely detailed with smooth animations". Gizmodo stated that the game "oozes style".

Pocket Gamer described Beast Boxing 3D's' gameplay as "intuitive and addictive", and praised its "incredibly detailed" graphics and "beautifully fluid animation[s]" Gamezebo was more critical, stating that "despite giving the impression of depth, there really isn't much to the fighting action at all, besides hammering two buttons over and over", criticizing its gameplay as brief and shallow but praised its "great visuals". Slide To Play summarized the game as having "excellent controls, [a] fun upgrade system, and eye-catching graphics", further calling it "an impressive game on many levels", but criticized the game's brevity. TouchArcade called it "an absolutely gorgeous game", praising the game's need for combos and strategy due to the game's AI, expressing that the AI adapting to the player's moves gives the game a "natural feel that increases the replay value".

Macworld praised Beast Boxing 3D's gameplay, calling it "wonderfully executed" and stating that it has "great use of touch controls".

The Mary Sue noted Char as a good example of positive female representation in games, and praised the game's focus on combos and strategy, stating that "The reason Beast Boxing Turbo will appeal to women who already like boxing games is because it's a good boxing game".
