= Kara Nortman =

American businesswoman

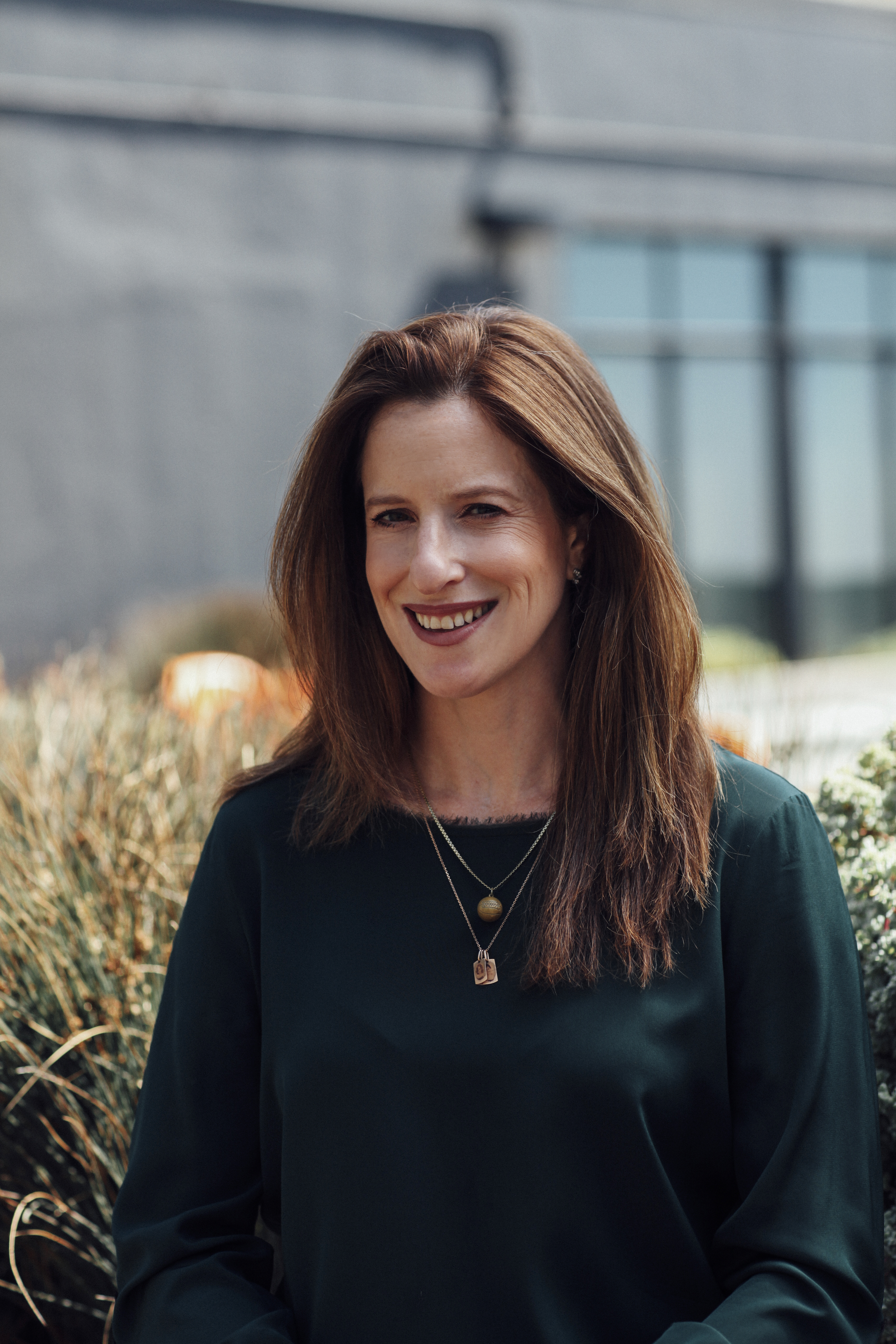

Kara Elyse Nortman (born 1976 or 1977) is an American venture capitalist, founder and managing partner of Monarch Collective, and co-founder of National Women's Soccer League (NWSL) club Angel City FC.

== Education ==
Nortman graduated from Princeton University with a bachelor's of arts degree in politics, and from Stanford University with a master's in business administration.

== Career ==
In March 2023, Nortman announced the creation of Monarch Collective, a sports venture capital fund led by herself and Jasmine Robinson with a focus on women's teams, leagues, and business opportunities. Investors in the $100 million initial raise included former tennis player Billie Jean King, Alphabet Inc. venture capital leader Laela Sturdy, and former Netflix president Cindy Holland.

=== Sports ownership ===
In 2020, Nortman co-founded NWSL expansion club Angel City FC with Julie Uhrman, Natalie Portman. Nortman recruited Portman after watching a United States women's national soccer team friendly match together, and recruited Uhrman from a women-in-tech basketball club to which they both belonged and that Nortman had helped to launch. Nortman also consulted with U.S. Women's National Team Players Association executive director Becca Roux on the business potential of women's soccer.

In its initial season, Angel City FC sold 16,000 season tickets, averaged more than 19,000 attendance per match, and sold $11 million in corporate partnerships and $35 million in total sponsorship revenue. Its corporate partnership revenue was larger than seven Major League Soccer teams and approached the value of teams in the National Hockey League and Major League Baseball. Angel City FC's expansion fees were reportedly between $2 million and $5 million. In an April 2021 fundraise, Angel City FC was reportedly valued at more than $100 million.

=== Venture capital ===
In 2014, Nortman joined Upfront Ventures, a Los Angeles, California-based venture capital firm. Nortman's investments included Parachute Home, Writer, Laurel, Fleetsmith (acquired by Apple), Strive Talent (acquired by Franklin Covey). In 2020, Upfront promoted Nortman as one of three co-managing partners. In 2022, she reportedly stepped back from investing at Upfront to focus on Angel City FC.

=== Executive management ===
Nortman worked for seven years at InterActiveCorp (IAC), where she served in executive roles for mergers and acquisitions and oversaw the acquisitions of Urbanspoon and Dictionary.com. She later served IAC as an executive at its holdings Urbanspoon and Citysearch. At IAC, she also sat on the board of startup incubator Hatch Labs and recruited dating app Tinder and its founder Sean Rad. Following IAC, she co-founded children's creativity startup Moonfrye with Soleil Moon Frye.

Prior to IAC, Nortman also worked for Morgan Stanley, Microsoft, and as a venture capitalist for Battery Ventures.

=== Advocacy ===
Nortman co-founded All Raise, a gender-equality group of venture capitalists attempting to increase diversity among venture funds and entrepreneurship.

== Personal life ==
Nortman resides in Los Angeles, California. Nortman married Jake Blumenthal in 2007 and has three daughters.
