= Retro/Grade =

2012 video game

- Developer: 24 Caret Games
- Publisher: 24 Caret Games
- Designer: Matt Gilgenbach
- Composer: Skyler McGlothlin
- Platforms: PlayStation 3 Microsoft Windows
- Release: PlayStation 3; 21 August 2012; Microsoft Windows; 20 March 2013
- Genres: Rhythm, shoot 'em up
- Mode: Single-player

Retro/Grade is a video game developed by 24 Caret Games. The game is about ace pilot Rick Rocket, who must repeat his last space battle in reverse in order to protect the space time continuum. The game play is rhythm-based and timed to original music by Skyler McGlothlin. In January 2009, it was nominated for two Independent Games Festival awards: Excellence in Audio and Excellence in Design. In October 2010, it won the Audience Choice Award at IndieCade.

== Gameplay ==
The gameplay is a hybrid between a rhythm game and a shoot 'em up. Players control a spacecraft, like many classic shooters, such as Aegis Wing, but the entire game is timed to music, similar to modern rhythm games. Players will be able to play the game either with a standard game controller or a guitar controller.

== Development ==
The game began development in late 2008. The idea for a backwards shooter came while creating a debugging mode for another shooter they were working on to pitch to developers. The debugging mode allows them to reverse time to repeat and test sections of gameplay. The game originally targeted a 2010 release date, but was eventually released on 21 August 2012. On 23 March 2013, Retro/Grade was released for the Windows PC via Steam. The game cost $140,000 to make and it hasn't recouped its cost.

== See also ==
- Neverending Nightmares, the next game by Gilgenbach and McGlothlin
