= Monolisk =

2019 mobile video game

- Developer: Trickster Arts
- Publisher: Trickster Arts
- Designer: Matouš Ježek
- Engine: Unity
- Platforms: Android iOS
- Release: 15 October 2019
- Genre: Action role-playing game
- Modes: Single-player, multiplayer

Monolisk is a 2019 independent action role-playing game developed by Trickster Arts for Android and iOS. It was released on 15 October 2019.

== Gameplay ==
The game combines action role-playing game with collectible card game and "Mario Maker." The game allows player to create their own dungeons and publish them online for other players. Player usually controls his own hero and searches through dungeon created by other players. He comes across various enemies and can use multiple abilities to use against enemies. Abilities are dependent on which character player chooses. Characters have different abilities and skills. Knights use raw power for example.

== Development ==
The game was announced on 28 May 2019.

== Reception ==
Reception

Review score
| Publication | Score |
|---|---|
| TouchArcade | 3.5/5 |
