= Ravensword: Shadowlands =

2013 video game

- Developer: Crescent Moon Games
- Series: Ravensword
- Engine: Unity
- Platforms: iOS, Android, Windows, macOS, Linux, Ouya, PlayStation 4, Xbox One,
- Release: Android: March 21, 2013; Windows, macOS, Linux: December 6, 2013; Ouya: June, 2014; PlayStation 4, Xbox One: April 9, 2021
- Genre: Role-playing game

Ravensword: Shadowlands is a 2013 role-playing game created by American indie studio Crescent Moon Games. It is the successor of Ravensword: The Fallen King. It was released originally only for iOS and Android compatible devices, but later was also released to Windows, due to it being greenlit on Steam.

== Gameplay ==
The game has received many comparison to open world role-playing games in the Elder Scrolls series of games, such as The Elder Scrolls V: Skyrim.

Combat has three main types, with exceptions. Two, melee and ranged, are equipment based. There are various melee and ranged combat styles. Each style has separate skills and equipment, that are individually trained. Magic also has different spells, but all are trained similarly using similar equipment and the same skills.

== Speedrunning ==
In 2022 the game received some notoriety when it was featured in the charity speedrunning live stream ESA 2022. The 4th fastest speedrunner is TharBeFungus with a time of 41 minutes and 21 seconds.

== Reception ==
Reception

Aggregate score
Aggregator	Score
Metacritic	iOS: 76/100

Review score
Publication	Score
TouchArcade	iOS: 5/5

Ravensword: Shadowlands has been generally well received by critics. It has received a 76 out of 100 rating on review aggregator Metacritic based on 12 reviews. TouchArcade strongly praised the game, giving it a perfect 5 out of 5 score and stating that "its hard to believe I'm playing a game of this caliber on iOS...Other than a few minor glitches, Ravensword: Shadowlands is the real deal, and is an excellent open-world RPG with a decent story, ample content, deep character customization and beautiful visuals". Slide to Play awarded the game a 3 out of 4 rating, stating that the game was "...a beautiful game that stumbles often, but only because it reaches so high" and concluded that it was ultimately "not as polished as a game like Skyrim, but there's plenty here for an action RPG fan to love." Gamezebo also compared it favorably to The Elder Scrolls V: Skyrim, and The Elder Scrolls: Oblivion, stating "If you're going to borrow, you may as well borrow from the best...The open world aspect of Ravensword: Shadowlands is one of its big selling points, and it is fun to explore some non-linear adventures on your iOS device. It does have some limitations though, as there are physical barriers out in the world that prevent you from reaching certain parts of the map as freely as you might think." Pocket Gamer described it as "...as big and open an RPG as you're likely to get on iOS" but cited uneven combat as a major weakness of the game, describing it as both "frustratingly punishing and ridiculously easy" at certain points.

AppSpy was more negative towards the game, stating that the difficulty and glitches overshadowed the game's technical feats.
