= Trickster Arts =

Indie video game creator team based on Czech Republic

- Company type: Private
- Industry: Video games
- Founded: 2012; 14 years ago
- Founder: Matouš Ježek
- Headquarters: Prague, Czech Republic
- Key people: Matouš Ježek
- Products: Hero of Many; Hackers
- Number of employees: 2
- Website: tricksterarts.com

Trickster Arts is an indie game development team based in the Czech Republic. It consists of former 2K Czech employees.

== History ==
The studio was founded in Fall 2012 when Matouš Ježek left 2K Czech and started to work on his own game. The project was titled Hero. Ježek also contacted some of his friends and former colleagues to join his team. It included Ladislav Týč and Matúš Široký. They also released an iOS game Date Me If You Can. Its Czech version Interande was, unlike the English version, a success.

The project Hero (renamed to Hero of Many) was in development for 10 months and was released in June 2013 to very positive response from critics. The game was also a minor financial success that allowed Trickster Arts to start works on another project. This new project was an unnamed action adventure in which the player controlled Fire. This was a much bigger project than Hero of Many but the development was eventually stopped after a year, as the game was too difficult for development and too expensive. Trickster Arts then decided to make a game about Hacking.

In November 2012, Matouš Ježek, the CEO was present at Game Developers Session, where he talked about the team and its experiences with the development.

Trickster Arts announced its new game Hackers in April 2016 at Game Access Conference in Brno. Hackers was released on 19 September 2016. The game was downloaded by more than 1 million players after one Month.

Studio announced its next game Action RPG Monolisk on 31 May 2019. The game was released on 15 October 2019.

== Released titles ==
Year	Title	Platform(s)						Notes
Year	Title	iOS	Android	Win	OS X	Ouya	GameStick	Notes
2012	Date Me If You Can	Yes	No	Yes	No	No	No	A simulation of dating. According to developers it is more an interactive film than a game. It was released in the Czech Republic as Interande. The game was played by over 700,000 people. The Windows version was released as a Browser title
2013	Hero of Many	Yes	Yes	Yes	Yes	Yes	Yes	An Action-adventure game. The visual style is reminiscent of games such as Badland and Naught.
2016	Hackers	Yes	Yes	No	No	No	No	Online strategy game. Player controls a hacker who builds his network and hacks other players. It also features story mode.
2019	Monolisk	Yes	Yes	Yes	No	No	No	Action Role-playing game.
TBA	Dreadhunter	No	No	Yes	No	No	No	Shooter game with RPG aspects.
