= 100 Rogues =

2010 video game

- Developers: Dinofarm Games, Fusion Reactions
- Publisher: Fusion Reactions
- Platforms: iOS, Ouya
- Release: iOS; May 4, 2010; Ouya; August 14, 2013
- Genre: Role-playing
- Mode: Single-player

100 Rogues is a role-playing video game developed and published by Dinofarm Games and Fusion Reactions for iOS in 2010, and for Ouya in 2013.

Versions were released for Steam and itch.io on October, 9th 2026.

== Reception ==
Reception

Aggregate score
Aggregator	Score
Metacritic	80/100

Review scores
Publication	Score
The A.V. Club	A−
GamePro	5/5
Gamezebo	4.5/5
Pocket Gamer	4/5
RPGFan	85%
TouchArcade	4/5
Wired	8/10

The iOS version received "favorable" reviews according to the review aggregation website Metacritic.
