= Matcho =

- Developer: FiolaSoft Studio
- Publisher: FiolaSoft Studio
- Producer: Filip Kraucher
- Composers: Vojta Šiman and Jan Ševčík
- Engine: Unreal Engine 5
- Platforms: Windows; Linux; OS X; PlayStation 5; Xbox Series X/S
- Release: 7 March 2027
- Genres: First-person shooter, action-adventure, puzzle
- Modes: Single-player, multiplayer

Matcho is an upcoming video game by FiolaSoft Studio. Set in the same universe as FiolaSoft's previous game Blackhole, Matcho mixes elements of first-person shooter and match-3 puzzle games. It is planned to be released for Microsoft Windows, Linux, and PlayStation 5.

== Gameplay ==
Matcho is described as a Match-3 first-person shooter action-adventure game. Players fight enemies by linking three of the same colour together. Besides story mode, there is an infinite mode with its own short campaign that features a variety of quests not linked to the main story. Endless mode is also linked to a number of challenges, online rankings, and Zen mode where player can freely shoot bugs.

The game will also offer a Multiplayer with Deathmatch Mode.

== Plot ==
The game is set 40 years prior to the events of Blackhole when Earth is invaded by aliens. Max suffers from a mysterious disease which also gives him superpowers to fight aliens. Max and his friends try to solve a mysterious alien invasion that could cure Max's illness and save the Earth.

== Development ==
Matcho was in development by Fiolasoft since 2019. First phase of development concluded in 2020 when the game switched to Unreal Engine 4. The game was announced on 30 March 2022 during Game Access.

Release was scheduled for 13 March 2025 before it was delayed to 17 April 2025. Developers eventually decided to postpone release once agin but without new release date set. They stated that the decision was made after a thorough evaluation of the current state of the project and conclusion that the game needs more time. In August 2025 developers invited fans to participate in playtest noting that Matcho is close to completion, but it needs some fine-tuning.

On 16 November 2026, the game was presented as part of Czech & Slovak Direct Showcase. Fiolasoft announced thethe game releases for Windows and PlayStation 5 on 3 March 2027. Release for Xbox Series X and Series S and other consoles would come later.
