= Nightmare (disambiguation) =

A nightmare is a frightening dream.

Nightmare(s) or The Nightmare may also refer to:

== Art and literature ==
- Mare (folklore) or nightmare, a demon of Germanic folklore
- Night Mare, a 1983 novel by Piers Anthony
- The Nightmare, a painting by Henry Fuseli
- Nightmare (Marvel Comics), a fictional supernatural being
- Nightmare (Topčić novel), a 1997 Bosnian novel by Zlatko Topčić
- Nightmare (Brock novel), 1932, by Lynn Brock
- Nightmare, a painting by Nicolai Abildgaard
- Nightmare, a horror comic from Skywald Publications
- Nightmare, a 1970 novel by Russell H. Greenan
- Nightmares!, a young adult book series co-authored by Jason Segel and Kirsten Miller
- Nightmare, a horror fiction magazine edited by John Joseph Adams
- The Nightmare, a 1954 collection of short stories by C. S. Forester about World War II

== Computing and gaming ==
- Nightmare (Atmosfear series), a board game
- Nightmare (Devil May Cry), a demon in the video game series Devil May Cry
- Nightmare (Dungeons & Dragons), a creature in the role-playing game Dungeons & Dragons
- Nightmare (Kirby), a villain in the video game Kirby's Adventure
  - Parallel Nightmare, an alternate version of Nightmare who is the primary antagonist of Super Kirby Clash
- NightMare (scareware), an early scareware program
- Nightmare (Soulcalibur), a villain in the fighting game series Soulcalibur
- Nightmare, a boss in the video game The Legend of Zelda: Link's Awakening
- Nightmare, a boss in the video games Metroid Fusion and Metroid: Other M
- Nightmare, one of the antagonists of the survival horror game Five Nights at Freddy's 4
- Knight Mare, the name of a Dark-element Skylander from Skylanders: Trap Team

== Film ==
- A Nightmare, 1896 French short silent film directed by Georges Méliès
- Nightmare (1942 film), mystery starring Diana Barrymore
- Nightmare (1956 film), psychological thriller starring Edward G. Robinson
- Nightmare (1964 film), suspense film from Hammer Films
- Nightmare (1965 film), Swedish thriller directed by Arne Mattsson
- Nightmares (1979 film), Polish film directed by Wojciech Marczewski
- Nightmares (1980 film), Australian horror film
- Nightmare (1981 film), "video nasty" slasher film
- Nightmares (1983 film), horror film starring Emilio Estevez
- Nightmare (2000 film), South Korean horror film
- Nightmare (2005 film), film produced by Morgan Pehme
- Nightmare (2011 film), Chinese horror film
- Nightmare (2012 film), Finnish horror thriller
- The Nightmare (2015 American film), documentary by Rodney Ascher
- The Nightmare (2015 German film), drama directed by Achim Bornhak
- Nightmare (2022 film), a Norwegian horror film directed by Kjersti Helen Rasmussen

== Music ==
=== Albums ===
- Nightmare (Avenged Sevenfold album) or the title song (see below), 2010
- Nightmare (Nightmare album), by the Japanese band, 2011
- Nightmare (single album), by Dreamcatcher, 2018
- Nightmares (Architects album), 2006
- Nightmares...and Other Tales from the Vinyl Jungle, by the J. Geils Band, or the title song, 1974
- Nightmares, by From Ashes Rise, 2003
- Nightmares, by Terrorizer, 1987

=== EPs ===
- Nightmare: The Acoustic M.S.G., by McAuley Schenker Group, 1992
- ...Nightmare, by Negazione, 1987
- Nghtmre (EP), by Nghtmre, 2016
- Nightmarer, by Queens Club, 2009
- Nightmares (EP), by Omen, or the title song, 1987

=== Songs ===
- "Nightmare" (Avenged Sevenfold song), 2010
- "Nightmare" (Halsey song), 2019
- "Nightmare" (Tuesday Knight song), 1988
- "Nightmare" (instrumental), by Brainbug, 1997
- "Nightmares" (Bresh song), 2023
- "Nightmares" (Chris Brown song), 2023
- "Nightmare", by Alma from Have U Seen Her?, 2020
- "Nightmare", by The Amity Affliction from This Could Be Heartbreak, 2016
- "Nightmare", by Artie Shaw, 1938
- "Nightmare", by Black Sabbath from The Eternal Idol, 1987
- "Nightmare", by Brendan Small from Brendon Small's Galaktikon II: Become the Storm, 2017
- "Nightmare", by Crooked X from Crooked X, 2009
- "Nightmare", by Gillan from Double Trouble, 1981
- "Nightmare", by Gothminister from Utopia, 2013
- "Nightmare", by Helloween from My God-Given Right, 2015
- "Nightmare", by Iron Fire from Metalmorphosized, 2010
- "Nightmare", by Mercyful Fate from Don't Break the Oath, 1984
- "Nightmare", by Metalite from Heroes in Time, 2017
- "Nightmare", by Nothing,Nowhere from Trauma Factory, 2021
- "Nightmare", by Offset and Metro Boomin from Without Warning, 2017
- "Nightmare", by Polaris from Fatalism, 2023
- "Nightmare", by Prism from Beat Street, 1983
- "Nightmare", by Pvris from Hallucinations
- "Nightmare", by Red Velvet from Chill Kill, 2023
- "Nightmare", by Tyler, the Creator from Goblin, 2011
- "Nightmare", by Venom from Possessed, 2002 reissue
- "Nightmare (Please Wake Me Up)", by John Entwistle from Whistle Rymes, 1972
- "Nightmares", by All Time Low from Last Young Renegade, 2017
- "Nightmares", by Chameleon Circuit from Still Got Legs, 2011
- "Nightmares", by Chelsea Grin from Ashes to Ashes, 2014
- "Nightmares", by Chvrches from Screen Violence, 2021
- "Nightmares", by Clipse from Hell Hath No Fury, 2006
- "Nightmares", by Ed Sheeran from No. 5 Collaborations Project, 2011
- "Nightmares", by Enforcer from Diamonds, 2010
- "Nightmares", by A Flock of Seagulls from Listen, 1983
- "Nightmares", by For the Fallen Dreams from Relentless, 2009
- "Nightmares", by Mac DeMarco from Guitar, 2025
- "Nightmares", by NewDad from Madra, 2024
- "The Nightmare Song", a name for the Lord Chancellor's song "Love unrequited robs me of me rest" from Gilbert and Sullivan's Iolanthe, 1882

=== Performers and labels ===
- Nightmare (French band), a power metal band
- Nightmare (Japanese band), a visual kei rock band
- Nghtmre (born 1990), American DJ and trap producer
- Nightmare Records, an American label founded by Lance King

== Television ==
- "Nightmares" (Buffy the Vampire Slayer), an episode of Buffy the Vampire Slayer
- "The Nightmare" (Dynasty), an episode of Dynasty
- "Nightmare" (1963 The Outer Limits), an episode of the original The Outer Limits series
- "Nightmare" (1998 The Outer Limits), an episode of the revived The Outer Limits series
- "Nightmare" (Supernatural), an episode of the television series Supernatural
- "Nightmare", an episode of The Avengers
- "Nightmare", an episode of Land of the Giants
- Nightmare, a fictional monster in the Brazilian telenovela Caminhos do Coração
- Nightmare, a robot that competed in the series BattleBots
- "Nightmares", an episode of the television series, Off the Air
- "Nightmares", an episode of the television series MacGyver

== People nicknamed Nightmare ==
- Vanes Martirosyan (born 1986), Armenian-born American boxer
- Diego Sanchez (born 1981), American mixed martial artist
- Nghtmre or Tyler Marenyi (born 1990), an American DJ and electronic dance music producer
- KSI (born 1993), a British YouTuber, boxer, and musician

== See also ==
- Knightmare (disambiguation)
- Night terror, a sleep disorder
- Nightmare disorder, a sleep disorder
- Nightmare flip, a skateboarding trick
