= God of Blades =

2012 video game

- Developer: White Whale Games
- Platforms: Android, iOS, Ouya, macOS, Windows
- Release: September 27, 2012
- Genre: Side-scroller

God of Blades is a side-scrolling video game developed by American studio White Whale Games and released on September 27, 2012.

== Critical reception ==
The game has a Metacritic score of 85% based on 10 critics.

TouchArcade said "The distinctive sights and sounds are worth the effort." AppSpy said "Like a fevered nightmare trip through the covers of 70s prog-rock bands and classic pulp-fiction, God of Blades is a beautifully presented and other-worldly experience, but is likewise just as short-lived as you expend its limited content and variety of combat." Edge magazine wrote "As the studio name suggests, this is a game design team that's in love with books, and so it's amongst books that its first offering reveals its true potential." AppSmile said "Using light RPG elements and simple gestures to vanquish enemies one-by-one, God of Blades is a satisfying adventure." Modojo wrote "It's just a shame that, for all this graphical and aural stimulation, the fighting mechanics are so basic." Pocket Gamer wrote "A relentlessly stylish sensory assault that's so in tune with its underlying mechanics that it works, despite the game's obvious flaws."

On September 27, 2012, The Guardian included the game in its list of the "20 Best iPhone, iPad, Android and Windows Phone games this week", referring to God of Blades as "one of the quirkier games in this week's list – but also one of the best", adding that players can expect "a marvellous soundtrack".

== Removal from Google Play ==
As of September 2018, the game is no longer available for download and installation from Google Play even for users who previously purchased it.
