= Fotonica =

2011 video game

- Developer: Santa Ragione
- Platforms: iOS, Microsoft Windows, Android, OS X, Linux
- Release: Microsoft Windows & OS X: WW: July 17, 2011; Linux: WW: November 28, 2012; iOS: WW: September 11, 2014; Android: WW: March 23, 2015
- Genre: Endless runner
- Mode: Single-player

Fotonica (stylized in advertising as FOTONICA) is a cross platform, endless runner video game developed by Italian indie studio Santa Ragione and released on July 17, 2011.

== Reception ==
The game has a Metacritic rating of 87% based on five critic reviews.

TouchArcade wrote: "Really, it's hard to find anything to complain about with Fotonica. It's such a cool experience, is masterfully crafted, and really rewards playing it again and again. Definitely check this one out." Modojo said: "Fotonica is definitely one game that needs to be installed on your favorite device." Pocket Gamer UK wrote: "Frequently savage, but ceaselessly beautiful, FOTONICA is ultimately yet another auto-runner, but only a nutter would ignore 'Canabalt meets Rez'." Multiplayer.it said: "Fotonica is a stylish, ultra-minimalist action game which feels like a blend of Mirror's Edge and Rez, therefore only hardcore gamers might enjoy its peculiar taste." 148Apps wrote: "With a style like few other games out there, FOTONICA is a tricky but compelling first-person endless runner."
