= Black Hole (video game) =

- Developer: DufGames
- Publisher: DufGames
- Designer: Jonathan Deutsch
- Programmer: Jonathan Deutsch
- Artists: Björn Franke; Jonathan Deutsch
- Composer: Björn Franke
- Engine: Unity
- Platforms: Ouya, Switch
- Release: 2016: Ouya; 2018: Switch
- Genre: Twin-stick shooter
- Mode: Single-player

Black Hole is a twin-stick shooter by DufGames. It was released in 2016 on Ouya and ForgeTV. A version for the Nintendo Switch was released on February 6, 2018.

== Gameplay ==
The player must dodge and destroy enemies while collecting pickups they drop.

Black Hole is a twin-stick shooter in space where the player flies through different black holes in a top-down view and fights numerous enemies located inside the black hole. Choosing one of the ships the player starts off with very little weapon power. Through pickups that the enemies drop the ship can be upgraded between each completed level to enhance the primary weapon, unlock a secondary weapon and other various ship upgrades. At the end of each black hole after several levels there is a boss fight.

The game consists of 40 levels across 4 themed black holes or worlds. There are 4 different worlds, mechanical, fire, ice, and beast. The player may choose one of three possible spaceships which can be upgraded in between each level. The game contains 3 difficulty levels and features time and score leaderboards for each of them. Multiple achievements can be unlocked which don't have any influence on the game. In the Nintendo Switch version, a colorblind mode and speedrun mode was added, which changed the differently colored pickups into more readable letters.

The game also integrates HD Rumble, a fully playable touchscreen mode, and also the possibility to play with motion controls or the IR camera, both of which are not meant as the main way of input but more of a fun way to play the game.

== Reception ==
Nintendo Life called it "a solid little shooter". Nintendo World Report liked the difficulty balance and noted the gameplay as unique but criticized the lack of co-op multiplayer.
