= Hero of Many =

2013 video game

- Developer: Trickster Arts
- Publisher: Trickster Arts
- Designer: Matouš Ježek
- Programmer: Ladislav Týč
- Writer: Matouš Ježek
- Composer: Matúš Široký
- Engine: Unity
- Platforms: Android iOS; Ouya; GameStick; Microsoft Windows; OS X
- Release: 24 June 2013 (iOS/Android); 7 October 2013 (Ouya); 30 January 2014 (GameStick); 15 September 2014 (Windows/OS X)
- Genre: Action-adventure game
- Mode: Single-player

Hero of Many is a 2013 independent video game developed by Trickster Arts. It is an Action-adventure game for Android, iOS, Ouya and Windows. The Windows version was released on Steam on 15 September 2014. The game contains no dialogue and uses black silhouette graphics similar to Limbo. Hero of Many was inspired by the games Another World, Heart of Darkness and Abe's Oddysee.

== Gameplay ==
A screenshot from the game. The player controls the ball as he is accompanied by white fish. Black fish are enemies. You can see the black silhouette graphics resembling Limbo.

The player takes the role of a white-colored ball-shaped creature. The creature goes to an underwater cave in which he encounters fish. The white fish are friends to the player, and accompany him. The black ones are enemies which attack him and his companions. The player can send white fish that follow him against the black ones. The glow of the player's character serves as the health indicator. It can be replenished by lights that can be found scattered across the level. Crystals serve as checkpoints.

The game contains 26 levels. The goal of the game is to reach the end of the level. There are four worlds – Grey, Red, Green and Blue. There are also multiple puzzles, mini games and boss fights. There are also multiple traps that player should avoid.

== Story ==
The game contains no spoken dialogue, but there are numerous cutscenes displaying events from the game's world. The game takes place during a period of genocide on the white fish committed by the black ones. The hero narrowly escapes death when his escort is attacked by black fish. He starts to organize a defense and eventually kills a captain of the black fish, but it turns out that he was just a minion and the black fish are truly led by the Black. Hero continues to fight enemies and gets to the Kingdom of Red where he meets the Red Queen. They continue together but they soon come across Black, who easily defeats Hero, who is unconscious, falling to the depth. The Red Queen tries to help him, but Hero is eaten by a Whale.

Hero gets out of Whale's stomach and gets to the Green World. There he meets Green. They start to seek green seeds that can revive the Tree of Life which is the center of Green World but is currently rotten. During the search Hero is attacked by the Earth Dragon and almost dies but is saved by Red Queen who shows up at the last moment. They together revive the Tree of Life but Black shows up and attacks it along with his army. Hero fights them off but Green dies. Energy from his body enters the Tree where it grows into a fruit. Via this fruit Hero gets Green's power. Hero starts his chase for Black. It leads him to the Blue World.

In the Blue World he liberates a temple from the black fish and meets Blue who puts him to the test. Hero has to get through a labyrinth and fight a labyrinth monster. He passes and Blue explains the start of the war. The black fish were once white but they came across a black mass. It turned them black and made them aggressive. It also turned Grey to Black. He then initiated the campaign to exterminate the white fish.

Hero returns to the Kingdom of Red where he meets the Red Queen. They are attacked by Black and forced to overcome a "race" with him. In the end they escape. Together they get to the center of the kingdom where the Red Queen gains new power so they launch an attack which pushes the black fish from a local nest. There they help little fiss to be born. Soon after that Black attacks and conquers it back. Hero has to escape but is able to gather enough forces to attack enemy positions in Grey World. It turns bad when he comes into contact with the black mass while saving the life of the Red Queen for whom he sacrifices himself. He finds himself in a black-and-white world where he meets Green and is "reborn".

Hero becomes stronger than ever and starts to gather a strong swarm for the final battle. Just before the attack he meets the Red Queen for the last time. The strike is successful, as he destroys the black armies and Black is chased to the lighthouse. There is a duel between Hero and Black. In the end Black is defeated and absorbed. Hero, now exhausted from the darkness he absorbed, leaves the lighthouse and lies on the ground. The player can see a text of words by Lao Tzu: "Bearing yet not possessing. Acting yet not expecting. Leading yet not dominating. This is the Primal Virtue." Hero then dissolves the darkness he absorbed and dies. Multiple lights of energy are coming from his body and the Red Queen takes them. She puts these lights across the world while the credits roll.

== Development ==
The game was in development since summer 2012 when Matouš Ježek left 2K Czech. At first he contacted some of his friends and former colleagues. With them he started to develop the project "Hero" which turned into Hero of Many. The game was developed in Unity Engine. The development took 10 months. Trickster Arts was focusing on the PC version after the release of the IOS and Android version.

On 7 October the Ouya version was released. The game was also released for GameStick on 30 January 2014. Versions for other platforms were planned in 2014. Developers also started, in parallel, to work on another project.

When the game was greenlit, developers started to work on a port for Windows. The main focus was to adjust the controls so the game experience was as good as for touchscreen platforms. The game was released on Steam on 15 September.

=== Steam Greenlight ===
On 10 September 2013 the game was applied to the Steam Greenlight system. It was scheduled for release in fourth quarter of 2013. On 8 January 2014 it was announced that the game had already received over 6600 votes and was 85% of the way to the TOP 100. On 4 April, the game was number 59 on Steam Greenlight as Trickster Arts announced on Twitter. The game was greenlit on 29 April 2014.

== Soundtrack ==
The soundtrack was composed by Slovak composer Matúš Široký. The in-game soundtrack contains 51 tracks with approximately one hour of music. The soundtrack received much praise, and fans of the game asked Trickster Arts to provide it for download. The soundtrack was released on Loudr in July 2013. The album also included bonus tracks that were cut from the final game. These include another 15 minutes of music.

== Reception ==
Reception

Aggregate score
Aggregator	Score
Metacritic	iOS: 88/100

Review scores
Publication	Score
Pocket Gamer	80%
TouchArcade	4.5/5
Slide to Play	100%
Arcade Sushi	85%
Bonusweb	85%
148Apps	80%
GameWoof	100%
AndroidShock	70%

=== Mobile version ===
Hero of Many received positive critical acclaim upon its release. Its review score is aggregated at 88/100 on Metacritic. It was praised for its atmosphere, gameplay, soundtrack and graphics.

The least positive review came from HardcoreDroid. The game scored 70% there. The game was criticised for its severe slowdown but the review was positive overall. Server Slide to Play on the other hand released one of the most positive reviews for the game. It criticised the controls and lack of classical game elements but praised its minimalism, gameplay and atmosphere. In this review, the game scored 100%.

=== PC version ===
The PC version was also met with positive feedback from critics. The review published by Games.cz praised how developers ported the game to PC. Also praised "nonviolent nature of the game, relaxing pace with which the game tells a heartbreaking story through simple video."

Another review was published by Italian SpazioGames. This review praised storytelling, soundtrack and expolorativeness. On the other hand, it criticised the game for being too easy and lacking gameplay.

212Fahrenheit review praised the game for its gameplay, atmosphere and impressive soundtrack. Another point of praise is a story that is open to interpretation. The review also noted that the gameplay is pretty limited.

What's your Tag? review found gameplay a bit repetitive at times but noted that new concepts in game are introduced in good intervals which helps. The Combat, specifically when in tiny places, was criticised on the other Hand. Graphics, Soundtrack and Atmosphere gained much praise and the game was likened to Limbo. The review was overally very positive and gave the game 80%.

== Awards ==
- 5th best Android game of the year by Trusted Reviews
- 3rd best paid Android Game of the year and 4th best Adventure game for Android of the year by GameWoof
- One of 10 best Android Games by servers PocketGamer and Setuix
- 4th best adventure game for Ouya in 2013 by server Day of Ouya
- 2nd best Ambient Android game by Android Headlines
- One of the best mobile games of the year by server Games.cz
- Fourth best mobile game by readers of Games.cz
- Pocket Gamer Awards 2014 nominee in the category Most Innovative Game
- Czech Video Game of the Year 2013 Award nomination for artistic contribution to Czech video game output
- 3rd Best Czech Game of the year in BOOOM 2013
- 3rd Best Story in Android Game by Insider Monkey
