= Neverending Nightmares =

2014 video game

- Developer: Infinitap Games
- Publisher: Infinitap Games
- Designer: Matt Gilgenbach
- Composer: Skyler McGlothlin
- Platforms: Android; Windows; OS X; Linux; PlayStation 4; PlayStation Vita; iOS; Nintendo Switch
- Release: September 26, 2014: Android, Linux, OS X, Windows; September 26, 2014; PlayStation 4, PlayStation Vita; May 3, 2016; iOS; November 29, 2017; Nintendo Switch; July 22, 2020
- Genre: Survival horror
- Mode: Single-player

Neverending Nightmares is a video game developed by Infinitap Games. It is a horror game drawing inspiration from the lead designer Matt Gilgenbach's personal struggles with obsessive–compulsive disorder (OCD) and depression; in an interview, he stated that he was "trying to create that feeling [of bleakness and hopelessness] in Neverending Nightmares".

== Gameplay ==
The player takes the role of Thomas, a man who "wakes up" from one nightmare and into another. As the player navigates Thomas throughout the game, the nightmares become progressively worse, including the horrifying monsters that lurk within them. Each time Thomas dies in a nightmare, comes across some serious cause of depression, or commits self-harm, he will "wake up" again in either the same nightmare as before, or into a different one. This acts as the game's checkpoint and save system. The game contains a total of three different endings, all influenced by the player's choices or paths that they take.

The game features a 2D hand-drawn line art style heavily influenced by the works of Edward Gorey. It uses a minimalist user interface, forgoing onscreen prompts and loading screens during play in order to increase immersion.

== Plot ==
=== Setting and characters ===
Neverending Nightmares revolves around Thomas Smith, a young man who is suffering from a seemingly-endless string of nightmares (hence the title). Another character, Gabby, is introduced as Thomas' little sister, and frequently appears in his nightmares, occasionally changing roles. At turning points in the game, Thomas finds Gabby dead in various situations; Thomas himself also dies in his nightmares, sometimes by his own hand, though this only leads him to wake up in yet another nightmare.

Throughout the game, which is implied to be set in the late 1800s, Thomas must explore various locations in his nightmares. These include a mansion, a cemetery, an insane asylum, a forest, and a hospital.

=== Story ===
The game begins with Thomas "waking up" from a nightmare, in which he had stabbed his younger sister Gabby in the stomach. As he wanders through each nightmare, "waking up" in a bed each time, the player sees Thomas commit gruesome acts of self-harm out of depression, such as pulling a blood vessel or even a bone out of his arm.

Depending on the player's actions, Thomas will finally wake up into one of three different endings.

- Wayward Dreamer: after waking up, a young Thomas goes to Gabby's room, where he kisses his sleeping sister good-night.
- Destroyed Dreams: after escaping a nightmarish version of himself, Thomas slowly awakens in a hospital, his arms bandaged and bloody. Gabby, either as his sister or wife, begs him to wake up, and rejoices when he finally does.
- The Final Descent: an adult Thomas wakes up at his desk, where he reads a letter from Gabrielle, his wife. After the loss of their daughter, Gabrielle was forced to leave Thomas, as he couldn't get over the tragedy. After reading the letter, Thomas quietly weeps in his chair. A portrait on the wall implies that the girl murdered at the beginning was his daughter, not Gabrielle.

== Development ==
In September 2013, a Kickstarter campaign for the game's development was successfully funded, raising $106,722 of its original $99,000 goal. The game was released for Linux, OS X, and Windows via Steam and as well as Android via Ouya on September 26, 2014. Ports for both the PlayStation 4 and PlayStation Vita were released on May 3, 2016. Mobile versions for iOS and Android were released on November 29, 2017. The game was made available for Nintendo Switch on July 22, 2020.

== Reception ==
=== Pre-release ===
Neverending Nightmares received largely positive buzz during the course of its development. Adam Sessler said it was "very, very interesting" after playing an early build at the Penny Arcade Expo. He compared it to Gone Home in how it told a story personally relevant to its creator. IGN included it on a list of its most anticipated horror games for 2014, emphasizing its "wonderfully-distinct, pen-and-ink style." It was nominated by The Escapist as one of the best games of E3 2014.

Reception

Aggregate score
Aggregator	Score
Metacritic	68/100

Review scores
Publication	Score
Destructoid	70/100
Eurogamer	70/100
Game Informer	78/100
GameRevolution	90/100
GameSpot	7/10
GameStar	62/100
Joystiq	70/100
RPGFan	85/100
USgamer	90/100

=== Post-release ===
The game received a score of 68/100 at Metacritic indicating "mixed or average reviews". Smangaliso Simelane praised the game's "spooky soundtrack composed of twinkling piano notes and ominous synthetic whines." Giant Bomb nominated it for Best-Looking Game and Best Horror Game of 2014. In a positive review, GameRevolution praised the story and atmosphere, recommending, "Whether or not you find it scary, you’ll definitely be disturbed and intrigued."

In a mixed review, Kyle Hilliard of Game Informer praised the artwork, environments, and sound design and felt the game "succeeds in making the player feel an uneasy sadness in a terrifying setting", but "falls short on compelling gameplay". Similarly, Justin Clark of GameSpot commended the game's atmosphere and art style, but criticized the gameplay, endings, and replay value.

=== Sales ===
In April 2015, it was reported that Neverending Nightmares had sold around 22,000 copies across all platforms, and that it had generated around $250,000 in revenue.

== See also ==
- Retro/Grade, the previous game by Gilgenbach and McGlothlin
- Edward Gorey (influenced art style of the game)
- The Gashlycrumb Tinies
