= Knightmare Tower =

2013 role-playing video game

- Developer: Juicy Beast Studio
- Platforms: iOS, Windows, OS X, Linux, Android, browser, OUYA
- Release: iOS; August 1, 2013; Windows, OS X, Linux; June 16, 2014; OUYA; July 2014
- Genre: RPG

Knightmare Tower is a game by Canadian indie developer Juicy Beast Studio, which was released on iOS on August 1, 2013 and on Windows, OS X, and Linux on June 16, 2014.

== Production ==
The game is a port of a flash game of the same game.

== Critical reception ==
The iOS version of the game has a Metacritic rating of 84 based on 10 critics reviews.

AppSmile said "A port of the popular Flash game, Knightmare Tower mixes twitch gameplay with light RPG elements and an engaging art style to create on-the-go fun. " TouchArcade said " Knightmare Tower doesn't so much drastically wring minutes out of you as much as it quietly and neatly absorbs them. " 14*Apps said "Knightmare Tower features a unique combat-based endless vertical gameplay, all without in-app purchases. " Gamezebo said "Games like Jetpack Joyride succeed in hooking players because they'll always want to do a little better than they did last time. Knightmare Tower slam dunks this idea by giving players items that will iteratively improve their performance time and time again. " AppSpy said " Knightmare Tower has charm, action, and satisfying progression. The controls take some getting used to, but this is still one of the better 'pick up and play' games we've seen for a while. " ArcadeSushi said " Knightmare Tower is a gem that reaches for the stars. It doesn't quite achieve perfection, but who cares when you're surrounded by royalty. " Apple'N'Apps said "Knightmare Tower is a fast-paced fun that somehow gets even more enjoyable as you play to keep you battling up that tower making it a should buy that is a dream to play." Pocket Gamer said "Knightmare Tower is brash, glitchy, and it doesn't last very long, but it packs a lot of high-intensity fun into the two or three hours it'll take you to finish it. ".

The PC version has a rating of 79% by PC Games, which wrote "Knightmare Tower shows again, that the simplest ideas are often the best. Great accessibility and an excellently balanced upgrade system make this an ideal candidate for a quick dose of fun prior to going to bed. There may not be much to Knightmare Tower, but what's on offer here, is polished to a brilliant shine."
