= Julie Uhrman =

American businesswoman

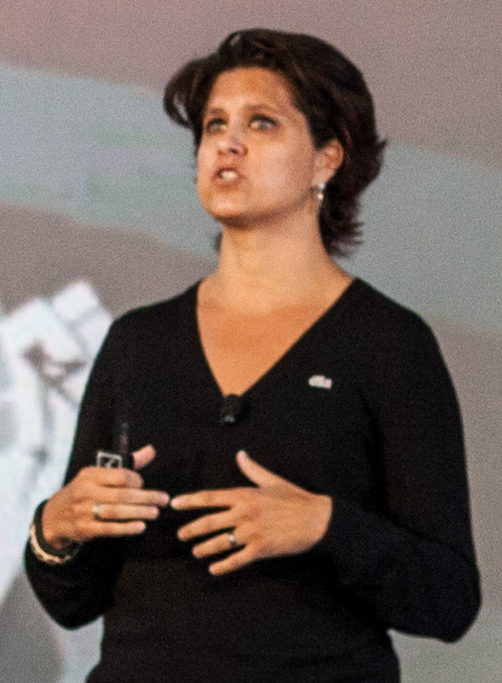
- Uhrman in 2013
- Born: Los Angeles, California
- Citizenship: United States
- Education: Washington University in St. Louis (BSBA 1996)
- Occupation: Entrepreneur
- Title: Founder and CEO of Ouya; Co-founder and president of Angel City FC

Julie Uhrman is an American businesswoman who is president and co-founder of Angel City FC, a National Women's Soccer League team based in Los Angeles, California. She was previously an executive at Playboy Enterprises, Lionsgate Entertainment, IGN, and Vivendi Entertainment, and founded the now-defunct video game console company Ouya.

== Life and career ==
Uhrman and her twin sister Amy Longhi were born and raised in Los Angeles, California. She has two children, Charlie and Elle.

=== Ouya ===
In 2012 Uhrman founded video gaming console maker Ouya, Inc., and was its CEO until 2015. The platform was heralded to revolutionize the game industry with its microconsole. It had a successful Kickstarter campaign, having received $8,596,474 and garnered much hope and goodwill from the gaming community to try and get more games on the television. Despite a loyal and hopeful fanbase, many critics became skeptical of Ouya's ability to deliver on its goals of getting more players to play games on the television, with each of Uhrman's subsequent public appearances and interviews to promote the company and get more games on the television. After launch, Ouya became a commercial failure. The console was critically panned and derided for its low quality, poor design, and lack of proper gaming content. After the controversy, Ouya failed to re-negotiate its debt with investors and its content library was sold to Razer Inc., where the console's hardware was soon discontinued.

=== Angel City FC ===
In 2020 Uhrman co-founded Angel City FC with venture capitalist Kara Nortman of Upfront Ventures, and actress Natalie Portman. The National Women's Soccer League (NWSL) club signed 21 sponsors and sold 14,300 season tickets before its first season of play, and attracted a $14 million investment round from numerous celebrities, including lead investor Alexis Ohanian. Nortman recruited Uhrman in 2019 from the pickup basketball league both women competed in and tasked her with building the team's business plan, despite Uhrman not previously knowing that the NWSL existed. The NWSL granted Uhrman's group an expansion team on July 21, 2020, for play in the 2022 NWSL season.
