= Mini Motor Racing =

- Developer: The Binary Mill
- Platforms: iOS; Android; Microsoft Windows; PlayStation 4 PlayStation VR; Oculus Rift; Oculus Quest
- Release: iPad, iPhone, iPod Touch; December 8, 2011; Android; May 11, 2012; Microsoft Windows; May 1, 2013; PlayStation 4 December 17, 2019
- Genre: Racing
- Modes: Single-player, multiplayer

Mini Motor Racing is an isometric racing game developed by The Binary Mill for iOS and Android platforms. In May 2013, the game was released for the Microsoft Windows platform as Mini Motor Racing EVO and in December 2019 for PlayStation 4 and PlayStation VR as Mini Motor Racing X. It was released on the iTunes App Store on December 8, 2011, and on the Google Play Network on May 11. The game features vehicle, race and environment physics, vehicle upgrades, day and night tracks, Career, Quick Race and Multiplayer modes along with Game Center leaderboards and achievements. Mini Motor Racing also uses Apple's iCloud to store and sync progress across iOS 5 devices.

== Gameplay ==
Mini Motor Racing is an arcade-style racer with strong emphasis on fun over realism. Rather than controlling acceleration and braking, the user must instead master powerslides and timely nitrous boosts to succeed. Cars regularly crash into the environment and each other, but there is no vehicle damage. The game uses a modified version of the Unity physics engine to model these collisions.

Finishing In Any Position in race nets the player cash rewards, which can be supplemented through in-game cash power ups. This cash is used to purchase cars, or upgrade purchased/unlocked cars when playing career mode.

The game uses HD graphics, and while the game is set in an isometric view, the cars and tracks are full 3D models. Several control schemes are available for the user's selection, though physical controls such as those on the Sony Xperia Play are not supported.

Mini Motor Racing uses Apple's Game Center platform for social play, featuring competitive per-track leaderboards and achievements. Multiplayer gameplay is supported through WiFi and Bluetooth, allowing for up to 4 players in WiFi and 2 players through Bluetooth connectivity.

== Mini Motor 1.5 Update ==
A large update for Mini Motor Racing was released in early May 2012. The update added new content, including cars and tracks, but the most notable addition was the inclusion of online multiplayer for iDevices. Previously, the game supported only local area multiplayer.

== Reception ==
Mini Motor Racing has been well received by critics, with high praise for its graphics, gameplay, and depth though there has been criticism over sometimes buggy terrain and collision physics.

== See also ==
- Mini All4 Racing
