= Stash: No Loot Left Behind =

2017 video game

- Logo Artwork
- Developer: FrogDice
- Publisher: FrogDice
- Platform: Microsoft Windows
- Release: September 7, 2017
- Genres: Turn-based, RPG
- Modes: Single-player, multiplayer

Stash: No Loot Left Behind is a role-playing video game, initially released on Kickstarter. It was officially funded on September 16, 2014, and released for Microsoft Windows in 2017. Stash was initially met with mixed reviews and has since been abandoned by its developer FrogDice.

== Gameplay ==
Stash is a multiplayer online RPG with turn based combat and a large amount of goods that may be acquired while adventuring, popularly referred to as "loot". A player may create and customize a character with 4 races and 4 classes to choose from. Every player gets their own Base of Operations that starts as a bedroll, but can be upgraded to any of a number of possible buildings, ranging from tents to simple homes to castles. Homes can be decorated and designed on the interior and exterior. A Base of Operations also serves as a "stash" where players send back their treasures and show off trophies. It is also where a player may build usable structures to craft or merely to entertain themselves and their friends.

Stash has a huge, tile based world that a player explores via a "peg" on the map. The world view is like a game board in tabletop or miniature gaming, intended to make world travel easier, faster, and less confusing. As one explores, they will find "Points of Interest" consisting of dungeons, caves, mines, towers, fortresses, camps, etc. One can then interact with a Point of Interest to enter it and explore in greater detail.

Stash features dungeons which are either hand-crafted or procedurally generated, which are also the main way to acquire loot. Treasure can consist of weapons, armor, clothing, jewelry, magical items, legendary items, crafting materials, collectibles, works of art, decorations, pets, and mounts.

Crafting materials can be found raw or created by breaking down items. If one builds the right structures in their base (stove, forge, workbench, etc.), they can return there to craft various items, such as weapons, armor, jewelry, clothing, decorations for a Base of Operations, food, and more. Players may use the crafted stuff for themselves, give/trade it with others, or sell it on the market. Once a player gets started with some basic materials and structures in their base, they could theoretically never leave civilization, focusing all of their play on their base, crafting, and selling on the market.

Clans are a social and political feature of Stash. Players can join together to form a Clan, establish themes of their choosing, and compete with other Clans for dominance. A player's Clan will gain levels, power, abilities, renown, and perhaps infamy through its members' actions and dedication. Every major zone has an outpost that serves as a hub for adventuring in that region. In an outpost, one can find vendors, transportation, and other services. Outposts can be taken over by Clans or individuals and run as they see fit. The ruler of the outpost sets policies, maintains vendors and services, and is responsible for its defense. They can also alter the appearance of the outpost. To thrive, the outpost must attract adventurers. In exchange for all this, the ruler earns rewards, coin, and fame.

Player vs. Player (PvP) is a prominent feature in Stash. Players may challenge other players or groups to a duel, or engage in a matchmade solo or group battle. When a player enters a PvP battle, a "snapshot" is taken of their character. The rest of the PvP battle will continue with that snapshot version of the character, without affecting the original statistics of that character. For instance, after a player enters a duel, they can then choose to continue adventuring with their "real" character and find new loot, level up, etc. without affecting the PvP snapshot.

Stash is a multiplayer online game in a persistent world (MMORPG). Players may group up with friends to adventure through the world, plunder dungeons, defeat bosses, or just be social, or may battle other groups of adventurers in team based PvP. Stash is designed to promote co-op play or competition. A player can also play Stash as an individual character whenever they prefer, which the developers refer to as "playing alone, together" since a player still can interact with other players while playing as a lone character, such as conducting trade, casting beneficial spells upon one another, or engaging in socialization.

== Combat ==
At the beginning of an encounter, each combatant makes an initiative roll modified by initiative effects from stats, gear, buffs, abilities, and other modifiers. Ties are broken by luck stat. Portraits are displayed along the top of the screen showing the current order of initiative. If there is not enough room for all the combatants, < > arrows are added to scroll through combatants. Players have a brief amount of time to confer before the battle begins. The default time for this is 60 seconds but the party leader can end this by clicking [BATTLE] at any time before the timer expires.

A round of combat is defined by the time it takes for every combatant to have their turn. If they are CC’d they may not actually get to do anything on their turn. Players have 30 seconds to make their decision each round. Group leaders may have the ability to change that. Options available to a character when their turn begins are:

- MOVE - Move a number of squares up to the character's maximum movement range.
- ACT - Use an ability, attack something, etc.
- BRACE - Brace oneself for an aggressor. Delays ACT until an enemy mob enters an adjacent square. The bracer's action then happens immediately.
- DELAY - Before moving, acting, or bracing, one can DELAY and push their character to the end of the queue. This is permanent for the encounter. A player may only delay once per round.
- SKIP - Skip a turn.

If a player chooses to MOVE first, they can move up to their maximum movement distance and click STOP when they are done moving. Then the ACT, BRACE, and SKIP options become available. If a player chooses to ACT first, they can still move afterward. If a player chooses to BRACE, that ends your turn (until/unless the BRACE is triggered).

Once a player chooses to ACT, BRACE is no longer available even if MOVE is still available. If a character has a "secondary movement" stat, they also gain another move-like option after using their first MOVE. This is generally linked to a special ability use. If a character has secondary movement, their player has a wider variety of tactical options, such as move-act, move-act-secondary move, act-move-secondary move, etc.

Every character has a "reactions" stat. By default this is 1. Modifications to this will be relatively rare and special. If an enemy moves from a non-adjacent square to a square adjacent to a player's character, and the character has at least 1 "reactions" available, the character immediately interrupts the enemy's movement and can perform one ACT. This is inspired by Dungeons & Dragons' "attack of opportunity" although less complicated. A character's "reactions" stat is reset every round.
