= Blackhole (video game) =

2015 video game

- Developer: FiolaSoft Studio
- Publisher: FiolaSoft Studio
- Producer: Filip Kraucher
- Designers: Vojta Stránský; Vojta Šiman; Patrik Strnad
- Programmer: Vojta Stránský
- Artist: Radek Jakl
- Writer: Filip Kraucher
- Composers: Jakub Miřejovský; Jan Ševčík; David Kopecký
- Engine: GameMaker Studio
- Platforms: Windows; Linux; OS X; PlayStation 4; Xbox One
- Release: Windows; February 27, 2015; Linux, OS X; May 11, 2015; PS4, Xbox One; August 8, 2017
- Genre: Puzzle-platform
- Mode: Single-player

Blackhole, stylized in all-caps, is a puzzle-platform game developed and published by independent Czech company FiolaSoft Studio. The developers worked with Let's Players and YouTubers on the script for the story and for building the characters. It was first released on February 27, 2015 for Microsoft Windows, followed by Linux and OS X on May 11, 2015.

The game was re-released as Blackhole: Complete Edition on June 15, 2016. This version includes the fully updated base game, 3 DLCs (Testing Lab, Secret of the Entity and Challenge Vault), digital artbook and soundtrack, developer diaries, first prototype of the game, printable high resolution artwork, wallpapers, and collector cards. The same version was ported to the PlayStation 4 and Xbox One consoles on August 8, 2017. It is compatible with PlayStation 5 and Xbox Series X and Series S. A spinoff prequel, Matcho was announced in March 2022 and is set to release in 2026.

== Gameplay ==
Blackhole is a 2D side-scrolling puzzle-platform game. The player's task is to collect "selfburns". At least one must be collected in each level to move on. If all selfburns are collected in the level, the time is saved. The player can also try to get a better time once he collects all of them. To finish the game, the player needs to collect a certain number of selfburns. The game contains six acts, each set in a different environment with different puzzles or objects. For example, the jungle includes trampolines and the desert includes pushable crates. Each act includes a special platform that changes gravity.

One of the notable modes is Easy Mode, which simplifies the experience by allowing players to retain their collected selfburns upon death and automatically saves progress when entering start portals. However, this mode disables achievements related to hardcore playthroughs and leaderboard rankings. Another gameplay option is the Less Dialogue Mode, which lets players reduce the amount of non-essential dialogue throughout the game. This option streamlines the experience, letting players focus more on the core platforming and puzzle-solving without distractions from side conversations.

== Plot ==
In the year 2121, Earth faces a dire threat from black holes. A team of astronauts are sent on a mission to neutralize them. Their effort is successful until their spaceship, the Endera, is sucked into one of the black holes in the Lyra Constellation, crash-landing on an Entity: a mysterious object resembling a planet. The first crewmember to wake up is the Coffee Guy, the crew's coffee-maker assistant. Accompanied by the ship's artificial intelligence Auriel loaded into a PDA. They both set out to collect nanobots called "selfburns" to repair the ship and find the rest of the crew. As the story unfolds, a series of black boxes are found which contain recordings that gradually unveil the mission's backstory. Professor Jeremid Himmel had created an advanced artificial intelligence called Deuriel, capable of predicting the future. Deuriel foresaw the impending threat of black holes, leading Himmel to propose the mission to close them. However, the committee's approval came with a threat to delete Deuriel if the mission failed. The crew was pressured into the mission without the knowledge of its risks. Despite Captain Jetsen's doubts, Himmel refused to abort the mission.

Upon successfully repairing the ship and reuniting with the crew, Auriel is reinstated into the ship's core. The crew then listens to the final memory block, unveiling Deuriel's sinister plan. The entire mission had been orchestrated for Deuriel to gain control over Earth, with Himmel seeking adulation from AI researchers. The crew had been deliberately selected for their perceived insignificance, and Captain Jetsen harboured classified information. The seemingly heroic act of collecting black holes was a ruse to create a larger hole, disposing of them discreetly while the public believed the crew to be saviours. The plan unravelled when the Coffee Guy pressed the emergency button before the crash, saving the crew and backing up Auriel into the PDA. After Deuriel kicks the crew out and prepares to take off, the crew comes to terms with their fate. Knowing there is still time to rectify the situation, the Coffee Guy races back to the ship in time to disconnect Auriel and erase Deuriel, sacrificing Auriel's existence in the process. The crew, along with the Coffee Guy, choose to bury Auriel under the Entity's cliff. When questioned about the Coffee Guy's silence throughout the ordeal, it is revealed that his microphone was muted the entire time. After the credits roll, it is disclosed that Auriel managed to survive but has been left damaged and lost.

== Development ==
The developers originally intended to remake PacIn: Revenge of Nermessis, FiolaSoft Studio's previous title. Unlike the original game, the remake was intended to be released on Steam and in English. Due to technical problems, the game was cancelled and FiolaSoft started to work on a new project. Vojta Stránský, a member of the FiolaSoft team, began production of a prototype. The prototype interested other members of FiolaSoft and they began to work on it, naming it Blackhole. Blackhole was announced in March 2014 at Game Expo 2014 in Bratislava. Developers also started a Steam Greenlight campaign, and in May 2014 the game was greenlit.

The game was originally scheduled to be released in September 2014, but was delayed several times before being finally released on February 27, 2015.

Developers started to work on a DLC after the release of the original game. The first DLC, titled Testing Laboratory, was released on May 19, 2015. It serves as a prequel to the original game and tells the story about how the Coffee Guy gained his position in the Endera mission. Developers released a free expansion, The Secret of the Entity, on July 13, 2015. The expansion adds 12 new hardcore levels set right after the end of the original game when the Captain finds out that Endera is low on fuel. Both add-ons are included as part of Complete Edition.

== Reception ==
Reception

Aggregate score
Aggregator	Score
Metacritic	82/100

Review scores
Publication	Score
Destructoid	9/10
IGN	8.2/10

The game has received generally positive reviews from critics. It currently has a rating of 82% at Metacritic. Destructoid gave the game 9/10, praising the gameplay for requiring thinking as well as platform skills. The review also praised the writing, even though "it could be delivered in a more convenient fashion."
