= Noctis (video game) =

2000 video game

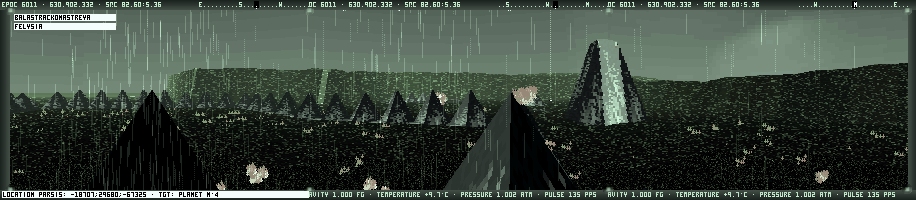
- Panoramic screenshot
- Designer: Alessandro Ghignola
- Series: Noctis
- Platforms: MS-DOS, Windows
- Release: 2000
- Genre: Space exploration/flight simulation
- Mode: Single-player

Noctis (Latin for "of the night") is a space flight simulation video game for Windows released in 2000 for free by Italian programmer Alessandro Ghignola. It centers around first-person visual exploration of the fictional Feltyrion galaxy, which is presented as being approximately 90 thousand light-years in radius—double that of the actual Milky Way Galaxy—and containing over 78 billion stars, many of which host star systems with exoplanets and natural satellites.

== Gameplay ==
The game has players take the role of a silent protagonist pilot operating a Stardrifter, a fictional spacecraft capable of instantaneous interstellar travel. This mode of transportation acts as a primary game mechanic wherein players may approach various star systems both to refuel their vehicle utilizing lithium ions ejected from stars, and to physically land their vehicle on exoplanetary surfaces—barring gas giants, substellar objects, and what the game identifies as unstable worlds—and then explore them. The explorable locales in the game feature a variety of procedurally-generated atmospheres, climates, flora, fauna, and ruins.

Players are not presented with a specified goal or win condition, and are instead encouraged to catalogue and annotate discoveries they make during gameplay. These notes are then stored in a common database of stellar bodies called the GUIDE, which was manually synchronized and made accessible by other players via updates. These GUIDE updates were originally provided manually by Ghignola, who regularly compiled new versions based on emailed submissions of players, and allowed the compilation to be downloaded using an in-game "Inbox" feature. Ghignola ceased making GUIDE updates from 2005 to 2008, before resuming the service. He last updated the GUIDE in October of 2023.

== Development ==
Alessandro Ghignola began creating Noctis in 1996. He was inspired by Mercenary 2: "that title had a huge solar system, I thought, I’ll go bigger and build a whole galaxy". The game's galaxy was planned to be larger than the Milky Way while being a little over 2 MB. "[E]ach segment of code could not go beyond 640k of memory", he explained.

Noctis versions I-IV were written in C and Assembly.

Noctis I through III (which were simply titled Noctis until the release of Noctis IV) are still available and contain features that were abandoned with later releases.

=== Noctis IV, NICE ===
Noctis was originally written for MS-DOS and uses a fixed display resolution of 320 x 200, and an upper limit imposed on the walking distance from a planetary landing site (this restriction does not necessarily limit the player's ability to traverse the planet, as players may freely take off and land elsewhere to continue their exploration). These limitations do not apply to the Feltyrion galaxy itself.

The current version of the game is called Noctis IV. In the release of Noctis IV, Ghignola included a facility to have planet names and notes sent back to him and then compiled into the GUIDE. After that, players could discuss their discoveries with others, and a group of explorers quickly emerged, relying primarily on the Noctis forums for contact. This community often vied for a wide range of notable discoveries, such as the planetary system with the most planets or the biggest tree in the Noctis universe.

The source code for Noctis IV was released to the public in 2003 under the WTOF Public License, which has led to the creation of a fan-made "mod" to the game called Noctis IV CE (commonly abbreviated NICE). NICE includes bug fixes and additional features which increase the playability compared to Noctis IV. The terrain generation code has also been altered in the NICE version - this renders many remarks made in the GUIDE for Noctis IV largely invalid when used in NICE.

=== Linoleum ===
Linoleum was a low-level programming language created for work on Noctis V by Alessandro Ghignola. It was similar to programming languages like Python. It has been discontinued by its creator.

Alessandro shared his thoughts on Linoleum with the retro game site timeextension.com: "[It was] perfectly fine for me, but honestly not that great anyway. In the end, after four versions, I stopped updating it since there were so many better alternatives out there, such as Python. I thought, why bother?"

=== Noctis V (unreleased) ===
A future version of Noctis (tentatively named Noctis V or Noctis NoVa, sometimes abbreviated as NoVa) was under development as of October 11, 2001. Noctis V was not officially cancelled, but according to its creator, the project has been largely abandoned.

Key features of the game intended to relieve the walking distance restrictions of the current Noctis platform (as described above). The new version of Noctis was being developed in Linoleum, a low-level programming language created by Ghignola. Because Noctis and Linoleum were being constructed simultaneously, Noctis V's development was slowed significantly.

Screenshots and details have been revealed by the developer indicating that the game's rendering engine had been completely redone from scratch, first having attempted to simply translate the Noctis IV engine into Linoleum before giving up and rewriting it. Ghignola has also mentioned experimenting with weather and particle effects, possibly including weather such as snow and dust storms in the game.

Despite Ghignola reassuring fans multiple times that he would release Noctis V, according to a recent interview with him the project is largely abandoned.

In an interview with Videogame Potpourri on May 9, 2012, he stated "[Noctis V] keeps living in a corner of my mind, on a sort of unwritten post-it note. But it's there, ready to strike as soon as it gets an opportunity to incarnate."

In a 2023 Time Extension interview Ghignola said he had no interest in "going back to programming" while appreciating fans' interest in the game, that, despite its theme of isolation, became a way to connect people.

== Reception ==
The game gained popularity in the early 2000s after receiving a very favorable review in Home of the Underdogs's list of worthwhile free games. Noctis earned a score of 9.43 out of 10 as well as the site's "Top Dog" award. The reviewer noted amongst other things the magnitude of the galaxy to explore and the total size of the simulator, which is less than five megabytes. An in-detail article by The Escapist's Phillip Scuderi noted the philosophical depth of Noctis in 2006.

Around the release of action-adventure game No Man's Sky in 2016, multiple outlets compared it to Noctis, noting that both games featured exploration of a large, procedurally-generated galaxy, and the ability to share discoveries with other players online. Noctis was described as having a distinct sense of strangeness and beauty, though being difficult to run on modern computers and with a cumbersome user interface.
