= Ouya =

Android-based microconsole by Ouya Inc.

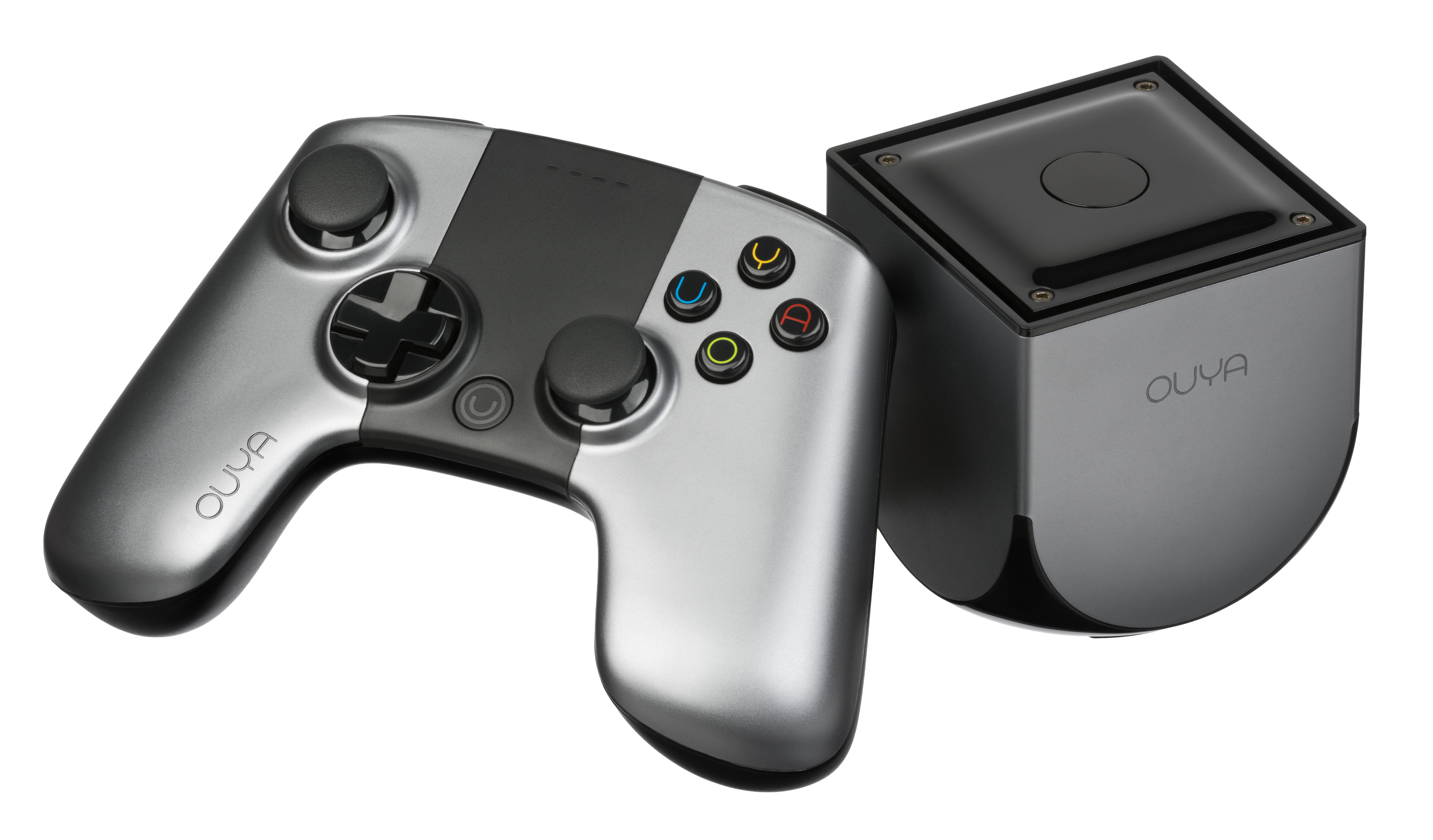
- An Ouya (right) and its accompanying controller
- Manufacturer: Ouya, Inc. (formerly Boxer8, Inc.)
- Type: Microconsole
- Released: June 25, 2013
- Lifespan: 2013–2015
- Introductory price: $99 USD £99 GBP
- Discontinued: July 27, 2015
- Units sold: ~200,000
- Media: Digital distribution
- Operating system: Android (4.1 Jelly Bean) with custom Ouya launcher
- System on a chip: Nvidia Tegra 3 (T33)
- CPU: 1.7 GHz Quad-Core ARM Cortex-A9
- Memory: 1 GB DDR3 SDRAM
- Storage: 8 GB internal flash memory 16 GB internal flash memory (2014 version)
- Display: 1x HDMI (720p, 1080p)
- Graphics: Nvidia GeForce ULP GPU
- Sound: HDMI (ARC), 2.0 channel
- Input: 1x USB 2.0; 1x Micro USB (for connection to PC)
- Controller input: Wireless controller
- Connectivity: Wi-Fi 802.11 b/g/n Bluetooth LE 4.0; Ethernet port
- Power: 12 volt DC, 1.5 ampere max via Coaxial power connector (OD 5.50 mm, ID 2.10 mm, center positive )
- Best-selling game: TowerFall (7,000)
- Website: ouya.tv at the Wayback Machine (archived 2019-03-12)

The Ouya (/ˈuːjə/ OO-yə), stylized as OUYA, is an Android-based microconsole developed by Ouya Inc. Julie Uhrman founded the project in 2012, bringing in designer Yves Béhar to collaborate on its design and Muffi Ghadiali as VP of Product Management. Development was funded via Kickstarter, raising US$8.5 million, becoming one of the website's highest-earning projects in its history.

Units started to ship to Kickstarter backers in March 2013 and were released to the general public in June 2013. It featured a store for applications and games designed specifically for the Ouya platform, the majority of which were casual games. Out of the box, Ouya supports media apps such as Twitch and the Kodi media center. It runs a modified version of Android Jelly Bean, with rooting being officially encouraged. The console's hardware design allows it to be easily opened up, requiring only a standard screwdriver for easy modding and possible hardware add-ons.

All systems can be used as development kits, allowing any Ouya owner to also be a developer, without the need for licensing fees. All games were initially required to have some kind of free-to-play aspect, whether they be completely free, have a free trial, or have optional purchasable upgrades, levels, or other in-game items. This requirement was later removed.

Despite the successful Kickstarter campaign, the Ouya became a commercial failure. Sales were lackluster, game developers failed to embrace the platform, and incentives offered to promote adoption failed, causing financial problems for Ouya Inc. and forcing the company to wind down the business. Its software assets were sold to Razer Inc., who announced the discontinuation of the console in July 2015. Razer continued to provide software support for existing Ouya units until June 2019, when it shut down the Ouya storefront, services and accounts, rendering the use of the many applications that required a check-in with the store impossible.

== History ==
Ouya was announced on July 3, 2012, as a new home video game console, led by Julie Uhrman, the chief executive officer of Santa Monica, California-based Boxer8, Inc. (later rebranded Ouya, Inc. on August 13, 2012). On July 10, Ouya started a campaign to gauge how many people were interested in the project. Boxer8 confirmed having a working prototype with in-progress software and user interface. It features an Nvidia Tegra 3 chip and a price tag of $99 ($95 for 1000 "early birds" backers of the Kickstarter campaign).

The Kickstarter fundraising goal was $950,000, with a month to reach that goal; within 8 hours it surpassed $1 million. Funding continued to increase as more models were made available at various funding levels. According to Kickstarter, in reaching its goal, Ouya holds the record for best first-day performance of any project hosted to date. Within the first 24 hours, the project attracted one backer every 5.59 seconds. Ouya became the eighth project in Kickstarter history to raise more than a million dollars and was the quickest project ever to do so. The Kickstarter campaign finished on August 9 with $8,596,475 at 904% of their goal. This made the Ouya Kickstarter the fifth-highest earning in the website's history at the time.

Ouya units for Kickstarter funders started to ship on March 28, 2013. On June 25, 2013, the Ouya was released to the public for $99.

Ouya announced the "Free the Games Fund" in July 2013 with the goal to support developers making games exclusively for their system with Ouya matching a Kickstarter campaign's pledge dollar-for-dollar if a minimum of $50,000 is raised, but only if the game will be an Ouya exclusive for six months.

In October 2013, Uhrman stated that the company planned on releasing a new iteration of the Ouya console sometime in 2014, with an improved controller, double the storage space, and better Wi-Fi. On November 23, 2013, a limited edition white Ouya with double the storage of the original and a new controller design was available for pre-order at $129.

As of January 1, 2014, the limited edition white Ouya went off sale and cannot be found on the official store, nor from any official resellers. On January 31, 2014, a new black version of the Ouya was released with double storage and new controller design.

In January 2015, Ouya received an investment of US$10 million from Alibaba with the possibility of incorporating some of Ouya technologies into Alibaba's set-top box.

In April 2015, it was revealed that Ouya was trying to sell the company because it failed to renegotiate its debt. On July 27, 2015, it was announced that Razer Inc. had acquired Ouya's employees and content library and that Ouya hardware was now discontinued. The deal does not include Ouya's hardware assets. Owners were encouraged to migrate to Razer's own Forge microconsole; Ouya's content library will be integrated into the Forge ecosystem, and "[the] Ouya brand name will live on as a standalone gaming publisher for Android TV and Android-based TV consoles." On the same day Uhrman stepped down as Ouya's CEO.

The technical team and developer relations personnel behind Ouya joined the software team of Razer, which developed its own game platform called the Forge TV. The Forge TV was discontinued in 2016.

On May 21, 2019, Razer released a statement which announced that online accounts and services would be discontinued on June 25, 2019. According to Razer, most apps would become unusable on the platform, many relying on the user accounts to work. Razer suggests that users may be able to transfer purchases to other storefront platforms like Google Play, if developers and publishers agree to such.

== Hardware ==
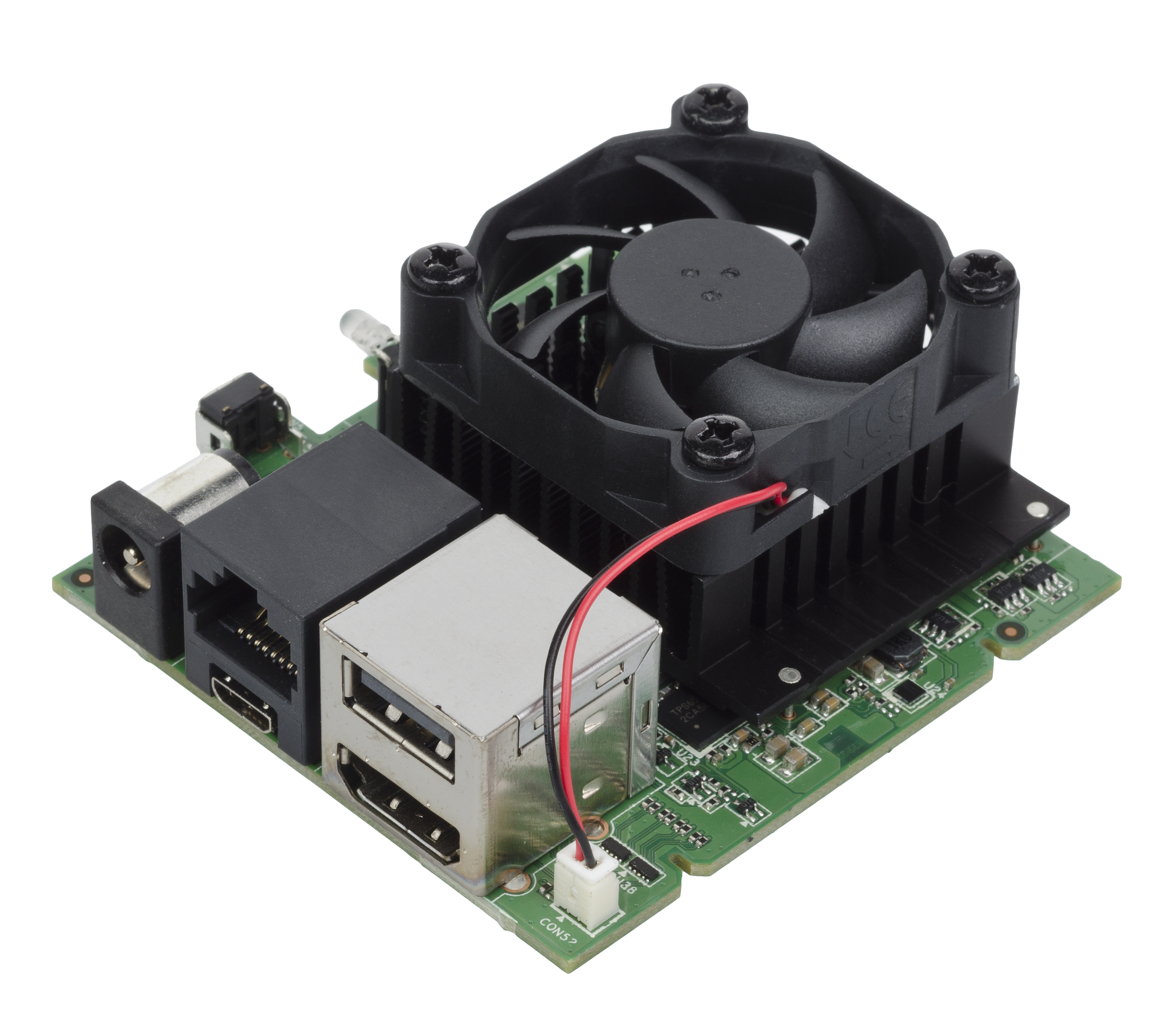
The small motherboard of the Ouya

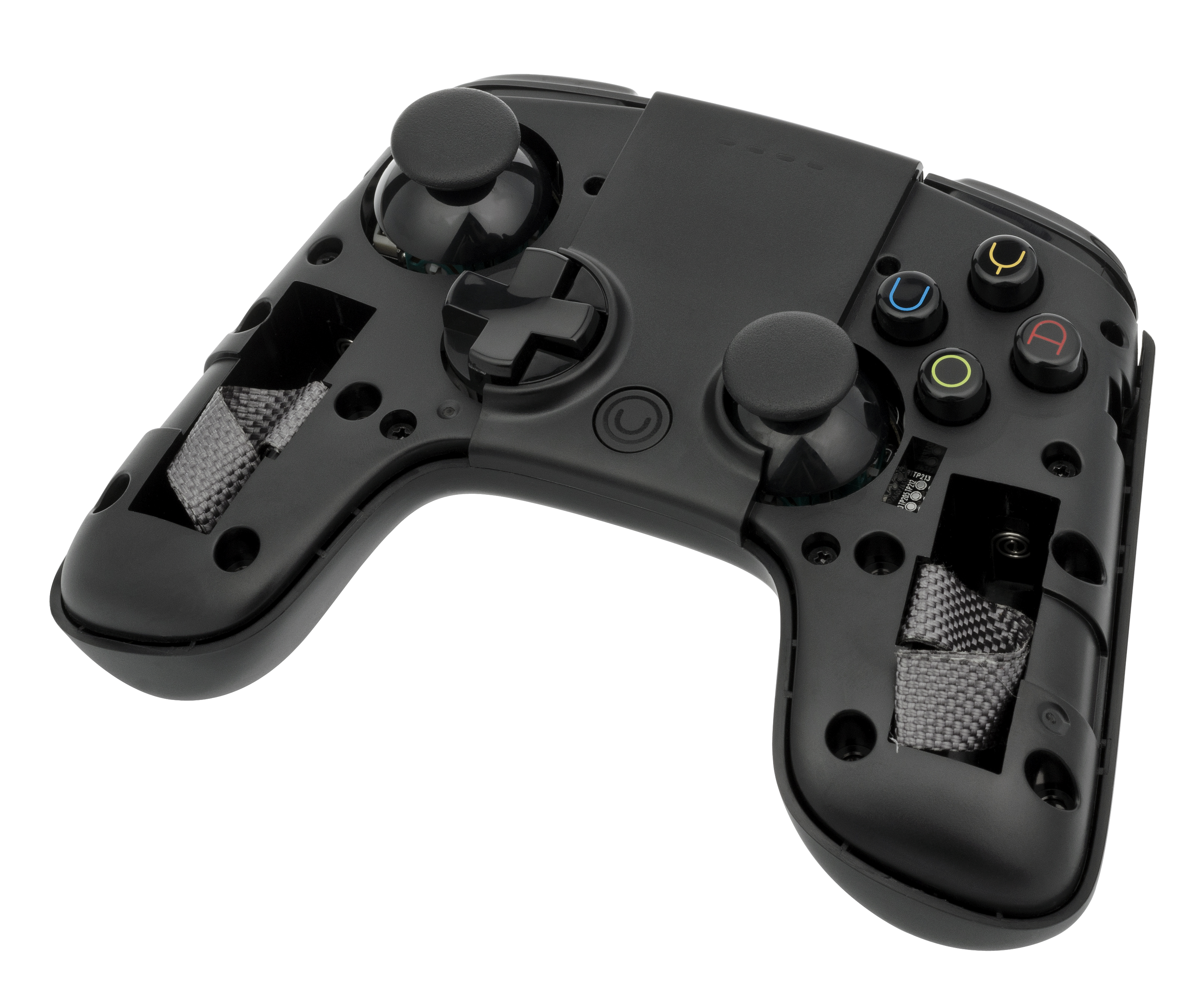
The controller with the plates removed, revealing fabric pull-tabs to remove the batteries from the inserts

The Ouya is a 75-millimetre (2.95-inch) cube designed to be used with a TV as the display via an HDMI connection. It ships with a single wireless controller, but it can also support multiple controllers. Games are available via digital distribution or can be side-loaded.

=== Specifications ===
| | Ouya |
|---|---|
| Price: | US$99.95 or US$129 |
| SoC: | Nvidia Tegra 3 T33-P-A3 |
| CPU: | ARM Cortex-A9 ×4 @ 1.7 GHz (ARMv7-A architecture) with VFPv3 floating point unit and Advanced SIMD (NEON) |
| GPU: | ULP (Ultra Low Power) GeForce @ 520 MHz (VLIW-based VEC4 units) (12.48 GFLOPS) Hardware 1080p MPEG-4 AVC/h.264 40 Mbit/s High-Profile, VC1-AP, and DivX 5/6 video decode |
| Memory (RAM): | 1 GiB DDR3-1600 SDRAM (shared between CPU and GPU) |
| USB ports: | 1 USB 2.0, 1 microUSB |
| Video output: | HDMI 1.4; 1080p or 720p resolution. Stereoscopic 3D support. |
| Audio output: | HDMI (ARC), 2.0 channel |
| Internal storage: | 8 GB eMMC flash memory (expandable via USB) |
| Networking and Wireless: | 100BASE-TX (Fast Ethernet); 802.11 b/g/n Bluetooth 4.0 LE (Low Energy) |
| Power consumption: | 4.5 watt (gaming), 1 watt (standby) |
| Power source: | 12 volt DC, 1.5 ampere max via coaxial power connector (OD 5.50 mm, ID 2.10 mm, center positive) |
| Dimensions: | 75×75×82 mm (2.95×2.95×3.23 in) |
| Weight: | 300 g (11 oz) |
| Operating system: | Android 4.1 (Jelly Bean) with custom Ouya launcher. |

Notes:

1. Hardware video decode supported by experimental XBMC using libstagefright.

=== Controller ===
The Ouya controller is a typical gamepad with dual analog sticks, a directional pad, 4 face buttons (labeled O, U, Y, and A) and pairs of back bumpers and triggers. It also includes a single-touch touchpad in the center of the controller. The Ouya controller also has magnetically attached faceplates which enclose the 2 AA batteries, one on each side of the removable plates.

Alternate controllers may be used with the console (including those from the Xbox 360, PlayStation 3, Wii and Wii U) but only for compatible games.

== Reception ==
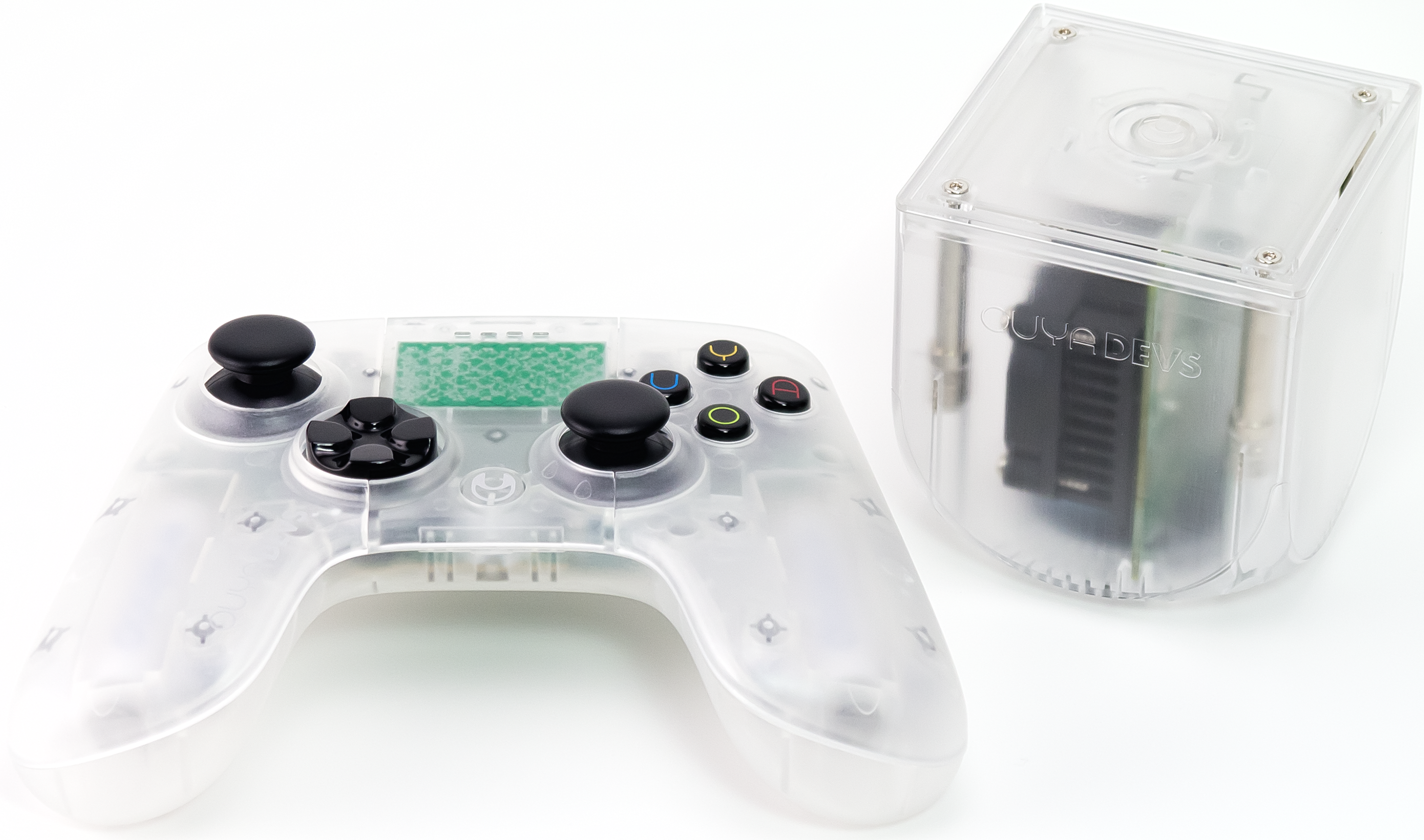
OUYA Developer Console

=== Pre-release ===
While initial reception of the Ouya was positive, raising $3.7 million on Kickstarter in the first two days, there were a number of vocal critics who were skeptical of the ability of the fledgling company to deliver a product at all. On July 12, 2012, PC Magazine's Sascha Segan ran an op-ed entitled "Why Kickstarter's Ouya Looks Like a Scam" which was critical not only of the Ouya but of all Kickstarter-funded hardware projects. Unreality Magazine defended the Ouya, stating "A scam implies some sort of intentionally illegal deceit. [...] Tapping multiple investors from multiple sources isn't a scam, it's not even illegal, it's business."

Engadget reviewed the Kickstarter pre-release version of the Ouya on April 3, 2013. While praising the low cost and ease of hacking the console, it reported issues with controller buttons becoming stuck beneath the controller plating and the right analog stick snagging on the plating. It also reported a slight lag between the controller and the console and went on to say the controller was "usable, but it's far from great."

The Verge reported similar issues with the controller and questioned its construction quality. While they praised the hacking and openness of the console, calling it "a device with lots of potential and few true limitations", the review was mostly negative and was critical of the interface and game launch choice and stated that "Ouya isn't a viable gaming platform, or a good console, or even a nice TV interface."

=== Retail reception ===
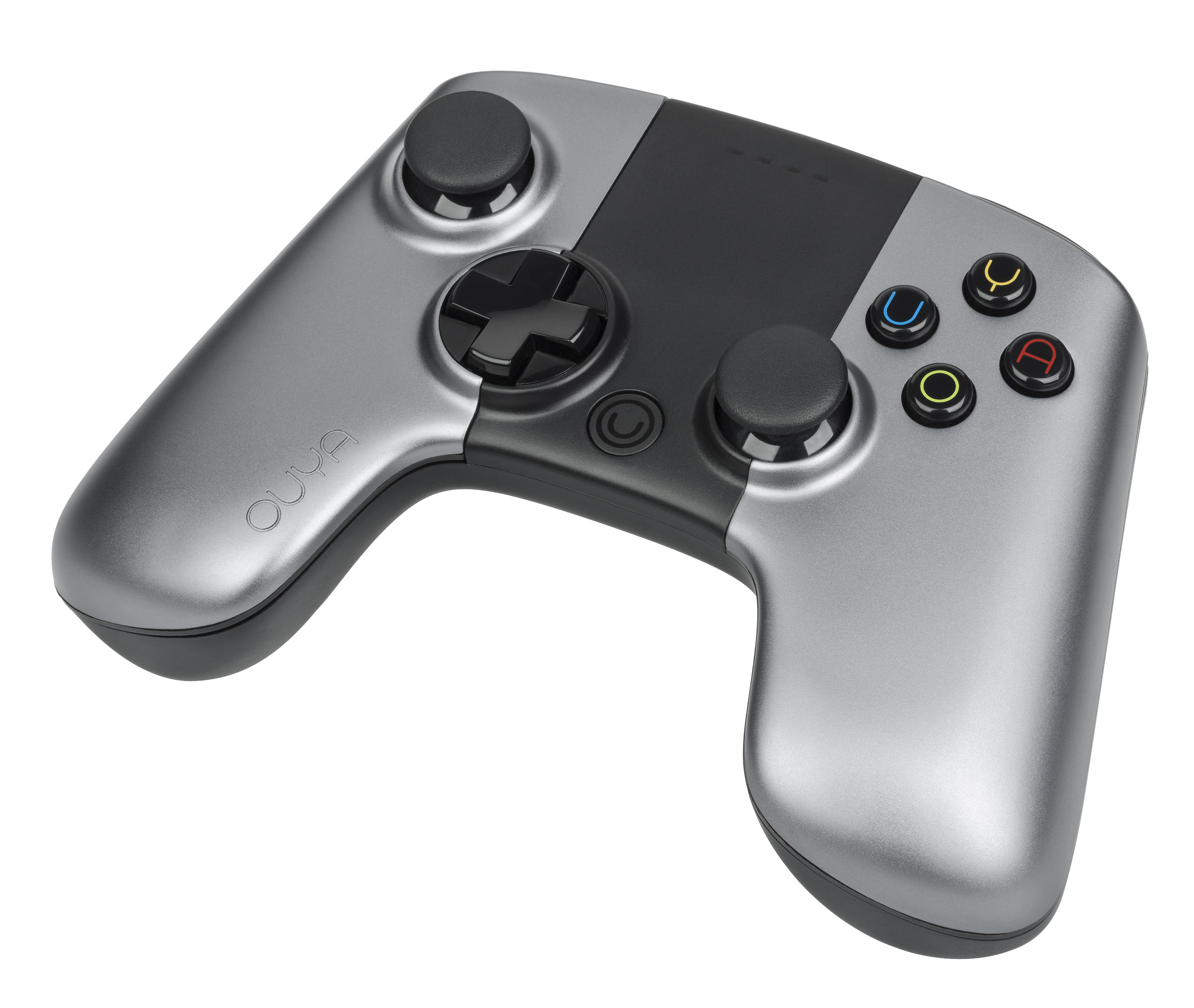
Early reviews criticized the Ouya's controller for lag and build quality issues.

Tom's Hardware summarized early media reviews of the Ouya as "lukewarm".

Engadget reviewed the retail version of the Ouya, and noted a largely improved experience as compared to what they found with their pre-release unit. Improvements to the gamepad were "huge", and they found "that the UI has been cleaned up and sped up". Engadget concluded that their "latest experience with the Android-based gaming device [left them] feeling optimistic" and that the company was "taking customer feedback seriously".

Digital Trends called the final retail console "a device with a lot of potential built with love", and called the design a "sleek and cool-looking cube filled with gamingy goodness". The mostly positive review cited a lot of potential for the future, but was tempered by noting deficiencies in performance ("as powerful as many current smartphones"), and pointing out that the Ouya won't be able to compete with the "big three" console makers on performance, but must rely on carving out a niche in the market.

ExtremeTech found that Ouya "has a number of serious faults". They mentioned the sub-par controller, the connectivity issues, and games which worked flawlessly on smartphones but stuttered on the console. Also, they remarked that "there just aren't enough worthwhile games to play".

=== Sales ===
Market analyst NPD Group described Ouya sales in its first month as "relatively light", while several outlets noted low sales of games on the service in initial reports from developers. In April 2014, developer Maddy Thorson stated that her title TowerFall, the Ouya's most popular game at the time, had only sold 7,000 copies for the console. The Ouya in total sold around 200,000 units.

== Free the Games Fund ==
In July 2013, Ouya announced the "Free the Games Fund", a scheme to help fund developers, where Ouya would match any Kickstarter campaign if a minimum target of $50,000 was reached, and provided the game remained Ouya exclusive for six months. Suspicions were raised concerning the first two games to reach the target. Commentators noticed the small number of backers each pledging a high value amount, the large number of those who had never backed a project before, as well as the use of duplicate names and avatars that included those of celebrities. This led some to suggest that the projects were artificially inflating their project's backing in order to receive extra money from Ouya. In addition, one project had a backer whose identity appeared to be taken from that of a missing person's case.

Nevertheless, Ouya rejected any suspicion regarding the backing of the projects, and planned to continue with providing funding. In September 2013, funding for one of the games that had reached its target (Elementary, My Dear Holmes) was later suspended by Kickstarter. The developers of the other funded game, Gridiron Thunder, threatened litigation against a commenter on the Kickstarter page, and further dismissed concerns that they would have no rights to official NFL branding, a license currently held by Electronic Arts. In the same month, another project, Dungeons the Eye of Draconus, caused controversy by openly stating that a relative of one developer had provided substantial additional backing in order to have the project qualify for money from the Free the Games fund. The project was removed by Ouya from the Free the Games fund, resulting in the developers removing the project from Kickstarter.

Many developers criticized the fund's rules. Sophie Houlden removed her game, Rose and Time, from the Ouya marketplace in protest. Matt Gilgenbach, who was trying to finance his game Neverending Nightmares with help from the fund, said, "It would kill me if due to other projects abusing the Free the Games Fund, people lost confidence in our project and what we are trying to do...While I believe in the idea of the Free the Games Fund, I think it definitely could use some reform in light of the potential avenues for abuse." A month later, Sophie revealed that she and several other developers had been in talks with Ouya boss Julie Uhrman, who accepted their criticism, saying: "Developers were telling us over and over, 'You're being too idealistic, and you're being too naive.' That was the part that personally took me a while to understand." Ouya changed the fund rules, including adding a dollar-per-backer limit. Satisfied the matter was resolved, Rose and Time was returned to the Ouya marketplace, and Neverending Nightmares qualified for funding under the new rules.

On September 18, 2013, Ouya modified the exclusivity clause of the fund. Developers would still not be able to release their software on mobile devices, video game consoles, and set-top boxes during the six-month exclusivity period, but they would be allowed to release on other personal computer systems, such as Windows, Mac OS X, and Linux, during that time.

== See also ==
- Free-to-play
- Homebrew (video games)
- Independent video game development
- List of Ouya software
- OnLive
- Steam Link
- GeForce Now
- Boosteroid
- Open source video game
