= List of cancelled PlayStation Vita games =

The PlayStation Vita is a handheld video game console released by Sony in 2011. The system, positioned as an attempt to appeal both traditional handhelds and mobile phone gaming, maintained a niche following through 2018, though failed to pick up on mainstream success. While the Vita would go on to have over 1,400 games released for it in its lifetime, its weak commercial performance and weaker hardware compared to other video game consoles and mobile devices multiplatform games were in development for, led to a considerable number of cancelled video games as well. This list documents games that were confirmed for the Vita at some point, but did not end up being released for it in any capacity.

== Cancelled Vita games ==
There are currently 81 games on this list. (Note: This number is always up to date by this script.)

List of cancelled PlayStation Vita games
Title(s)	Notes/Reasons	Developer	Publisher
13 Sentinels: Aegis Rim	Originally conceived in 2013 as a Vita and PlayStation 4 game, the game was continually delayed out of the Vita's lifespan and cancelled in 2018, only releasing on PS4 in 2019 and Nintendo Switch in 2022.	Vanillaware	Atlus
140	In June 2016, it was announced that Abstraction Games and Double Fine Productions would be porting the rhythm game 140 (2013) to PlayStation 4, PlayStation Vita, Xbox One, Wii U, and Nintendo 3DS, with the ports scheduled for release later that year. However, the Vita and 3DS ports were never released.	Abstraction Games	Double Fine Productions
99 Bricks Wizard Academy	A port of the 2014 mobile phone game was announced for Vita, but cancelled in October 2015 because the developers wished to switch focus on developing their next title, Tricky Towers, instead.	WeirdBeard	WeirdBeard
Action Henk	Announced in June 2015 for the Vita, PlayStation 3, PlayStation 4, Xbox One, and Wii U, the Vita version never materialized when the other versions all released in 2016.	RageSquid	Curve Digital
AeternoBlade II	The game was originally announced in October 2015 for the Vita and Nintendo 3DS. In early 2017, a number of members of the development team resigned, forcing the developers to restart development, and causing them to cancel the handheld versions in favor of developing and releasing PlayStation 4, Xbox One, and Nintendo Switch versions in 2019 instead.	Corecell Technology	Corecell Technology
Against the Blade	Announced in 2014 at a Sony press conference regarding their move to start releasing games in China, the game never materialized in any capacity.	Spark Cube	
Anonymous;Code	Originally announced for the Vita and PlayStation 4 in 2017, the games lengthy development period delayed its release beyond the Vita's lifespan. The Vita version was cancelled in favor of a PS4 and Nintendo Switch release in late 2021.	Mages, Chiyomaru Studio	Mages
Asaki, Yumemishi (The Tale of Genji)	An entry of the Tale of Genji series was announced in September 2015, but the game never released after the publisher's parent company, Artmove officially suspended business later in the month.	Mio	QuinRose
Assault Android Cactus	Released for a variety of PC platforms in 2015, various console ports occurred across into 2016, including a planned Vita version. However, it was cancelled August 2017. While no reason was given, the developers had said prior to the cancellation that they did not expect much of a financial return on the Vita version.	Witch Beam	Witch Beam
The Banner Saga	After its 2014 release on PC and mobile platforms, Vita and PlayStation 4, versions were announced that same year. Despite 2016 releases on PS4 and Xbox One in 2016, development of the Vita version lagged behind. In July 2017, it was announced that the developers were having trouble getting the game engine to run well on the Vita, and it was hindering updates for other platforms. A version was released on Nintendo Switch instead in 2018.	Stoic Studio	Versus Evil
Untitled BioShock game	Initially announced for the Vita at E3 2011, Bioshock series creator Ken Levine conceded that development had not even started almost 2 years later in February 2013, and another year later in February 2014, Irrational Games closed down altogether, with the game never releasing in any capacity.	Irrational Games	2K Games
Bizerta: Silent Evil	Development on the game started on PlayStation Vita before realizing the hardware was not powerful enough to fulfill the game's vision. Development was moved to Wii, and was reportedly in development for multiple years, but never released in any capacity.	Edrox Interactive	
Bloodstained: Ritual of the Night	The Vita version of the game was cancelled in 2018 in response to Sony's announcement that they were discontinuing the Vita in 2019, though the game still released on all other platforms planned in its Kickstarter.	ArtPlay	505 Games
Broforce	Announced for the Vita and PlayStation 4 during E3 2014, the Vita version was quietly announced as cancelled, without reason, in September 2015. Versions still released for PC platforms, PS4, and the Nintendo Switch in the following years.	Free Lives	Devolver Digital
Castle Conqueror V	Announced in 2014 at a Sony press conference regarding their move to start releasing games in China, the game never materialized in any capacity.	Circle Entertainment	
The Chainsaw Incident	Announced in 2014 for the Vita and PlayStation 4, in late 2016, the developers announced that they had run out of funding, and the game never materialized on any platforms.	Origo Games	Origo Games
Chroma Squad	Released on PC platforms in 2015, additional versions for Vita, PlayStation 4, Xbox One, and mobile platform were announced in 2016. While all other versions, and an additional Nintendo Switch version were released, the Vita version was announced as cancelled in 2017.	Behold Studios	Bandai Namco Entertainment
Chronos Materia	Announced exclusively for the Vita in June 2013 with a release date of September 26, 2013, the game was indefinitely delayed before its release, and was not officially cancelled until much later in April 2016, and never released in any capacity.	Gust Co. Ltd.	Tecmo Koei
City Shrouded in Shadow	Originally announced for the Vita and PlayStation 4 in September 2015, after an extended year long period with no updates, the game was announced to be a PS4-only release, with the Vita version being cancelled for "various reasons".	Granzella	Bandai Namco Entertainment
Cloudberry Kingdom	A Vita version of the multi-platform release was announced, but never received a concrete release date, and never materialized.	Pwnee Studios	Ubisoft
A Clumsy Adventure	A 3D platformer in development from 2013 by Dutch indie studio Excamedia. An early access build of the PC version was made available on GameJolt in December 2013, and another demo was playable at Gamescom 2014. It was earmarked for a 2015 release.	Excamedia	Excamedia
Crows: Burning Edge	A game adaption of the Crows manga was announced for the Vita and PlayStation 4 in July 2015, but the Vita version was cancelled for undisclosed reasons in August 2016.	Bandai Namco Entertainment	Bandai Namco Entertainment
C-Wars	While the game's Kickstarter stretch-goal for releases on Vita, Nintendo 3DS, Wii U, Linux, and Android, only the Windows and macOS versions ever released, in 2015.	Onipunks Studio	Onipunks Studio
Untitled Daito Giken Kōshiki Pachi-Slot Simulator game	An entry in Paon's long-running pachi-slot video game series was announced at the Tokyo Game Show in 2011, but never materialized.	Paon	Paon
DiscStorm	Announced in March 2015 for Vita and PC platforms, the Vita version never materialized.	XMPT Games	XMPT Games
Dungeon Defenders	Originally announced at Sony's January 2011 conference where they first revealed the Vita, where its tech demo was used to demonstrate how developer's could create PlayStation 3-level games on Vita, the title was cancelled in June 2012, so the company could divert resources towards development of another game. The game still released on PS3, Xbox One, and PC/mobile platforms.	Trendy Entertainment	Reverb Communications
Dragon's Racing	Listed by Sony as a game in development for the Vita by Ignition Entertainment in November 2011, the game never materialized, as Ignition subsequently suffered financial troubles and went out of business in 2012.	UTV Ignition Entertainment	UTV Ignition Entertainment
Drive! Drive! Drive!	Announced in September 2015 for the Vita and PlayStation 4, the Vita version was cancelled later in the year so the game's sole developer could focus on publishing the PS4 version.	Different Cloth	Choice Provisions
Egg 'n Roll	A 3D action game announced by Turkish indie developer Lamagama for Vita and iOS for a late 2012 release, the game never materialized.	Lamagama Entertainment	Lamagama Entertainment
Elliot Quest	A Vita version of the Wii U and PC game was announced in July 2015 for a 2016 release, though it was cancelled in May 2016 due to its game engine being incompatible to the Vita's hardware, though versions still released for Nintendo 3DS and Nintendo Switch in 2016 and 2017, respectively.	Ansimuz Games	PlayEveryWare Games
Energy Hook	Announced for the Vita, PlayStation 4, and Windows, the Vita version was revealed to be cancelled in January 2016.	Happion Laboratories	Happion Laboratories
Fenix Rage/Fenix Furia	Originally released on Windows in 2014, versions for the Vita, PlayStation 4, and Xbox 360 were announced shortly afterwards for 2015. However, when console version of the game was delayed into 2016 and rebranded as Fenix Furia due to "unforeseen circumstances", the Vita was dropped as a release platform.	Green Lava Studios	Green Lava Studios
Final Fantasy Agito Plus	Originally released in an episodic for iOS and Android mobile devices across 2014 and 2015, a Vita version with all of the game's content was announced for 2015. However, the Vita version was later delayed, and then cancelled outright by September 2015. Technical bottlenecks and network combability problems were cited as reason for the cancellation.	Square Enix	Square Enix
Forgotten Memories: Alternate Realities Director's Cut	Originally released for iOS mobile devices, all proposed console and PC ports, Vita included, were cancelled in February 2017, with the developer's feeling that the game, designed for mobile devices, was not translating well to other platforms.	Psychose Interactive	Psychose Interactive
Four Sided Fantasy	The game was initially announced for the Vita, PlayStation 4, and Windows in 2015. However, the following year, when developers changed publishers from Curve Digital to Serenity Forge, the Vita version was dropped, while the other versions released later in the year.	Ludo Land	Curve Digital/Serenity Forge
Galak-Z: The Dimensional	Originally announced for the Vita and PlayStation 4 for a 2014 release, the game was delayed into 2015, and the Vita version was cancelled in July 2015 because they development team could not get the game running properly on the Vita's weaker hardware, while the PS4 version released the following month.	17-Bit	17-Bit
Great Little War Game	Released on mobile devices in 2011, the announced plans for a Vita version were described by the developer as "long buried" in September. Reason cited were than Sony halted sale of the game because the multiplayer components had not transferred to the Vita game, even though the game itself otherwise was running on the platform.	Rubicon Developments	Viacom Games
Gunscape	The Vita version of the game was cancelled in October 2016, with the developer explaining they could not get the game running on the Vita.	Blowfish Studios	Blowfish Studios
Guns Up!	Originally announced for the Vita, PlayStation 3, and PlayStation 4, the Vita and PS3 versions were cancelled to help the team focus on being able to release the PS4 version. Difficulty in getting it to run on the Vita's weaker hardware was also cited as a reason for its cancellation.	Valkyrie Entertainment	Sony Interactive Entertainment
Hand of Fate	Originally announced for the Vita alongside PlayStation 4, Xbox One, and PC versions, the Vita version was cancelled a few months after the other versions released in 2015, with the development team stating that they were unable to get the game running on the Vita's weaker hardware.	Defiant Development	Defiant Development
The Hero Trap	Originally announced for Vita, PlayStation 4, and PC platforms, the game was cancelled and not released in any capacity. The developer noted that while they met their Kickstarter fundraising goal, it was not enough to fund the game, and they had been unsuccessful in finding an outside publisher to help either.	Smashworx	Smashworx
Hyper Light Drifter	Originally announced for the Vita, PlayStation 4, Xbox One, Wii U, and PC platforms, the Vita and Wii U version were later cancelled due to the developers struggling to get it running on their respective hardware, and health issues that were also taking their toll. Other versions released in 2016, and a handheld version finally released on the Nintendo Switch in 2018.	Heart Machine	Heart Machine
Killing Bites	A video game adaption of the Killing Bites manga was announced in 2015 and shown at that year's Tokyo Game Show. Originally targeting a 2016 release, it was indefinitely delayed, and then fully cancelled in September 2017 after the closure of its development company.	Nex Entertainment	Fields
Kodoku	A survival horror game announced in early 2014 for the Vita and PlayStation 4, the game was later cancelled due to the development team's financial issues. Some members of the team attempted to revive it as Kodoku 3D in 2016, but this version did not target a Vita release, and never materialized either.	Carnivore Studio	Carnivore Studio
Legend of Raven (Yatagarasu)	Originally released on PC platforms in 2011 under the name Yatagarasu, game publisher Nicalis announced plans to release the game under the title Legend of Raven across multiple platforms. Initially, a 3DS version was planned, but Nicalis later reported this version was cancelled in favor of a PlayStation Vita version due to fan feedback. Plans expanded beyond just a Vita version to PlayStation 4 and Xbox One versions as well, though no versions have materialized beyond its original PC release.	Circle Edge	Nicalis
Mighty No. 9	A high-profile spiritual successor to the Mega Man series by longtime series producer Kenji Inafune successfully raised funding for a wide variety of platforms in 2013. While announced console and PC versions released across mid-2016 to a tepid response, the versions for the 3DS and PlayStation Vita never materialized.	Comcept, Inti Creates	Deep Silver
MilitAnt	Originally announced for PlayStation 4, PlayStation 3, PlayStation Vita and PC, only the PS4 and PC versions were released.	Xibalba Studios	Xibalba Studios
Minecraft: Story Mode	Announced for release on a wide variety of platforms starting in October 2015, with planned releases for the Vita and Wii U on a later date, the Vita release never materialized for any of the game's episodes.	Telltale Games	Telltale Games
Moon Hunters	Originally announced and funded through Kickstarter for the Vita, PlayStation 4, Xbox One, and PC platforms, the Vita version was cancelled slightly after the release of the other versions, with the developers saying they could not get the game running on the Vita hardware without making major cuts into the game's graphics, and even that would not solve their ongoing problem with long load times. A portable version was later released on the Nintendo Switch the following year.	Kitfox Games	Kitfox Games
Mr. Ink Jet	Announced and present in playable form at E3 2011. The game involved using the Vita's camera to take a picture of a person, which was used to create a playable character, and then use the Vita's rear touch pad to control the character through a series of obstacles and challenges. The game's demo was not received well—IGN singled it out as one of the low points in Sony's conference that year, and the game was cancelled.	AQ Interactive	AQ Interactive
Never Alone	Announced for a variety of console, PC, and mobile platforms, the Vita version of the game was cancelled due to technical problems the developers were having getting it running on the Vita hardware.	Upper One Games	E-Line Media
Nier	While never publicly announced as a title in development, in 2015, Square Enix staff mentioned that there had been plans to bring the game to the Vita back in 2011, but the internal development team to be tasked to it ended up being assigned to Dragon Quest X instead, and the project was eventually cancelled.	Square Enix	Square Enix
Nom Nom Galaxy	Originally announced for the Vita and PlayStation 4, the Vita version was dropped during development so the developers could focus resources on getting the PlayStation 4 version, which eventually saw release in 2015.	Q-Games	Double Eleven
Not a Hero	Released for PC platforms in 2015, versions for the Vita, PlayStation 4, and Xbox One were announced for the following year. However, the Vita version was cancelled after the development team struggled to get it running on the Vita's hardware.	Roll7	Devolver Digital
Orc Attack: Flatulent Rebellion	Announced for the Vita, PlayStation 3, Xbox 360 and Windows, and released across 2013 and 2014, the Vita version never materialized.	Casual Brothers Games	GameMill Entertainment
Otome Ken Musashi	Originally planned for a 2017 release on the Vita, it was cancelled in favor releases for Android, and iOS mobile devices.	Karinto	Karin Entertainment
Untitled PachiPara game	An entry in the pachinko series was announced for the Vita at the Tokyo Game Show 2011, but never materialized.	Irem	Irem
Pier Solar and the Great Architects	Released on a variety of platforms across 2014, A Vita version was announced in October 2014, but never materialized.	WaterMelon	WaterMelon
Poncho	Originally released for the PlayStation 4, Wii U, and Windows across 2015 and 2016, the Vita version of the game was announced as cancelled in January 2017. While the developers disclosed that they could not legally give exact reasons for the cancellation, a difficult development process, contentious relationship with their publisher, and the fact that none of the game's release made the company any profit were all mentioned in the game's retrospective.	Delve Interactive	Rising Star Games
Pro Evolution Soccer entry	Konami announced they would be releasing a Vita entry of their long-running soccer video game series at the Tokyo Game Show in 2011, though no entry was ever released.	Konami	Konami
Quantum Suicide	A visual novel similar to Danganronpa originally announced on PC platforms in 2020. In November 2020, the developers announced they were starting work on a Vita version, though they conceded it would be a difficult effort that would take a long time and may not be finished in the Vita's lifespan. Sony stopped accepting Vita game submissions just 9 months later in July 2021, and the game never materialized.	Cotton Candy Cyanide	Sekai Project
Rail Wars!	Originally scheduled for release in November 2014, the game was announced as cancelled much later in January 2016, citing its unsuccessful protracted development period and other "various reasons" not expanded upon.	5pb.	5pb.
Regalia: Of Men And Monarchs	A tactical role-playing video game with a successful Kickstarter campaign in 2015 to release the game on PC platforms, PlayStation 4, and Vita. The PC version in May 2017, while a deluxe edition, Regalia: Royal Edition was later released for PS4 and Xbox One in 2018. The Vita version was cancelled in favor of a Nintendo Switch version released the same year.	Pixelated Milk	Pixelated Milk
Road Not Taken	Originally envisioned as a mobile phone game, the developer's perceived saturation of the market, and Sony agreeing to partner with them, changed the development plans for the game to be released on the Vita and PlayStation 4. While the game released as planned for the PS4 in 2014, the Vita version was "severely delayed" due to development issues, including the fact that the middleware company assisting with it had decided to stop working on Vita games. Windows and mobile phone versions were released by 2016, but the Vita version never materialized.	Spry Fox	Spry Fox
Ronin	Originally released on PC platforms in 2015, versions for the Vita and PlayStation 4 were announced as well, but only the PlayStation 4 ever materialized in 2016.	Tomasz Wacławek	Devolver Digital
Samurai Gunn	Originally released for Windows in 2013, versions for the Vita and PlayStation 4 were announced in the same year, but neither PlayStation version ever materialized.	Teknopants	Maxistentialism
Untitled Senko no Ronde game	A Vita entry in the Senko no Ronde series was announced in 2012 for release the following year, but never materialized in any capacity. The game was only in its planning stages in its announcement, and the developer conceded that the title may have been very different from other entries in the series.	G.rev	G.rev
Untitled Shin Megami Tensei game	Atlus announced that an entry in their Shin Megami Tensei series would release for the Vita but no such entry ever materialized across the Vita's lifespan. While Persona 4 Golden (2012) is a spinoff of the series, an entry in the Shin Megami Tensei was announced separately, and listed as a separate entry in Sony's upcoming game lists.	Atlus	Atlus
Snapshot	Just prior to its PC release in 2012, versions for the Vita and PlayStation 3 were announced for release by the end of the year, though neither PlayStation versions ever materialized.	Retro Affect	Retro Affect
Soft Body	A Vita version of the 2016 PlayStation 4 and Windows releases was reportedly "coming soon" by the game's developer, though a Vita version never materialized.	Bodysoft	Bodysoft
Song of Memories	A visual novel originally announced for the Vita and PlayStation 4, as development progressed and content within the game expanded, the developers cancelled the Vita version. A Nintendo Switch version was later announced, cancelled for years, and then revived and released in 2023.	Pure Wish	FTL Entertainment
Space Dave!	A follow up to Whoa Dave! (2014) was announced for a 2016 release, but was delayed out of the Vita's lifespan, and only ended up releasing on the Nintendo Switch instead in late 2018.	Choice Provisions	Choice Provisions
Starlight Tactics	A turn based space combat game originally announced for PlayStation 4, Xbox One, PC and mobile platforms. A version for the Vita was planned if the developers could get the right version of Unity running the Vita. Only the Windows version ever materialized.	Escape Hatch Entertainment	Escape Hatch Entertainment
Starlight Titanium	The game was announced for a variety of platforms - Vita included - though no versions ever materialized.	Escape Hatch Entertainment	Escape Hatch Entertainment
Tales from the Borderlands	A Vita version of the multiplatform game was announced at E3 2014, but never materialized, despite the game's wide release across many platforms in the decade following.	Telltale Games	Telltale Games
Unmechanical: Extended Edition	Originally released on PC and mobile platforms across 2012 and 2013, an Extended Edition was announced for PlayStation 3, PlayStation 4, and the Vita in August 2014. However, by the end of the year, the developers sent out a press release that the Vita version had been cancelled for the time being, and while they left the door open to pick it back up in the future, the Vita version never released.	Grip Games	Grip Games
Warrior's Lair / Ruin	Originally announced as Ruin by Sony at E3 2011 as a cross-platform PlayStation 3 and Vita game due out in 2012. The game was heavily promoted across 2011, with outlets such as IGN being given access to playable builds of the game, but the status on the game went quiet moving into 2012, where it missed E3 2012 and its release year entirely. By July 2013, the game was announced to be cancelled on both platforms.	Idol Minds	Sony Computer Entertainment
Wonder Flick R	A cross-platform JRPG announced for iOS, Android, Nintendo 3DS, Xbox One, PlayStation 3, PlayStation 4, PlayStation Vita, and Wii U. The game was intended to support cross-saving, allowing the player to save progress on one platform and pick up where they left off on another. Gameplay also occurred on two separate screens, whether it be on dual screen platforms like Wii U and 3DS, or through other means like remote play. While the mobile versions released in early 2014 in Japan, it suffered from a troubled launch and short lifespan, being shut down just a year later, leading to the cancellation of all console versions.	Level-5	Level-5
Whack 'em Zack	A multiplayer brawler in the vein of Whac-A-Mole, developed by Dutch indie studio Excamedia as a spin-off of A Clumsy Adventure. A build was made playable to attendees at Firstlook in the Netherlands in October 2015. As a cross-platform release it was also intended to launch on Steam.	Excamedia	Excamedia
Zodiac: Orcanon Odyssey	Versions for the Vita, PlayStation 4, iOS and PC were all in development, though only the iOS version ever released in 2015.	Kobojo	Kobojo
Zone of the Enders HD Collection	Originally announced for the PlayStation 3 and Xbox 360 at E3 2011, a Vita version was later announced at Tokyo Game Show 2011, but then later cancelled shortly before its PS3/360 release.	Kojima Productions	Konami
