= Astria Ascending =

- Cover art for Astria Ascending, featuring Ulan.
- Developer: Artisan Studios
- Publisher: Dear Villagers
- Director: Julien Bourgeois
- Writer: Kazushige Nojima
- Composer: Hitoshi Sakimoto
- Engine: Unity
- Platforms: Windows; Nintendo Switch; PlayStation 4; PlayStation 5; Xbox One; Xbox Series X/S
- Release: September 30, 2021
- Genres: Role-playing, platform
- Mode: Single-player

Astria Ascending is a 2021 role-playing game developed by Artisan Studios and published by Dear Villagers. Set in the fantasy world of Orcanon, the story of Astria Ascending follows a group of demigods called the "Fated Eight". They act as the agents of the goddess Yuno, who presides over the integrity of a multicultural society governed by a doctrine known as the Harmony and populated by sentient beings of various species.

The gameplay of Astria Ascending revolve around the player's interactions with non-player characters, objects, and enemies in hand-drawn 2D environments within the context of multiple video game genres. The game was released for Windows, Nintendo Switch, PlayStation 4, PlayStation 5, Xbox One, and Xbox Series X/S. Astria Ascending was met with mixed critical reception.

== Gameplay ==
Astria Ascending primarily features two modes of play, which incorporate gameplay conventions and mechanics from the platformer and Japanese role-playing game genres. The player controls the on-screen character, a soldier named Ulan, from a 2D side-scrolling perspective. The player acquires quests through Ulan's dealings with non-player characters, and solves puzzles through her manipulation of environmental objects. The game world of Astria Ascending features over 20 dungeons, and five unique cities.

Players may approach or avoid enemies which are integrated into the open field; once Ulan touches an enemy, the screen transitions into a separate battle screen. Combat in Astria Ascending is turn-based, with players in full control of an active party of four combatants. During the player's turn, any party member may be swapped out with another from a selection of up to eight characters. Attack abilities are tied to different elemental attributes, which produces different results depending on a combatant character's individual strengths and weaknesses in relation to specific elements.

Astria Ascending occasionally depicts Ulan mounted on a flying creature in cutscenes and playable segments. Aerial combat levels where players take control of the flying mount feature scrolling shooter gameplay: using the creature's projectile weapon, which can be rotated between different elements, players must along the way battle waves of assorted flying enemies which respond differently to each variety of elemental attack. The weapon of Ulan's mount may be upgraded with greater capabilities if the player collects power-up items from slain enemies. To complete an aerial level, players must defeat the level's boss, and the player's score accumulated from defeated enemies is logged and displayed. Astria Ascending also features a collectible card-based minigame called "J-Ster", which is played as a strategic hexagonal board game.

== Development and release ==
Astria Ascending was developed by French-Canadian video game developer Artisan Studios, with Dear Villagers as the publisher. Astria Ascending feature the contributions of several developers who had previously worked on the Final Fantasy series as well as Kobojo's 2015 mobile title Zodiac: Orcanon Odyssey. Narrative Director Kazushige Nojima provided the world direction, plot, story, and wrote much of its dialogue. Hitoshi Sakimoto composed the score as its Music Director. While Astria Ascending has no direct connection to Zodiac, both games are set in a world conceived by Nojima called Orcanon. Astria Ascending also adapts the art style and graphical assets of Zodiac, which were developed by CyDesignation.

Astria Ascending was first announced in March 2021. By June 2021, it was confirmed for a multiplatform launch on September 30, 2021 for Windows, Nintendo Switch, PlayStation 4, PlayStation 5, Xbox One, and Xbox Series X/S. It was also included with the Xbox Game Pass subscription service upon release.

== Reception ==
Reception

Aggregate score
Aggregator	Score
Metacritic	PC: 68/100; NS: 62/100; PS5: 63/100; XSXS: 67/100

Astria Ascending received mixed or average reviews from critics, according to review aggregator Metacritic.
