= Ciel Nosurge =

2012 video game

- Japanese boxart
- Developer: Gust
- Publisher: Koei Tecmo
- Platforms: PlayStation Vita, Nintendo Switch, PlayStation 4, Microsoft Windows
- Release: JP: April 26, 2012; Re:Incarnation; JP: February 21, 2013; Offline; JP: October 2, 2014; DX; JP: March 4, 2021
- Genres: Life simulation, social game

Ciel Nosurge (Note: full name Surge Concerto: Ciel nosurge (Japanese: シェルノサージュ〜失われた星へ捧ぐ詩〜, Hepburn: Sherunosāju 〜 Ushinawareta Hoshi e Sasagu Uta 〜), with the title translating to "World of the Girl -Requiem to a Lost Star-") is a life simulation game for the PlayStation Vita developed by Gust. The player's objective is to help Ion, a girl with amnesia, regain her memories by entering her mind, which is shown as a broken world which the player can repair. Although not a continuation of the Ar tonelico series, it takes place in the same universe with many of the same elements and expands on the series mythos. Ciel Nosurge was the first game to be developed by Gust after their merger with Koei Tecmo.

The game's first version was released on April 26, 2012. The original cart contained just the first episode of the game, with additional episodes gradually being released as downloadable content (DLC) via the PlayStation Network. Ciel nosurge Re:Incarnation, a re-release containing all of the original game's patches and DLC, including episodes one through four and a voucher to download episode five, was released on February 21, 2013. A total of twelve episodes were released in total, which are divided in three arcs: the Trials Arc, the Downfall Arc and the Empress Arc. An offline-only version of the game titled Ciel noSurge Offline was released on October 2, 2014. In September 2015, Koei Tecmo announced that all versions of the game would remain exclusive available to Japan, with the company having no intentions on translating or releasing it in any other regions or languages.

A continuation of the series for the Vita and PlayStation 3, titled Ar Nosurge, was released on March 6, 2014. Despite Ciel Nosurge staying in Japan, the sequel, a JRPG, was later released in English regions.

A remastered version, Ciel Nosurge DX, was released on March 4, 2021, in Japan for Nintendo Switch, PlayStation 4 and Microsoft Windows.

== Gameplay ==
Ciel Nosurge is a life simulation game. The player is introduced to Ionasal.kkll.Preciel, (Note: Ionasal.kkll.Preciel (イオナサル・ククルル・プリシェール, Ionasaru Kukururu Purishēru)) shortened to Ion, (Japanese VA: Ai Kakuma), a girl with amnesia who lives in another dimension. The player's objective is to help Ion recover her lost memories. Ion is a candidate for the next emperor in her world but lives on her own; the player can build a romantic relationship with Ion, shown by a separate "love meter",) by interacting with her. Ion may make adjustments to her lifestyle timing, which will eventually match the player's the longer the game has been played.

Another gameplay element of Ciel Nosurge is the ability to create fairies known as Sharl (Note: Sharl (シャール)) from scanning barcodes. Different barcodes create a different type of Sharl, which are needed to repair Ion's mind. The game also has a system where players can type short messages for other players. The game has been referred to as a social game due to its heavy focus on socializing with other players and the requirement to be connected to PlayStation Network to play. At the time of its release, many of the game's online servers were not working properly, but that problem has since been fixed by Gust through a series of patches.

== Setting ==
The world of Ciel Nosurge was designed with an intent to give Japanese players a sense of nostalgia; for example with buildings from the Shōwa era. Ion herself lives in a world called Ra Ciela. Ra Ciela is nearing destruction due to the expansion of its sun, Bezel; and due to this, most of its population built floating cities called Colons to protect themselves; while the poor still live on the ground.

== Release ==
The game was released as a series of episodes, episode one being the original cart. As of February 2014, ten episodes have been released. Episodes two through ten were released as DLC for a few hundred yen each on PlayStation Network. Each episode is estimated to take around seven hours to complete. Other than episodes and patches, other minor add-ons have been released on PSN, such as costumes, extra scenarios and dialogue packs for the interactions with Ion.

Midway through 2013, Gust released additional contents: bundles containing the entirety of the chapters for both the Trials and Downfall Arcs, bundles containing all costumes, additional Sharl types and even a paid patch that repaired at once all of the Repair Points in Ion's Dream World, allowing the player to see the events without waiting for the Sharls to do the repairs. All of this can be bought as a single bundle, as well.

== Reception and sales ==
Japan's Famitsu magazine scored Ciel Nosurge 31 out of 40. Merchandise for the game include a mousepad. In the week from April 23 to April 29, Ciel nosurge ranked number one in PlayStation Vita games sales (33,324 per week) and fourth overall, behind Resident Evil: Operation Raccoon City (PlayStation 3 version), Mario Party 9, and Fire Emblem Awakening, respectively.

== Future releases ==
A continuation of the series for the Vita and PlayStation 3, titled Ar Nosurge, was released on March 6, 2014. Despite Ciel Nosurge staying in Japan, the sequel, a JRPG, was later released in English regions.

Surge Concerto DX is a Nosurge collection consisting of Ar Nosurge DX and Ciel Nosurge DX announced in Japan on June 25, 2020. This collection is a re-release of Ciel nosurge and Ar nosurge. It was originally scheduled to release on January 28, 2021, in Japan for Nintendo Switch, PlayStation 4 and Microsoft Windows, but was later delayed to March 4, 2021.

== See also ==
- Chronos Materia - a new IP proposed by Gust in 2013 that would have shared elements of the Ar Nosurge and Atelier series that was cancelled in 2016.
