= Paprium =

2020 video game

- Developer: WaterMelon
- Publisher: WaterMelon
- Designer: Gwénaël Godde
- Programmer: Gwénaël Godde
- Artists: Andrew Bado; Luis Martins; Tim Jonsson
- Composers: David Burton; Trevin Hughes
- Platform: Mega Drive
- Release: WW: December 16, 2020
- Genre: Beat 'em up
- Modes: Single-player, multiplayer

Paprium is a side-scrolling beat 'em up video game for the Mega Drive developed by studio WaterMelon and released in 2020. It was announced as part of a crowd-funding pitch in 2012. Development took eight years, with little to no communication with game's backers or the press, and the game was widely considered to be vaporware.

== Gameplay ==
A two-player game

Paprium is a beat 'em up game similar in style to other beat 'em up games that came out on the Sega Mega Drive in the late 80s and early 90s like Golden Axe and Streets of Rage, with visuals styled after various pieces of media in the cyberpunk genre. The game offers three modes, "Original", "Arcade", and an unlockable "Arena". Original and Arcade mode are playable initially, with Original mode featuring cut-scenes and player-chosen progression, while Arcade mode is styled after retro-games of the era with set progression; however, it is unique due to new routes which are unlocked by playing the Original Mode. Arena mode is unlocked after progression in Original mode, and it is a survival type mode with up to four players, but only if each of the four players use the WaterMelon produced Grand Stick III arcade stick.

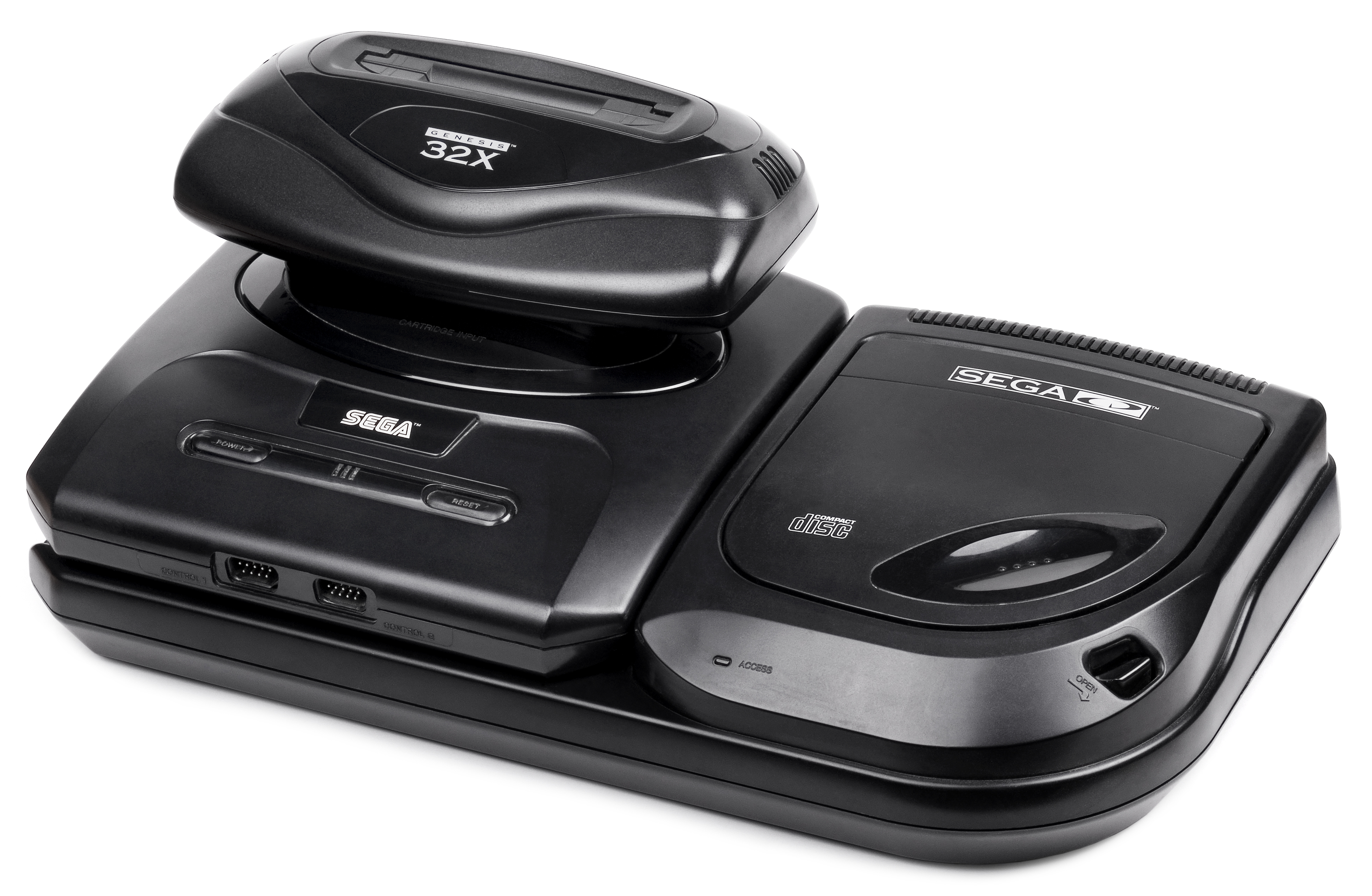
Paprium unlocks additional features when the Mega CD and/or 32X are plugged in.

Paprium begins with three playable characters, Tug, Alex, and Dice, each with their own strength and speed, with a handful of other playable characters that the player can unlock with game progression. The game follows the three characters in Paprium, a fictional supercity built after a massive nuclear war located "somewhere at equidistant point [sic] between Shanghai, Tokyo and Pyongyang" in the year 8A2 (hexadecimal value for the year 2210). The game supports both the Mega-CD and the 32X accessories: when the accessories are plugged in to a Mega Drive, it will insert boxes of the accessories in game which functions as a throwable explosive weapon for players. In addition to this, the Mega-CD's additional CPU hardware can be leveraged as a computer controlled second player in single-player games.

The player will move through various stages battling various enemy characters to advance to the final boss stage for each level. Certain stages have branching paths which allow the player to pick and choose which way they want to progress in the level. Killing enemies will add to the player's score which will help unlock additional lives or powerups. One unique feature in Paprium is unlike other beat 'em up games, Paprium's score is recorded in the hexadecimal or base-16 numerical system rather than the conventional decimal or base-10 system. This isn't limited to score in the game, as other numbers in the game such as the aforementioned year and player character's age is all recorded in hexadecimal. A mechanic in the game is the characters can form an addiction to BLU, a drug that can be picked up in the level and grant a small amount of invulnerability on use. Characters can become addicted to the drug, and this will eat away at the character's life bar. If the player's lifebar falls into the "addiction" portions the playable character will enter drug withdrawal and be weaker and slower. Players will have the option to pick up various weapons or use various vehicles in certain stages to make fights easier.

== Development ==
WaterMelon announced a new game on their Magical Game Factory website, a site set up as both a storefront and crowd-funding page for WaterMelon and future games, as Project Y, the then code name of Paprium, which was announced would be a new Mega Drive game on February 21, 2012, which would be developed alongside WaterMelon's first ever Super NES title, code-named Project N, which is still in development. Funding and influence on Project Y was funded by "gems", a digital currency used by WaterMelon for this site where funders would convert actual currency to WaterMelon for these gems in order to vote for what direction they wanted the game to take. Each gem would cost roughly €0.10 (around USD$0.13 at announcement date) and would be used individually as votes, allowing funders to buy more gems to fund ideas they wanted more than others. Throughout the early development phase for Project Y, WaterMelon put up calls to funders to invest their gems to influence what game platform they wanted WaterMelon to develop Project Y for, what genre or genres they wanted Project Y to be, and the game's art direction.

On March 4, 2012, WaterMelon announced that from the results of an investor poll, Project Y would be a beat 'em up with role-playing game elements, and the results of another poll from March 29, 2012, determined the game would be set in a cyberpunk setting. Development for Project Y began sometime around September 2012 alongside Pier Solar's HD re-release, with an initial release date for summer 2013. The game originally was planned to be at least 40 Megabits in size, but through the development cycle it was increased to 64 Megabits in size.

WaterMelon put a call out to hire additional artists for Project Y in July 2013, pointing out familiarity with Final Fight, Streets of Rage 3 and The King of Fighters as the requirements for the position. Tulio Goncalves later mentioned this in an interview with Retro Gamer that these were the main sources of inspiration for artwork and gameplay for the game. Luis Martins eventually was brought on as the artist responsible for the character designs of Paprium as a result of this open position. Due to the late hire of an artist for the game and confusion around when the game would be released, the release date was quietly moved to March 25, 2014, with other WaterMelon employees later stating that this initial Summer 2013 release date was "fake". The game would be pushed to an undetermined 2014 release date on March 26, 2014, when the original March 25th date was missed.

Internal conflicts at WaterMelon started occurring during the studio's Pier Solar HD development and the beginning of Project Y's development cycles, culminating with Godde moving back to France and beginning to compartmentalize Project Y development to just himself, going as far as keeping including cartridge manufacturing information and game direction information hidden and known only to him, including keeping information from WaterMelon's co-founder Tulio Goncalves. Goncalves left the company after Pier Solar HD's release at the end of 2014, due to conflicts with Godde. Another setback in development occurred in August 2016 when Godde claimed that Project Y's developer's kit was lost by Air France, causing WaterMelon to have to replace it at a large cost to the company; however, this has been disputed by a Sega-16 forum member, who was in contact with Godde and Air France. They claimed that, in their interactions with the airline, no one there was aware of any lost package reported to them or discovered by their flight crews.

WaterMelon announced that Project Y's official name would be Paprium in a March 17, 2017, post on their Facebook page, along with a late 2017 release date, later confirmed to be September 17, 2017. Another setback occurred during development leading up to the release of the game when PayPal shut down WaterMelon's accounts and froze funds that WaterMelon had stored in PayPal. Godde, writing on the Magical Game Factory blog, then announced that the game would then be pushed back from a September 2017 release to an early 2018 release.

In a March 27, 2018 post, WaterMelon stated that they had run in to a production issue with the DATENMEISTER chipset and this was holding up production on the game as chipset modifications were needed to continue manufacturing. On October 27, 2018, WaterMelon held a small party in Paris to celebrate 30 years of the Sega Mega Drive, as well as publicly unveil a working copy of Paprium. This was the first time Paprium in any form was displayed to the public and not a member of WaterMelon's development team. The party was criticized by both attendees and those who watched recorded footage of the gameplay as the game appeared to be unfinished with enemies being non-existent, stages appearing to be empty, and the game crashing several times during the demo. Godde defended the party and game display claiming that Paprium was finished, but they intentionally displayed a prototype to keep the final release of the game a surprise for new players. Godde later stated in a 2020 interview that the released version of the game was completed in 2017, along with stating that this was the version that was shown at the party, despite the various issues displayed when playing the game to the party-goers.

Martens had confirmed that Paprium is still under manufacturing and the game was going to be planned for an end of 2019 release, after previously making a public statement calling out WaterMelon for lack of transparency regarding release and manufacturing news. Godde released an update on the WaterMelon Facebook page on May 28, 2019, along with a video of a factory worker assembling the Grand Stick III. In this update, one of the last public updates from WaterMelon prior to the game's release, continued the ongoing allusion to financial issues related to the Paprium release, along with the mention that only pre-ordered copies would be assembled, with no further stock being assembled.

=== Soundtrack ===
The Paprium soundtrack was composed by David Burton aka Groovemaster303 and Trevin Hughes aka Jredd. Tulio Goncalves originally reached out to Burton for Paprium because of his prior work on Pier Solar, and his work on the Streets of Rage Remake fan-game. and was approached by WaterMelon for the soundtrack for what then was known as Project Y. Burton approached Hughes for a collaboration as the two had worked together in the past on other projects. The soundtrack takes advantage of the Mega Drive's native Yamaha YM2612 sound chip as well as utilizing the Zilog Z80 included in the Mega Drive for Master System backwards compatibility, along with the extra hardware included in the Paprium's DATENMEISTER chipset for additional audio capabilities like increased audio channels and samples. The soundtrack was completed sometime in 2013, with minor changes and tweaks to the tracks occurring during the development lifecycle.

Hughes has mentioned that games like the Streets of Rage series as well as the Mega Drive's Terminator game, along with works by Yuzo Koshiro and Tim Follin, were used as inspiration for Paprium's soundtrack and sound design.

=== Cartridge hardware ===
The Paprium cartridge hardware is unique among both commercially released Mega Drive games as well as homebrew releases. The cartridge contains a custom chipset named "DATENMEISTER" or referred to by WaterMelon as the "DT128M16VA1LT" chipset. This is not the first time a Mega Drive game has been released with additional hardware to improve the console hardware's graphical ability, with the Sega Virtua Processor (SVP) chipset created for the Mega Drive release of Virtua Racing being the first; but this is the first time a homebrew release cartridge has been released with its own custom chipset. This chipset is under a metal heat sink on the cartridge printed circuit board (PCB); however, initial shipments of the cartridge had reports that the heat sink was improperly secured onto the PCB, with WaterMelon releasing a statement in the game's online support page that users should open up their cartridge case and remove the heat sink to not damage the PCB, as the heat sink is purely for aesthetics and not needed for function. Users that have removed the heatsink found epoxy covering the DATENMEISTER chipset, put there by WaterMelon to prevent chipset reverse engineering. Removing the epoxy reveals several additional chips such as an Altera FPGA (10M02SCU169C8G), a STMicroelectronics microcontroller (STM32F446ZEJ6), a Spansion microcontroller (GL064N90FFIS2), an ISSI semiconductor RAM (IS42S16100H), and two logic gates from ON Semiconductor (74LCX245 and 74LCX257), which is used to handle the additional audio channels and capability, and to assist the console in various game tasks (managing VRAM, generating sprite table...). The cartridge uses flash memory for save data, and does not need to rely on a password save feature or rely on battery saves like many Mega Drive games that came out during the console's release lifespan. The cartridge also features a phone connector on the top of the cartridge dubbed the "MegaWire 4" in marketing materials. While functionality does not exist for this yet, it has been mentioned by WaterMelon that this will be used as an expansion port for future downloadable content along with an online high-score board or possibly for compatibility updates. The cartridge features 64 Megabits of storage (8 Megabytes) making it one of the largest Mega Drive cartridges ever commercially released, alongside Pier Solar, which was also 64 Megabits.

=== Grand Stick III ===
WaterMelon developed an arcade stick alongside of Paprium called the "Grand Stick III". This arcade stick works on both the Mega Drive and PC, and features an arcade quality joystick and eight buttons, mimicking that of a Mega Drive 6 button controller (A, B, C, X, Y, Z, Start, and Mode). When the stick is hooked up to the Mega Drive and used for Paprium, the stick will illuminate the A button to let the player know when the BLU pill is available for use, along with sound effects from a built in speaker when the player character is knocked down.

The Grand Stick III connects to the Mega Drive via the DE-9 controller port, or to a PC via the device's USB-B plug. The Grand Stick III also has an additional DB-9 controller port which when paired with an additional Grand Stick III and two Mega Drive controllers can allow up to four players in Paprium's unlockable Arena mode. The stick has a set of DIP switches on the bottom of the device, which can be used to change the button layout, unlock certain modes in the Paprium game, or enter debug mode.

== Release ==
Paprium was eventually confirmed to be complete and released on December 16, 2020, for the Sega Mega Drive after several delays and was released in multiple editions. The game is available in a "Classic" edition, which comes in a plastic clamshell box with artwork similar to early Mega Drive titles, and a "Limited" edition with artwork similar to later era Japanese Mega Drive, European Mega Drive and North American Genesis releases. Despite the regional branding, each Paprium cartridge is region-free and was made to work natively on both PAL and NTSC televisions. If the game is run on a Japanese Mega Drive, a number of small differences between the Japanese cartridge and North American/European releases have been identified by players post release, such as music tracks appearing in game along with the title screen adding "メガロポリス" (katakana for megalopolis) where other copies display the Datenmeister logo. A limited "Investor"'s edition was sent to early backers of the project and contains a pink cartridge, along with a leather thong, a map of the game, and a handwritten postcard from Godde.

After release, it was discovered by owners of the Paprium cartridge that the game starts off with a troll game called "PAAAAA" on first boot, which is an unbeatable demake of the game which will only appear on first boot, and never appear on subsequent boots. This move was widely criticized with reports that the game does not boot on certain hardware like Analogue's field-programmable gate array (FPGA) based Mega Sg, clone consoles, or even Sega released revisions of the Sega Mega Drive. This was acknowledged by WaterMelon directly stating that they only designed the game for Sega produced hardware. Initial workarounds were discovered that allowed Paprium to boot on the Mega Sg, with Analogue eventually releasing an official firmware update that allows the cart to work on the Mega Sg natively. Other users have found on certain revisions of the Sega Mega Drive require a 32X to be plugged in to boot, despite Paprium not being a 32X game or taking advantage of the 32X's additional hardware. This was also confirmed by Godde directly, mentioning that early versions of the Model 1 Mega Drive require the 32X to function.

On February 17, 2021, WaterMelon announced all copies of Paprium have been sold out, with a post-release announcement planned for February 22. On February 22 WaterMelon announced that they are still shipping games; however, they would begin sale of their intellectual property, including Pier Solar and Paprium, along with their unreleased games.

WaterMelon announced on October 22, 2021, that a new Kickstarter campaign for Paprium is launching to fund the development of ports to the PlayStation 4, PlayStation 5, and Steam, which was extended out to Dreamcast, Nintendo Switch, and a port to the Game Gear, with funding goals being reached at a later date. While this campaign launched with a new version of their arcade stick, the Grand Stick IV and an ability to purchase additional cartridges for the Mega Drive game, many original backers are still reporting not having received their copy of the game.

== Reception ==
Reception

Review scores
Publication	Score
HobbyConsolas	89/100
Air-Gaming	8/10

Paprium received positive reception from reviewers. HobbyConsolas's Daniel Quesada gave the game an 89/100, praising the game's hardware push to get the most out of the Mega Drive along with calling it a great successor to beat 'em ups of the 16-bit era, but criticized the game's $130 price tag and uneven difficulty. Romain Gambier of Past Game Rebirth gave the game and Grand Stick III a positive review, citing the game's length and diverting paths as innovative. Writing for Air-Gaming, Julien Boisseau gave the game an 8/10, praising the graphics and sound, but also left criticism against the $130 price tag. Sega-16's Sebastian Sponsel gave the game a 7/10 praising the hardware and huge graphical improvements put forward by WaterMelon, but ultimately felt that "these are all just neat dressing that in the long run don't serve to cover up the flaws inherent in the core design".

In July 2025, the 2021 ROM dump which was previously unplayable was made fully playable with a release of a modified Genesis Plus GX core for RetroArch. The PCM audio is not emulated as of yet and there are still some audio issues. Instead, the core plays the music from MP3s included with the ROM dump.

Work is in progress to get the ROM dump running on a real Mega Drive / Genesis console via a Mega EverDrive Pro utilising a custom mapper and WAV files for the music.
