= Ar Nosurge =

2014 video game

Ar nosurge: Ode to an Unborn Star
- European PlayStation 3 cover art
- Developer: Gust
- Publisher: Koei Tecmo
- Director: Akira Tsuchiya
- Platforms: PlayStation 3; PlayStation Vita; Nintendo Switch; Microsoft Windows; PlayStation 4
- Release: PlayStation 3: JP: 6 March 2014; EU: 26 September 2014; NA: 23 September 2014; PlayStation Vita: JP: 2 October 2014; EU: 1 July 2015; NA: 2 July 2015; Switch, Windows, PS4: JP: 4 March 2021
- Genre: Role-playing
- Mode: Single-player

Ar nosurge: Ode to an Unborn Star (Note: Full name Surge Concerto: Ar nosurge ~A Song that Prays for a Planet Being Born~ (アルノサージュ ～生まれいずる星へ祈る詩～, Arunosaaju ~Umareizuru Hoshi e Inoru Uta~)) is a Japanese role-playing video game developed by Gust and published by Koei Tecmo. Directed by Akira Tsuchiya, the game takes the anime art style of Gust's flagship Atelier video game series and puts it into a science fiction space opera-type setting. While playing as an RPG, the game is very story heavy, with virtually all gameplay mechanics feeding into the overall plot, including many segments playing as an interactive visual novel. Designed with player immersion as a core concept, the player actually plays as themselves, using their video game console as a means to communicate with characters as themselves, while otherwise controlling characters as one typically does in a video game. The game alternates between following two sets of characters - Delta and Casty, and Earthes and Ion, as they work through issues related to the hostile race known as Sharl that are antagonizing the space station that humanity currently lives on, while working through many of their own personal issues of their past.

The game debuted with a worldwide release on the PlayStation 3 across in 2014. An extended version containing all of the game's downloadable content (DLC), Ar nosurge Plus, was released worldwide the following year on the PlayStation Vita. A remastered high definition version, Ar nosurge DX, was released in Japan in March 2021 for the Nintendo Switch, PlayStation 4 and Microsoft Windows.

== Gameplay ==
The game plays as a JRPG with visual novel segments. On the role-playing side, the game does not have a traditional party setup, but rather, the game alternates between two sets of characters; Delta and Cass on one side, and Ion and Earthes on the other. In the regular game field, the game plays as most JRPGs do; the player maneuver's the character through the game environment, exploring small areas to find non-player characters to interact with or items to collect to aid them through progressing the game. In certain areas, a bar is present in the corner of the screen. The bar indicates that random battles may occur in that area, and indicate how increasingly likely they are to occur as movement transpires on the map. Optional small talk between characters arises as the game world is explored as well.

The game employs a turn based battle system with timed button press elements that amplify effectiveness. Only two characters participate in a battle at the time - Delta or Earthes as the attacker/defender, and Cass or Ion who stands back to charge their "Song Magic" special move. Multiple waves of enemies approach the player, which the player takes on each wave one at a time as each is defeated, with each wave placing characters on a 3x3 grid. The player has a selection of different types of regular attacks, with varying strengths, weaknesses, and area of effects, as well as the option of using consumable items or special "Friend Skills" earned through game progression that award various effects. The better the player strings together attacks, the faster the Song Magic's meter grows, which increases its attack power. Attacks phases can be extended if enemies are hit with a "break" status incurred by good fighting, though attack number are finite, and once they are used up, the attack phase ends. The battle transitions to the enemy phase, where the player must defends through time button presses to reduce damage aimed at Cass or Ion. Battles continue until one of four scenarios occur - the player defeats all enemies, the enemies deplete all health points of the Cass or Ion, both sides run out of turns, or if the player chooses to use the Song Magic attack. The more the Song Magic is charged, the more powerful it is, and the more it works towards eliminating random battles from the area. If the Song Magic meter is maxed out, the battle is automatically won, and random battles are eliminated from the area for the duration of the time spent there.

The rest of the game's gameplay modes more closely resemble a visual novel, largely revolving around reading text and choosing from dialogue trees or other text-based options. The "Genometrics" segments are story segments where the player dives into a character's subconscious dream world to help them through various mental hang-ups they're suffering through in the game. The segments are split into 10-20 points on a map to be selected; each one revealing more of the narrative. Selecting each one costs Dive Points (DP), which are earned through participating in the game's battle system. Certain dialogue options cost DP as well, and may hinder or help progression. If the player cannot pay the given cost of DP required, progress is halted, and the player returns to the main game. The segment is completed once enough DP is spent to read all text to the story's conclusion, and completion rewards the player with new "Song Magic" to be used in the game's battle system. The game's "Purification" segments involve two characters meditating and reflecting together on various events that had transpired in the main game. The player is also given the option to equip "Genometrica Crystals" that are obtained through progression of the Genometrics segments, which give stat boosts for the game's battle system. The game also contains an item synthesis system similar to the Atelier video game series. Upon traveling to item shops, and talking to their respective shop keeper synthesis recipes are obtained. If the player has obtained the required items through game progression, they may combine them into new items. Each item creation contains a story scene about the respective item, and can be used in further synthesizing, or for added effects in battle.

== Synopsis ==
=== Setting and characters ===
The bulk of the game takes place on a massive space station traveling through space. Humanity has been traveling through space on it for the last 5,000 years following the destruction of their home planet, Ra Ciela, which was destroyed by its own sun. Morale is generally low for its inhabitants – they long to live on in nature again, the ship is running out of resources, and they've been unable to find a new planet to sustain them. Additionally, they're under attack by a fairy-like race of humanoids called Sharls, who, with their innocent appearances and power of "Song Magic", lure people away to abduct them. Humanity is generally powerless against them, and must resort to sectioning off parts of the space station and hiding, and their numbers diminish. However, after thousands of years have passed, the impassable "Fellion Wall" falls, and in are people called "ancients" - people essentially cryogenically frozen from the era when humanity still lived on Ra Ciela. It appears human from this era once also possessed the ability to create "Song Magic", and thus, these people allow for the ability to fight back against the Sharl. Alternatively, there's another cult-like faction of people who believe in giving up and disappearing away with the Sharl, complicating matters.

The game follows the events of two separate pairs of main characters. Delta, an elite fighter from the organization of PLASMA, travels with his childhood friend Cass, who has the ability to wield song magic. Both are Ancients from the city of Felion. The other pair is Ion, also able to wield rare Song Magic, and Earthes, a humanoid robot of unknown origins. Earthes is similar to a silent protagonist in the game: he is a vessel of which the player is supposed to be communicating directly into the game world, with game characters directly addressing the player, breaking the fourth wall. Other prominent characters include Nay, a friend of the four who holds a leadership role called the "Divine Empress", Kanon, a rival-turned-friend of Ion's past, Zill a church bishop who advocates working with the Sharl, Sarly a scientist friend of Delta and Cass, and Shirotaka, an otaku computer hacker friend of the groups.

== Development ==
Ar Nosurge was first announced in September 2013, as part of developer Gust's 20th anniversary plans. The game was directed by Akira Tsuchiya, who had previously directed Gust's Ar Tonelico trilogy of video games, and Ciel Nosurge. The games, along with Ar Nosurge, are all part of Gust's extended "Exa Pico" fictional universe. The events of the Ar Tonelico trilogy connect to each other, but largely just occur in the same fictional universe rather than directly overlapping into Ar Nosurge. Ciel Nosurge, however, is considered a prequel to Ar Nosurge, and contains many common characters and settings, with the two often referred to collectively as the Surge Concerto duology. Despite this, Tsuchiya created Ar Nosurge to be an entirely self-contained story that requires no knowledge of the other game's to understand the game's story. The game was meant to mix the anime style of Gust's other main franchise, Atelier, while added a more in-depth science fiction story element to it. The game's key concept was to create a game world that felt like an "actual existing world", where the player is playing a role in the story as themselves, using the video game console to communicate as themselves to the characters in the game. Exploring realistic and in-depth bonds between characters was a main focus for the development team as well. Some story events, such as the "Purification Ceremony" scenes, feature sexual overtones and innuendo; Tsuchiya implemented this to create more realistic interactions and relationships between characters. The game's battle system was developed to be flashy in presentation to hold the player's attention, but simple and quick in execution, as to keep the focus on the story and characters. All aspects of the gameplay were built to feed into the game's story, in order to create a better sense of immersion. Not all ideas related to creating a sense of immersion were included in the final game; at one point, the game contained enemy characters in battles that could "notice" the presence of the player, and would try to do things to "harm" the player, such as deleting their save game information. However, this was deemed too detrimental to the enjoyment of the game, and was removed prior any of the game's releases.

=== Release and versions ===
Ar Nosurge first released on the PlayStation 3 in Japan on March 6, 2014, slightly delayed from its initial January 2014 release date. The PS3 version was announced for an English localization shortly afterwards. While the game was commonly spelled Ar No Surge prior to localization, its final English title would be Ar Nosurge: Ode to an Unborn Star. It was released in North America on September 23, 2014, and in Europe on September 26, 2014. North American publisher NIS America released a limited edition on their online store that included a copy of the game, the soundtrack, a hardcover art book, and a poster. Some retailers bundled some of the game's Downloadable content (DLC) as a pre-order bonus as well. A number of sets of DLC was released for the PlayStation 3 version, including additional sets of "Purification" scene scenarios for the characters Kanon and Nay, two new "Genometrics" scenarios for the character Shirotaka, and some cosmetic character costumes. The game's soundtrack and two mini-albums with all of the game's vocal tracks released in the same month, while a prequel manga was released in promotion of the game the month prior in Monthly Shōnen Sirius.

An enhanced port of the game, Ar Nosurge Plus was released for the PlayStation Vita shortly after. This release contained all of the original's DLC, additional cosmetic character costumes, and a new expanded tutorial. It was released on October 2, 2014, in Japan, and July 2015 in North America and Europe. After an extended lack of developments related to the game, in 2019, Gust and Tsuchiya announced that they planned on doing more with the game in the future. Another enhanced release, Ar Nosurge DX, was announced in 2020 for the Nintendo Switch, PlayStation 4, and Microsoft Windows platforms. Initially announced for a January 2021 release date, it received a small delay to March 4, 2021, for Japan to address some minor quality issues. Three separate limited editions were released in Japan, including one that costs over $1,000 due to the extra art and music related items included. No mention has been made on the possibility of a worldwide release of this remaster of the game.

== Reception ==
Reception

Aggregate score
Aggregator	Score
Metacritic	PS3: 67/100; Vita: 77/100

The game was generally well received by critics. Critics generally praised the game's story, albeit with the notion that it could be confusing and overwhelming at first. Hardcore Gamer praised the game's emphasis on story over common JRPG concepts like grinding, stating that although the story and scope may be overwhelming at first, that "once the stories start to intertwine, and a few startling revelations come to light, the script doesn't seem quite as bonkers. Characters you'll grow to love change alongside your own, and a multitude of communicative sources...make it easy to become invested...while it doesn't break the glass ceiling of video game narrative design, it certainly leaves its hand prints across the stretch." Similarly, RPGSite said that the Plus version of the game "remains one of the better modern entries in the genre. Players will uncover some brilliant character relationships and outstanding music that will remain with you long after the credits have rolled." Famitsu gave the game a review score of 32/40.

The PlayStation 3 version of Ar nosurge sold 27,037 physical retail copies within the first week of release in Japan, placing fifth within the Japanese software sales rankings for that particular week. The Vita release of the Plus version sold another 9,240 units at retail in Japan later in the year as well, placing ninth for the week. While no exact Western sales figures were released, Sony revealed that Plus was the eighth most downloaded game for the Vita in North America in its release month of July 2015, which encompasses all sales of the title, as it did not receive a physical retail release outside of Japan.

== See also ==
- Chronos Materia - a new IP proposed by Gust in 2013 that would have shared elements of the Ar Nosurge and Atelier series that was cancelled in 2016
- Baten Kaitos - a 2004 JRPG by Monolith Soft that shared a similar fourth wall breaking premise of the player having a direct role in the game
