= 99 Bricks Wizard Academy =

2014 puzzle video game

- Developer: WeirdBeard
- Platforms: iOS, Android
- Release: February 18, 2014
- Genre: Puzzle
- Mode: Single-player

99 Bricks Wizard Academy is a puzzle video game for iOS and Android. It was developed by independent Dutch studio WeirdBeard B.V. and released on February 18, 2014. Players move falling blocks into place to build a tower. The game received generally positive reception, with reviewers comparing the game to Tetris.

== Gameplay ==
99 Bricks Wizard Academy is a puzzle game where the player is trying to build a tower. Gameplay revolves around differently shaped blocks falling from above. The player can move and rotate the blocks while they are falling. These blocks are affected by gravity, and can fall over if placed poorly. Once the player loses three or more blocks in this way, a "tower top" block falls down, finishing the tower. The player can also use spells once they fill up their mana, which help them build a stable tower.

After a tower is finished, the player earns coins. They can be used in the game's shop to buy new spells and outfits. The game also features an achievement system, requiring players to reach certain objectives to unlock new tower types.

== Reception ==
The game has a Metacritic rating of 86% based on 6 critic reviews. 148Apps wrote "This puzzle game combines Tetris with physics, magic, and a healthy dose of charm." Gamer.nl said "99 Bricks: Wizard Academy is sympathetic, addicting and challenging. New challenges introduced at the right times intelligently show how much depth the simple ‘build-a-tower-Tetris-game’ can have." TouchArcade said "I think it's something anyone who likes Tetris can appreciate, and that's just about everyone there is, right?" IGN Italia wrote "A very nice and extremely fun variation on the Tetris model." Pocket Gamer UK said "Don't let its visual similarity to Tetris fool you. This is a game that stands on its own very high merits." AppSpy said "99 Bricks Wizard Academy is a jolly physics construction game that proves while we may have problems, 99 Bricks ain’t one."

== Legacy ==
In 2015, WeirdBeardGames announced a follow-up title, Tricky Towers, releasing in August 2016 for PlayStation 4 and PC.
