= PachiPara =

Japanese video game series

PachiPara or Pachinko Paradise is a series of Japanese pachinko simulator video games published by Irem. Currently consisting of 17 titles, the series mainly serves as a video game adaptation of the Umi Monogatari (うみものがたり; lit. Sea Story) series of pachinko machines produced by Sanyo; the same series was also adapted into a manga and anime series in 2009.

Early entries in the series were released under the name Sanyo Pachinko Paradise and were simple pachinko simulators with the occasional appearance of a story mode. From the 8th entry onward, the range of content was significantly expanded through the Pachipro Chronicles (パチプロ風雲録) game mode.

Several games in the series were designed by Kazuma Kujo, an Irem developer known for his work on the Disaster Report series.

At least one game in the series, Pachipara Portable Sakura for the PlayStation Portable, was cancelled due to a low level of quality.

== Releases ==
Title	Platform	Release date	PlayStation Store release date	Chart position
Sanyo Pachinko Paradise (三洋パチンコパラダイス)	PlayStation	July 29, 1999	October 10, 2007	
Sanyo Pachinko Paradise 2 ~Sea Story Special~ (三洋パチンコパラダイス2 〜海物語スペシャル〜)	PlayStation	November 18, 1999	October 10, 2007	
Sanyo Pachinko Paradise 3 ~Wanwan Parade~ (三洋パチンコパラダイス3 〜わんわん大行進〜)	PlayStation	March 9, 2000	November 14, 2007	
Sanyo Pachinko Paradise 4 ~Sushi Restaurant Gen-san~ (三洋パチンコパラダイス4 〜寿司屋だ源さん〜)	PlayStation	October 12, 2000	November 14, 2007	
Sanyo Pachinko Paradise 5 ~Ukiuki Fishing Flag~ (三洋パチンコパラダイス5 〜ウキウキ大漁旗〜)	PlayStation	May 10, 2001	August 30, 2007	
Wanwan Sea Story ~Sanyo Pachinko Paradise DX~ (新装開店!!わんわん海物語 〜三洋パチンコパラダイスDX〜)	PlayStation	October 25, 2001	August 30, 2007	
Sanyo Pachinko Paradise 6 ~Ginpani Great Aquarium~ (三洋パチンコパラダイス6 〜ギンパニ大水族館〜)	PlayStation 2	June 28, 2001		
Sanyo Pachinko Paradise 7 ~Edo-period Gen-san~ (三洋パチンコパラダイス7 〜江戸っ子源さん〜)	PlayStation 2	June 27, 2002		
Sanyo Pachinko Paradise 8 ~New Sea Story~ (三洋パチンコパラダイス8 〜新海物語〜)	PlayStation 2	March 27, 2003		
Sanyo Pachinko Paradise 9 ~Shinkai Encore!~ (三洋パチンコパラダイス9 〜新海おかわりっ!〜)	PlayStation 2	November 6, 2003		
Sanyo Pachinko Paradise 10 ~Gen-san Encore!~ (三洋パチンコパラダイス10 〜源さん おかえりっ!〜)	PlayStation 2	May 27, 2004		
Sanyo Pachinko Paradise 11 ~Shinkai and the Silver Wolf~ (三洋パチンコパラダイス11 〜新海とさらば銀玉の狼〜)	PlayStation 2	February 24, 2005		
PachiPara 12 ~Memories of Sea and Summer~ (三洋パチンコパラダイス12 〜大海と夏の思い出〜)	PlayStation 2	December 15, 2005		
PachiPara 13 ~Super Sea and the Pachipro Chronicles~ (三洋パチンコパラダイス13 〜スーパー海とパチプロ風雲録〜)	PlayStation 2	October 26, 2006		
PachiPara 14 ~Wind, Clouds and Super Sea in Okinawa~ (パチパラ14 〜風と雲とスーパー海 IN 沖縄〜)	PlayStation 2	July 26, 2007		5
PachiPara DL Hyper Sea Story in the Caribbean (パチパラDL ハイパー海 IN カリブ)	PlayStation 3	July 2, 2008		
PachiPara 15 ~Super Sea in Okinawa 2~ (パチパラ15 〜スーパー海 IN 沖縄2〜)	PlayStation 3	March 25, 2010		
PachiPara 16 ~Gingira Paradise 2~ (パチパラ16 〜ギンギラパラダイス2〜)	PlayStation 3	November 25, 2010		
PachiPara 17 ~CR Shinkai Story with Agnes Lum~ (パチパラ17 〜CR新海物語 With アグネス・ラム〜)	PlayStation 3	February 24, 2011		
PachiPara SLOT ~Pachislot Super Sea Story in Okinawa~ (パチパラSLOT 〜パチスロスーパー海物語 IN 沖縄〜)	PlayStation Portable	May 26, 2011		
PachiPara SLOT+ Pachislot Carpenter Gen-san ~Let's go! Flame Gen Festival Edition~ (パチパラSLOT+ パチスロ大工の源さん〜いくぜっ!炎の源祭編〜)	PlayStation Portable	January 24, 2013		
PachiPara 3D Premium Sea Story ~Dreaming Maiden and the Pachinko King Championship~ (パチパラ3D プレミアム海物語 〜夢見る乙女とパチンコ王決定戦〜)	Nintendo 3DS	November 24, 2011	N/A	
PachiPara 3D Great Sea Story 2 ~Pachipro Chronicles Hana Hope and Betrayal School Life~ (パチパラ3D 大海物語2 〜パチプロ風雲録・花 希望と裏切りの学園生活〜)	Nintendo 3DS	May 17, 2012	N/A	
PachiPara 3D Great Sea Story 2 with Agnes Lum ~Pachipro Chronicles Hana Erased License~ (パチパラ3D 大海物語2 With アグネス・ラム 〜パチプロ風雲録・花 消されたライセンス〜)	Nintendo 3DS	September 6, 2012	N/A	
Pachipara 3D Deluxe Sea Story ~Pachipro Chronicles Hana: The Conquerors of the Isolated Island~ (パチパラ3D デラックス海物語 〜パチプロ風雲録・花 孤島の勝負師たち〜)	Nintendo 3DS	February 7, 2013	N/A	
CR Wanwan Paradise (CRわんわんパラダイス)	Windows 98, Windows 95	October 25, 2001	N/A	
CR Sushi Chef (CR寿司屋の大将)	Windows ME, Windows 98, Windows 95	October 25, 2001	N/A	
CR Sea Story (CR海物語)	Windows XP, Windows ME, Windows 98, Windows 95	2002	N/A	
Wanwan Sea Story ~PachiPara PC DX~ (わんわん海物語 〜パチパラPC DX〜)	Windows XP, Windows ME, Windows 98, Windows 95	February 27, 2002	N/A	
