= Pier Solar and the Great Architects =

2010 video game

- Developer: WaterMelon
- Publisher: WaterMelon
- Designers: Tulio Adriano; Gwénaël Godde
- Artist: Armen Mardirossian
- Composers: Zable Fahr; Tulio Adriano; Tiido Priimägi
- Platforms: Dreamcast; Genesis; Linux; OS X Ouya; PlayStation 3 PlayStation 4 Windows; Wii U Xbox One
- Release: Sega Genesis: WW: December 20, 2010; PS3, PS4, Windows, OS X, Linux, Ouya: NA: September 30, 2014; EU: November 12, 2014; Wii U: NA: November 6, 2014; EU: November 27, 2014; Xbox One: WW: November 21, 2014; Dreamcast: WW: October 25, 2015
- Genre: Role-playing
- Mode: Single-player

Pier Solar and the Great Architects is an indie role-playing video game developed and published by WaterMelon for the Sega Mega Drive. The game was released worldwide on December 20, 2010. The game optionally utilizes the Mega CD expansion device to enhance its audio capabilities.

== Plot ==
=== Setting ===
The story is focused around three best friends — Hoston, Alina and Edessot. Hoston's father falls ill and the three friends are left to seek a rare magic herb to cure him. This story later develops into a much larger plot surrounding Pier Solar and the Great Architects.

=== Characters ===
- Hoston is a young botanist, taught by his father. He is a carefree laid-back young man. When his father becomes dangerously ill, Hoston realises that he is the only person who can save him and heads for the forbidden caverns of Reja where he hopes to find the herbs that will save his father's life.
- Alina was adopted at a young age. She grew up with Hoston and Edessot as her only friends and is desperately trying to get her father to approve of her. Even though she is superficially strong and responsible, she turns out to be lonely at heart, because she feels that Hoston and Edessot are the only people who truly care about her. She is protective of them and in many ways considers them to be her real family, though neither Hoston nor Edessot understand this.
- Edessot is a mechanics genius and mature beyond his years. He is part of a wealthy and liberally-minded family, and has been free to explore the world to his heart's content. Usually happier alone and tinkering with machines, he still likes spending time with Hoston and Alina, having formed a particularly strong bond with the latter.

== Development and release ==
Cover for Sega Dreamcast release (2015). This cover is styled just like a retail PAL Dreamcast game. Artwork by Armen M.

Development of the game began on June 8, 2004 as a small project by the community of the website Eidolon's Inn, a community dedicated to homebrew-development for Sega video game consoles. The project was originally intended to be a simple RPG based on the members of the community, and the target platform was the Mega CD. At that time the project was simply called Tavern RPG, a reference to the website's message boards being called "The Tavern".

As development progressed the original idea was abandoned in favor of a full-fledged fantasy RPG of greater scale. By 2006 the game engine had become sophisticated enough that the creation of actual content could really begin. While most of the Eidolon's Inn community was no longer directly involved, other people joined the team, leading to a core of eight members with additional help from many more.

Goals for the game became ever more ambitious, with the development being switched from the Mega-CD, for which CD-ROMs would have been inexpensive to produce, to the Sega Mega Drive, a system using more expensive cartridge-based storage media. To allow for the transition without having to reduce the amount of game content, it was decided to use a cartridge with 64 megabits of memory, making it technically the "biggest" game cartridge for the system, while finding a way to utilize the superior sound hardware of the Mega-CD at the same time if the device was present.

The game was announced in a developer's blog with the launch of a website shortly after revealing the game's final title in January 2008. A demo was released later the same year to play on emulators, with pre-orders starting at the same time. A release at Christmas 2008 was announced. The game got considerable media attention for a homebrew title during the following months, with the UK magazine Retro Gamer featuring a two-page article in issue 49 and numerous websites reporting on it.

However this release date was not met, the developers citing the departure of a team member who had contributed essential graphics to the game, and his wish not to have his work used in the final version as the main reason. The delay was announced on November 14, 2008, but no new release date was given. Still media attention remained steady, with Germany's longest running print video game magazine M! Games and UK magazine GamesTM reporting.

The game was shipped in December 2010, two years after the originally intended release date. Three different versions of the game have been released: Classic, Posterity and Reprint. The Classic and Posterity editions each have three different language packs, while the Reprint features the three most common European languages: English, French and German. The Japanese language pack originally included Japanese and English languages but the Japanese language was dropped and French and Spanish included due to a lack of volunteers to proofread the Japanese translation.

Even prior to the game's official release date, the game had already sold out through pre-orders. Due to overwhelming demand, WaterMelon decided to produce a second, also limited, run with a so-called "Reprint Edition", which sold out in 12 days. WaterMelon announced the production of additional copies on Thursday, September 15, 2011. The third and final forecast re-print of the Mega Drive/Genesis cartridge was due to be released on March 25, 2014. It had yet to happen, but Watermelon has assured fans they will be ready for late April/early May. However, this release date was not met either. This reprint edition finally started shipping to customers in late February 2015.

On February 22, 2021 WaterMelon announced they would begin sale of their intellectual property, including Pier Solar and Paprium, along with unreleased games and their hardware.

=== Pier Solar HD ===
On November 5, 2012, the game's developer WaterMelon announced on its Kickstarter page that it was developing the game for Xbox 360, PC, Mac, Linux and Sega Dreamcast. Later in the same month, WaterMelon elaborated their project further, additionally opening an opportunity to make the game available in Japanese, and to release the game on Android platforms, Ouya and Wii U. Early in the following December, the Kickstarter page successfully surpassed the project's minimum donation goal, and assured game's release on Wii U, which had the highest required stretch. On November 15, 2013, it was announced that the Xbox 360 version was currently delayed, and the game will come to both PlayStation 3 and PlayStation 4 in March 2014. WaterMelon announced their studio's acceptance into Microsoft's Xbox One developer program on December 4, 2013, as well as their intention to publish Pier Solar HD on the console. In February 2014 it was announced that Pier Solar HD had been delayed again and is now expected to be released in Q2 2014. On August 19 it was announced that Pier Solar HD is in certification and will be released as a cross-buy title for PS4 and PS3 on September 30 and as of October 2 PS Vita.

The Dreamcast version was the last one to be released on November 27, 2015, the reason for the delay was that unlike the digital releases, the DC version had it to be completely bug tested as it couldn't be patched. The final game features battle speed and frequency options, newly drawn cutscene artworks, as well as a 3 minutes opening animation created by the game's character designer and cinematics director, Armen M.

== Reception ==
Reception

Aggregate score
Aggregator	Score					
Aggregator	PC	PS3	PS4	Sega Genesis	Wii U	Xbox One
Metacritic	73/100	N/A	69/100	N/A	62/100	N/A

Review scores
Publication	Score					
Publication	PC	PS3	PS4	Sega Genesis	Wii U	Xbox One
1Up.com	N/A	N/A	N/A	B	N/A	N/A
Game Informer	N/A	N/A	7/10	N/A	N/A	N/A
Hardcore Gamer	N/A	N/A	4/5	N/A	4/5	N/A
Jeuxvideo.com	13/20	13/20	13/20	18/20	N/A	N/A
Nintendo Life	N/A	N/A	N/A	N/A	6/10	N/A
Nintendo World Report	N/A	N/A	N/A	N/A	5.5/10	N/A
Push Square	N/A	N/A	6/10	N/A	N/A	N/A
Retro Gamer	N/A	N/A	N/A	84%	N/A	N/A
RPGamer	2.5/5	N/A	N/A	N/A	N/A	N/A
RPGFan	N/A	N/A	70/100	69/100	N/A	N/A
GamesTribune	N/A	N/A	N/A	N/A	7/10	N/A
Nintendojo	N/A	N/A	N/A	N/A	B	N/A
Pure Xbox	N/A	N/A	N/A	N/A	N/A	6/10

Pier Solar and the Great Architects was met with mixed reviews from critics. While its presentation was widely praised, reception to the gameplay was average. Hardcore Gamer's Bradly Halestorm praised the game's use of a "vibrant color palette" and its "strong art direction", calling the game "one hell of a roleplaying experience". RPGFan's Derek Heemsbergen said that the game's graphics, music and atmosphere were "fantastic", but felt that the actual gameplay was too frustrating, noting what he perceived as a "labyrinthine" design in many areas. He also described parts of the game's combat as "tedious and repetitive", citing "lengthy" animations and "high difficulty" as reasons. RPGamer's Mike Moehnke concluded that the game was "unlikely to appeal to many people weaned on more recent generations of RPGs", adding that "those with a more retro mindset will find some enjoyment".

The game's soundtrack received widespread acclaim. Heemsbergen called it "catchy" and noted that it helped "[augment] the game's atmosphere". Game Informer's Joe Juba said that the soundtrack helped in achieving an "authentic 16-bit" look, calling it "absolutely fantastic". Halestorm called it "a triumph" and added that it managed to "convey strong emotions" with "beautifully arranged" compositions.

In 2011, 1UP.com identified Pier Solar and the Great Architects as one of the "31 homebrew games worth playing."
