= Zodiac: Orcanon Odyssey =

2015 video game

- Developer: Kobojo
- Publisher: Kobojo
- Writer: Kazushige Nojima
- Composer: Hitoshi Sakimoto
- Engine: Unity
- Platform: iOS
- Release: November 10, 2015
- Genre: Role-playing
- Modes: Single-player, multiplayer

Zodiac: Orcanon Odyssey is a 2015 role-playing video game developed and published by Kobojo for iOS. Releases for the PlayStation Vita and PlayStation 4 were announced but never released.

== Gameplay ==
The game plays as a Japanese role-playing video game, specifically taking elements from Final Fantasy, Valkyrie Profile and Dragon's Crown. While the game does contain heavy online multiplayer elements, the game is entirely able to be played from beginning to ending, without use of any online elements, as well.

== Development ==
The game's conception began as part of the company's desire to change its focus out of the simple, casual Facebook games it had been making in the past.

The game was first announced in September 2014, at the Tokyo Game Show, for the iOS and PlayStation Vita platforms. At the time of announcement, the game had already been in development for a year. In June 2015, the game's subtitle was revealed to be Orcanon Odyssey, and an additional platform, PlayStation 4, was announced. The game launched onto iPhone and iPad in November 2015, though neither of the Vita or PS4 versions have ever been released.

== Reception ==
Reception

Aggregate score
| Aggregator | Score |
|---|---|
| Metacritic | iOS: 66/100 |

Review scores
| Publication | Score |
|---|---|
| Pocket Gamer | 7/10 |
| TouchArcade | 4/10 |
| Digitally Downloaded | 4/5 |

The game's announcement won one of IGN's "Best Surprise" award in its retrospective reveal of the Tokyo Game Show in 2014.

According to review aggregator Metacritic, the full release of Zodiac: Orcanon Odyssey received generally mixed or average reviews upon release.

== See also ==
- Astria Ascending
