= Fenix Rage =

2014 video game

- Developer: Green Lava Studios
- Publisher: Reverb Triple XP
- Engine: GameMaker
- Platforms: Windows; PlayStation 4; Xbox One
- Release: Windows; September 24, 2014; PlayStation 4, Xbox One; June 8, 2016
- Genre: Platform
- Mode: Single-player

Fenix Rage is a platform video game developed by the Costa Rican developer Green Lava Studios. The gameplay has been compared to a cross between Super Meat Boy and Flappy Bird. Its developers were inspired by Sonic the Hedgehog and the 90s cartoon SWAT Kats. The game was released on September 24, 2014, on Microsoft Windows. The title was rebranded as Fenix Furia for its release in 2016 for PlayStation 4 and Xbox One platforms, with the announced PlayStation Vita version being cancelled.

== Gameplay ==
The player-character, Fenix, pursues an evil creature after it freezes and destroys his town. Fenix can jump infinitely as well as dash. There are 200 levels, and the game has no tutorial. The player jumps around each level to reach a blue door. Each level has an optional cookie hidden in a difficult to access area. Players who collect them receive out-of-game recipes for new cookies. Players must restart the entire level upon dying, though respawns are fast.

== Development ==
Fenix Rage was made by Green Lava Studios, a three-person team from Costa Rica: CEO and programmer Eduardo Ramirez, Diego Vasquez, and Jose Mora. The gameplay is inspired by Sonic the Hedgehog and its art direction is influenced by 90s cartoon SWAT Kats and the Hellboy comics by Mike Mignola. Ramirez has said that they want players "to recapture the feeling of discovery". They debuted a "simple" prototype of the game on Google Play "a couple of years" before its late May 2014 announcement for the PlayStation 4. The game made its first public demo at PAX East 2014, where the team received positive feedback about the controls. Fenix Rage was released on September 24, 2014, for Windows. It was released for PlayStation 4 and Xbox One under the title Fenix Furia on June 8, 2016. The PlayStation Vita version was cancelled.

== Reception ==
Reception

Review score
Publication	Score
Hardcore Gamer	4/5

Video game journalists compared the game to a cross between Super Meat Boy and Flappy Bird. IGN wrote that dying often was what made the game fun. Hardcore Gamer said the game is "a worthy entry into an unfortunately short line of hardcore and enjoyable platformers, with great aesthetics and music backed by solid mechanics."
