= Kobojo =

French video game developer and distributor

- Industry: Video game developer and distributor
- Fate: Dormant
- Headquarters: Paris, France

Kobojo was a French video game developer and distribution company based in Paris. It was acquired by Celsius online in 2017. The company has since then stopped releasing new games, and has been most likely absorbed into the Celsius Online system.

== Games ==
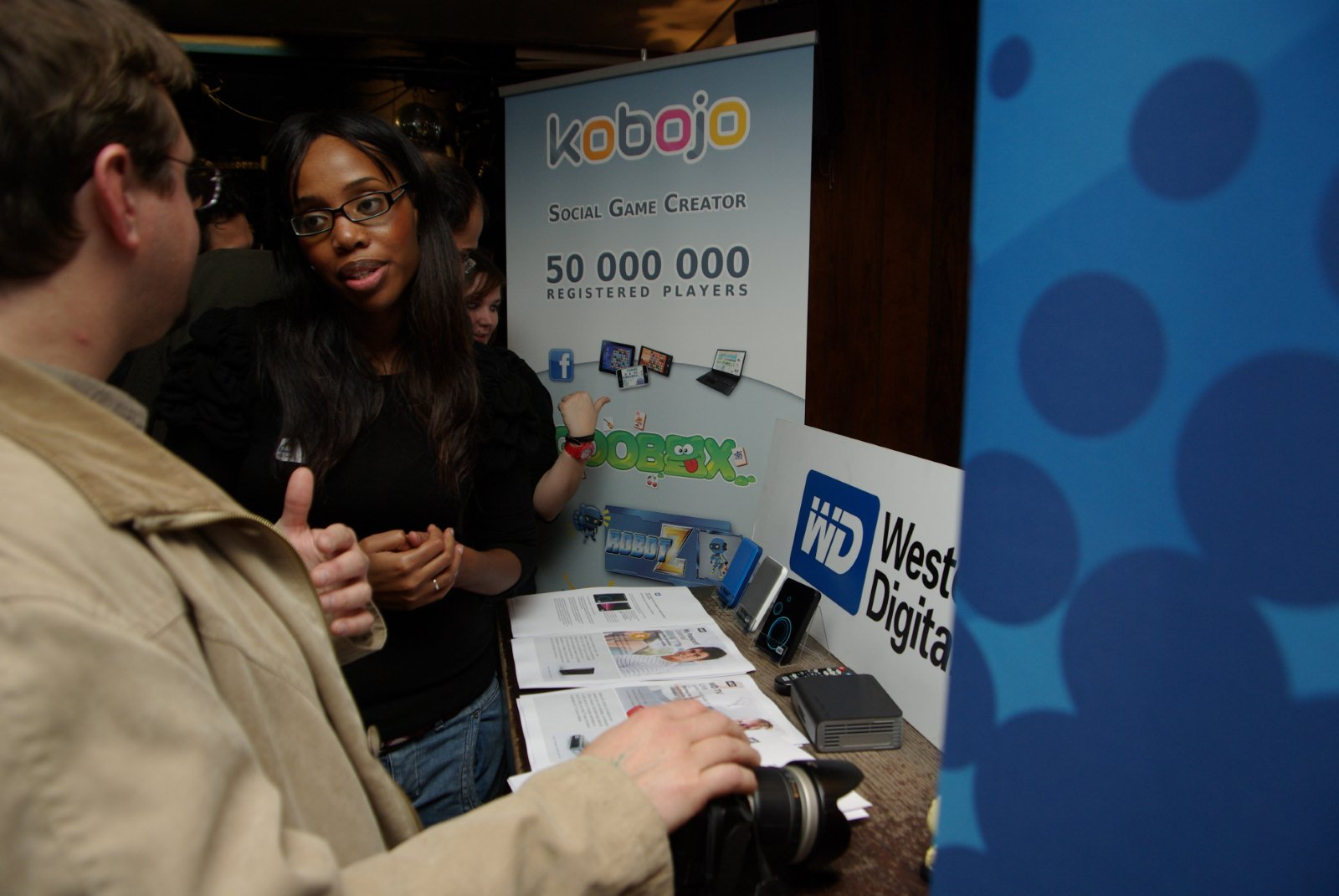
Kobojo booth in 2010.

- Mutants: Genetic Gladiators, released in April 2014
- Primal Legends, released in April 2016
- Zodiac: Orcanon Odyssey, released in November 2015

== Controversy ==
In May 2012, American video game developer Zynga sued Kobojo for trademark infringement for calling one of its games PyramidVille.. The lawsuit was eventually settled for an unknown amount.
