= Chronos Materia =

- Developer: Gust Co. Ltd.
- Publisher: Tecmo Koei
- Platform: PlayStation Vita
- Release: Cancelled
- Genre: Role-playing
- Mode: Single-player

Chronos Materia (Note: Japanese: クロノス・マテリア, Hepburn: Kuronosu Materia) is a cancelled role-playing video game by Gust Co. Ltd. The title was announced in 2013 as a PlayStation Vita exclusive title, but was quietly cancelled in April 2016. The game was intended to be a new IP by Gust, that would have mixed many of the aspects of their Atelier and Ar Nosurge series of games with elements of time travel.

== Gameplay ==
The game was to play as a role-playing video game with elements of time travel. In the game, the player could choose to go back in time and select different options to alter the way events would unfold, similar to the game flow of Radiant Historia. For example, a forest fire was to occur over the course of the game, and the player would have the opportunity to travel back in time and select different options to stop the forest fire from happening. Typical of RPGs, the game would involve battling monsters to gain experience points to make the player's characters stronger. When the player would choose to move backwards through time, the characters would retain the attributes that made them stronger, which was to be used strategically to gain an advantage. For example, if an enemy was too hard to defeat at any point in the game, the player could skip it and advance further while getting stronger. Once the player was more powerful, they could choose to go back in time and fight it which would allow for an easier battle.

== Story ==
The game's premise involved a group of young adventures being dropped into a mysterious world where no sign of civilization was present. The course of the story's game would involve the characters trying to figure out how to survive on their own in the foreign world, and find out how and why they appeared there in the first place, as nobody has any recollection of how they ended up there. The cast's ultimate goal is to return home. Five main characters of the party had been revealed: Iris, Time, Primla, Scion, and Licorice. Additionally, eight other "artificial intelligence" characters, referred to as homunculi, can be created to help the main characters in the game's tasks. The classes were "Witch", "Swordsman", "Summoner", "Star Hymnist", "Saint", "Battle Maiden", "Shrine Maiden", and "Sacred Tree", although their exact roles for how they assisted the player were not explicitly defined.

== Development ==
The game was first announced in a June 2013 issue of Dengeki PlayStation, with an initial release date of September 23, 2013. The development team, Gust's, main goal in creating the game was to make it an RPG that was easy for the player to get into and play repeatedly. Character designs were drawn by a vocaloid artist that goes by "Non". While the game was meant to be brand new IP for Gust, it still shared concepts often visited in its other games, such as item synthesizing and artificial life seen in their Atelier and Ar Nosurge titles.

In mid-2013, screenshots and information regarding the game were released, but it was delayed shortly before its release date without a new one. No further updates were given after the delay, in 2014 or 2015, although the game had not been announced as cancelled at the time, with its official website even remaining active through 2016. The game was announced as cancelled in April 2016 in an issue of Famitsu with no reason given. Tecmo Koei had not announced plans on whether or not they would have localized the game for English language regions. IGN speculated that it could go either way; smaller publishers such as NIS America had found success in translating some rather niche titles for the Vita, such as Danganronpa, but on the other hand, Tecmo Koei had opted out of translating the Vita version of One Piece: Pirate Warriors 2 around the time of Chronos Materia announcement.
